= Toronto radial lines =

Defunct railyway lines in Ontario, Canada

The Toronto radial lines were interurban lines radiating from Toronto, Ontario, Canada. All are now defunct.

- Toronto and York Radial Railway acquired the following companies converting each into an operating division:
  - Metropolitan Street Railway (T&YRR Metropolitan Division)
    - Schomberg and Aurora Railway (acquired by the Metropolitan Street Railway; became T&YRR Schomberg Branch)
    - North Yonge Railways (a remnant of the T&YRR Metropolitan Division operated by the Toronto Transportation Commission from 1930 to 1948)
  - Toronto and Scarboro' Electric Railway, Light and Power Company (T&YRR Scarboro Division)
  - Toronto and Mimico Electric Railway and Light Company (T&YRR Mimico Division)
- Toronto Suburban Railway, of which a small section of track became part of Halton County Radial Railway, a working museum
- Toronto Eastern Railway, built as far as Bowmanville but never operated commercially

Gray Coach, a publicly owned interurban bus service founded in 1927, went on to provide service along many of the routes previously served by the radial railways.

== See also ==
- Hydro Electric Railways, Toronto and York Division
