= Toronto and York Radial Railway =

Electric interurban railway in Toronto, Canada

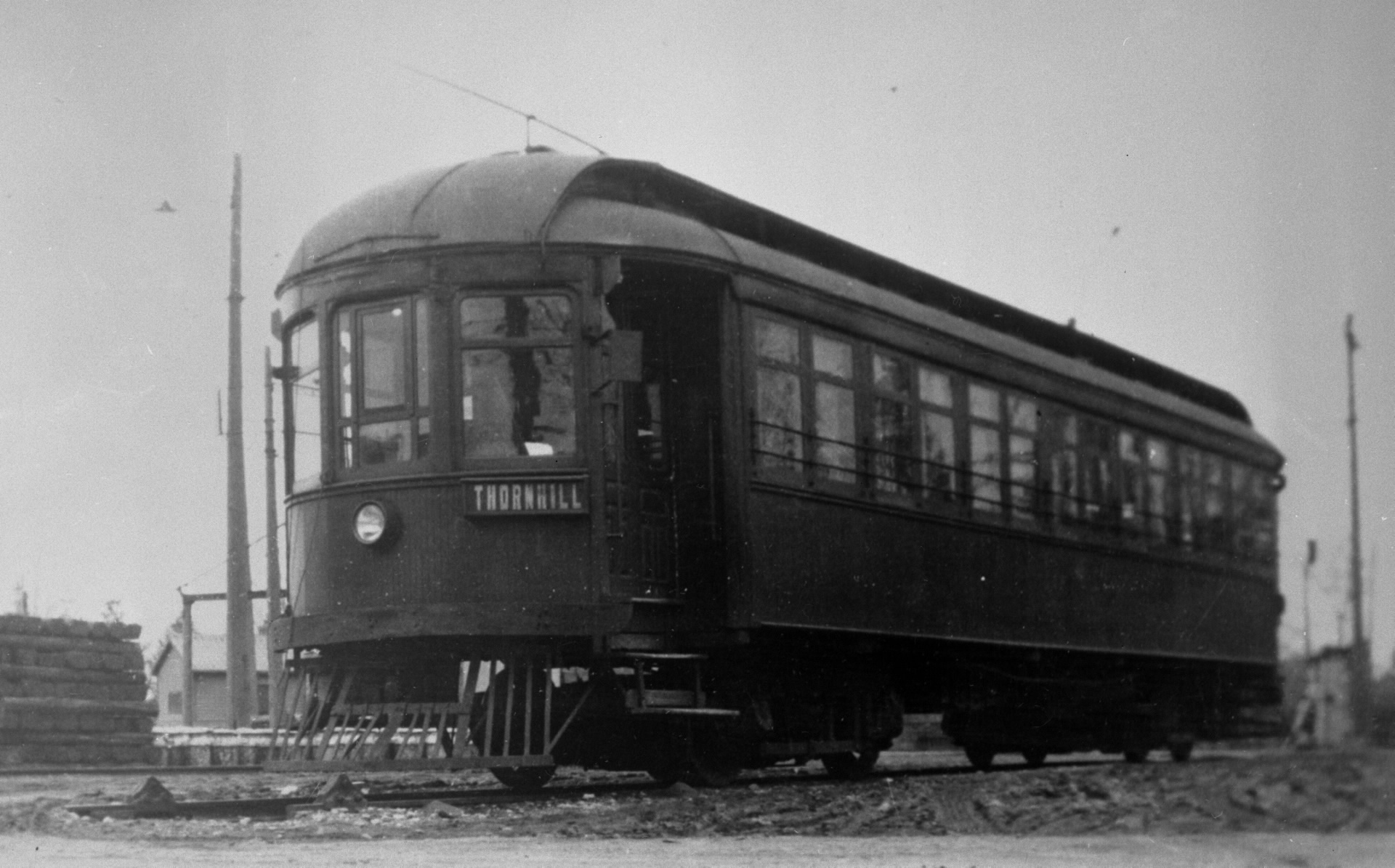
- Radial car on the Metropolitan line, circa 1921

Overview
- Headquarters: Toronto
- Locale: Toronto
- Dates of operation: 1904–1921 (T&YRR); 1922–1927 (HER); 1927–1948 (TTC)

Technical
- Track gauge: 4 ft 10 7/8 in (1,495 mm); 4 ft 8 1/2 in (1,435 mm) standard gauge
- Electrification: Trolley wire, 550-600 V DC

The Toronto and York Radial Railway was a transit operator providing services to the suburbs of Toronto, Ontario, Canada. It was a subsidiary of the Toronto Railway Company. The company was created by merging four Toronto-area interurban operations. The company was part of the empire of railway entrepreneurs Sir William Mackenzie and Donald Mann which included the Canadian Northern Railway and the parent Toronto Railway Company. The line was abandoned by the TTC in 1948.

== Lines ==
The table lists the 4 lines composing the T&YRR. Each line became a separate division of the T&YRR except for the Schomberg and Aurora which was a branch of the Metropolitan Division. Click on the predecessor company name for further details about each line. In 1904, the four predecessor companies were merged to form the Toronto and York Radial Railway.

Line	Predecessor company that created the line	Maximum extent of line under T&YRR	Line Opened	Line Closed
Metropolitan (Lake Simcoe)	Metropolitan Street Railway	CPR midtown line – Sutton	1885	1930
Schomberg and Aurora	Schomberg and Aurora Railway	Schomberg Junction (Oak Ridges, south of Aurora) – Schomberg	1904	1927
Mimico	Toronto and Mimico Electric Railway and Light Company	Sunnyside – Port Credit	1892	1935
Scarboro (Scarborough)	Toronto and Scarboro' Electric Railway, Light and Power Company	Kingston Road & Queen Street – West Hill	1893	1936

== Timeline ==
Timetable effective November 1919 for Toronto divisions of the T&YRR service

=== Pre-T&YRR era (1885–1904) ===
Events prior to the merger creating the T&YRR in 1904

In 1885, the Metropolitan Street Railway Company of Toronto (incorporated March 2, 1877, renamed Metropolitan Railway Company in 1897) started a horsecar line on Yonge Street.

In September 1890, electric service began on the Metropolitan line.

On July 16, 1892, the Toronto and Mimico Electric Railway and Light Company (incorporated November 14, 1890) began initial service between Sunnyside (Toronto) and the Humber River.

On July 1, 1893, the Toronto and Scarboro' Electric Railway, Light and Power Company (incorporated August 18, 1892) started electric, radial operations.

On July 5, 1893, the Toronto Railway Company acquired controlling interest in the Toronto and Mimico Electric Railway and Light Company.

On July 10, 1893, the Toronto and Mimico Electric Railway and Light Company extended service from Humber River to Mimico Creek, and further to Etobicoke Creek (Long Branch) on September 29, 1893.

On March 6, 1895, the Toronto Railway Company acquired controlling interest in the Toronto and Scarboro' Electric Railway, Light and Power Company.

By 1899, the Metropolitan line was extended to Aurora and Newmarket.

In 1903, Toronto and Mimico Electric Railway and Light Company changed its name to the Toronto and Mimico Railway Company.

=== Mackenzie & Mann era (1904–1921) ===
Events when the T&YRR was under the control of William Mackenzie and Donald Mann

On August 1, 1904, the T&YRR merged four rail operations, converting them into three T&YRR divisions, with the Metropolitan Division having a branch line:

- Metropolitan Street Railway to become the T&YRR Metropolitan Division
- Schomberg and Aurora Railway to become the Schomberg and Aurora Branch of the Metropolitan Division
- Toronto and Scarboro' Electric Railway, Light and Power Company to become the T&YRR Scarboro Division
- Toronto and Mimico Electric Railway and Light Company to become the T&YRR Mimico Division

In 1904, regular passenger service started on the Schomberg and Aurora Branch of the T&YRR's Metropolitan Division. At this time, the line operated with steam trains.

On December 24, 1905, the Mimico line was extended from Long Branch to Port Credit.

On June 1, 1907, the T&YRR opened a 40 km (25 mi) extension of the Metropolitan line from Newmarket to Jackson's Point.

On January 1, 1909, the T&YRR opened a 2.4 km (1.5 mi) extension of the Metropolitan line from Jackson's Point to Sutton.

On June 25, 1915, a City of Toronto work team ripped up the tracks of the Metropolitan Line along Yonge Street from the CPR crosstown line north to Farnham Avenue. This was a result of a dispute between the city led by Mayor Tommy Church and the T&YRR. Mayor Church complained about the "inadequate services provided by the Mackenzie-Mann traction companies" which included the Toronto Railway Company as well as the T&YRR. This was the first contraction of the T&YRR, albeit only 400 metres (1,300 ft) long.

In 1916, electrification of the Schomberg and Aurora Branch was completed.

In 1921, a plebiscite approved the purchase by the City of Toronto of the Toronto Railway Company and the T&YRR. The Toronto Transportation Commission was to operate all radial lines within the city limits.

On September 1, 1921, the TTC took over operation of all streetcar operations in the city, and shortly after took control those portions of the Scarboro and Mimico radial within the city limits.

By fall, 1921, the TTC took over the portion of the Metropolitan line on Yonge Street south of Glen Echo Road (at the city limit).

=== Hydro Electric era (1922–1927) ===
Events when the T&YRR was managed by Hydro-Electric Railways

In August, 1922, the City of Toronto formally acquired the T&YRR lines.

On November 1, 1922, operation of the T&YRR was taken over by Hydro Electric Power Commission of Ontario and run as the Hydro-Electric Railways: Toronto and York Division. Hydro made improvements to both the Metropolitan and Mimico lines.

At the end of 1923, the T&YRR under Hydro management had a deficit. The City blamed Hydro mismanagement. Hydro blamed the TTC's acquisition of the profitable portions of the radial lines within the city limits.

By 1925, Toronto City Council felt that integrating the radials within TTC operations would produce efficiency by avoiding duplication of carhouses and shops, by allowing the transfer of vehicles between radial and city lines to meet passenger demand, and by having firmer control over expenditures.

=== TTC era (1927–1948) ===
Events when the TTC operated the T&YRR lines

On January 12, 1927, the Toronto Transportation Commission started operating the T&YRR lines under contract with operations being the responsibility of the TTC's new Radial Department. Along with 3 radial lines, the TTC acquired 54 double-ended radial cars. The TTC now operated the second largest electric railway in North America with 585 kilometres (364 mi) of lines.

In June 1927, the Schomberg line was closed.

On March 16, 1930, the TTC closed the Metropolitan line.

On July 17, 1930, the TTC reopened a portion of the defunct Lake Shore line between Richmond Hill and Toronto as the North Yonge Railways. This line was owned by area municipalities and operated under contract by the TTC.

On February 9, 1935, the Long Branch-Port Credit radial service ended.

On June 25, 1936, the Scarborough radial service ended.

On October 9, 1948, service was terminated on the North Yonge Railways, the last surviving Toronto radial.

== Track gauge ==
Both Toronto gauge and standard gauge were used. The T&Y radial lines did not use a common gauge until the TTC took over the operation of the surviving lines in 1927 in order to connect the radial lines to the Toronto streetcar system.

The Metropolitan radial line started off with Toronto gauge in 1885, but switched to standard gauge after the Metropolitan Street Railway Company received provincial permission in 1895 to use any gauge it pleased. Standard gauge allowed the Metropolitan to exchange freight cars with steam railways. When the TTC took over the line in 1927, it converted the line to Toronto gauge but built a short section of four-rail, dual-gauge track in Aurora to deliver freight cars to a factory there.

The Mimico radial line used Toronto gauge until 1922 when the Hydro-Electric Railways converted the line to standard gauge. When the TTC took over the line in 1927, it converted the line back to Toronto gauge.

The Scarboro radial line used only Toronto gauge throughout its years of operations.

The Schomberg and Aurora line used only standard gauge throughout its years of operations.

== Electrical system ==
The system initially used 550 volts DC and later 600v DC, allowing the system to run into Toronto (the Toronto network runs at 600v DC).

== Comments ==
Unlike the city systems, the radial (interurban) operators used larger rail cars.

Radial routes ceased due to introduction of inter-urban buses and new highways that allowed for better access to many areas served by rail service.

Rail service returned to some of the communities served by the T&YRR by regional rail service of GO Transit in the 1970s.

== Other Toronto area lines controlled by Sir William Mackenzie ==
- Niagara, St. Catharines and Toronto Railway
- Toronto Suburban Railway
- Toronto Railway Company

== See also ==
- List of Ontario railways
- List of defunct Canadian railways

Preceded by None	Public Transit in Toronto - interurban street car 1904-1927	Succeeded by Toronto Transportation Commission
