= Toronto and Mimico Electric Railway and Light Company =

Former operator of the Mimico radial line in Toronto

Mimico radial line (later Port Credit line)
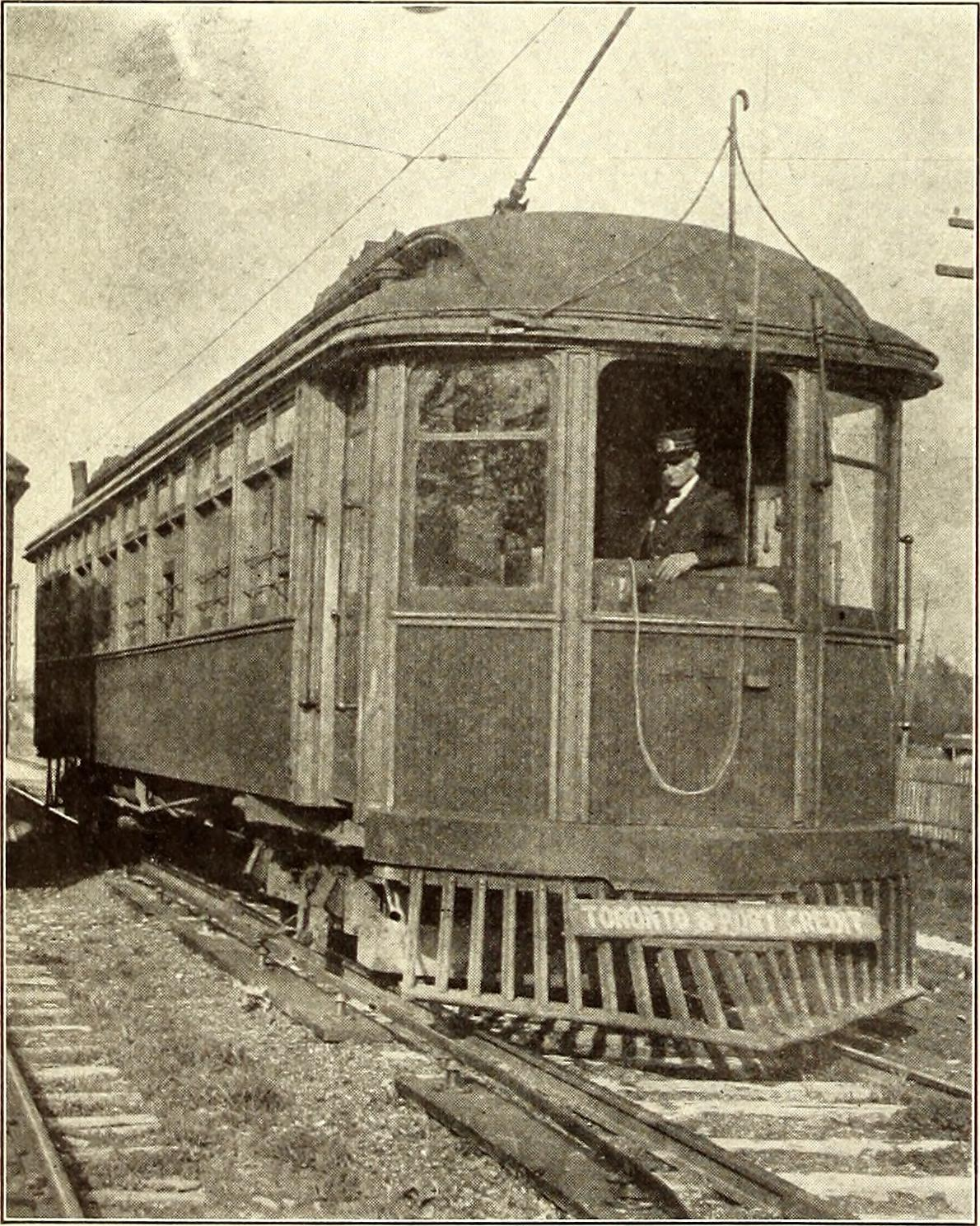
- Radial car, Mimico division of T&YRR

Overview
- Locale: Mimico (Toronto) - Port Credit (Mississauga)
- Dates of operation: 1892–1935

Technical
- Track gauge: 1892-1922: 4 ft 10 7/8 in (1,495 mm) 1922 to 1927: 4 ft 8 1/2 in (1,435 mm) standard gauge 1927-1935: 4 ft 10 7/8 in (1,495 mm) Toronto gauge
- Length: 8.37 mi (13.47 km) (1905-1927)

The Toronto and Mimico Electric Railway and Light Company was incorporated in 1890, and operated the Mimico radial line in the Toronto area. The line started operation in 1892 as a short suburban line that later was extended to Port Credit. In 1904, the railway was acquired by the Toronto and York Radial Railway (T&YRR) and became the T&YRR Mimico Division. In 1922, the City of Toronto acquired the T&YRR and contracted Ontario Hydro to manage the four T&YRR lines including the Mimico line. In 1927, the TTC took over the operation of the Mimico line and extended its service eastward to Roncesvalles Avenue. In 1928, the TTC double-tracked the line from Humber to Long Branch and made that portion part of the Lake Shore streetcar line. The portion beyond Long Branch to Port Credit became the Port Credit line, and continued operation as a single-track radial line until its closure on February 9, 1935.

== Timeline ==
=== Pre-T&YRR era (1890-1904) ===
Events prior to the merger creating the Toronto and York Radial Railway in 1904

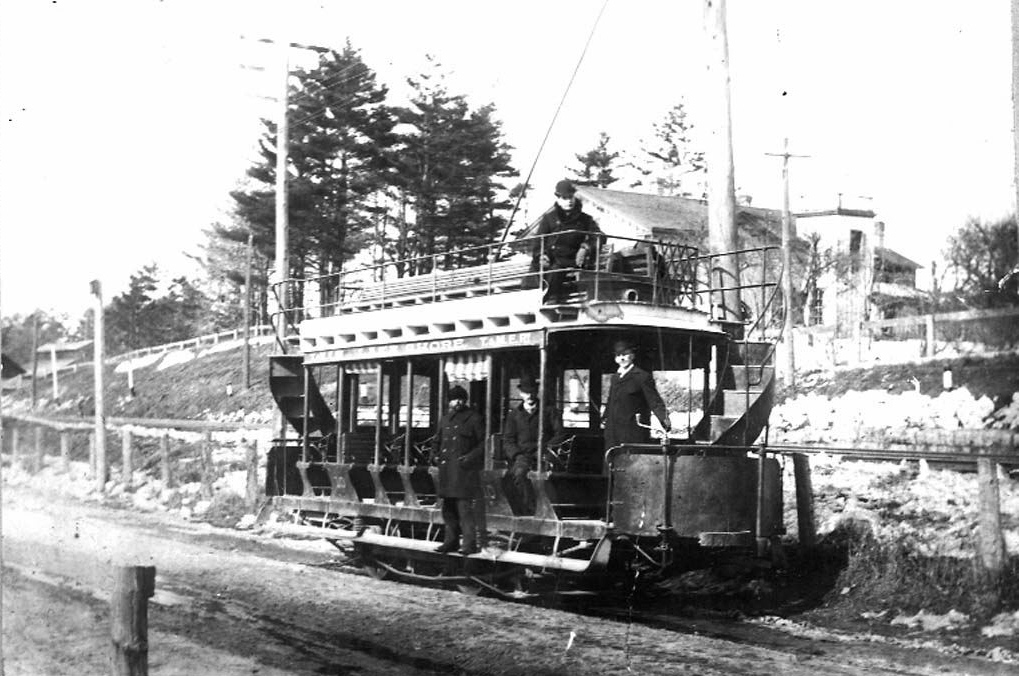
Single truck double deck car number 10 in winter 1893 (scrapped circa 1904)

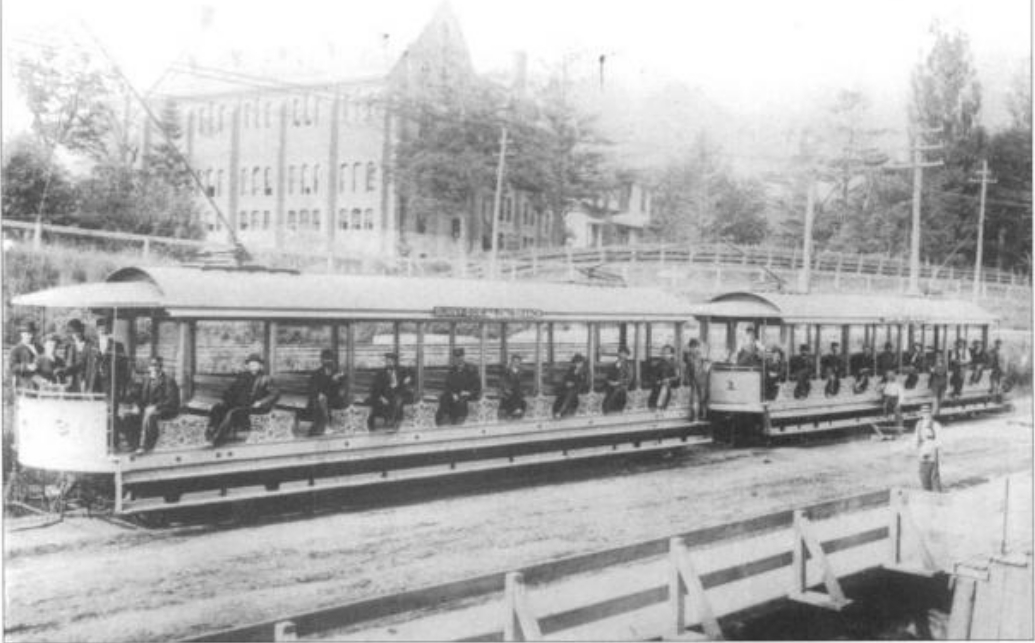
Double truck open cars #1 and #3 at Sunnyside in 1896.

On 16 July 16, 1892, the Toronto and Mimico Electric Railway and Light Company (incorporated November 14, 1890) began initial service between Sunnyside and the Humber River. The electrified line operated along a single track with only open cars, two of which were double-deck. The line used Toronto gauge

On July 5, 1893, the Toronto Railway Company acquired controlling interest in the Toronto and Mimico Electric Railway and Light Company, after the latter became insolvent due to a decline in ridership during winter as the line had no closed cars. The ridership on the line at that time was mainly from summer excursions. The TRC introduced two closed cars, both former horse cars that had been motorized, and these were the only closed cars until 1896.

On July 10, 1893, the Toronto and Mimico Electric Railway and Light Company extended service from Humber River to Mimico Creek, and further to Etobicoke Creek (Long Branch) on September 29, 1893. The line ran on the north side of Lakeshore Road (now Lake Shore Boulevard) with passing sidings at Park Lawn Road, Allen Avenue and Royal York Road. The line could now give summer service to Long Branch Park, which evolved into an amusement park in the 1890s.

On June 20, 1896, two open, double-deck cars (numbers 1 and 3) built went into service. Both cars were built by the TRC, and could each carry up to 96 passengers. In addition, the line already had two smaller double-deck cars (numbers 10 and 11) from a different manufacturer. The TRC also provided open motor car 301, converted from an open trailer.

On June 13, 1897, the line started Sunday service, helping to increase summer excursion traffic. Growth in towns and villages along the route also increased ridership.

For the fiscal year ending June 1902, the railway showed a profit.

In 1903, Toronto and Mimico Electric Railway and Light Company changed its name to the Toronto and Mimico Railway Company.

=== Mackenzie & Mann era (1904-1921) ===
Events when the Toronto and York Radial Railway was under the control of William Mackenzie and Donald Mann

On August 1, 1904, the Toronto and Mimico Railway Company was merged into the Toronto and York Radial Railway becoming its Mimico Division, thus ending the Toronto Railway Company's involvement in suburban services.

On December 24, 1905, the Mimico line was extended from Long Branch to Port Credit at Hurontario Street, and a year later to Stavebank Road, about 175 metres (574 ft) east of the Credit River. West of the Etobicoke Creek, the line was on the south side of Lake Shore Road. A trip from Port Credit to Yonge Street would take 2 hours and cost 18 cents.

=== Hydro Electric era (1922-1927) ===
Events when the Toronto and York Radial Railway was managed by Hydro-Electric Railways

On August 16, 1922, the City of Toronto formally acquired the T&YRR lines. The plan was that the city portions of the T&YRR radial lines would be incorporated into the TTC, and the portions outside the city would be managed by Ontario Hydro as the Hydro-Electric Railways: Toronto and York Division.

On November 1, 1922, Hydro-Electric Railways took over operation of the T&YRR lines outside of the city limits. The TTC replaced the radial line between Sunnyside and the Humber River with a double-track streetcar line. After 1922, Hydro changed the gauge of the Mimico line between Humber (the line's new eastern terminal) and Port Credit from Toronto gauge to standard gauge. HER introduced new standard-gauge cars and doubled service frequency.

From 1923 to 1926, ridership on the Mimico line decreased steadily from 3,760,299 to 2,325,701. Competing railway service could deliver passengers from Port Credit direct to Union Station in almost half the time at half the fare as taking the radial and transferring to a city streetcar at Humber.

=== TTC era (1927-1935) ===
Events when the TTC operated the Toronto and York Radial Railway lines

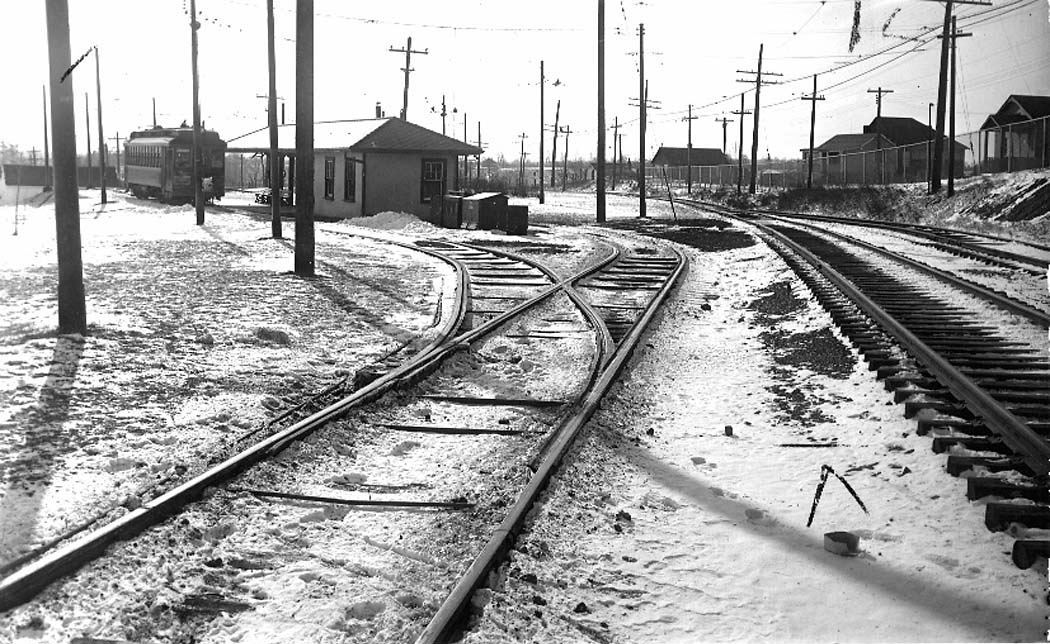
Long Branch Loop in 1935, showing the last radial car to go west to Port Credit

On January 12, 1927, the Toronto Transportation Commission started operating the T&YRR lines under contract. Shortly after, the TTC converted the Mimico line from standard gauge back to Toronto gauge.

On November 21, 1927, the TTC extended the Mimico route eastwards to Roncesvalles Avenue.

On May 9, 1928, the Beach streetcar route was extended west to Humber Loop evenings, Saturday afternoons and Sundays, overlapping Mimico radial service.

As of September 28, 1928, the TTC split the Mimico line into two portions. The portion between Humber Loop and Long Branch Loop was double-tracked and became part of the Lake Shore streetcar route coming from downtown. The portion between Long Branch and Port Credit became the Port Credit line, a single-track radial line using older radial cars. The Port Credit line operated every 30 minutes even overnight.

On February 9, 1935, the Long Branch-Port Credit radial service ended, being replaced by bus service.

=== Small Arms Extension (1942-1945) ===
On October 28, 1942, during World War II, a temporary double-track streetcar extension went into service from Long Branch Loop west to an armaments factory. Roughly following the route of the defunct Port Credit radial line, the "Small Arms Extension" ran for 0.33 mi (0.53 km) on the north side of Lakeshore Road over the Etobicoke Creek and terminated at a loop by the factory near the foot of Dixie Road. Peter Witt streetcars served the extension. Service ceased by October 14, 1945, and the extension was removed thereafter.

== Stations ==
- Mimico
- Long Branch
- Port Credit

== Carhouses ==
- Carhouse built by the T&YRR near Grenadier Pond (1890s?-1927)
- Roncesvalles Carhouse (1927-1935)

== Fleet ==
This is a partial description of the fleet:

Fleet description
Make/Model	Description	Car numbers	Fleet size	Year acquired	Year retired	Notes
Ottawa Car Company R Class	radial cars	409–416	8	1924–1925	1928	Transferred to Wychwood Carhouse in 1928 then to North Yonge Railways in 1930

== See also ==
- List of Ontario railways
- List of defunct Canadian railways
