= Teddington (disambiguation) =

Teddington is a town in west London.

Teddington may also refer to:

== Places ==
- Teddington, Gloucestershire – a village in Gloucestershire, England
- Teddington, New Zealand – a small community at the head of Lyttelton Harbour, New Zealand
- Teddington, Queensland – a locality in Queensland Australia
- Teddington Park – a neighbourhood in Toronto, Ontario, Canada

== Others ==
- Teddington Studios, a British television studio in Teddington, London
- Teddington (horse), a racehorse in the late 19th century
