= Metropolitan line (Toronto) =

Former Toronto railway electric radial line

Metropolitan radial line (later Lake Simcoe line)
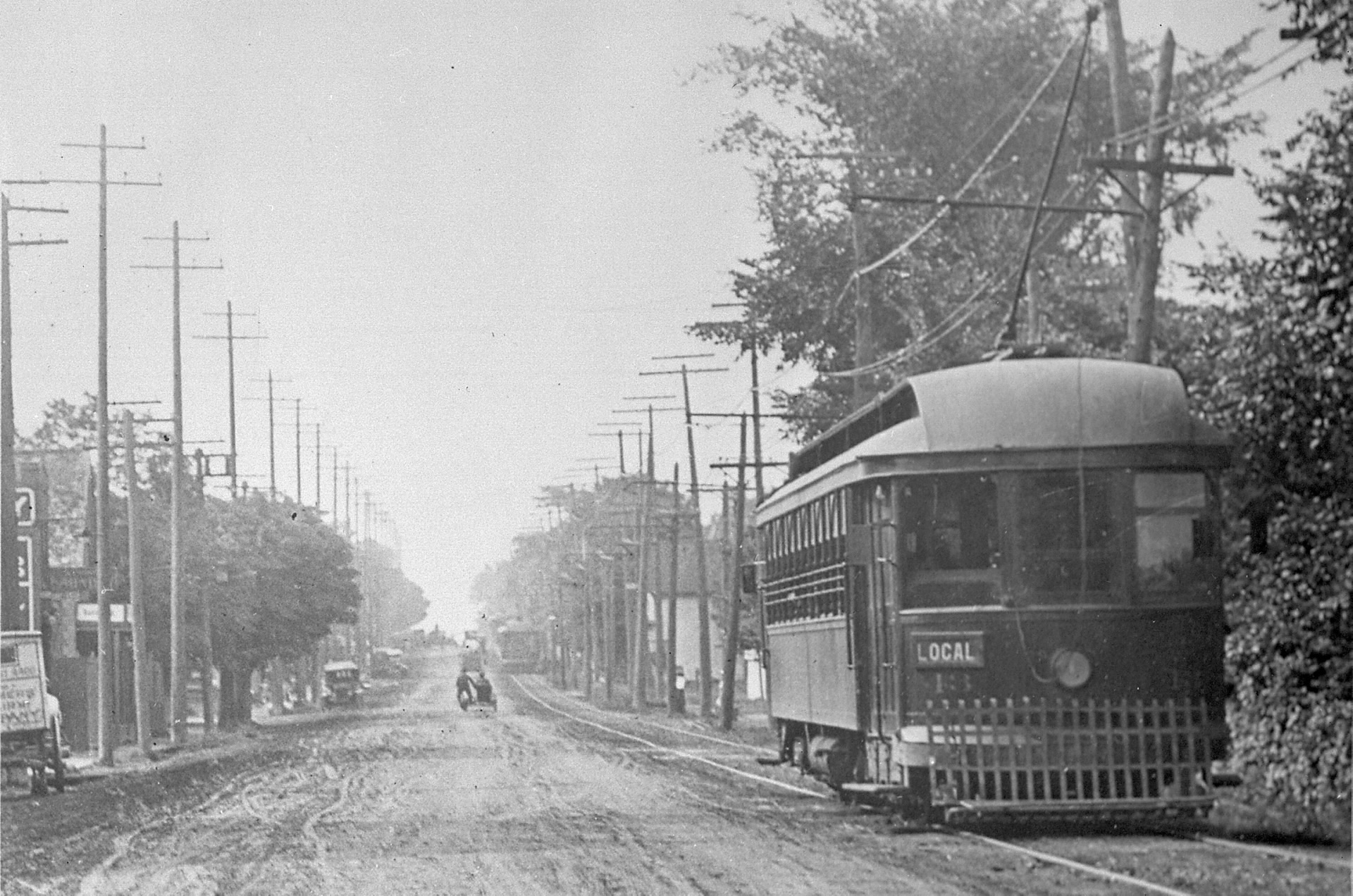
- Metropolitan line on Yonge Street at Sherwood Avenue looking south (1912)

Overview
- Headquarters: Toronto
- Locale: Toronto
- Dates of operation: 1885–1930
- Successor: North Yonge Railways

Technical
- Track gauge: 1885–1895?: 1,495 mm (4 ft 10 7/8 in) Toronto gauge; 1895?–1927: 1,435 mm (4 ft 8 1/2 in) standard gauge; 1927–1930: 1,495 mm (4 ft 10 7/8 in) Toronto gauge
- Length: 77 km (48 mi)

The Metropolitan line in the Toronto area, operated by the Metropolitan Street Railway, started out as a local horsecar line and transformed itself into an electric radial line extending to Lake Simcoe, following an old stage coach route. In 1904, the railway was acquired by the Toronto and York Radial Railway (T&YRR) and became the T&YRR Metropolitan Division. In 1922, the City of Toronto acquired the T&YRR and contracted Ontario Hydro to manage the four T&YRR lines including the Metropolitan. In 1927, the TTC took over the operation of the Metropolitan Line to Sutton, and renamed it the Lake Simcoe line. In 1930, the TTC closed the Metropolitan Line but shortly reopened the portion between Glen Echo and Richmond Hill operating it as the North Yonge Railways until 1948.

== Description of the line ==
The Metropolitan line was a single-track radial line with passing loops. Between 1909 and 1914, the Metropolitan line was at its maximum length, running from the CPR crossing at Yonge Street to Sutton. Here is a description of the line during that period:

The Toronto terminal of the Metropolitan line was situated on Yonge Street, north of the CPR crossing (then a level crossing) near today's Summerhill subway station. Passengers arriving by the Yonge streetcar line needed to alight on the south side of the CPR crossing and then walk northwards across the CPR tracks in order to board the radial cars of the Metropolitan Line. A 1905 photo shows that the terminal was situated off-street at the southwest corner of Yonge Street and Birch Avenue (today this is an electrical substation). However, a 1914 map shows that the terminal was relocated to the east side of Yonge Street (today the LCBO north parking lot).

From this Toronto terminal, the line ran northwards along the west side of Yonge Street until the northern crest of Hogg's Hollow. Along the way, the line passed the line's carhouse on the southwest side of St. Clair Avenue West, and the company's electrical generation station at Davisville. Reaching the southern brim of Hogg's Hollow, the line descended an 8% grade. In 1922, the southern terminal was relocated from Summerville to Glen Echo at this southern brim.

From the northern brim of Hogg's Hollow, the line crossed from the west side of Yonge Street to run along the street's east side for another 19 mi (31 km), except for its Richmond Hill and Aurora sections using the centre of the street.

In Richmond Hill, the radial station was located on the northeast corner of Yonge Street and Lorne Avenue (about 10131 Yonge) where passengers boarded radial cars in the street before the station. Next, at the southwest edge of Bond Lake on the east side of Yonge Street (today's Oak Ridges Trail), there were a carhouse and a power station. On the north side of Bond Lake was Bond Lake Park, which still exists today, and which created a major source of excursion traffic demand for the line. Continuing northward, between Bond Lake and Aurora there was a junction with the Schomberg and Aurora Railway steam railway, electrified in 1916.

At Mulock's Corners, the line left Yonge Street to continue cross-country to Newmarket. The Newmarket radial station was on Botsford Street across from the Old Town Hall (460 Botsford St), with the track running along the town hall's west side in a short alley (later expanded into Market Square and Raglan Street). In 1904, the line had run down the centre of Main Street Newmarket, but was relocated to the alley in 1905.

About Queen Street in Newmarket, the line continued north cross-country through Sharon, Keswick and Jackson's Point. In the section between Keswick and Jackson's Point, it ran parallel to Metro Road and the shores of Lake Simcoe, often within view of the lake. From Jackson's Point, it travelled briefly southward to its terminus at Sutton Station.

The average operating speed was 32 km/h (20 mph). For comparison, the average speed of the subway Line 2 Bloor–Danforth is also 32 km/h (20 mph).

== Timeline ==
=== Pre–T&YRR era (1885–1904) ===
Events prior to the merger creating the Toronto and York Radial Railway in 1904 include:

In 1877, the franchise was granted to the Metropolitan Street Railway of Toronto. The president was Robert Jaffray.

In 1880, brothers Charles and W.A. Warren bought a controlling interest in the Metropolitan Street Railway.

On January 26, 1885, the railway started a horsecar line on Yonge Street between the crosstown CPR rail line (near today's Summerhill Station) north to Eglinton Avenue. The line was single track laid to Toronto gauge, and used double-ended cars to avoid turning loops. At the CPR line passengers could transfer to the horsecars of the Toronto Street Railway.

In September 1890, electric service began on the Metropolitan Street Railway. However, horse-drawn buses were temporarily substituted circa October 1890 to May 1891. The faster, heavier electrical trams had damaged the tracks forcing a rebuild of the line.

In 1892, the Metropolitan line reached York Mills South (today's Glen Echo Road and location of the future Glen Echo loop).

In 1893, the company's name was changed from the Metropolitan Street Railway of Toronto to the Metropolitan Street Railway Company (MStRyCo).

In 1895, the province granted the railway the right to build lines in York and Simcoe counties, to use any gauge and motive power of its choice, and to make agreements with other railways (steam or electric) for connections, running rights and the interchange of cars. The railway would choose standard gauge.

On February 1, 1897, the Metropolitan line was opened to Richmond Hill ending at a station located on Yonge Street at Lorne Avenue. Each one-way trip between the Toronto terminal (at the CPR crosstown line) to Richmond Hill took 45 minutes (versus 3 hours for the stagecoach), and there were 4 round trips per day. (In 2016, Triplinx, a regional trip planner, shows that the same trip from Summerhill subway station to Lorne Avenue in Richmond Hill using the subway and Viva would take a little over an hour.)

In 1897, the company's name changed again from the Metropolitan Street Railway Company to the Metropolitan Railway Company. With the extension to Richmond Hill, the line was now more a radial line than a street railway.

By 1899, the Metropolitan line was extended to Aurora and Newmarket. Approaching Newmarket, the line left Yonge Street at Mullock's Corners, crossed fields along the route of the present Cane Parkway and William Street, crossed Eagle Street and proceeded north on Main Street to its terminal at Timothy Street. The King George Hotel at the southeast corner of Timothy and Main streets in Newmarket served as a passenger depot for the radial line. Newmarket exempted the railway from property taxes for 10 years and allowed the railway company to supply electricity to the town. To support this extension, the company built a steam powerhouse at Bond Lake with a capacity of almost 1,000 horsepower. A trip between Toronto and Newmarket took 90 minutes.

In 1899, the railway acquired 200 acres of lakeshore land to create Bond Lake Park and generate passenger traffic for the Metropolitan line. During the 1901 season, there were 60,000 park visitors.

In 1902, the Metropolitan Railway Company acquired the then unfinished Schomberg and Aurora Railway.

=== Mackenzie & Mann era (1904–1921) ===
Events when the Toronto and York Radial Railway was under the control of William Mackenzie and Donald Mann include:

On August 1, 1904, the Metropolitan Street Railway and the Schomberg and Aurora Railway were merged into the Toronto and York Radial Railway both becoming part of its Metropolitan Division.

In 1905, the T&YRR relocated tracks in Newmarket from Main Street to a route running via sidestreets and lanes to a new station on Botsford Street opposite the town hall. The new station was equipped with freight sheds and later stationmaster's quarters on the second floor. The relocation of the tracks was to relieve traffic congestion on Main Street, as the street was not wide enough to conveniently accommodate both horse-drawn wagons and rail vehicles.

On June 1, 1907, the T&YRR opened a 40 km (25 mi) extension of the Metropolitan line from Newmarket to Jackson's Point.

On January 1, 1909, the T&YRR opened a 2.4 km (1.5 mi) extension of the Metropolitan line from Jackson's Point to Sutton. The Metropolitan line was now at its maximum extent. The Grand Trunk Railway (formerly Midland Railway, previously Toronto and Nipissing Railway) already served Sutton and Jackson's Point. After the arrival of the T&YRR in Sutton, the GTR reduced its passenger service there as passengers found the T&YRR service to be faster.

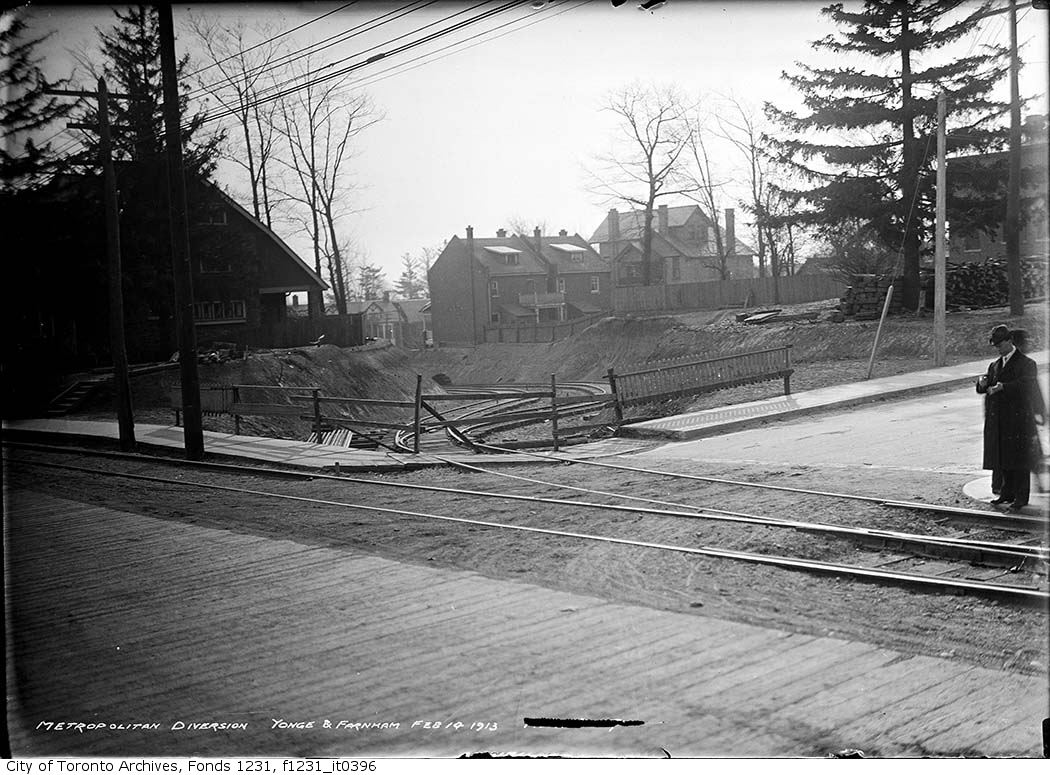
Metropolitan diversion, Yonge & Farnham Avenue, 1913.

In 1912-1913, the T&YRR partially constructed a diversion line 100 feet (30 m) west of Yonge Street from Farnham Avenue to the CPR crosstown line in the Town of North Toronto, and then abandoned the project. The T&YRR had laid double-track from Farnham Avenue and Yonge Street south to Walker Avenue with a crossover north of Walker. Starting in 1911, there was a dispute between the T&YRR and the town, which wanted a double-track line but objected to its being on a private right-of-way crossing multiple sidestreets at grade. The railway did not want to build a double-track line on Yonge Street, one reason being it would have to pay the town $600 per mile per track. In 1912, North Toronto voters relieved the railway of the requirement for double track. A legal decision at Osgoode Hall overrode the permission the Ontario Rail Board gave to the railway to build the diversion. However, after the Town of North Toronto was annexed by the City of Toronto in 1912, the dispute over double track continued between the railway and the city.

On June 25, 1915, a City of Toronto work team ripped up the tracks of the Metropolitan Line along Yonge Street from the CPR crosstown line north to Farnham Avenue. This was a result of a dispute between the city and the "Mackenzie-Mann traction companies" which included the Toronto Railway Company as well as the T&YRR. This was the first contraction of the T&YRR. Until 1916, passengers had to walk 400 metres (1,300 ft) to transfer between the radial and city cars on Yonge Street.

In 1916, electrification of the Schomberg and Aurora Branch was completed. Some S&A cars operated through to Toronto via the Metropolitan line, but most made connections at Bond Lake.

=== Hydro Electric era (1922–1927) ===
Events when the Toronto and York Radial Railway was managed by Hydro-Electric Railways include:

On August 16, 1922, the City of Toronto formally acquired the T&YRR lines. The plan was that the city portions of the T&YRR radial lines would be incorporated into the TTC, and the portions outside the city would be managed by Ontario Hydro as the Hydro-Electric Railways: Toronto and York Division.

On November 1, 1922, Hydro-Electric Railways took over operation of the T&YRR lines outside of the city limits. Hydro initiated a number of line improvements including track rehabilitation, a new station at Schomberg Junction, new waiting shelters, more passing sidings and additional service to Thornhill and Bond Lake Park.

On November 2, 1922, the TTC opened the Yonge streetcar line to the city limits at Glen Echo. The old standard-gauge, single-track Metropolitan line along the west side of Yonge Street from Farnham Avenue was replaced by a new double-track, centre-of-the-road streetcar line.

In March 1923, Glen Echo terminal was opened at the city limit at Yonge Street and Glen Echo Road. The terminal had a two-storey, buff-coloured building with Spanish roof tiles. The building had passenger and baggage facilities on the first floor and offices on the second. There was a nine-metre wide platform between the radial and streetcar tracks to facilitate transfers. The site was also home to the Glen Echo Carhouse.

Between 1922 and 1927, the Province and local municipalities built roads parallel to the line to Sutton as well as the branch to Schomberg. This allowed road traffic to cut into the revenue of the radial line.

=== TTC era (1927–1930) ===
Events when the TTC operated the Toronto and York Radial Railway lines include:

On January 12, 1927, the Toronto Transportation Commission started operating the T&YRR lines under contract. This included the Metropolitan line which the TTC renamed as the Lake Simcoe line.

In June 1927, the Schomberg and Aurora line was closed.

Between September 11 and 17, 1927, the TTC changed the Lake Simcoe line from standard gauge to Toronto gauge. The TTC also closed the Glen Echo shops and carhouse, and moved their function to the Eglinton Division carhouse. With the gauge conversion, it was possible to run radial cars into downtown Toronto, but except for night express cars and excursions to Bond Lake Park, the TTC took little advantage of this. The Glen Echo carhouse later became North York Township Market and then as Lawrence Motors Limited. The building was later demolished and now occupied by Loblaw's store.

In 1928, the TTC added a turning loop at Bond Lake Park, on the east side of Yonge Street just north of the park entrance. This allowed single-ended streetcars to supplement the double-ended radial cars in carrying crowds of visitors to the park.

On June 28, 1928, the TTC started a combined radial and bus service between Toronto and Beaverton, with a transfer between the radial cars and the bus at Sutton. A period ad suggested taking a Lake Simcoe radial car from the Toronto Glen Echo terminal at 1:40 pm, and transferring to the bus to Beaverton at 4:10 pm.

On July 12, 1928, the Orange Order held its annual picnic in Sutton and chartered all available radial cars plus a number of streetcars specially modified for radial service. The streetcars included four six-motor trains (pairs of ex–Toronto Railway Company streetcars operated in multiple-unit pairs), ex–Toronto Civic Railways double-ended car 2160 (class H-2) and three Peter Witt motors. From Glen Echo to Sutton, this was the longest trip by city streetcars along the radial line.

After the 1929 season, Bond Lake Park permanently closed.

On March 16, 1930, the TTC closed the Lake Simcoe (formerly Metropolitan) line after radial car 74 from Thornhill arrived in Toronto at 1:15 am. The line had been losing money for years, and road competition was the major factor as auto traffic increased: between 1925 and 1930, auto and truck traffic along Yonge Street more than doubled from 4,925 to 11,163 vehicles per day, and bus traffic increased from 2 trips to an astonishing 188 trips each day.

=== From 1930 ===
On July 17, 1930, the TTC reopened a portion of the defunct Lake Shore line between Richmond Hill and Toronto as the North Yonge Railways. This line was owned by area municipalities and operated under contract by the TTC.

On October 9, 1948, service was terminated on the North Yonge Railways, the last surviving Toronto radial.

The Toronto route section became a bus route and subway line up to Finch station, which opened int 1974, while the section from Finch Avenue to Newmarket became the responsibility of York Region Transit's Viva Blue route, supplemented by trains to Newmarket GO Station as the ex-urban population increased after 2007.

== Stops ==
Stops include:

Track map of Metropolitan Division, 1914

Metropolitan line stops south to north prior to 1922
- Toronto (CPR overpass)
- Eglinton - stops 14 & 15
- Glengrave Park - stop 21
- York Mills P.O. - stop 28
- Lansing P.O. - stop 31
- Willowdale P.O. - stop 33
- Finch's - stop 35
- Newtonbrook P.O. - stop 38
- Thornhill - stop 41
- Richmond Hill at Lorne Avenue - stop 49
- Hill's Bakery in Richmond Hill - stop 50
- Elgin Mills - stop 51
- Bond Lake Park - stop 56
- Schomberg Junction (Schomberg & Aurora Railway) - stop 57
- Aurora - stop 68
- Newmarket - stop 71
- Sharon - stop 74
- Queensville - stop 75
- Ravenshoe - stop 80
- Keswick - stop 83
- Orchard Beach - stop 85
- Roche's Point - stop 87
- Island Grove - stop 92
- Trivett's (waiting shelter) - stop 94
- Winch's (waiting shelter) - stop 95
- Sunnyside - stop 96
- Jackson's Point - stop 99
- Sutton - stop 100

== Facilities ==
=== South of Glen Echo before 1921 ===
- The Cemetery Hill carhouse (formal name unknown) was located on Cemetery Hill just south of the Belt Line Railway on the east side of Yonge Street, at the northwest corner of today's Mount Pleasant Cemetery. It was built after electrification of the Metropolitan line in 1890. This facility was replaced by the Deer Park Carhouse.
- The Deer Park Carhouse and shops were located on the west side of Yonge Street south of St. Clair Avenue (See 1914 map). It was opened by the T&YRR circa 1908, and was expanded in 1910.. The Toronto Transportation Commission acquired the carhouse in 1921 as the radial line's southern terminal was being moved north to the city limits at Glen Echo Road. At that time, the TTC was consolidating various streetcar operations which made the facility redundant. Thus, it was sold to the Badminton and Racquet Club of Toronto in 1924 and converted as badminton courts (the east sections of the carhouse remained). The building was gutted and mostly destroyed by a fire on February 14, 2017.
- Radial facilities south of Glen Echo Road were closed to radial operations circa 1921-1922.

=== 1922–1927 ===
Here is a list of Metropolitan line facilities from south to north in 1926:

- Glen Echo terminal
- Glen Echo Carhouse and Freight Shed
- York Mills - substation
- Bond Lake Park Carhouse and power house
- Newmarket Carhouse
- Sharon - freight station
- Sedore - substation
- Camps - freight houses

== Freight service ==
=== Standard gauge era (c. 1895–1927) ===
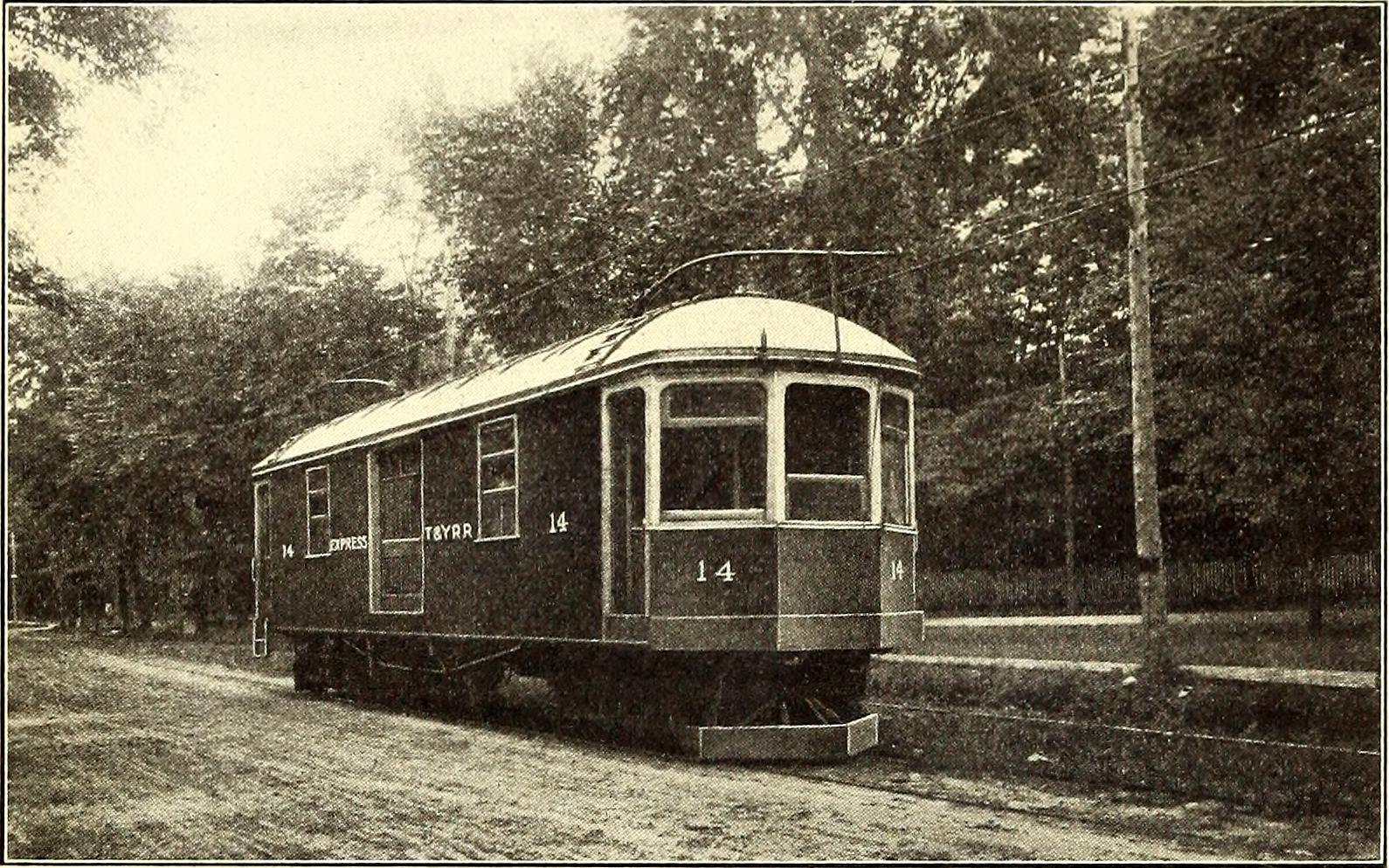
T&YRR express car on the Metropolitan line, 1908.

Once the Metropolitan line converted to standard gauge, it could interchange carload freight with steam railways, which it did with the CNR. Carload freight accounted for 10-15% of the line's revenue for many years. There was also milk traffic and train loads of ice from Lake Simcoe.

=== Toronto gauge era (1927–1930) ===
With the change of the Metropolitan line to Toronto gauge, express motors and trailers carrying less-than-car load freight and produce were run into downtown Toronto. The TTC converted the former motor shops of the Toronto Railway Company on Sherbourne Street into a freight terminal. There were 4 round trips per day from Sutton. Express service ended in 1930 with the closure of the Lake Simcoe line.

The TTC continued a standard-gauge freight service between the CNR and Collis Leather in Aurora. To do this, the TTC laid 3 km (1.9 mi) of four-rail, dual-gauge track. The TTC stationed a former passenger car there for standard-gauge shunting.

== Fleet ==
This section describe a few of the cars used on the line.

=== 1906–1907 purchase ===
The T&YRR purchased 15 new dark-green radial cars in 1906-1907 for the Metropolitan line.: According to a 1907 article in The Railway and Marine World, the cars had the following features:

- Seating for 24 passengers in the smoking section, 38 passengers in the main section.
- Equipped with lavatory, drinking-fountain, hat-racks, coat-hooks.
- Powered by four 75 h.p. motors giving each car 300 h.p.
- Maximum speed of 50 mi (80 km) per hour.
- Multiple-unit control by one motorman.
- Car length of 55 ft. 7 in., width of 9 ft. 3 in.

=== TTC radial cars ===
The TTC inherited several series of radial cars from the Hydro-Electric Railways in 1927. Here is a description of a few of those cars, all of which were double-ended.

Car numbers	Builder	Year built	Comments	Image
51,52	Southern Car Company	1906	Purchased in 1909 from the Norwich and Westerly Railway, Norwich, Connecticut.	
53,54,56,58,60	Toronto Railway Company	1906		
68,70,72,74,76,78	Toronto Railway Company	1907		

=== TTC streetcars ===
In early 1928, the TTC modified 7 double-ended ex-TCR cars 2160-2166, 23 single-ended Peter Witt cars 2500-2522 and 4 six-motor trains 1244/1170-1250/1176 for radial service. (A six-motor train was a coupled pair of 2 ex-TRC cars, the first car having 4 motors and the second having 2.) These cars were fitted with air whistles, large-flange wheels, and flag and marker light brackets. They were mainly used to handle heavy crowds to Bond Lake. However, on one occasion, such cars (including Peter Witt cars) went all the way to Sutton to accommodate an Orangemen's picnic, where the single-ended cars were reversed on a wye at Jackson's Point.

== Preservation status ==
Here is a list of preserved and surviving structures with stop numbering as of before 1922:

Location	Stop	Description	Photo
Aurora		Radial railway bridge abutment to support a bridge carrying the radial line over the Grand Trunk Railway tracks south of Aurora.	
Newmarket		Radial Arch: A concrete arch that supported part of a trestle to carry the radial line over Holland River and Grand Trunk Railway tracks in Newmarket.	
Queensville	75	Station moved to Queensville Sideroad as a private residence.	
Keswick	83	Station on Radial Road location now a legal office.	
Willow Beach		Power sub-station on Metro Road east of the 6th Concession now a private residence.	
Trivett's	94	Waiting shelter moved to Georgina Pioneer Village & Archives .	
Winch's	95	Waiting shelter moved to Georgina Pioneer Village & Archives.	
Sutton	100	Station located at Dalton and High Streets, now a real estate office. It is listed as a protected structure by the Town of Georgina, protected since 2009 under Part IV of the Ontario Heritage Act. The station was built in 1908.	

== Image gallery ==
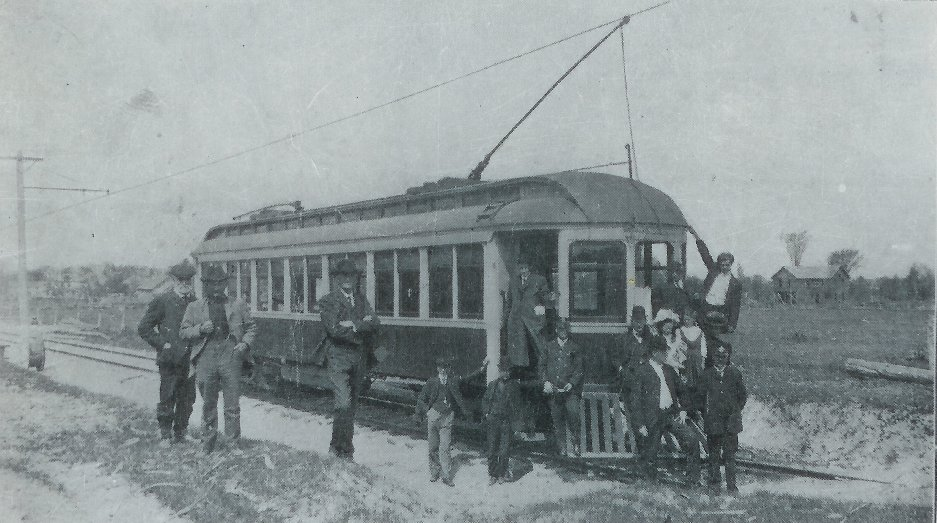
The first radial car to Jackson's Point, 1907

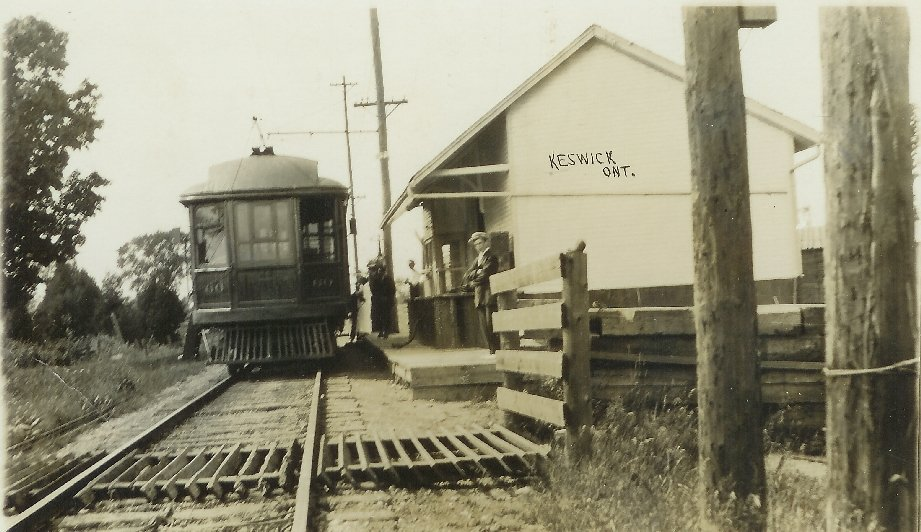
Keswick station, ca. 1910

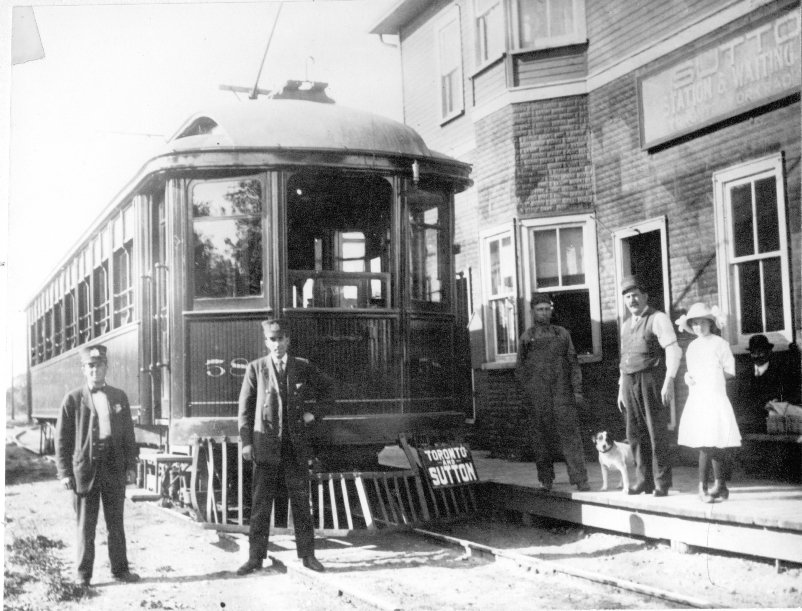
Sutton station, ca. 1920

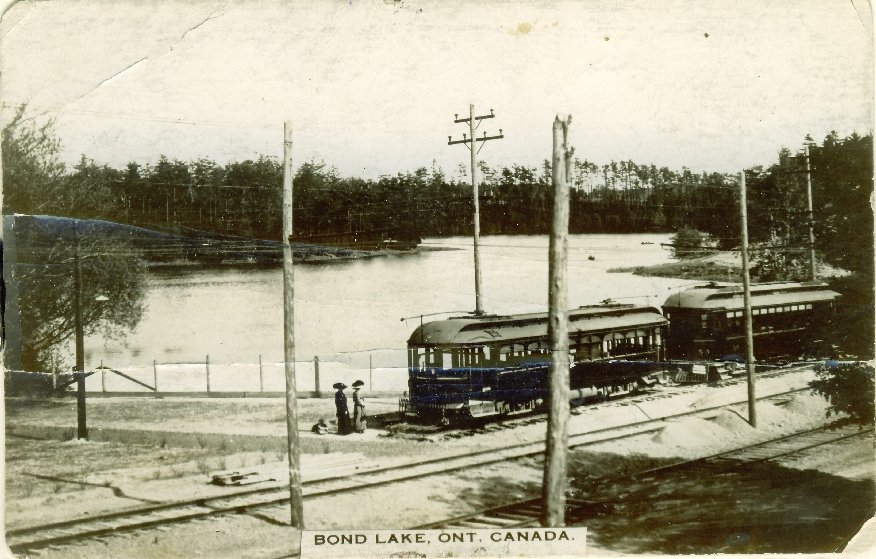
Radial car at Bond Lake, ca. 1910

== See also ==
- List of Ontario railways
- List of defunct Canadian railways
