= Glen Echo Historic District =

Glen Echo Historic District may refer to:

- Glen Echo Historic District (Normandy and Glen Echo Park, Missouri), listed on the National Register of Historic Places in St. Louis County, Missouri
- Glen Echo Historic District (Columbus, Ohio), listed on the National Register of Historic Places in Franklin County, Ohio

== See also ==
- Glen Echo (disambiguation)
