= Aurora Radial Railway Bridge Abutment =

Coordinates: 43.9821°N 79.4620°W

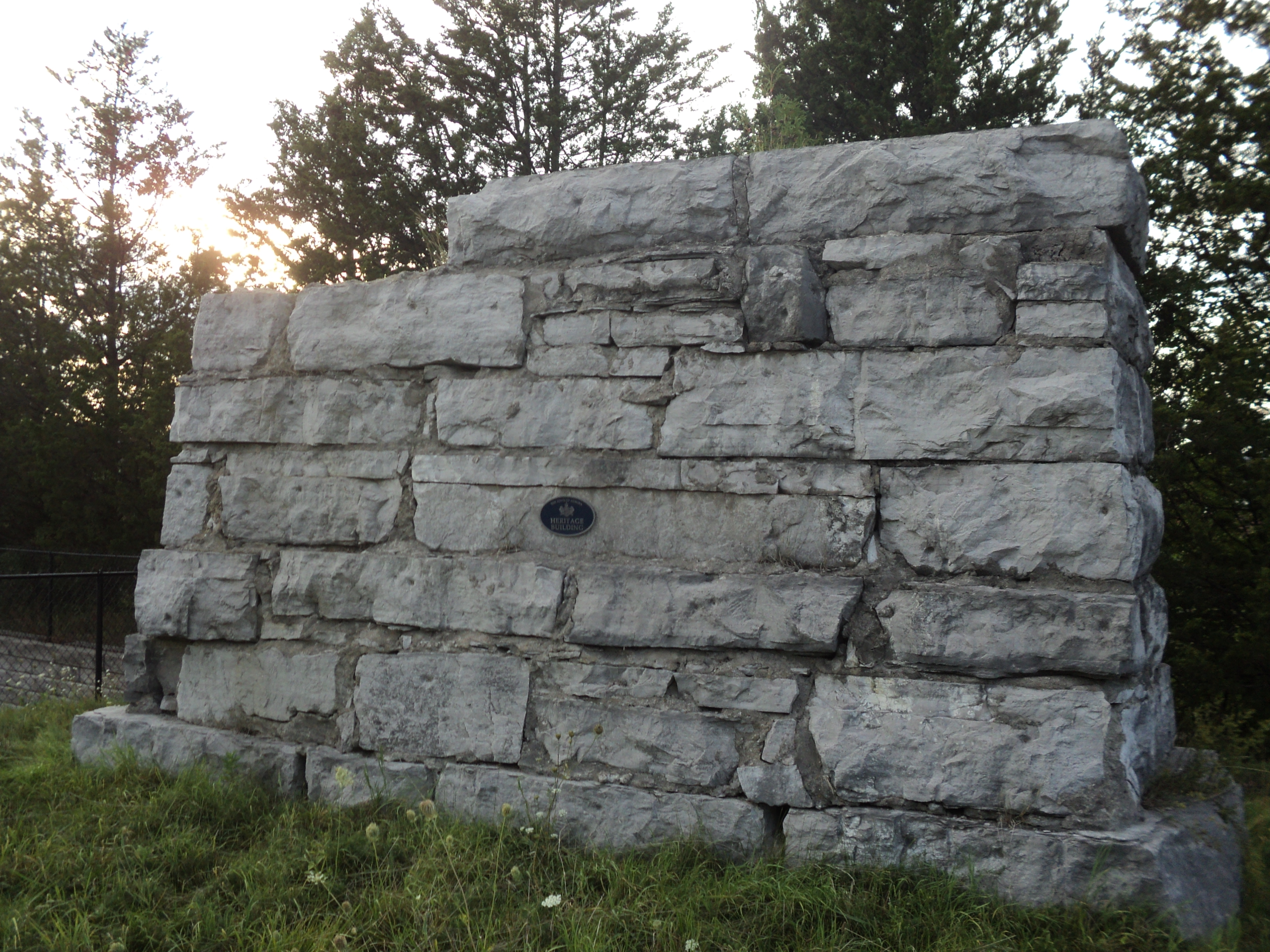
The abutment seen in 2014

The Aurora Radial Railway Bridge Abutment is all that remains of a bridge that was built across the Grand Trunk Railway line in 1899 as part of the Metropolitan Street Railway Company which built its radial line from Toronto along Yonge Street through Aurora, ending at Lake Simcoe. The bridge was removed in 1922 when radial tracks were relocated to share the Yonge Street underpass under the Grand Trunk Railway line. The radial line eventually closed in 1930 with the tracks removed the following year. The abutment is the last large remaining artefact of the radial railway in Aurora.

The abutment is described as a "sturdy, tapered, limestone pillar" with the "stone of the pillar is expertly laid and is typical of the construction methods of the era".

The abutment is a protected historical structure located in Aurora, Ontario. It is designated under Part IV of the Ontario Heritage Act. The structure was designated by the Town of Aurora in late 2006.
