= Temperanceville, Ontario =

Temperanceville
- Unincorporated community
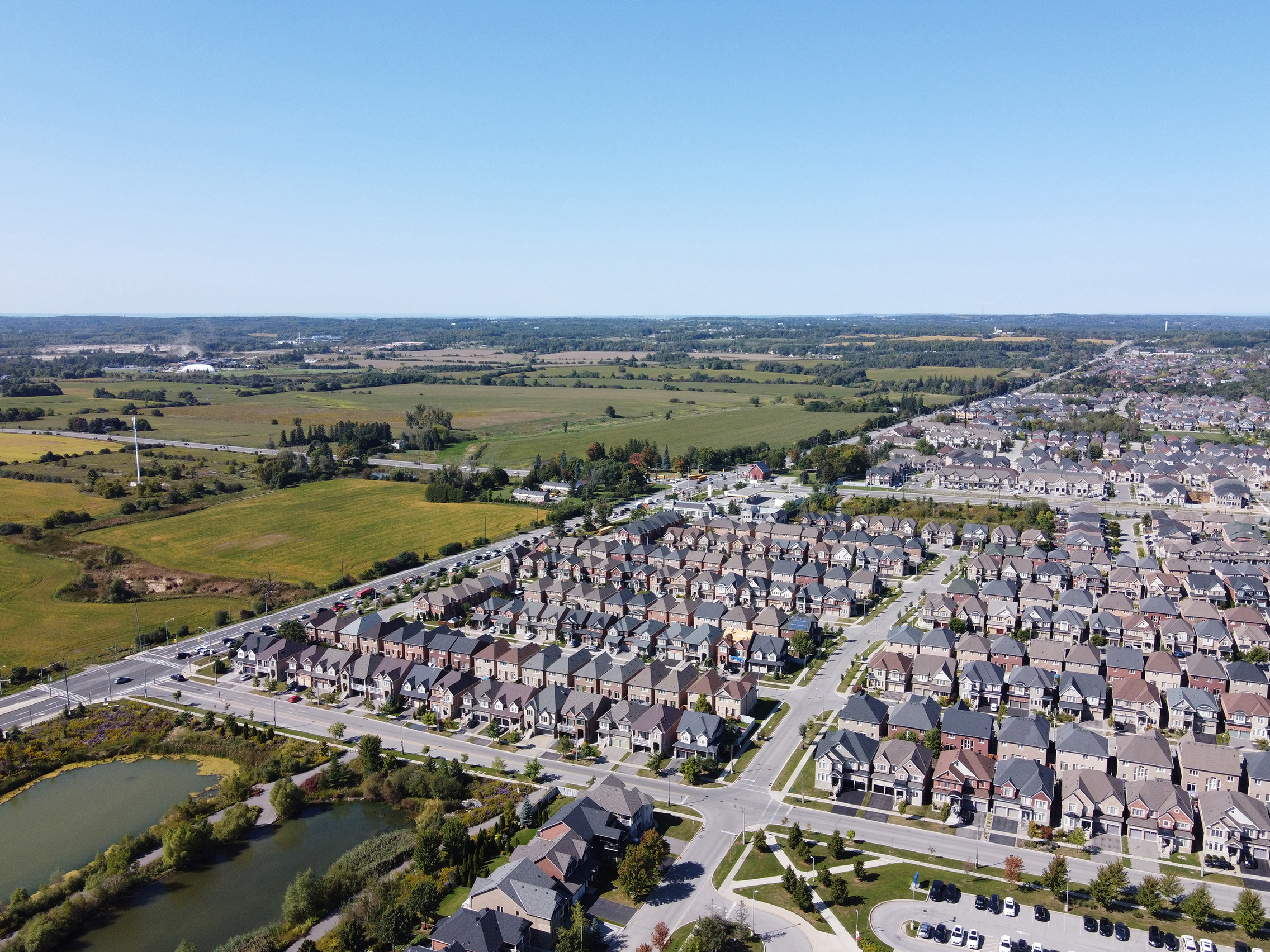
- Aerial view of Temperanceville, Ontario in 2023

- Location within Canada Location within Ontario Location within North America
- Coordinates: 43°56′20″N 79°28′53″W
- Country: Canada
- Province: Ontario
- Regional Municipality: York Region
- Town: Richmond Hill

Government
  - Mayor: Dave Barrow
  - Councillor: Greg Beros

Population (2006)
  - Total: <1,150
- Time zone: UTC−5 (EST)
  - Summer (DST): UTC−4 (EDT)
- Forward sortation area: L4E
- Area codes: 905 and 289
- NTS Map: 030M14
- GNBC Code: FCVJT

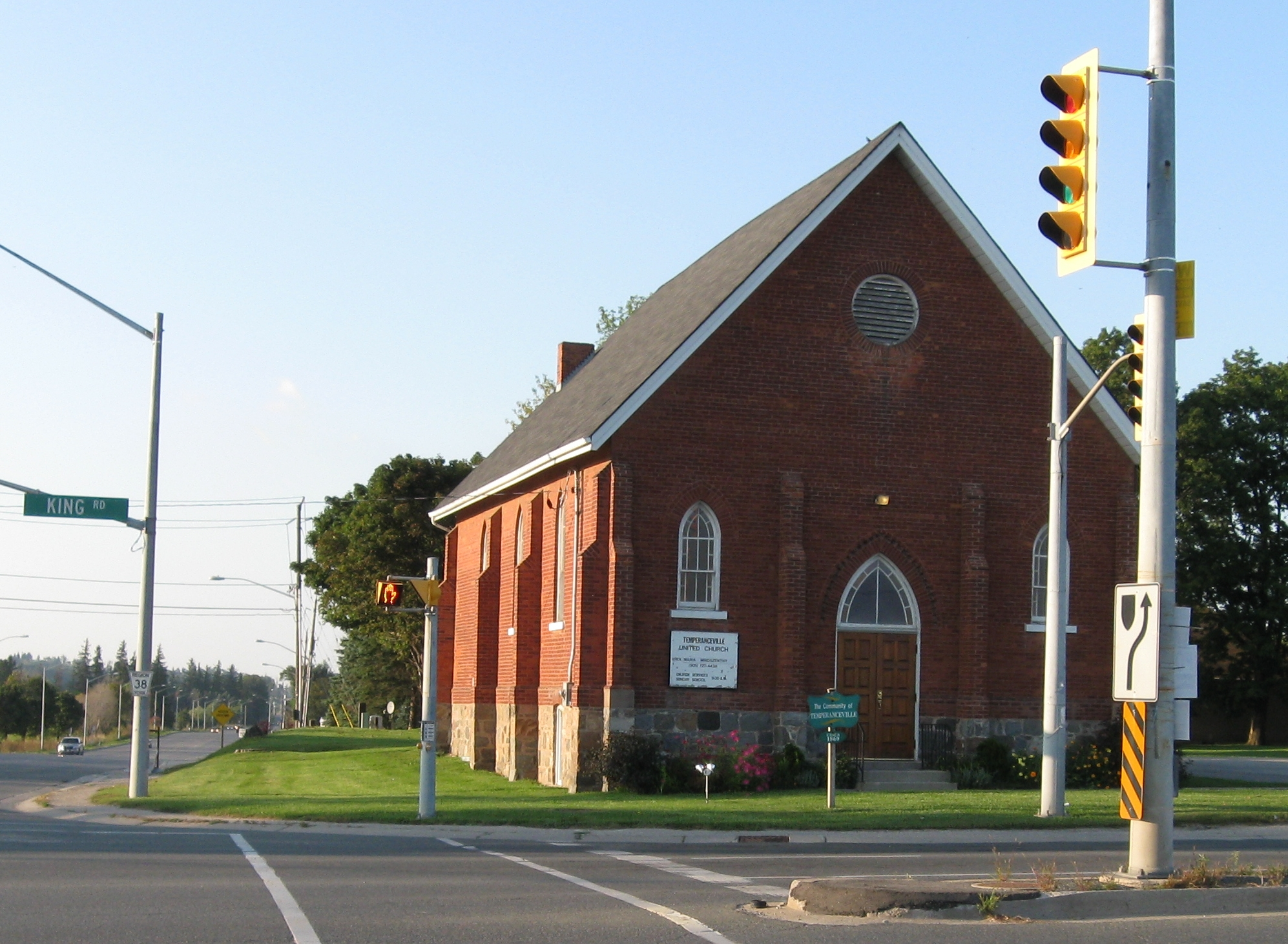
Temperanceville United Church

Temperanceville is an unincorporated community in the Regional Municipality of York in Ontario, Canada, straddling two geopolitical jurisdictions, King and Richmond Hill. It is located at the southeastern edge of King and northwestern part of Richmond Hill, east of King City and adjacent to the western part of Oak Ridges.

The settlement became home to James and Mary Love in 1804, the former being a cobbler and farmer who was also a teetotaler. Their home would be used for church services, leading to the settlement being named 'Love's Corner'. The settlement also had an active temperance movement, with at least five temperance societies active in the area by the 1890s. Its name was changed in the early 1900s when the prohibition campaign became popular through the promotion of 'temperance values'. This campaign would later help cripple the hotel industry in the area.

Temperanceville would grow to boast a post office, several businesses, and a market.

Today, the most popular part of Temperanceville is the Temperanceville Park, which now has ample parking, a soccer field, and a large children's play area.

In King Township, it is part of electoral Ward 1.

== Religion ==
A Presbyterian church was built in 1858, and the first service held in September 1859. Its last service was conducted in 1912, and the building converted into a residence. In 1971, facing demolition for roadwork, it was purchased by an individual who de-constructed it and used the material to construct a new building with similar features to the original.

The Methodist congregation was established in 1804 and hosted in Love's house. A log structure for the congregation was built in 1809, replaced by a red brick building in 1854. A red brick church was built at the corner on the northeast corner of King Road and Bathurst Street in 1897, later becoming affiliated with the United Church of Canada.

== Transit ==
There are two GO Transit bus stops in Temperanceville along the Newmarket-York University Line. The first is at the corner of Toscanini/Kingshill and King, while the second is at the corner of Bathurst and King. There are stops on both the northbound and southbound routes. Service to the area is provided via YRT bus lines 88, 22, and 22A.

== See also ==
- List of unincorporated communities in Ontario
