= Glen Echo =

Glen Echo may refer to:

== Australia ==
- Glen Echo, Queensland, a locality in the Gympie Region, Queensland, Australia

== Canada ==
- Glen Echo Park, Ontario, a former nudist park in Southern Ontario, Canada
- Glen Echo Road, a residential road located in the Teddington Park area of North York, Ontario
  - Glen Echo Terminal, Carhouse and Loop, a former terminus for the Metropolitan radial line, Toronto

== United States ==
- Glen Echo, Colorado
- Glen Echo (Ellabelle, Georgia), listed on the NRHP in Bryan County, Georgia
- Glen Echo, Maryland
  - Glen Echo Park (Maryland), former amusement park
- Glen Echo Park, Missouri
- Glen Echo, Columbus, Ohio, NRHP-listed
- Glen Echo (Franklin, Tennessee), listed on the NRHP in Williamson County, Tennessee
