= Schomberg and Aurora Railway =

Short line railway in Ontario, Canada

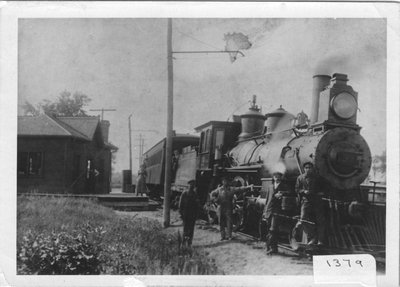
- Aurora Station at Oak Ridges

Overview
- Headquarters: Toronto
- Locale: Schomberg, Aurora
- Dates of operation: 1902–1927

Technical
- Track gauge: 4 ft 8 1/2 in (1,435 mm) standard gauge
- Length: 22.5 km (14.0 mi)

The Schomberg and Aurora Railway (S&AR, also nicknamed the "Annie Rooney") was a 36 km long railway in Ontario, Canada, running from the town of Schomberg to Oak Ridges, just south of Aurora. It connected Schomberg to the Metropolitan Line of the Toronto and York Radial Railway (T&YRR) tram service running along Yonge Street, and from there into the Toronto city proper. The service ran for 25 years between 1902 and 1927; the rails were pulled up shortly thereafter.

In 1902, the Schomberg and Aurora Railway was acquired by the Metropolitan Street Railway which in turn was acquired by the Toronto and York Radial Railway in 1904.

== History ==
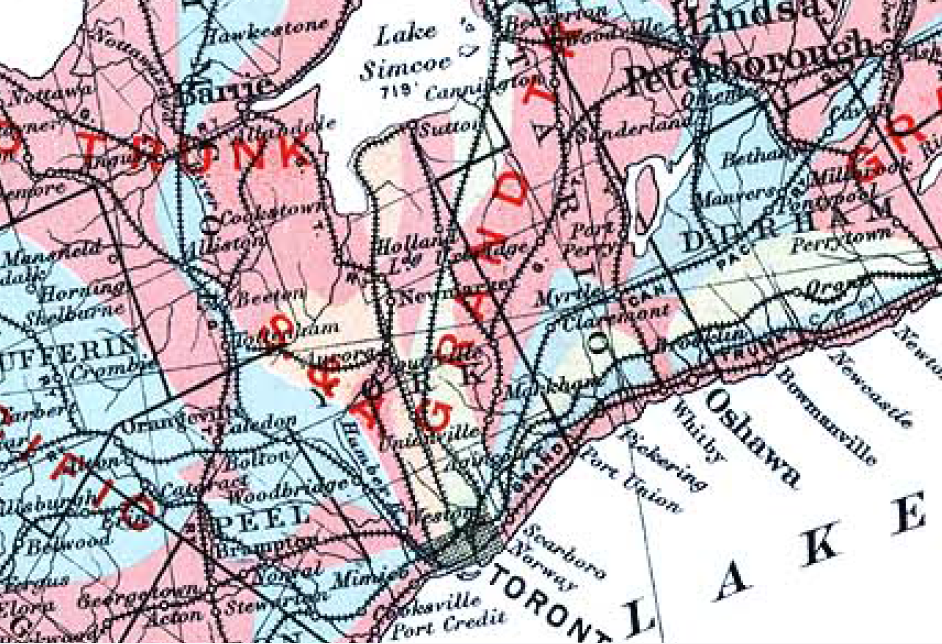
Map of the S&A circa 1915. See the small S&A and the pale yellow patch near the center of the image.

The S&AR started at the request of a Schomberg businessman who wanted to open the local produce markets to day-trippers from Toronto. The T&YRR had greatly increased visitors to similar markets in Newmarket and they were hoping to do the same for Schomberg. The company was chartered in 1896, and construction started out from the Bond Lake area south of Aurora in July 1899.

The line was completed and opened for traffic in August 1902, an oddity that used steam trains to connect to the much smaller electrified trams, a connection made at Aurora. There were four stations in total, Aurora on the west side of Yonge Street north of Bond Crescent, Eversley Station on Dufferin Street, Kettleby Station at the corner of Kettleby Road and Weston Road, and Schomberg Station in the middle of Main Street in Schomberg. (The S&A "Aurora" station was actually in Oak Ridges, a community within today's Town of Richmond Hill to the south of Aurora.) The S&A connected with the T&YRR's Metropolitan line at Aurora. There were also numerous street-side whistle stops along the route, numbers 158 through 171. Because the railway operated on a small budget, it purchased extant buildings for its stations instead of constructing new ones.

There were four spurs, one to Mary Lake to serve a private line to the summer estates of Henry Pellatt and the Eatons (Eaton Hall), two smaller ones near Pottageville serving the Lloyd and Armstrong farms, and a small wye at Brillinger farm.

Initially, the S&A used two old steam locomotives and one or two passenger cars. It ran two round trips daily, three on Wednesday market days.

The S&AR operated independently for only two years before it was absorbed into the T&YRR family, part of William Mackenzie's railway empire. In 1916 the line was electrified and connected to the Metropolitan line at Yonge Street, allowing full interchange of cars. Some S&A cars operated through to Toronto via the Metropolitan line, but most made connections at Bond Lake. In addition to passenger traffic, the line generated about 300 carloads of freight per year.

The line was never very busy, and the T&YRR scaled back operations. Between 1923 and 1926, expenses to run the line were about $26,000 per year, but revenues for that period declined from $31,325 to $17,997. The S&AR was closed on June 20, 1927. Attempts by residents in Schomberg to reopen the line failed, and the rails were removed the next year.

== Remains of the line ==
Portions of the former right-of-way remain easily visible on aerial photos today, notably the portions closer to Schomberg. The final few hundred yards were incorporated into Dr. Kay Road in Schomberg, running between Main Street and the much newer Highway 27 to the east. Other portions have been incorporated in the nearby 19th Sideroad, a private driveway and Brule Trail, but development to the east of Highway 400 makes it more difficult to follow.

The Aurora station was converted into a restaurant before being demolished in the 1960s. The only S&AR building still in existence is a house in Schomberg that was once the terminus of the line.

== See also ==
- List of Ontario railways
- List of defunct Canadian railways
