= Oak Ridges, Ontario =

Oak Ridges
- Unincorporated community
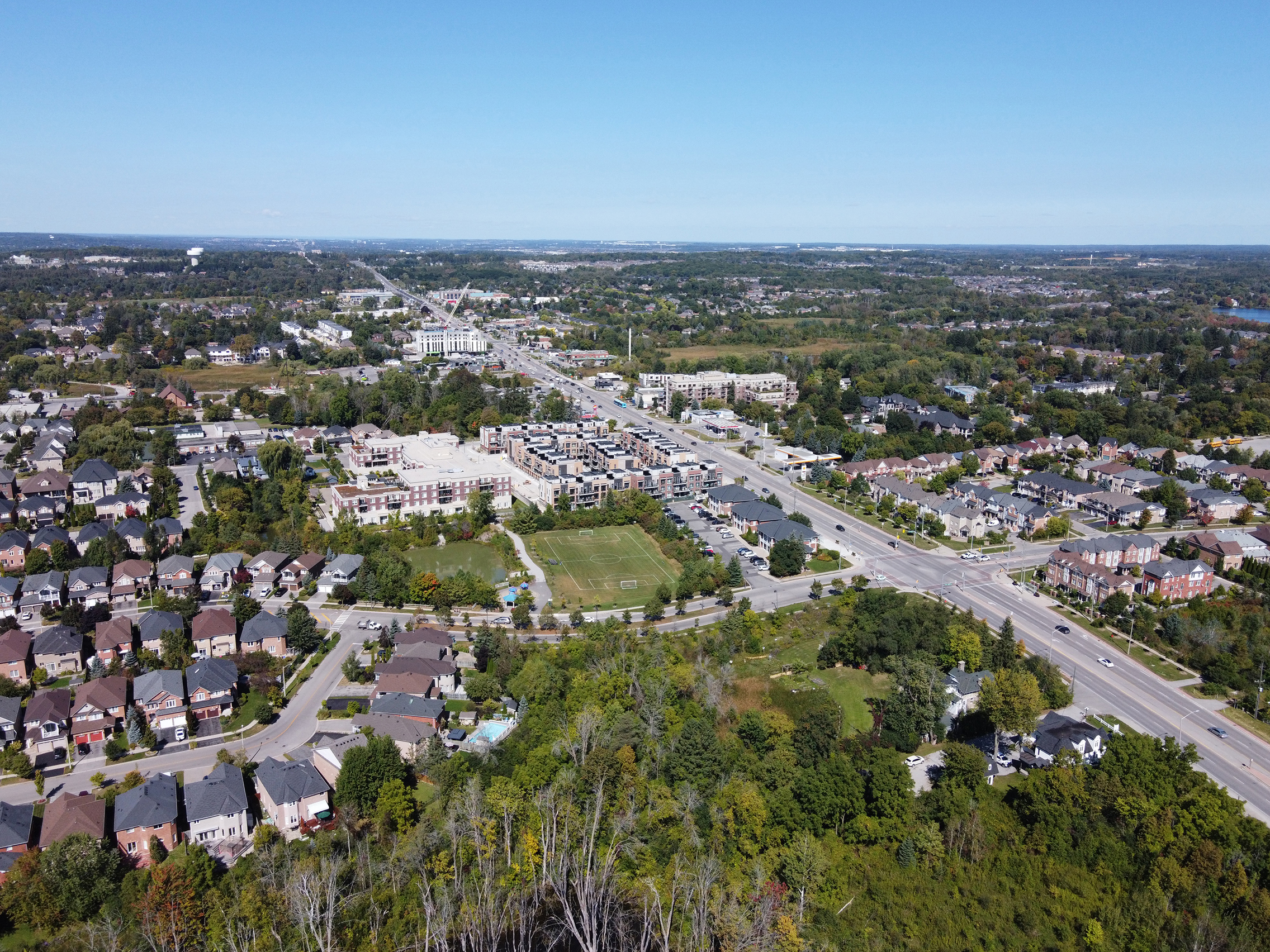
- Oak Ridges aerial view in 2023
- Interactive map of Oak Ridges
- Coordinates: 43°56′40.23″N 79°27′17.74″W
- Country: Canada
- Province: Ontario
- Regional Municipality: York Region
- Town: Richmond Hill

Government
  - MP: Costas Menegakis
  - MPP: Michael Parsa
  - Councillor: Carol Davidson
- Elevation: 300 m (980 ft)

Population (2016)
  - Total: 18,520
- Forward sortation area: L4E

Oak Ridges is an unincorporated community of Richmond Hill, Ontario, Canada, and has been part of the city since 1971. It forms the northern portion of the municipality's boundary, where it borders Aurora. Located about 20 km north of the northern border of Toronto and about 35 km from Downtown Toronto, it has a population of 18,520 (2016). The community developed around Lake Wilcox, the largest lake in the area, and has continued to expand slowly since its annexation by the Town (now City) of Richmond Hill. In the 1990s, Oak Ridges experienced moderate growth, which spurred environmental action by numerous organizations. Population has grown significantly as a result of development initiatives along Bayview Avenue. The Oak Ridges Community Centre was built and completed in June 2012 to accommodate community demand.

It is located north of the main urban area of Richmond Hill (which begins just south of Lake Wilcox), east of King City, immediately south of Aurora, and west of Whitchurch-Stouffville.

Oak Ridges can sometimes be considered separate from Richmond Hill, given the differences in current and future development patterns and plans and a large natural area forming a physical separation between Oak Ridges and urban Richmond Hill.

== Geography ==
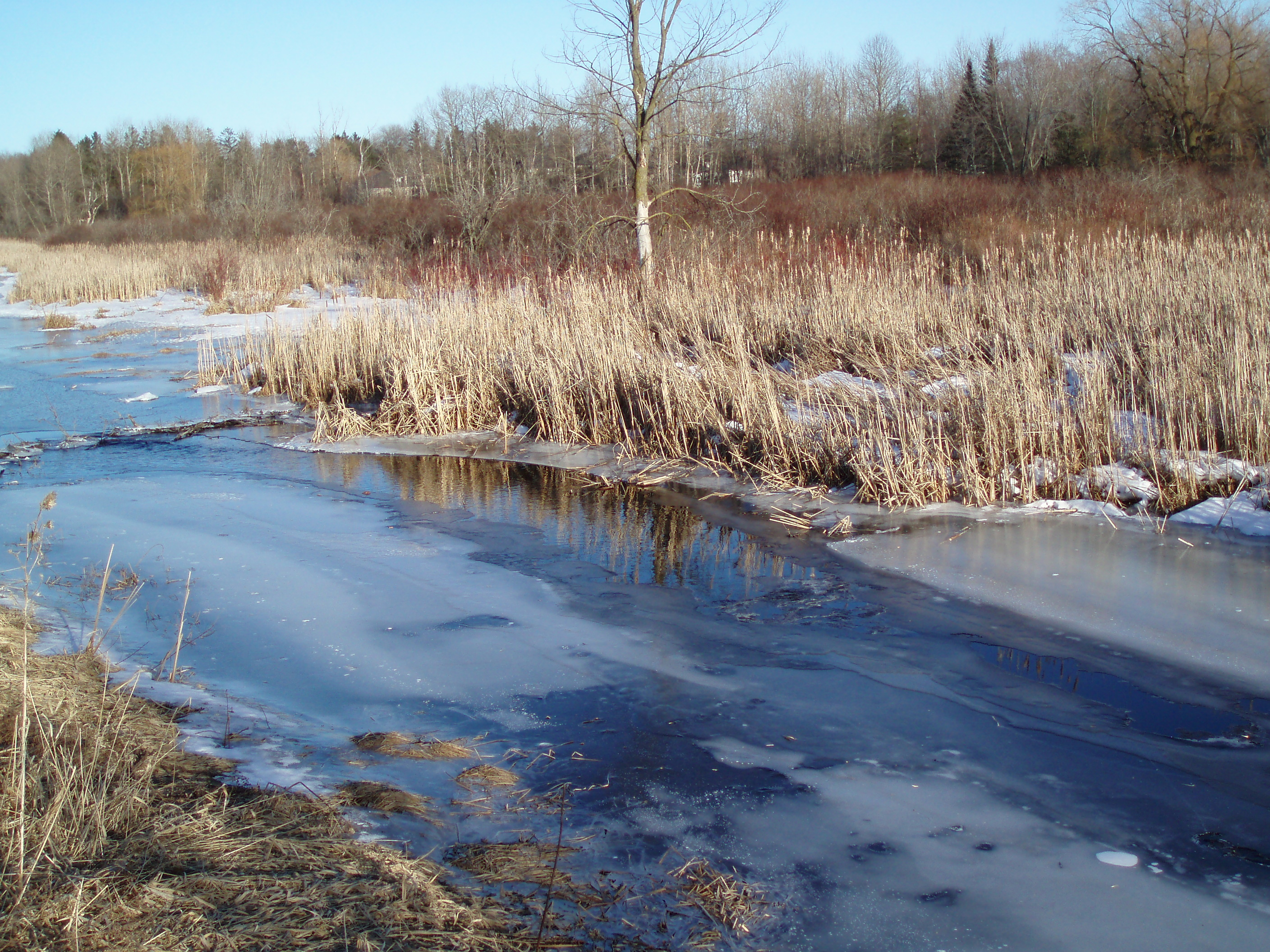
The East Humber River in winter

Wholly situated on the Oak Ridges Moraine, much of its terrain is hilly, with pine forests and small creeks still prospering in the east and southwest. The hilly terrain elevates Oak Ridges above surrounding areas, with most of the area sitting above 300 metres or 1000 feet above sea level. A number of small kettle lakes are located in Oak Ridges; the largest of these is Lake Wilcox, with the smaller Bond Lake, Philips Lake, Swan Lake and Lake St. George located nearby. Lake Wilcox has a small beach area, and is used for recreational purposes and camp activities in the summer. The lakes are the origin tributaries for the East Humber River.

Until the 1990s, farmlands used to dominate the northern part of Oak Ridges, except in the east. The western edge of Oak Ridges is now entirely residential or commercial; the McLeod's Landing development in the southwest consumed the last undeveloped land in the western part of Oak Ridges. This development was part of a contentious political battle that ultimately became an issue in the 2003 Ontario provincial election. In their campaign, the Liberal party promised to halt development on the Oak Ridges Moraine, specifically in Richmond Hill (see; Politics of the Oak Ridges Moraine for a more extensive discussion and; Development in Oak Ridges for ongoing development in Oak Ridges).

The natural areas around Bond Lake, known as the Oak Ridges Corridor, is the last contiguous conservation connection along Yonge Street, connecting the eastern and western portions of the Greenbelt and Oak Ridges Moraine. The Oak Ridges Corridor features an extensive trail system around Bond Lake and the eastern side of Lake Wilcox, with some of the best hiking and mountain biking terrain in Southern Ontario. Before earning protected land status in the 1990s and 2000s the area to the east of Lake Wilcox was a popular ATV and dirt-bike location for local residents.

== History ==
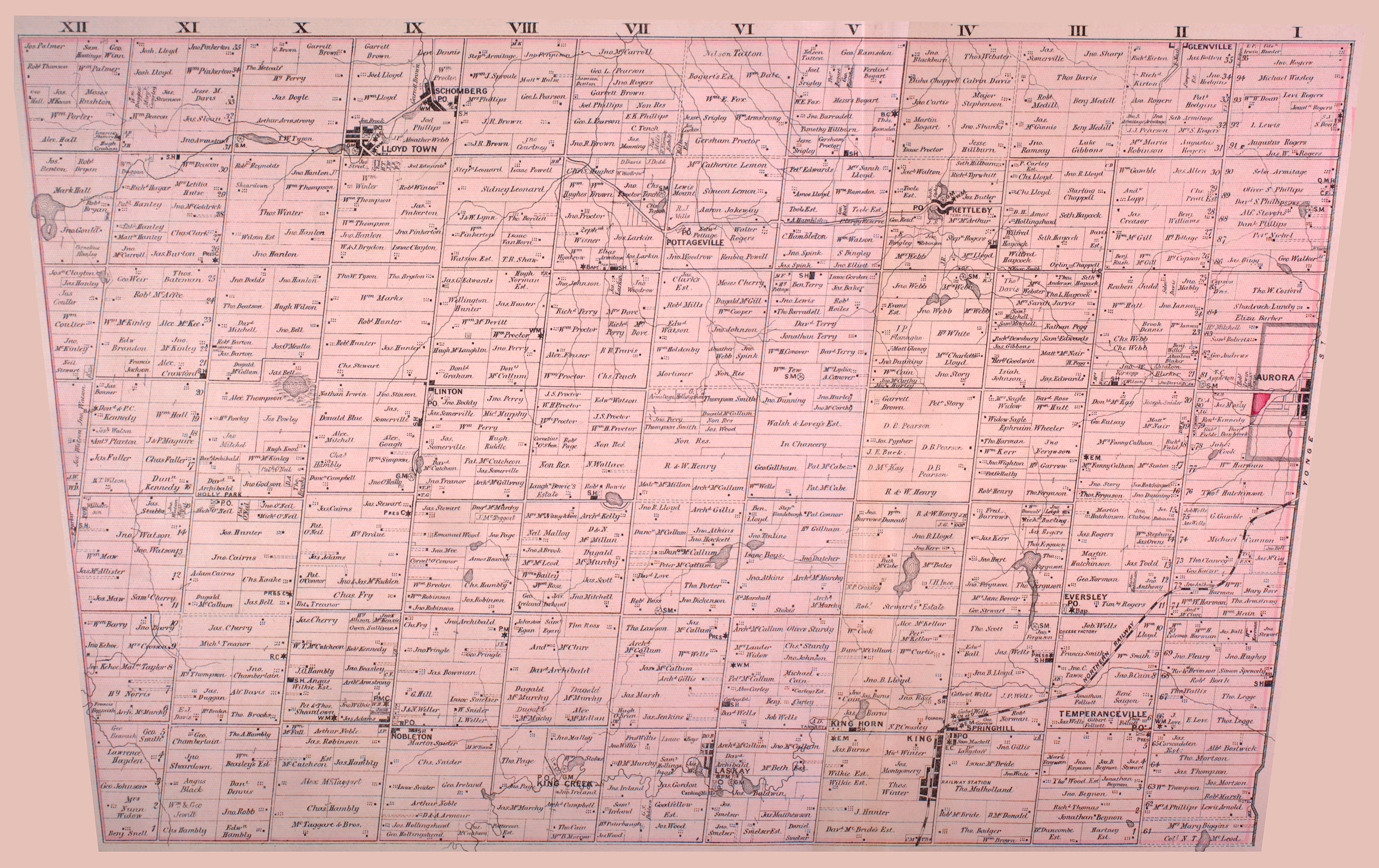
A map of the southern portion of King Township from 1878. At the time, the township's boundaries extended to Yonge Street. Lots 61–70 on the map represent the northern portion of the western half of modern-day Oak Ridges.

Oak Ridges was established along Yonge Street in 1799 by Joseph Geneviève and a group of French Royalists, who were granted land to settle by the British government. They were also provided with rations and agricultural implements. It was originally named Windham in honour of Geneviève's friend William Windham, Secretary at War for Britain at the time. Geneviève soon departed to search for another site to settle, and by 1840 the settlement and the area from the King-Vaughan town line to the 15th sideroad became known as Oak Ridges. This included lots 61 to 70, the western half of which were in King, and the eastern half in the township of Whitchurch.

From 1896 until 1927, the Schomberg and Aurora Railway operated a rail service from Schomberg to Oak Ridges. The Oak Ridges station was located north of Bond Crescent on the west side of Yonge Street, and resulted in the community being split into Oak Ridges north of the station and Schomberg Junction south of the station. The latter name was discontinued sometime after the railway ceased operations. Remnants of the old Bond Lake Station can be seen around the lake. The former Bond Lake Park and Bond Lake Hotel also once stood along the shores of the lake.

Oak Ridges was annexed from King and Whitchurch by the Town of Richmond Hill in 1971 when York County was reconstructed into the Regional Municipality of York. Oak Ridges had been in steep decline in the 1960s, largely due to high unemployment, lack of commercial development and motorcycle gang activity, specifically around Lake Wilcox. However, in recent decades, suburbanization stimulated growth in the community, after being annexed by Richmond Hill.

Oak Ridges was the site of the first methadone clinic in Ontario; it opened in 1995, but has since moved to Newmarket, due to lack of patronage and local support.

Until 2008, Oak Ridges cable provider was Aurora Cable Internet (ACI), an independent service provider exclusive to Aurora and Oak Ridges. In 2008, ACI was purchased by Rogers Cable, who now provide cable and internet services to the area.

Oak Ridges was also the home of a "Junior B" hockey team, the Oak Ridges Dynes, playing out of the now torn down old Oak Ridges Community Centre. The team was active from 1976 to 1981, winning the Mid Ontario Junior B Hockey League in the 1976-1977 and 1977–1978 seasons.

== Development ==
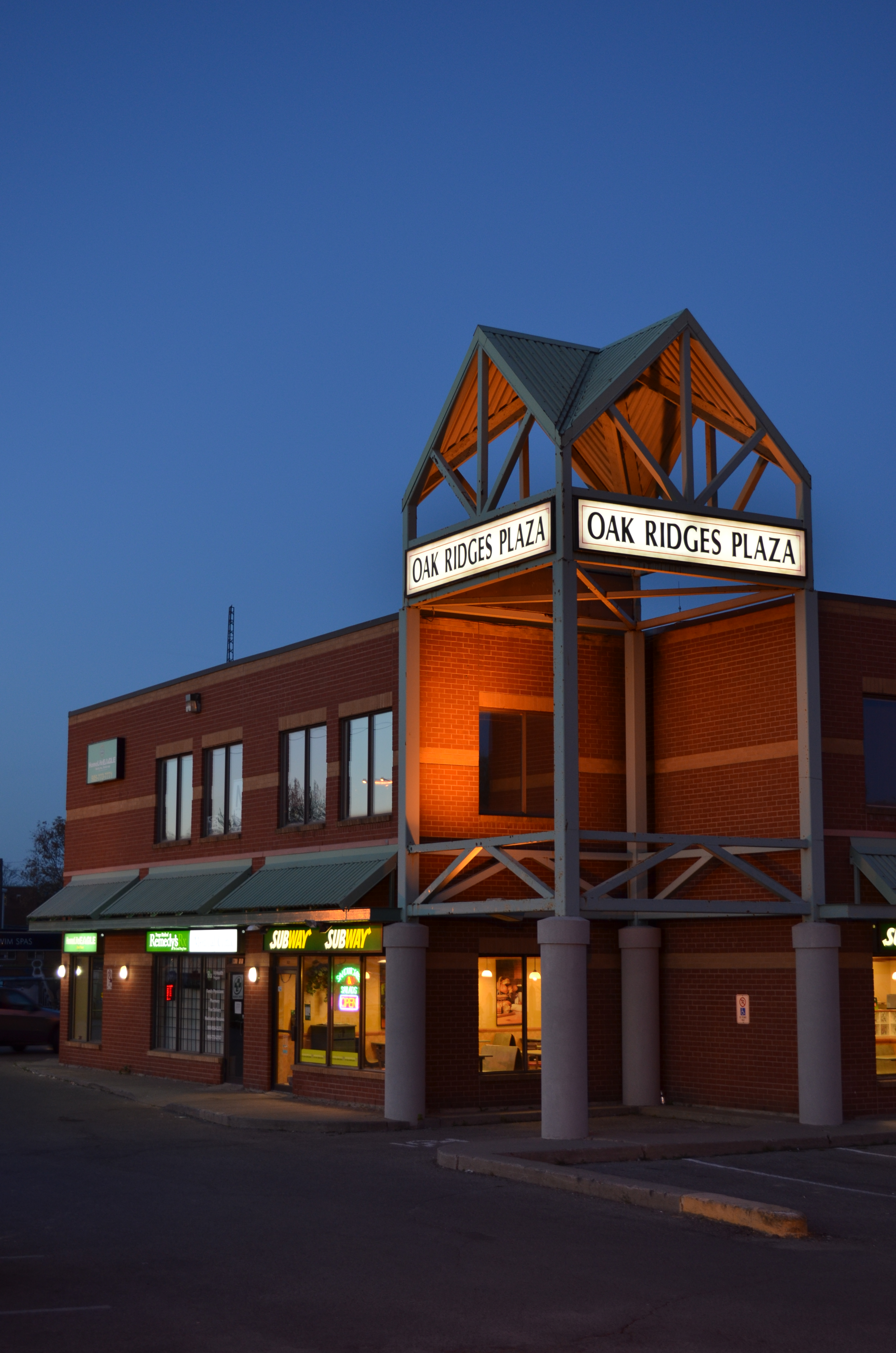
Oak Ridges Plaza

=== Past developments ===
Housing developments began to boom around Lake Wilcox in the 1950s and the west-central part. The suburban housing developments did not continue until the mid to late 1980s in the northwestern part. In the 1990s, it reached the northwestern part. In the late-1990s housing reached the southwestern and the northwestern parts.

The developments affected the forests of the Oak Ridges Moraine which supplies water to the Greater Toronto Area which it was believed would cause environmental damage to Toronto and local communities. It continued for about two years. There were protests against the clear-cutting of forests of the Oak Ridges Moraine. In about 2001, Bayview began to expand to connect with the rest of Bayview. In 2002, the housing developments stopped. Urban developments are presently developing southwest of Oak Ridges.

=== Ongoing developments ===
Previously protected land in the northeastern portion of Oak Ridges along Bloomington Road, directly to the east of Yonge St. has had its protected land status removed by the Richmond Hill Town Council. The land is currently owned by Baif Developments. It got a plan of subdivision approved about 10 years ago in an Ontario Municipal Board hearing. Construction was set to begin in 2010–2011, however on this property only 25% of the lots are able to be built. The site has seen fierce opposition and has been surrounded at entry points by road barriers spray painted with phrases such as, "No Subdivision". The Town of Richmond Hill has declared these barriers, "Holdings Symbols", and their removal order is pending. The barriers interfere with preparations regarding the shortage of sewer allocation from the York Region and the developers have been waiting to build. The application to remove the "Holdings Symbols" is due to the fact that the sewer allocation has become partially available. Once more sewer allocation is available they will be able to proceed fully. The land in question is still in its natural state, with the exception of some removal of trees. In the 2003 Ontario provincial election the Liberal party promised to halt development on the Oak Ridges Moraine, specifically in Richmond Hill.

Previously protected land around Bond Lake along Old Colony Road, directly to the east of Yonge St. has had its protected land status removed by the Richmond Hill Town Council in 2008 and development there by Lebovic Homes is fully underway. Ultimately the elimination of almost all current forests around Bond Lake and expand its subdivision into what is currently natural habitat will occur by 2011. Opposition has been minimal after Richmond Hill Town Council voted to open up almost all protected land to development. Approximately one-third of the land in question is still in its natural state. This site has not seen any protests since 2008. Some government agencies claim to have declared this property a park and that it will never see development, however the construction is ongoing.

Currently, there is extensive development occurring along King Road, where older existing housing from the 1950s is being torn down, making way for higher density townhomes.

== Education ==
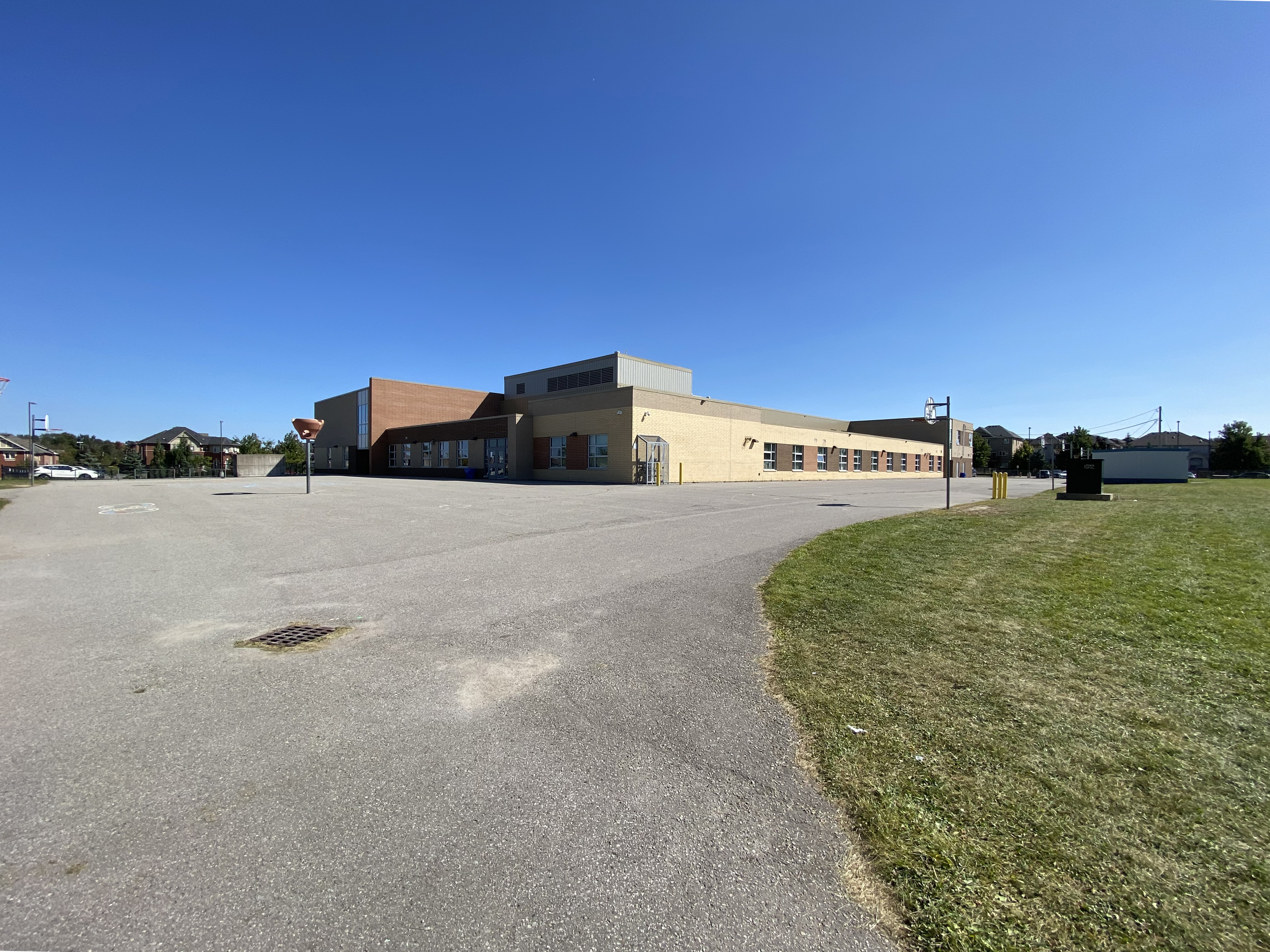
Kettle Lakes Public School

Oak Ridges now boasts 9 publicly funded elementary schools and 1 private; 5 public, 4 catholic; 8 English, 1 French. Bond Lake Public School, Father Frederick McGinn, Our Lady of Hope Catholic School, Our Lady of the Annunciation Catholic Elementary School, Oak Ridges Public School, Lake Wilcox Public School, Windham Ridge Public School, Kettle Lakes Public School and Académie de la Moraine (Conseil scolaire de district Centre-Sud-Ouest, up to grade 8). These schools fall under the York Region District School Board or the York Catholic District School Board. Additionally, the Academy for Gifted Children- P.A.C.E. runs from grades 1 through 12.

There are no high schools within Oak Ridges. Cardinal Carter Catholic High School is located near the northern border with Aurora on the north side of Bloomington Road, within walking distance for most Catholic Oak Ridges students. École secondaire catholique Renaissance, a French Catholic school operated by Conseil scolaire de district catholique Centre-Sud, is at the corner of Bloomington Road and Bathurst Street in Aurora, near Oak Ridges. Aurora High School (Ontario) is where a majority of the French Immersion student attend.

== Demographics ==
As of the 2016 census, the Aurora-Oak Ridges-Richmond Hill Census Tract's top three ethnic groups are Chinese (14.2%), Italian (12.7%), and Iranian (6.9%).

== Medical facilities ==
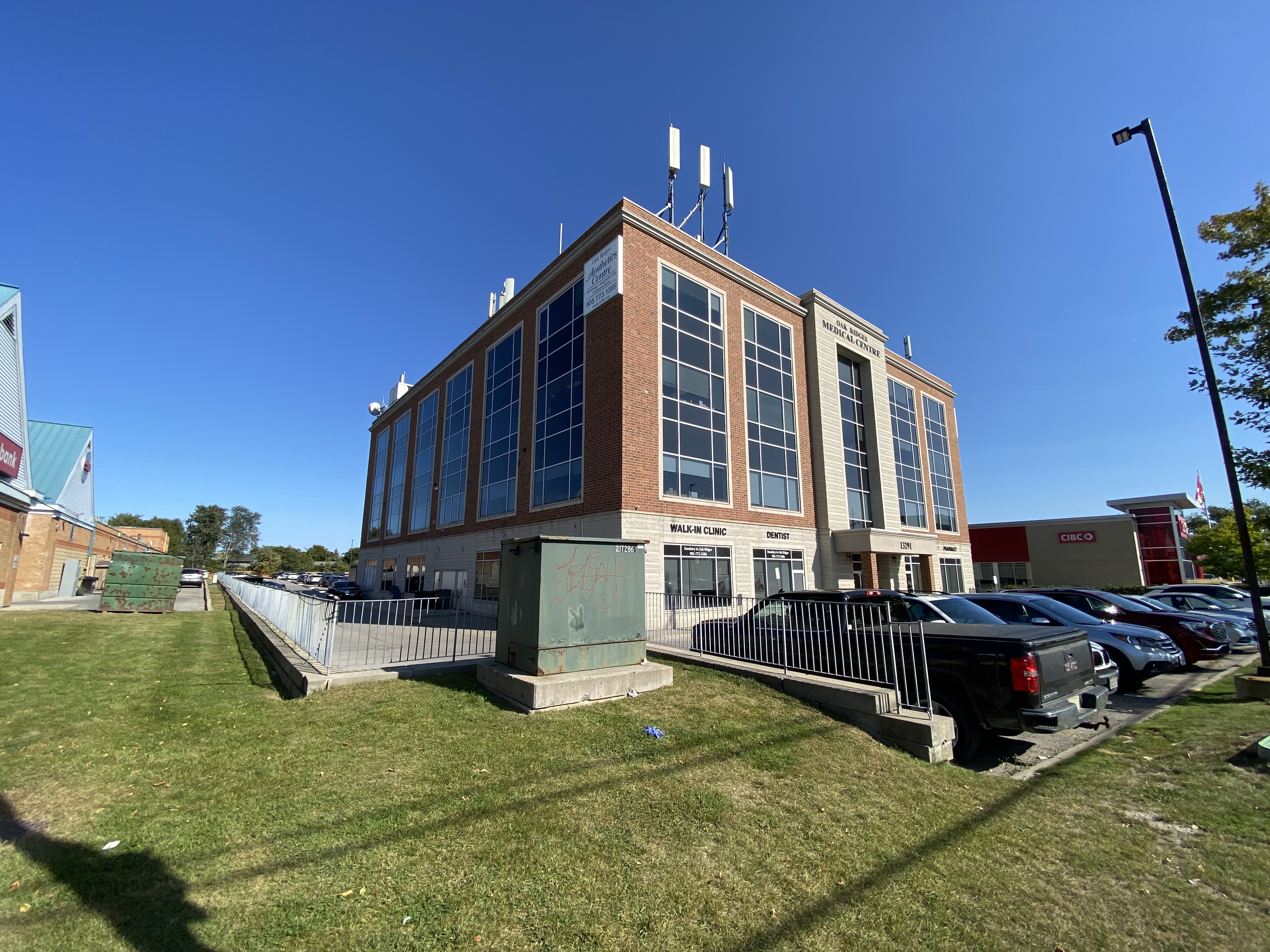
The Oak Ridges Medical Centre

The Oak Ridges Medical Centre opened in 2007 and provides various services, including medical imaging, dentistry, optometry, dermatology, and a walk-in clinic with an urgent care centre (limited hours). The centre is located at 13291 Yonge Street, north of King Road.

== Transportation ==
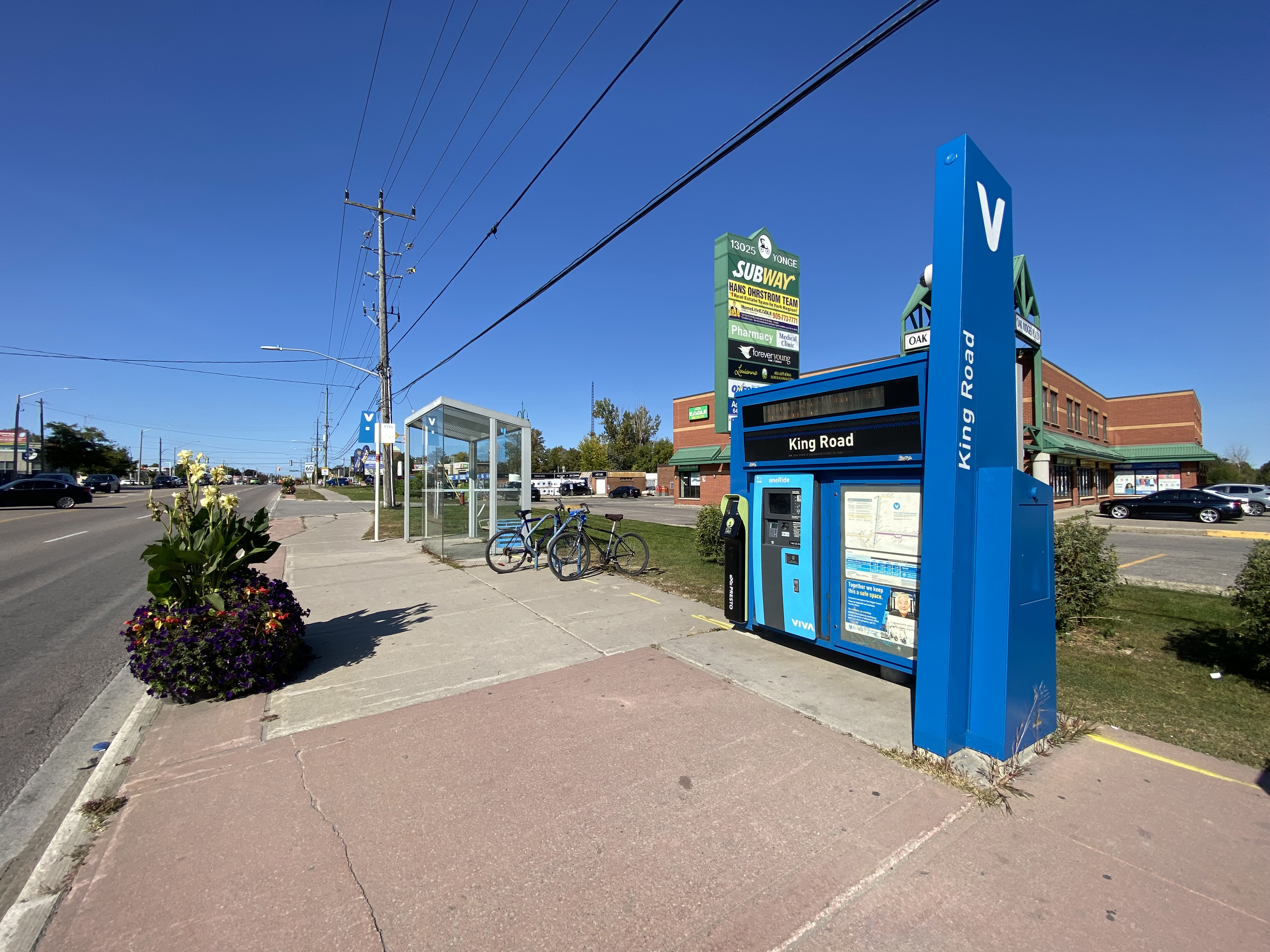
King Road VIVA station

Yonge Street is the main transportation artery through the community, running north to Aurora and south to Richmond Hill. To the east is Highway 404, which is accessed via Stouffville Road in the south and Bloomington Road in the north. To the west is Highway 400, accessed via King Road through King City.

The CN Bala Subdivision (Toronto - Orillia - Sudbury) rail line lies to the east but has no station in Oak Ridges currently. The Gormley GO Station, located on Stouffville Road between Leslie Road and Highway 404, began service in December 2016. The station is located on the Richmond Hill line.

York Region Transit is the public transportation system, who also operate the Viva Blue bus service; a limited-stop route which travels on Yonge Street from Finch subway station to Newmarket, passing through Oak Ridges stopping along Yonge St at: Bloomington Road, Regatta Avenue, and King Road. Five other York Region Transit routes go through Oak Ridges;

- Route 88 which travels from Finch subway station on Bathurst Street to Seneca College's King Campus
- Route 91B which travels from Richmond Hill Centre Terminal on Bayview Avenue to Bloomington Rd (rush-hour only)
- Route 96 which travels from Newmarket on Yonge Street, King Road, and Keele Street via King to Pioneer Village subway station on Steeles Avenue
- and Route 98 which travels from East Gwillimbury(at Green Lane) on Yonge Street to Bernard Terminal north of Elgin Mills Road.
- Viva Blue (bus rapid transit service) which travels from Finch subway station with a stop at Yonge and King Road.

There are three GO Train Stations nearby, Bloomington and Gormley, on the Richmond Hill GO line, and King City on the Barrie GO line.

== Other services ==
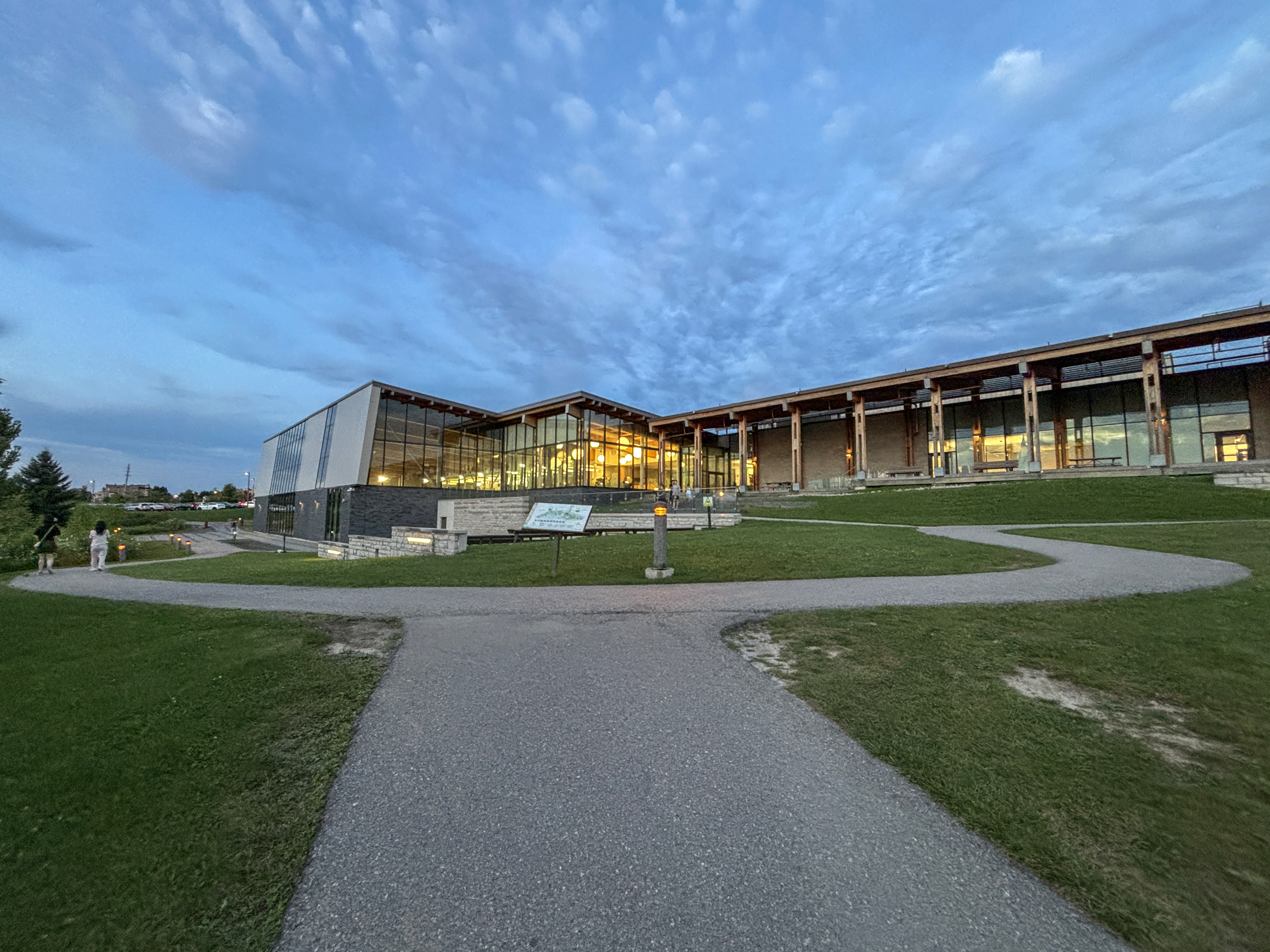
The Oak Ridges Community Centre

Oak Ridges has 2 post offices. The main one is at the corner of Yonge St. and King Rd., while a much smaller one is at the corner of Yonge St. and Aubrey Ave.

Oak Ridges is home to the Our Lady of the Annunciation Roman Catholic Church, the local Catholic Parish. There is also the Chabad Jewish Centre, located on Yonge Street, next to Bond Lake.

The Oak Ridges community is home to the Oak Ridges Soccer Club whose 1500+ members make it the community's largest service organization. The ORSC has youth soccer programs for ages 4 to 18 in both house league and competitive levels. The soccer club office is located at 39 King Road, former site of the Oak Ridges Public Library and the former Oak Ridges Fire Hall.

The Oak Ridges Kings are the local hockey team, playing in the Simcoe Region Local League.

Of the areas many small lakes, Lake Wilcox is the only with public road access, and sees high visitor numbers throughout the year with recent park renovations, including a boardwalk into the water. The Oak Ridges Community Centre sits on the eastern shore of Lake Wilcox, boasting a gym, basketball courts, olympic sized pools and more.

== Settlements ==
- Gormley, southeast - A small community in the southeast. It is linked with the CN Rail and has about 4 streets including Gormley Road.
- Temperanceville, west - Mostly in Oak Ridges (partially in King township), located at the intersection of King and Bathurst. It is the location of the historic Temperanceville United Church.
- Lake Wilcox, central Oak Ridges- Original area of settlement in Oak Ridges, around Lake Wilcox.

== In popular culture ==
- Ivan Reitman's 1973 horror, Cannibal Girls, was partially filmed here. The former OPP station, Gulf station and Oak Motel on Yonge Street are all shown.
