= North Yonge Railways =

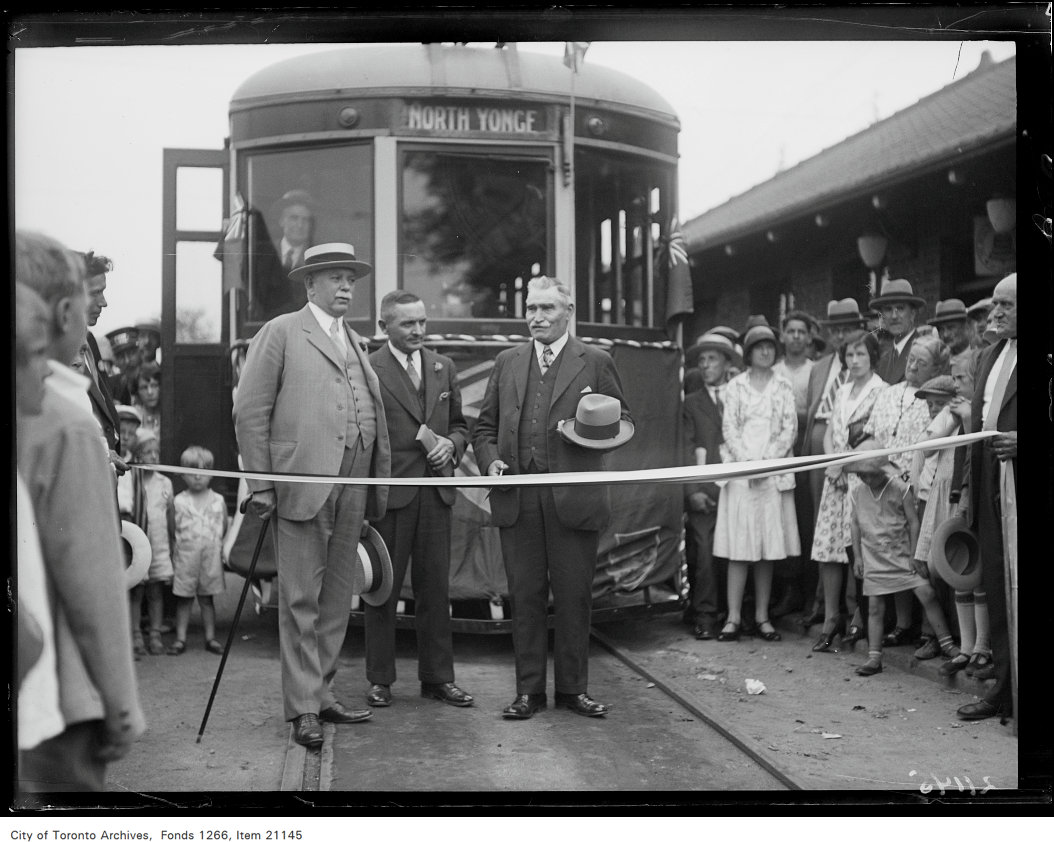
- Tape cutting ceremony at the opening of the North Yonge Railways, 1930

Overview
- Headquarters: Toronto
- Locale: North York Township and York County
- Dates of operation: 1930–1948
- Predecessor: Toronto and York Radial Railway, Metropolitan Division
- Successor: Toronto Transportation Commission North Yonge bus route

Technical
- Track gauge: 4 ft 10 7/8 in (1,495 mm) Toronto gauge
- Length: 13.55 miles (21.81 km) - Toronto (North York) to Richmond Hill

The North Yonge Railways was a radial railway line operated by the Toronto Transportation Commission from 1930 to 1948 between Glen Echo (Toronto) and Richmond Hill. The line was created by reopening the southern portion of the TTC's Lake Simcoe radial line that had closed in 1930.

== Operations ==
The North Yonge Railways ran along Yonge Street from Glen Echo Terminal at the then-Toronto city limits through the municipalities of North York (Willowdale, Lansing, Bedford Park, Teddington Park), Thornhill (now part of Vaughan and Markham) and Richmond Hill. The line was single-track with passing loops and ran almost entirely on the side of the road, with an off-street terminal at Glen Echo and some centre-of-street track in Richmond Hill. The TTC used the Nachod block signal system on the line. The line had a 550-volt substation in Willowdale, which replaced older substations that had been used on the Lake Simcoe line closed in 1930.

Service was hourly from Glen Echo to Richmond Hill, every 30 minutes to Steeles Avenue with more frequent service during rush hours. Initially, the last car from Glen Echo was at 12:40 am and the first car was at 5:00 am. However, from April 14, 1942, night service started with trips leaving Glen Echo at 1:20 am, 3:40am and 3:50 am.

The line used double-ended, one-man radial cars (numbered 409-416) that Hydro-Electric Railways had once used on its Mimico line. They were housed at the TTC's Eglinton Carhouse.

== History ==
On July 17, 1930, the TTC's Lake Simcoe line (previously known as the Metropolitan line) running from Glen Echo in North York to Sutton, Ontario was closed being replaced by bus service. However, three months later on October 9, 1930, the portion from Glen Echo to Richmond Hill reopened as the North Yonge Railways. To restart service, the Townships of North York, Markham and Vaughan and the Village of Richmond Hill had acquired their portion of the line and contracted with the Toronto Transportation Commission to run it.

On May 14, 1934, the north end of the line in Richmond Hill was shortened by 91 m (300 ft) to accommodate highway widening.

Effective April 14, 1942, the TTC started night service to Richmond Hill at the request of the municipalities owning the line.

On November 11, 1946, buses started to supplement radial cars during the rush hours, a practice that would continue until the radial line's abandonment. The reasons for the bus supplements were increased ridership, an insufficient number of radial cars and power shortages.

On October 9, 1948, the radial cars had their last day of service, and were replaced by buses the next day. However the line remained intact. The TTC had insufficient funds to replace the worn-out infrastructure such as rails and cars, or to double-track the line which was being considered. An electrical power shortage provided an excuse to temporarily replace the radial cars with buses for six months. At the end of the six months, North York Township advised residents that buses would be less expensive than rail vehicles to service Yonge Street.

On September 26, 1949, the ratepayers within the municipalities that owned the line voted to make the replacement bus service permanent. Very few ratepayers chose to vote on the issue.

On November 24, 1949, the dismantlement of the line started, and was completed in spring 1950.

== Successors ==
The service was replaced by the Toronto Transportation Commission's North Yonge bus route in 1948. North Yonge bus was renumbered as 59 North Yonge route (after 1956) which ran from Eglinton Avenue and (later from Sheppard Avenue when 97 Yonge route extended northwards and the Yonge Subway was extended north to Finch) to Richmond Hill. 59 North Yonge route ended in 1977 and take over by 97 Yonge, but with bus service to Steeles Avenue (looping east on Yonge and Steeles Avenue East).

Service north of Steeles Avenue was provided by a number of other operators. In 1975 GO Transit began bus service (initially contracted to Gray Coach) from the TTC 59 North Yonge route with the Newmarket B/Route 62 and Yonge C/Route 63 from York Mills subway station (later from Finch Station) to Richmond Hill GO Station and terminating at Newmarket. In 2003 GO Transit transferred Yonge C bus service to York Regional Transit's bus which runs two local routes 98 Yonge North (Richmond Hill to Newmarket) and 99 Yonge South (Richmond Hill to Finch Station). In 2005 VIVA Blue was added to provide express service from Finch Station to Newmarket. All three York Region routes terminate at the Newmarket Bus Terminal at Eagle Street West and Davis Drive.

And in the future, rail service will be restored to Richmond Hill in the form of the Line 1 Yonge-University line extended to Richmond Hill by 2030.

== Fleet ==
=== Series 409–416 ===
Cars 409–416
- In service: 1930–1948
- Manufacturer: Ottawa Car Company
- Constructed: 1924 (409–412); 1925 (413–416)
- Entered service: 1930
- Number built: 19
- Number in service: 8
- Number preserved: 1 (416)
- Fleet numbers: 409–416
- Capacity: 44 seats
- Operator: TTC
- Depot: Eglinton Carhouse

Specifications
- Width: 8' 2-⁷/₈" (2,511 mm)
- Height: 10' 10-¾" (3321 mm)
- Multiple working: equipped for but not used
- Track gauge: 4 ft 10 7/8 in (1,495 mm) Toronto gauge

In 1924–1925, the Ottawa Car Company built 19 double-ended, standard-gauge cars for the Hydro-Electric Railways Numbering the cars 401–419, Hydro assigned 11 cars (401–408 & 417–419) to the Sandwich, Windsor and Amherstburg Railway in the Windsor area and the remaining 8 cars (409–416) to the Toronto and York Mimico radial line to Port Credit. At the time of the purchase, Hydro managed both operations under contract on behalf of local municipalities which owned the lines.

The cars had some provision for multiple-unit train control, but that feature was not implemented for the cars in Toronto-area service.

In 1928, cars 409–416 became surplus when the Toronto Transportation Commission replaced the Mimico radial to Brown's Line with the Lake Shore streetcar line. The TTC sent cars 409-416 to the Hillcrest Complex for conversion to single-ended, pay-as-you-enter cars to run on Toronto gauge track. The second control panel was covered over but retained for a possible conversion back to double-ended operation. The cars then served the Bathurst streetcar route operating out of the St. Clair Carhouse.

When radial service was restored on Yonge Street between Glen Echo and Richmond Hill in 1930, cars 409–416 were converted back to double-ended operation for service there. When the North Yonge line closed in 1948, the cars were put into storage, and later scrapped by (Western Iron and Metal Co) or sold off.

Car 416, the only surviving car of the series, was used as a house in Hillsburgh, Ontario until 1972. The Halton County Radial Railway then acquired the car for restoration.

== Facilities ==
Here are the major facilities of the North Yonge Railways, none of which exist today:

- Glen Echo terminal: interchange with Yonge streetcar line; car house and site now used by Loblaws supermarket
- Eglinton carhouse: stored Yonge streetcars as well as radial cars for the North Yonge Railways; converted to bus garage by TTC and partially demolished
- Richmond Hill: at the north-east corner on Yonge Street and Lorne Avenue; now site of retail plaza

== See also ==
- List of Ontario railways
- List of defunct Canadian railways

Preceded by Metropolitan radial line 1892–1930	North Yonge Railways; 1930–1948	Succeeded by Toronto Transportation Commission North Yonge bus route
