= Teddington Park =

Coordinates: 43.734184°N 79.400962°W

- Neighbourhood
- Interactive map of Teddington Park
- Country: Canada
- Province: Ontario
- City: Toronto
- Municipality established: 1850 York Township
- Changed municipality: 1922 North York from York Township
- Changed municipality: 1998 Toronto from North York

Government
  - MP: Rob Oliphant (Don Valley West)
  - MPP: Stephanie Bowman (Don Valley West)
  - Councillor: Rachel Chernos Lin (Ward 15 Don Valley West)

Teddington Park is a neighbourhood in Toronto, Ontario, Canada. It is bordered by Yonge Street to the west and Bayview Avenue to the east, and from Snowden Road in the south to north of Glen Echo Road and Rosedale Golf Club. Development occurred in and around the 1930s, and was farmland before that time.

The neighbourhood is primarily residential (mostly home to the affluent) with only a small stretch of retail businesses along Yonge Street, in addition to the Rosedale Golf Club.

== Transportation ==
Via Yonge Street Teddington Park is connected to Highway 401 within a five- to ten-minute drive.

Glen Echo Drive is the main local street in the area. Mount Pleasant Road and Yonge Streets are the major roads in the area.

=== Glen Echo ===
Glen Echo Road was the terminus of the North Yonge Railways radial line until 1947. From 1892 to 1930 it was served by the Metropolitan line. The terminus hosted a large terminal structure, car barn and freight shed were located northwest of Glen Echo Road. After the end of the radial line, the site became Toronto Transportation Commission's Glen Echo Loop serving North Yonge buses (1948-1956), later replaced with the 59 North Yonge (1956-1977) and the current 97 Yonge bus (1977–present). The bus loop was no longer in use (terminal shed demolished in 1976-1977) in the late 1970s and the car barn became a dealership and North York Township Market; those were demolished (1985–87), and the site is currently occupied by a Loblaws supermarket.

The Yonge-University-Spadina line runs on the western boundary of Teddington Park. There are no subway stations within the neighbourhood, though both York Mills Station and Lawrence Station are nearby.

== Notable people ==
- William McDougall was born and owned land in the area of Lawrence and Yonge (northeast side) to the north of farm land of Peter Lawrence Jacob Lawrence.
