= Donald Mann =

Canadian railway entrepreneur (1853–1934)

Sir Donald Mann
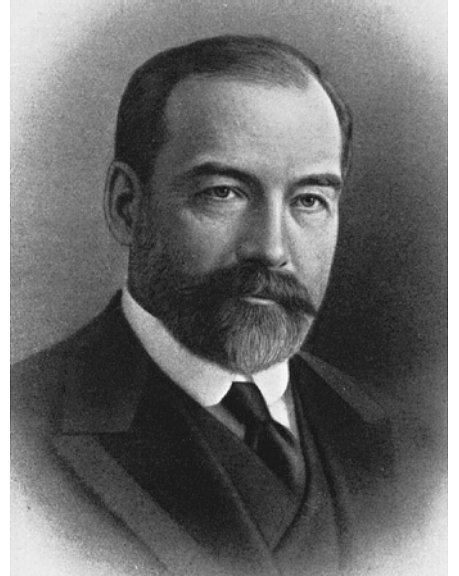
- Donald D. Mann (1907)
- Born: Donald Daniel Mann; March 23, 1853; Acton, Canada West
- Died: November 10, 1934 (aged 81); Toronto, Ontario, Canada
- Resting place: Acton, Ontario, Canada
- Occupation: Entrepreneur
- Known for: Canadian Northern Railway; Toronto Suburban Railway
- Spouse: Jane Emily Williams (after 1887) (1858-1945)

Sir Donald Daniel Mann (March 23, 1853 – November 10, 1934), who was also referred to as "Dan" or "D.D." before his knighthood, was a Canadian railway contractor and entrepreneur.

== Biography ==
Born at Acton, Canada West, Mann studied as a Methodist minister but worked in lumber camps in Parry Sound District and Michigan for eight years before moving to Winnipeg, Manitoba, in 1879. During the 1880s he worked as a contractor for the Canadian Pacific Railway under James Ross and Herbert Samuel Holt, building sections of rail across the prairies and through the Rocky Mountains.

Partnering with William Mackenzie in 1886, Mann built railway lines in Western Canada, Maine, and Chile. They also went to China to pursue opportunities, but found the red tape there too great an obstacle to overcome. While there, he was challenged to a duel by a Russian count, who later withdrew when Mann advised him that he would choose to use the broadaxe, claiming it to be Canada's national weapon.

By 1895, the effects of the CPR monopoly on freight rates in Western Canada, together with its refusal to build branch lines into the northern prairie, prompted Clifford Sifton to offer federal bond guarantees to any other enterprise that wished to construct railways there. Mackenzie and Mann took up the offer, and began the process of purchasing and building such lines. They would later be consolidated in 1898 to become the Canadian Northern Railway (CNoR), a line which would stretch from Vancouver Island, British Columbia, to Montreal, with other unconnected lines as far east as Cape Breton Island, Nova Scotia, which would form Canada's second transcontinental railway system. The CNoR would be the first railway to reach Edmonton, Alberta, and the full line was completed in 1915, upon the driving of the last spike in Basque, British Columbia. In recognition of their contributions to the development of Canada's railways, both Mann and Mackenzie were knighted in 1911.

Financial difficulties eventually resulted in the insolvency of the CNoR. It was nationalized by the federal government on September 6, 1918, and became the Canadian National Railway.

Mann developed other business opportunities on his own, which included coal mines and a related railway in Inverness County, Nova Scotia, the Winnipeg Street Railway, and multiple public utilities in Monterrey, Mexico.

Mann turned to oil drilling. He leased land in the Township of Vaughan, near the village of Concord, and sank a well in November 1922. In the spring of 1928, instead of oil, he found mineral water. Under the name Ontario Mineral Waters Ltd. he bottled and sold it as a health tonic named "Raysol Radium Water" effective against a variety of ailments including diabetes, angina, tuberculosis and rheumatism. $1 a bottle or $3 a gallon. The venture failed ostensibly because the water was very salty.

Mann died in 1934 at the age of 81, and was buried at Fairview Cemetery in Acton.

== Legacy ==
In 1969, a park was named for Sir Donald Mann in Acton, Ontario, the land of which once formed part of the farm on which he grew up. It is adjacent to the CNR track, and not far away from the former right of way once occupied by the Toronto Suburban Railway controlled by Mackenzie and Mann.

He, along with Mackenzie, was inducted into the Canadian Railway Hall of Fame in 2002.

He is also known for the Mann Cup, the trophy awarded to the senior men's lacrosse champions of Canada. The cup is made of solid gold, and it was donated in 1910.
