= William Mackenzie (railway entrepreneur) =

Canadian railway entrepreneur (1849–1923)

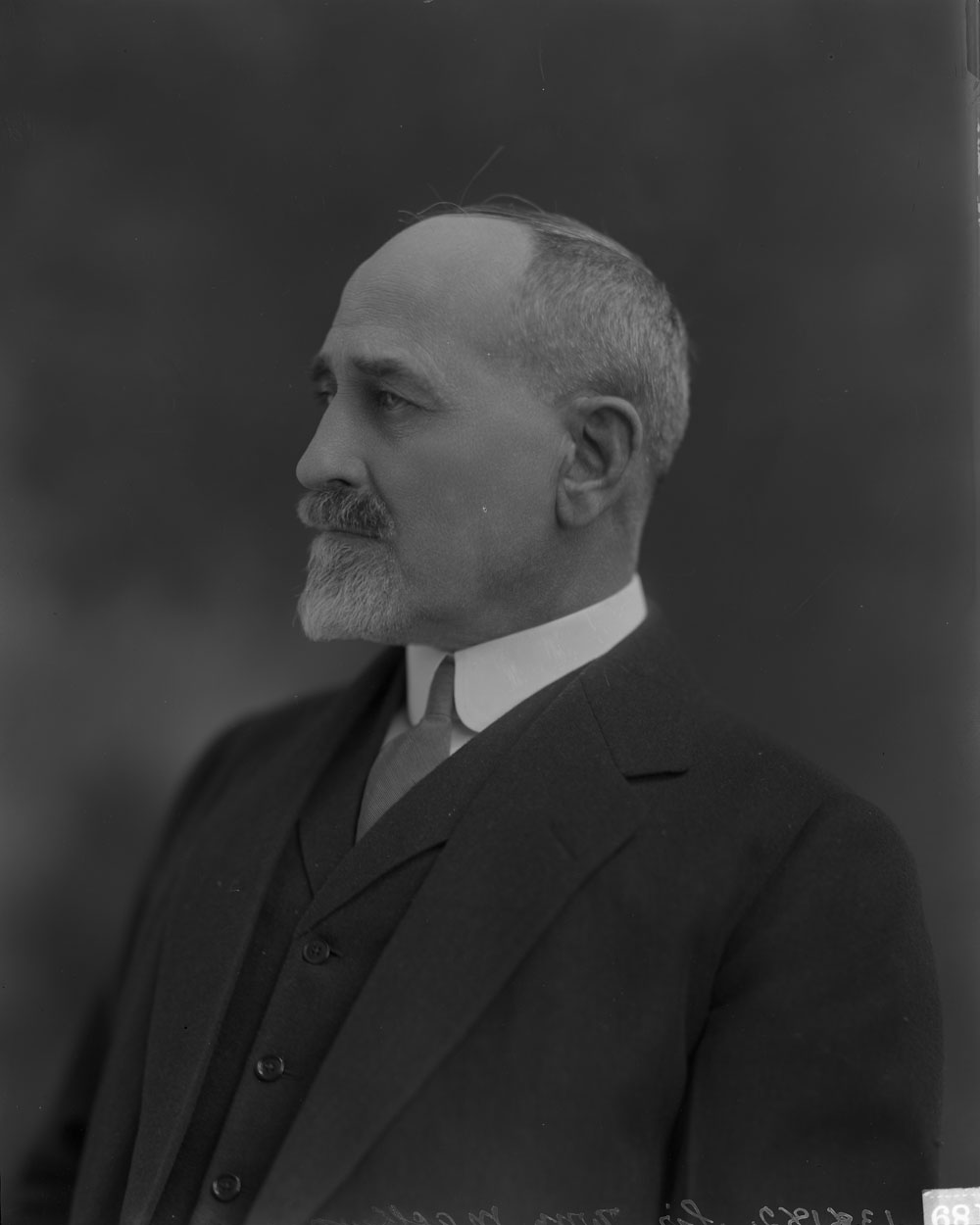
Sir William Mackenzie, 1917

Sir William Mackenzie (October 17, 1849 – December 5, 1923) was a Canadian railway contractor and entrepreneur.

Born near Peterborough, Canada West (now Ontario), Mackenzie became a teacher and politician before entering business as the owner of a sawmill and gristmill in Kirkfield, Ontario. He entered the railway business as a contractor under civil engineer James Ross, working on projects in Ontario, British Columbia, Maine, and the North-West Territories (present-day Saskatchewan and Alberta) between 1874 and 1891.

In partnership with his mentor James Ross, Mackenzie became owner of the Toronto Railway Company (precursor to the Toronto Transit Commission) in 1891 and in 1899, helped found the precursor to Brazilian Traction, for which he was the first chairman. In 1895, together with Donald Mann, Mackenzie began to purchase or build rail lines in the Canadian prairies, which would form the Canadian Northern Railway (CNoR), a company that would stretch from Vancouver Island to Cape Breton Island and form Canada's second transcontinental railway system. He started Pat Burns' career by giving him a series of contracts for provisioning food for the railway contract. Burns would go on to build one of the World's largest meat empires.

Mackenzie and Mann were knighted in 1911 for their efforts in the railway industry, but personal and company financial difficulties led to the bankruptcy of the CNoR. The system was nationalized by the federal government on September 6, 1918, and subsequently became part of the Canadian National Railway.

Mackenzie died in Toronto, Ontario. He was inducted into Ottawa's Canadian Railway Hall of Fame in 2002 along with partner Mann.
