= List of parks in Richmond Hill, Ontario =

The city of Richmond Hill, Ontario has 165 parks operated by the City of Richmond Hill Parks, Recreation, and Culture department.

== Municipal parks ==
=== A–B ===
- Ada Mackenzie
- Alias Grace Park
- Amos Wright Park
- Apple Grove Parkette
- Artisan Park
- Autumn Grove Park
- Baif Park
- Bayview Hill Park
- Bayview Parkette
- Beaufort Hills Park
- Beverly Acres Parkette
- Black Willow Park
- Bradstock Park
- Briar Nine Park & Reserve
- Brickworks Park
- Bridgeview Cordone Park
- Bridgeview Park
- Burr Park

=== C–E ===
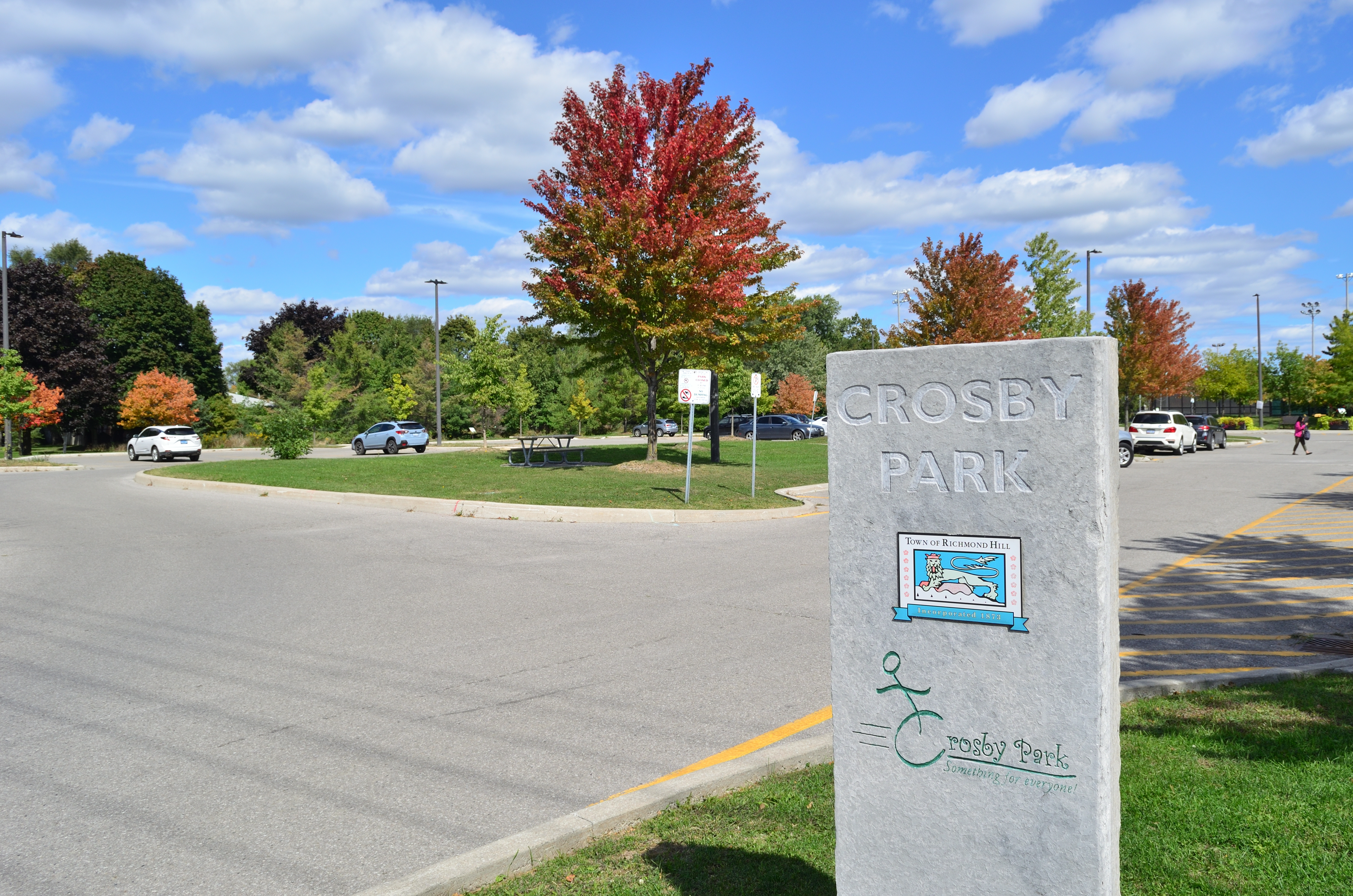
Crosby Park

- Cardinal Woods Park
- Carrville Park
- Channel Gate Parkette
- Chapman Park
- Coons Parkette
- Cordave Parkette
- Crosby Park
- David Dunlap Observatory Park
- David Hamilton Park
- Debonair Parkette
- Delbert Baker Pond & Garden
- Discovery Parkette
- Doncrest Valley
- Dorothy Price Park
- Dove Park
- Dovestone Park
- Dr. James Langstaff Community Park
- Essex ParketteEyer Homestead Park

=== F–H ===
- Fiddlehead Parkette
- Fontainbleu Park
- Four Winds Pond
- Frank Endean Parkette
- French Royalist Park
- Fulton Parkette
- Gapper Park
- Glenbrae Park
- Good Brothers Parkette
- Grace Lawrence Parkette
- Grist Mill Park
- Grovewood Park
- Harding Park
- Harrington Park
- Headwaters Community Park
- Helmkay Park
- Heritage Woods Park
- Heron Pond
- Hillcrest Heights Park
- Hillsview Park
- Horner Park
- Hughy Park
- Humber Flats Ecopark
- Hunter's Point Wildlife Park

=== J–L ===
- Jessie Vanek Park
- John Tipp Park
- Junction Parkette
- Karindon Park
- King's College Park
- Kozak Parkette
- Lake Wilcox Fish & Wildlife Refuge
- Lake Wilcox Park
- Larchmere Parkette
- Larratt Lea Park
- Laurentian Park
- Lavinia White Parkette
- Lennox Park
- Leno Park
- Lilac Grove Parkette
- Little Don Park

=== M–O ===
- Macleod's Landing Park
- Maplewood Park
- Mary Dawson Park
- Matthew Dinning Memorial Parkette
- Meander Park
- Melinda Clarke Parkette
- Mill Pond Park
- Minthorn Park
- Mitchell Pond
- Monticello Park
- Moraine Park
- Morgan Boyle Park
- Mount Pleasant Park
- Newberry Park
- Newkirk Park
- North Richvale Greenway
- North Shore Parkette
- Oak Ridges Lions Club Park
- Oak Ridges Meadow
- Ozark Park

=== P ===
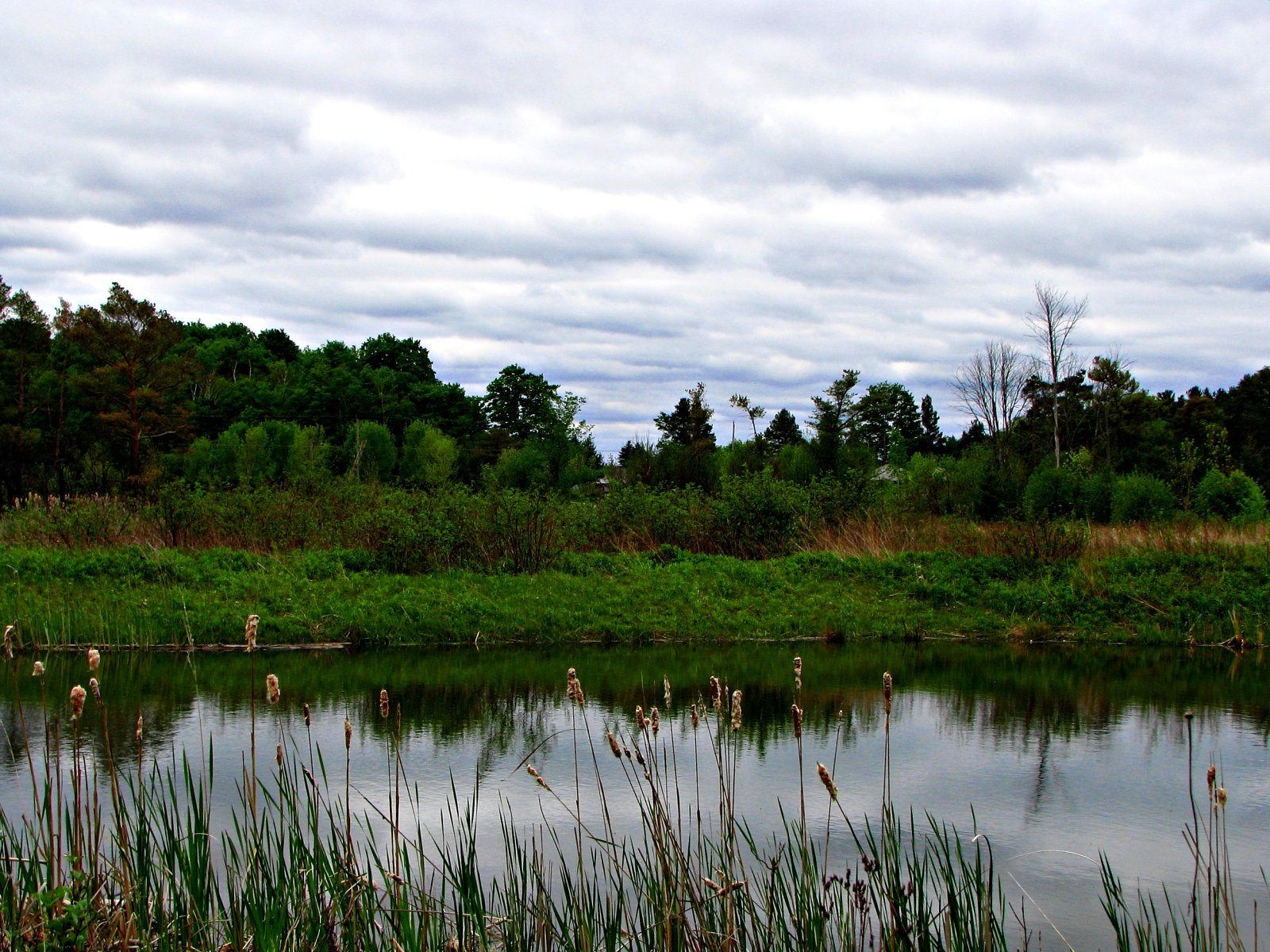
Pond at Phyllis Rawlinson Park

- Palmer Park
- Parker Park
- Patterson Parkette
- Penwick Park
- Philips Ridge Park
- Phillips Park
- Phyllis Rawlinson Park
- Pine Farm Park
- Pine Needle Park
- Pioneer Park
- Pleasantville Park
- Poplar Forest Parkette

=== R ===
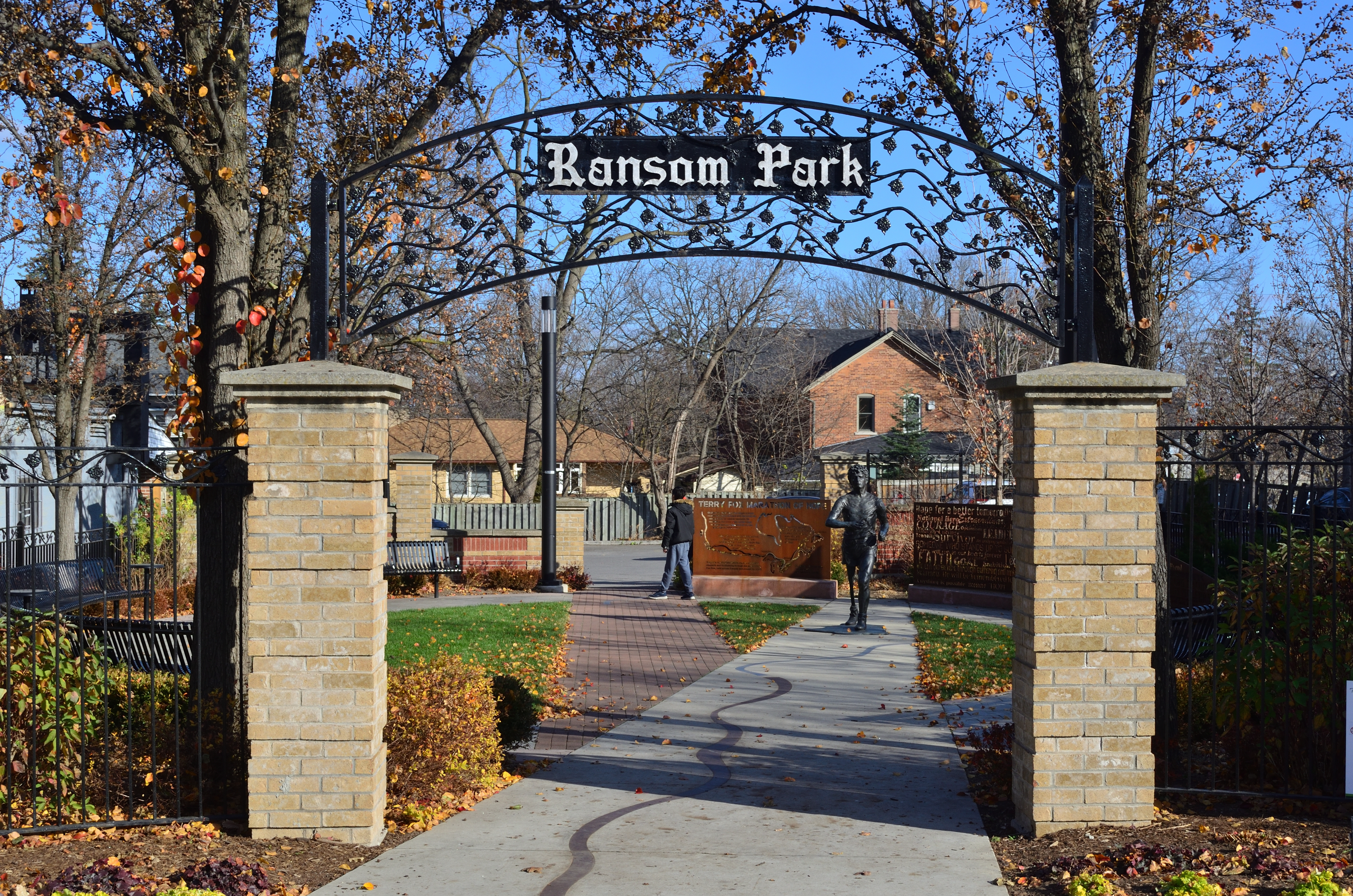
Ransom Park

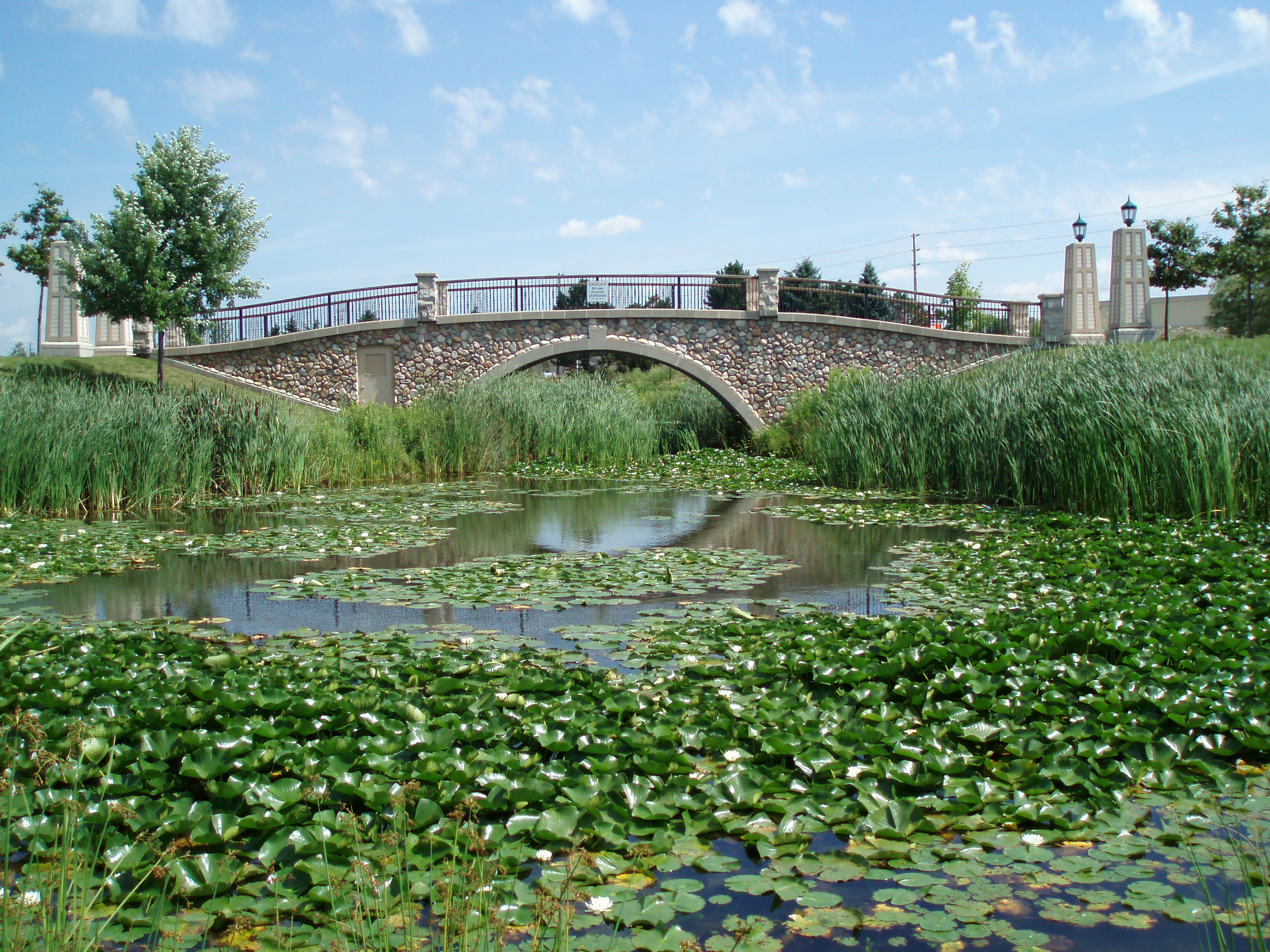
A footbridge spanning the pond at Richmond Green

- Raccoon Park
- Railway Parkette
- Ransom Parkette
- Red Maple Parkette
- Red Oak Parkette
- Redstone Park
- Richmond Green Sports Centre & Park
- Richvale Athletic Field
- Ritter Park
- Rocking Horse Ranch
- Rouge Crest Park
- Rumble Pond Park
- Russell Farm Park
- Russell Tilt Park

=== S ===
- Shaun Beggs Park
- Shaw Parkette
- Shelter Woods Parkette
- Silver Pines Parkette
- Silver Stream Park
- Skopit Park
- Snakes & Ladders Park
- Southview Park
- Spadina Parkette
- Springbrook Park
- Spruce Avenue Parkette
- Stavert Park
- Sussex Park
- Sweet Grass Hill Park

=== T–V ===
- Tadpole Parkette
- Tannery Park
- Temperanceville Park
- The Richmond Hill Rotary Club Park
- Timber Mill Park
- Toll Bar Park
- Town Park
- Tree House Parkette
- Twickenham Park
- Unity Park
- Vanderburgh Park

=== W–Z ===
- Walnut Grove Park
- Webster Park
- Weldrick Parkette
- Westview Parkette
- White Oak Parkette
- William Bond Park
- William H. Graham Parkette
- William Harrison Park
- William Neal Community Park
- Willow Grove Park
- Willow Hollow Park
- Winbourne Park
- Windham Parkette
- Wood's Park
- Woodside Parkette
- Worthington Parkette
- Wyldwood Gardens
