= Richmond Hill United Church =

Coordinates: 43.87612°N 79.43787°W

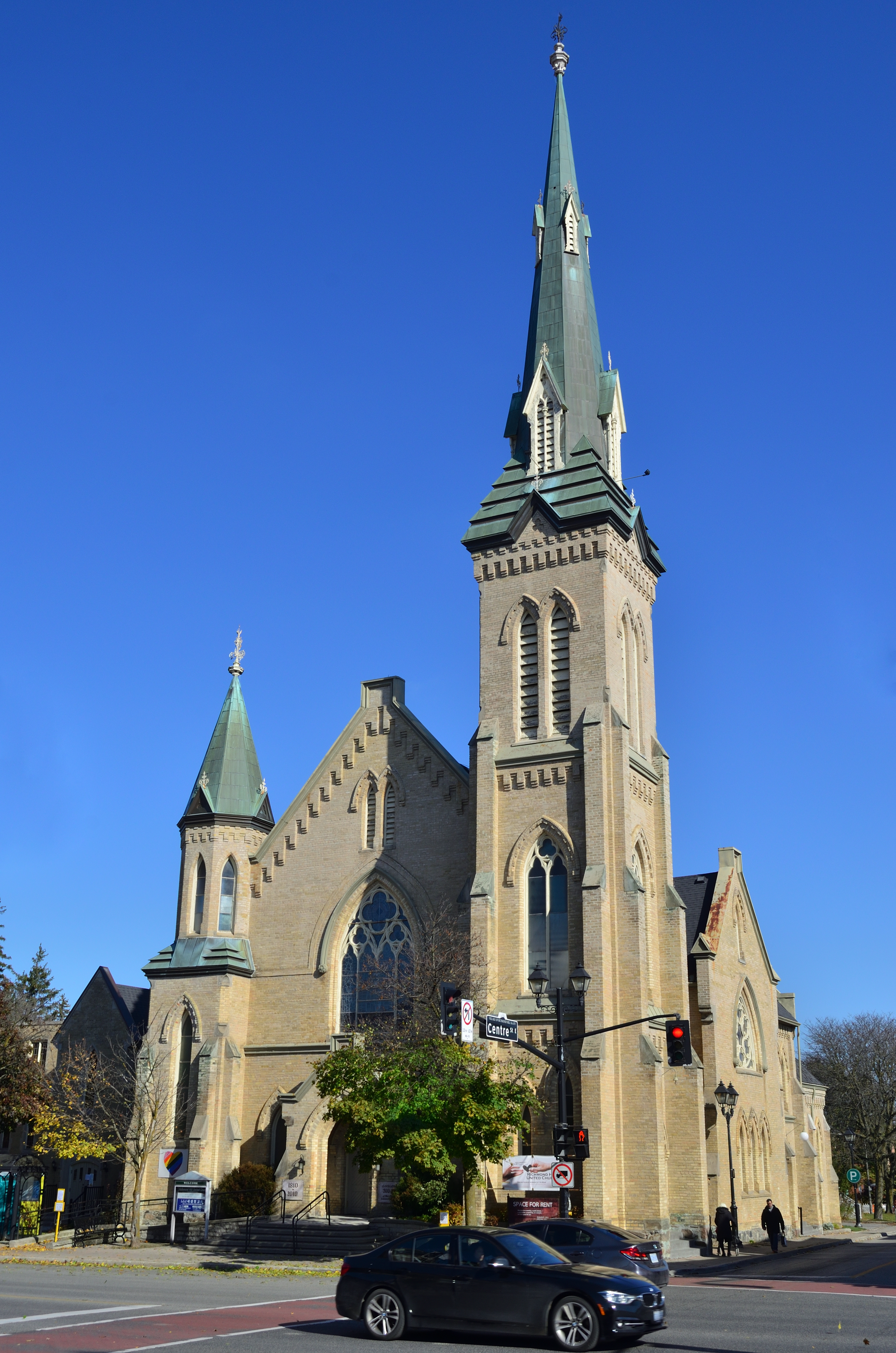
- Richmond Hill United Church
- Location: 10201 Yonge Street, Richmond Hill, Ontario.
- Country: Canada
- Denomination: United Church of Canada
- Previous denomination: Methodists, Congregationalists, and Presbyterians
- Website: http://richmondhilluc.ca

History
- Status: Cathedral

Architecture
- Functional status: Active
- Heritage designation: Heritage Building
- Architect: Charles Albert Walton
- Architectural type: Norman-Gothic

Administration
- Division: Toronto Conference

Richmond Hill United Church, at 10201 Yonge Street, is a designated heritage building in the town of Richmond Hill, Ontario, Canada. The main body of the building dates back to 1880, then as Richmond Hill Methodist Church, with later additions built in 1932 and in 1957 (Christian Education building). Originally the Methodist Church, it was renamed the United Church in 1925 when the Methodists, the Congregationalists, and the Presbyterians entered into a union.

The church is, and always was, first and foremost a place of worship. In its early days there is a possibility that, aside from general church related uses, it could also have served as a Sunday school. With time and with the extensions the functions expanded in range. The church began to gain recognition not only as a religious venue but also as an important community marker. This church has a strong social justice orientation, and became an affirming ministry in June 2013. Currently, the church has tenants that use parts of its space, which include a dance school, a drama group, ESL training, and a math enrichment program. Occasionally the building is also used as a place for committee meetings and as a gathering space for community groups concerning cultural, social, or other issues.

== History and architecture ==
The United Church boasts a history of over 200 years, where it began as a simple log schoolhouse that acted as a place of worship for the local Methodists. Later a frame building was constructed in 1847 as a replacement but this structure did not survive: in 1879 it burned down to the ground. Five months later, in 1880, work began on what was to be the last building.

The present church was designed by Charles Albert Walton (1845-1908), a Toronto architect. Construction was carried out for a year until the church was completed in 1881. In its time, the church cost $17,000 to be built, which was a very significant figure, and the property was purchased for $950 as a deed. During those times the church was large enough to accommodate everyone who lived in the area together.

The United Church was built in the High Victorian Gothic Revival style. This is heavily embodied through sharp edges and arches, stained glass windows, and, mostly, the two flanking steeples. Its front entrance is within a projecting exterior Gothic arch with side buttresses. A secondary entrance into the church is available on the south side of the main tower, which also has a datestone inscribed with “A.D. 1880” at its base. The southwest corner of the church features the prominent three-tier steeple that seems to be the defining element of the structure. This steeple is the tallest among all historic church steeples in the town of Richmond Hill.
