= Richmond Hill, Ontario =

Richmond Hill
- City (lower-tier)
- City of Richmond Hill
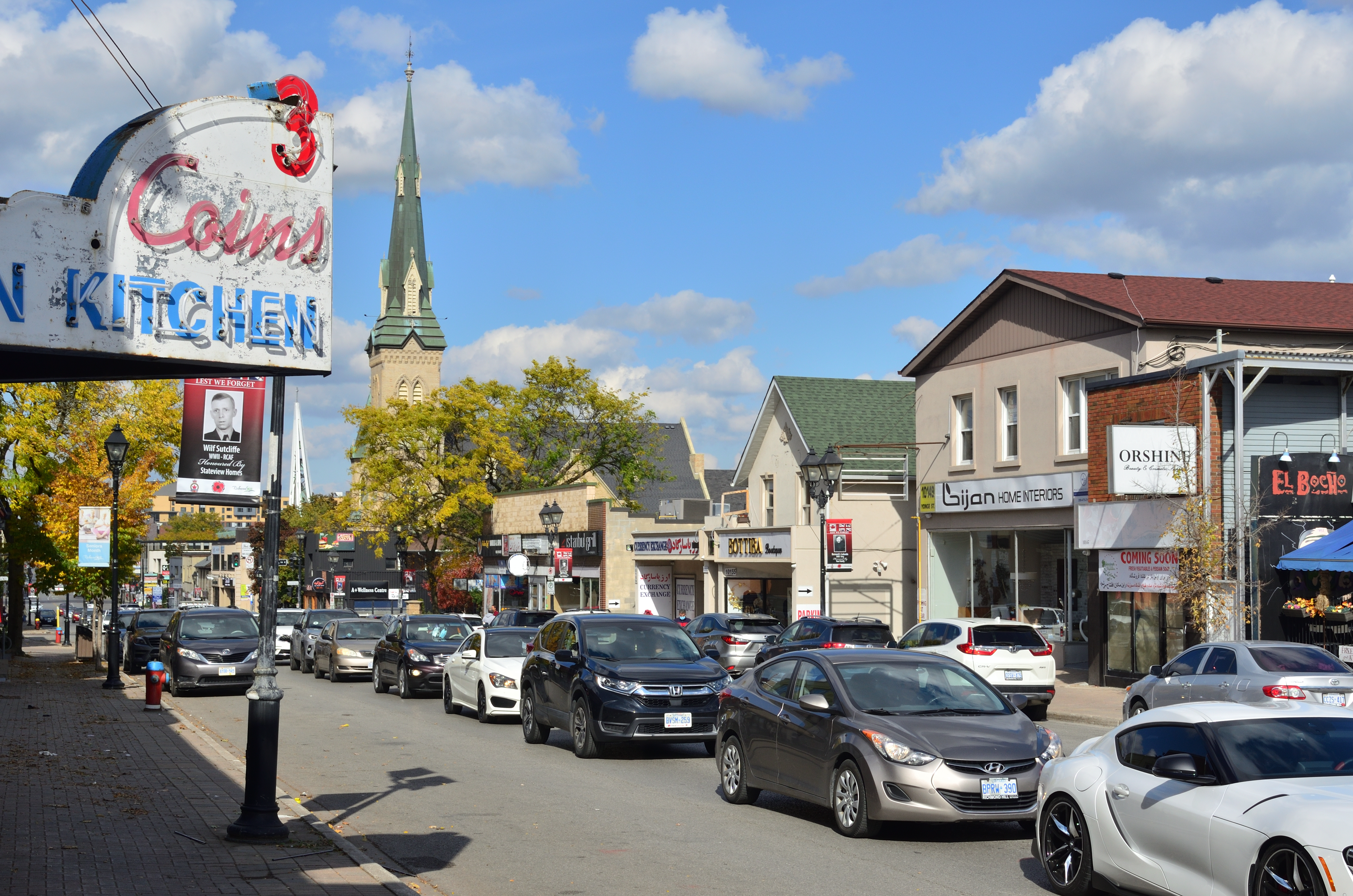
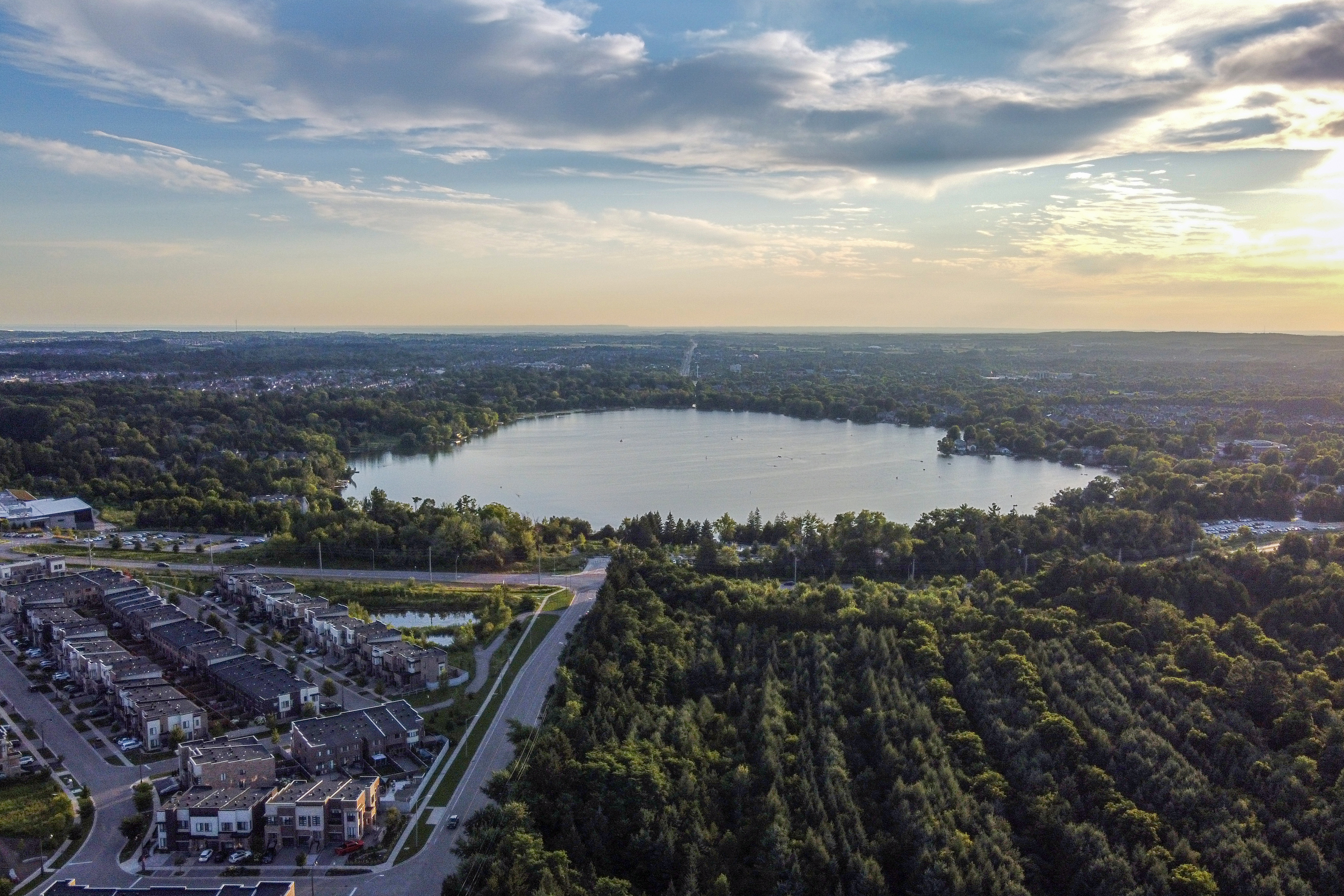
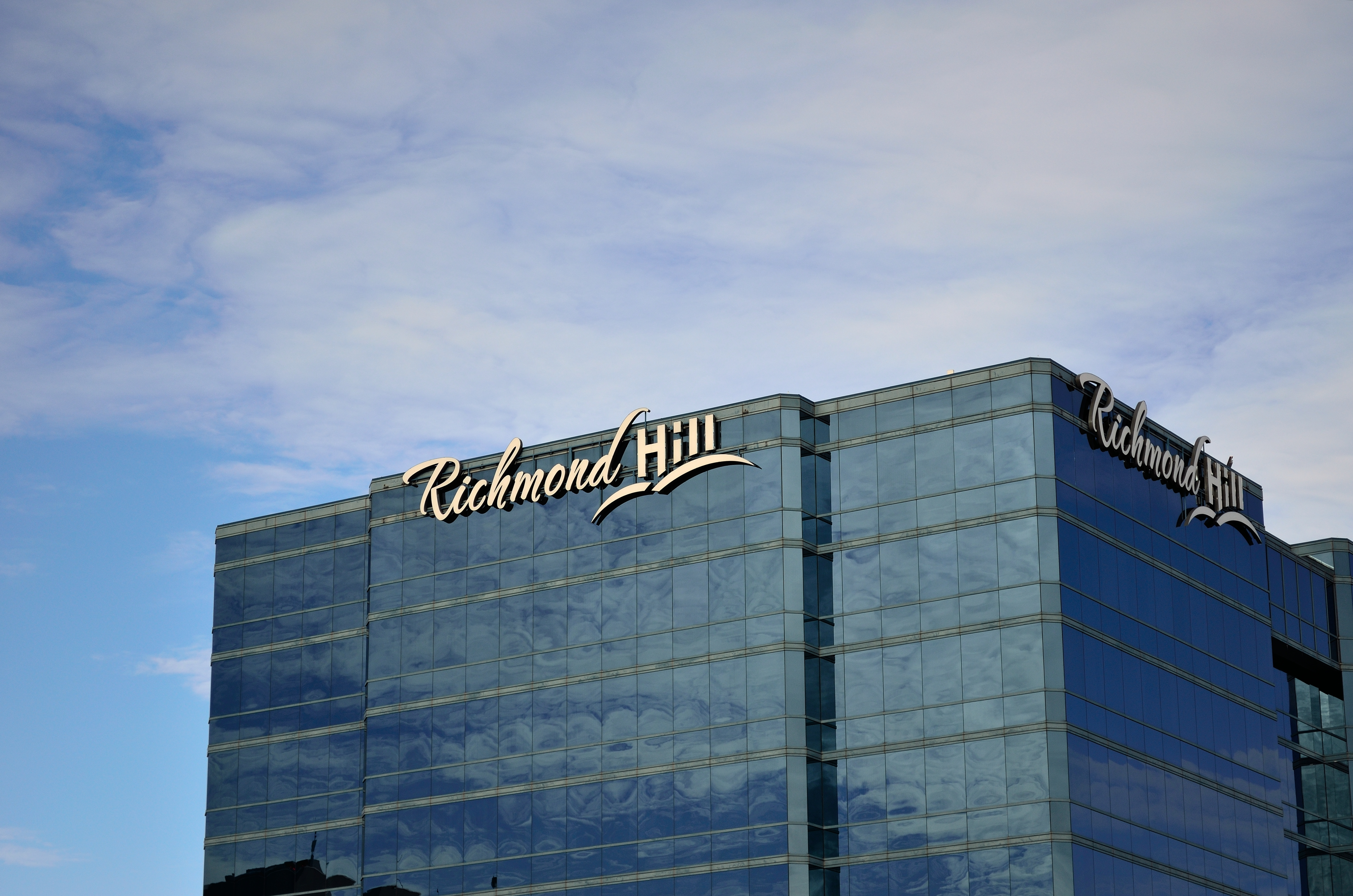
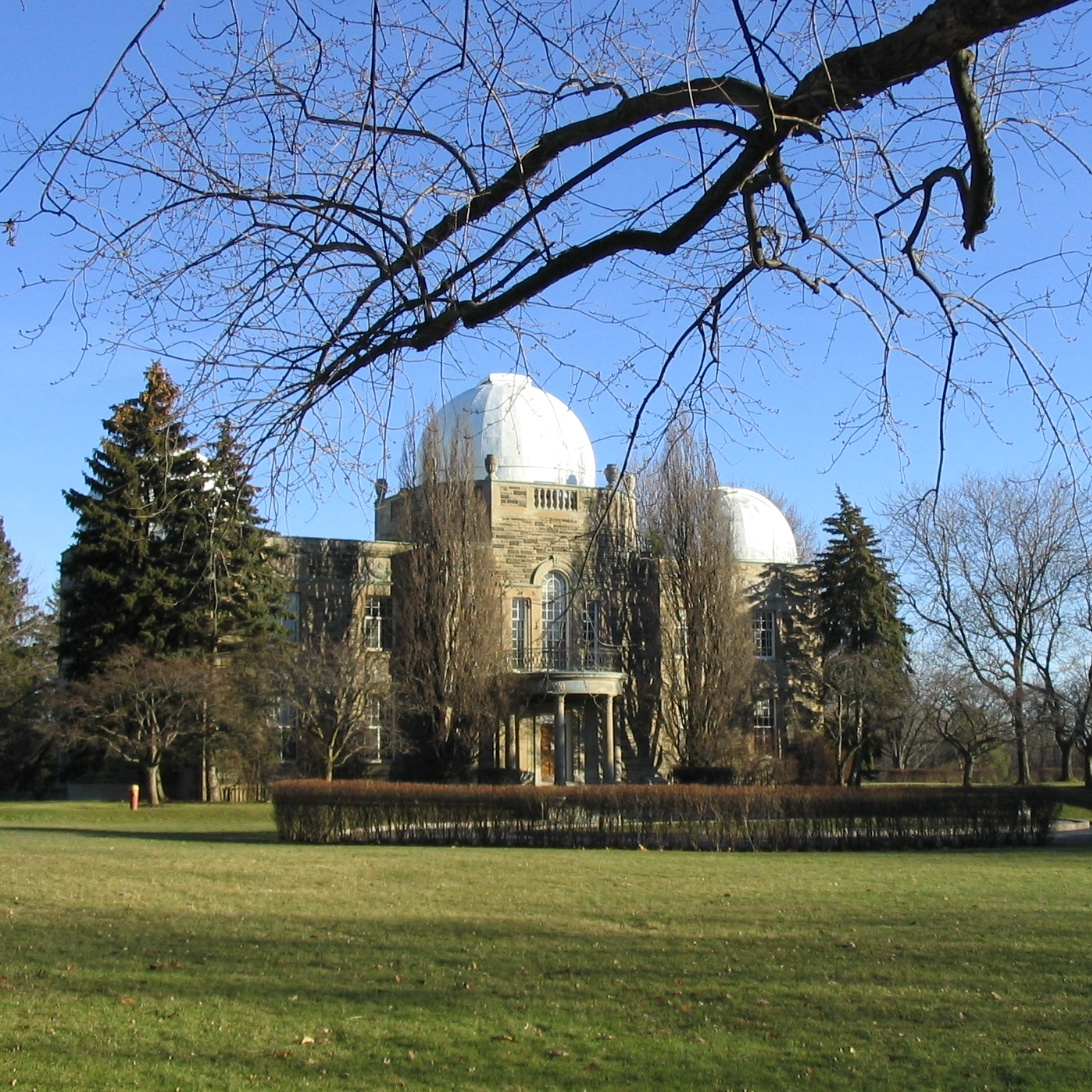
- Downtown Richmond Hill Lake Wilcox Richmond Hill Town Hall David Dunlap Observatory

- Flag Logo
- Mottoes: Official: En la rose, je fleuris (French for "Like the rose, I flourish"); Unofficial: A little north, a little nicer
- Location of Richmond Hill within York Region

- Location within Southern Ontario Location within Canada
- Coordinates: 43°52′29″N 79°26′22″Wdisplay=inline,title
- Country: Canada
- Province: Ontario
- Region: York
- Incorporated
  - Village: January 1, 1873
  - Town: January 1, 1957
  - City: March 25, 2019

Government
  - Mayor: David West
  - Councillors: Godwin Chan; Joe DiPaola
  - Governing body: Richmond Hill City Council
  - MPs: Vincent Ho (C); Costas Menegakis (C)
  - MPPs: Michael Parsa (PC); Daisy Wai (PC)

Area (2021)
  - Total: 100.79 km^{2} (38.92 sq mi)
- Elevation: 233 m (764 ft)

Population (2021)
  - Total: 202,022 (27th)
  - Density: 2,004.4/km^{2} (5,191/sq mi)
- Demonym: Richmond Hillian
- Time zone: UTC−05:00 (EST)
  - Summer (DST): UTC−04:00 (EDT)
- Forward sortation area: L4B to L4E, L4S
- Area codes: 905, 289, 365, and 742
- Website: www.richmondhill.ca

Richmond Hill (2021 population: 202,022) is a Ontario city in the south-central Regional Municipality of York, Canada. Part of the Greater Toronto Area, it is the twelfth most populous municipality in Ontario and the twenty-seventh most populous municipality in Canada. Richmond Hill is situated between the cities of Markham and Vaughan, north of Thornhill, and south of Aurora.

Richmond Hill has seen significant population growth since the 1990s. It became a city in 2019, after being a town since 1957. The city is home to the David Dunlap Observatory telescope, the largest in Canada.

== History ==
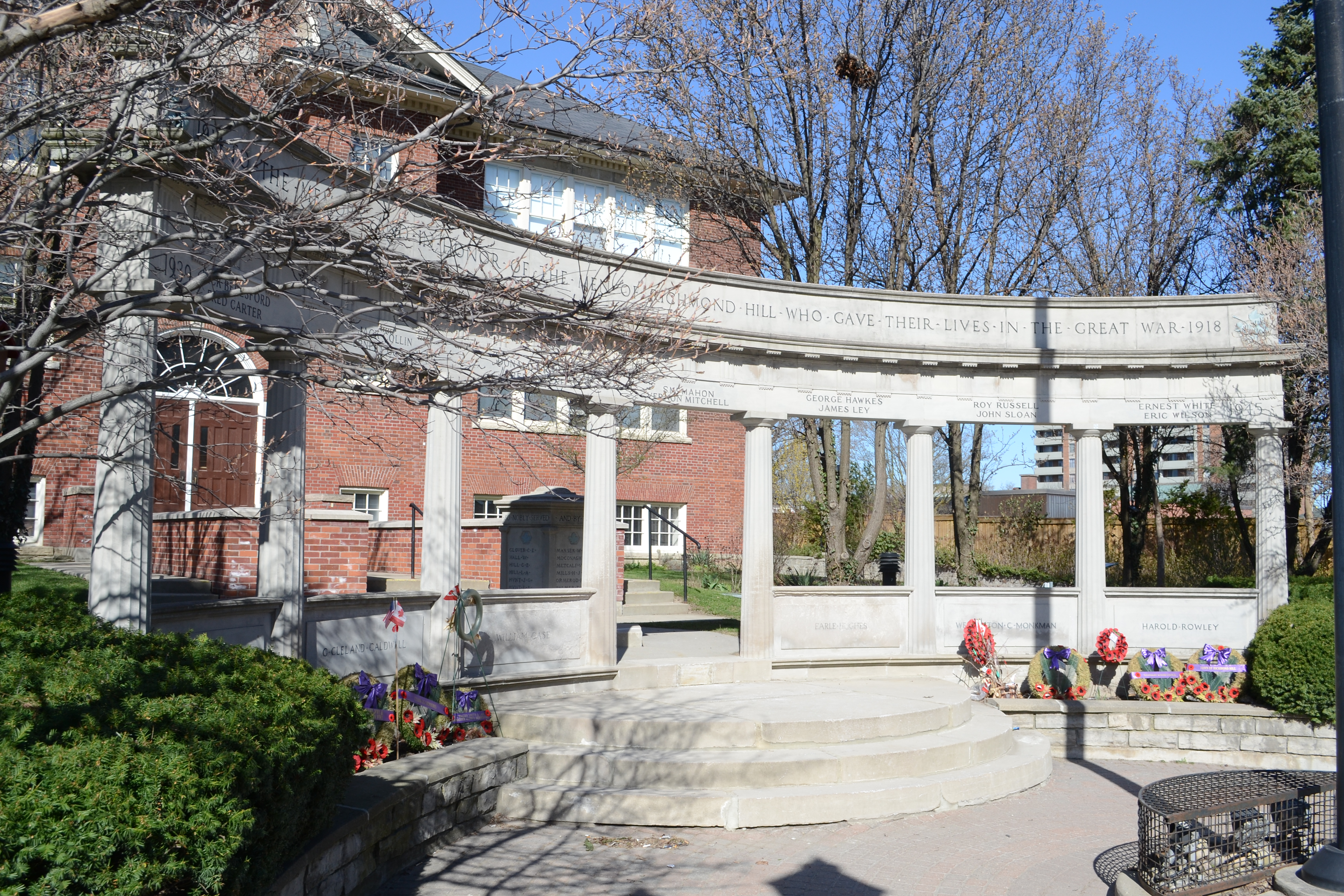
Cenotaph on Yonge Street

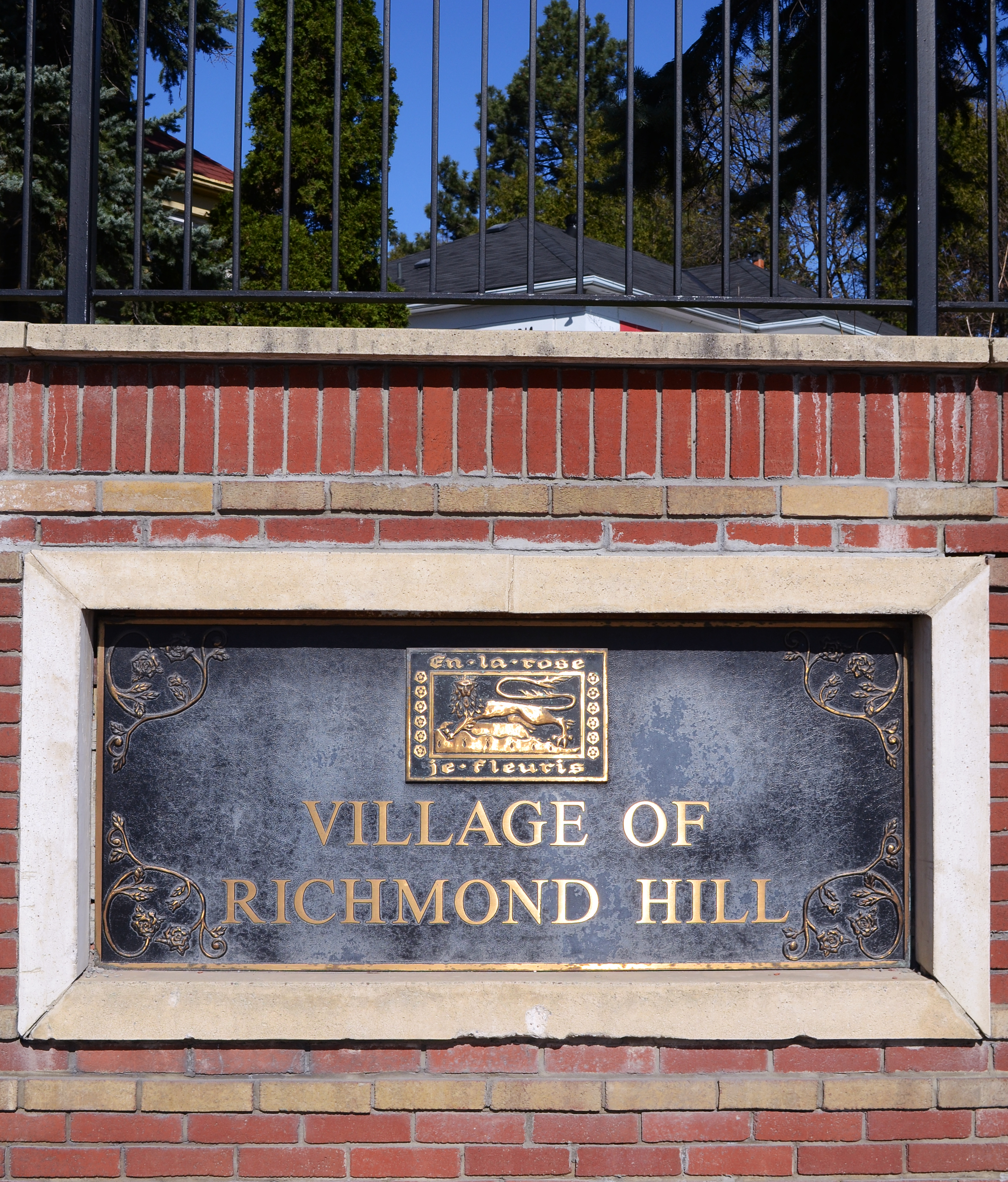
Village of Richmond Hill, with original logo

The village of Richmond Hill was incorporated by a by-law of the York County Council on June 18, 1872, coming into effect January 1, 1873. In September 1956, the Ontario Municipal Board approved its elevation to Town status, effective January 1, 1957.

The Regional Municipality of York was established by Bill 102 An Act to Establish the Regional Municipality of York of the provincial parliament, passed on June 26, 1970, and coming into force on January 1, 1971. The act expanded Richmond Hill's borders, annexing parts of Whitchurch Township, Markham Township, Vaughan Township and King Township into Richmond Hill, expanding the area covered from 1,700 acres (6.9 km^{2}) to 27,000 acres (110 km^{2}) and the population from a little over 19,000 to some 34,000. Historically the town was bounded along a narrow strip along Yonge Street from Lots 48 to 46 (about Crosby Avenue down to Major Mackenzie Drive), as far east as Church Street and slightly west of Mill Pond (excluding Lot 46 where it ended just north of Arnold Crescent or eastern end of today's Don Head Park). The town grew to encompass the communities of Gormley, Dollar, Langstaff, Carrville, Headford, Elgin Mills, Jefferson, Bond Lake, Temperanceville, Lake Wilcox, Oak Ridges and Richvale. While Richmond Hill was a prosperous, well developed town, many of the outlying areas annexed were far more rural, with dirt roads, no water mains or sewers and no streetlights, and the time needed to bring municipal services up in these areas, combined with residual unequal tax assessments caused considerable conflict in the municipal politics. Policing was taken over by the York Regional Police, but fire protection remained with Richmond Hill, whose firefighting force quickly grew. Having hired its first full-time employee in 1967, it had fourteen full-time employees by 1971.

Yonge Street through Richmond Hill expanded from two lanes to four in 1971, relieving congestion on what was known as "Ontario's worst stretch of highway".

The Richmond Hill Dynes Jewellers softball team was the 1972 Softball World Champions. The Royal Canadian Air Farce was recorded at the Curtain Club Theatre in Richmond Hill for its first 5 seasons on radio, beginning in 1973. The Air Farce returned for an anniversary recording in the 1990s. Also in 1973 was the centennial of the town's incorporation as a village, and the town set up a number of celebratory activities, including a beard growing contest, commissioning a centennial song, a parade, a street dance and the unveiling of a historic plaque honouring the town's founding in front of the municipal offices. June 27 was officially declared Russell Lynett Day, named after the town's clerk, only the third in its existence. 1973 also saw the sale of the last of the original rose-growing greenhouses in Richmond Hill. Development had led to increasing property taxes and the H.J. Mills greenhouses relocated to Bayview Avenue and Elgin Mill Road. The site of the greenhouses was developed as a subdivision. The fast-growing town set aside significant areas for parks, with five new parks dedicated in 1973, and two more in 1974. The Richmond Hill Historical Society was founded in 1973. The society was dedicated to preserving the history of Richmond Hill and raising awareness of the town's history. Their first action was to restore a 150-year-old house, known as the Burr House.

As the 1970s went on, the population growth of Richmond Hill remained large. In 1976, home prices in Richmond Hill were among the highest in Canada. By this time, the town council was split over whether to keep expanding rapidly. The deadlock over a fifty-five house subdivision named Springmills Estate led to one councillor saying that it was not the reform council it was dubbed, but a "deformed council". Other housing projects faced similar problems as councillors debated many things, including the need for affordable housing and the encroachment of homes into the farmland and the Oak Ridges Moraine.

GO train service was extended to Richmond Hill in 1978, officially opened on April 29, 1978, by Bill Davis.

Growth in Richmond Hill slowed towards the end of the 1970s, with M.L. McConaghy Public School closing in 1979 due to dropping enrolment. At the same time, Richmond Hill began to make official plans for future land development. The first official plan concerned a 700-acre (2.8 km^{2}) industrial park at Leslie Street and Highway 7 named Beaver Creek. A commercial area within the park spread into the hamlet of Dollar. The plan was rejected, however, by the Ontario Municipal Board, and Richmond Hill was the first municipality in Ontario to have its official plan rejected outright by the board. The whole affair was subject to much controversy in the community, although the town council eventually declined to appeal the decision.

When the new council convened in 1980, led by new mayor Al Duffy, the town remained without a development plan. The council hired civic planner Peter Walker to produce a new official plan. By September 1981, the new plan was drafted, with limited development of northern Richmond Hill, industrial development centred in the south-east part of town and commercial centres remaining along Yonge Street. The plan was approved in July 1982 by the Ontario Municipal Board.

A clash over the use of the land in Langstaff, known as the Langstaff Jail Farm erupted in 1982 between Richmond Hill and Toronto, which owned the land. The 632-acre (2.56 km^{2}) plot of land had been acquired by Toronto in 1911, and was unused in 1982. Toronto's plans for development clashed with those of Richmond Hill over the balance of industry and residential development, with Richmond Hill favouring more industrial development.

The rose business left Richmond Hill in June 1982, with the closure of H.J. Mills florists. Mills died in 1980, leaving the company to his son, but the poor economic conditions, combined with increasing property taxes in the growing city made the business unprofitable. A 1984 contest organized by The Liberal had readers submit entries for a new town slogan. The town council chose three of the submissions which residents then voted on, and "A little north, a little nicer" became Richmond Hill's new town slogan.

Richmond Hill's growth continued during the 1990s, fuelled in significant part by immigration, with many businesses opened on Highway 7 around Leslie Street serving the new Chinese Community that formed there. In the early 1990s, Statistics Canada named Richmond Hill as Canada's fastest-growing community.

On March 25, 2019, the Richmond Hill Council passed a motion to change the title of Richmond Hill from 'town' to 'city'.

== Politics ==
The city's motto is En la rose, je fleuris (French for "Like the rose, I flourish"), reflecting either the motto of the Duke of Richmond, or the fact that the city was a centre of rose-growing in the early 20th century. At that time, it was known as the "Rose Capital" of Canada. A more recent motto for Richmond Hill is A little north, a little nicer.

Richmond Hill is the only municipal Canadian government to have light pollution laws in place, due to the presence of the David Dunlap Observatory.

In June 2013, the city's council passed a by-law to ban the number 4 from new street numbers because it is considered to be bad luck in some East Asian cultures.

=== Governance ===
The city is governed by the Richmond Hill City Council, which operates on a Mayor-Council system with six Ward Councillors and two Regional Councillors, plus the Mayor. The council serves a four-year term, after which a new council is elected by qualified electors in Richmond Hill.

The council derives its authority primarily from the Municipal Act and the amendments of the Municipal Law Amendment Act, 2006. Richmond Hill is a Lower-tier municipality and has the roles and responsibilities of that position. The municipality has a wide purview relating to the interests of the municipality and its residents to develop and maintain policies, practices and procedures through the issuing of by-laws relating to highways, transportation systems apart from highways, waste management, public utilities, culture, parks, recreation and heritage, drainage and flood control, parking, animals, economic development and the licensing of business. The city is also responsible for maintaining its finances in order to provide relevant services and for maintaining an official plan to guide development.

=== Elections ===
Elections for municipal offices are held every four years in conjunction with other municipal elections in Ontario. Elected positions include mayor, regional and local councillors and ward councillors (for six different wards) on the Richmond Hill City Council, as well as trustees for the York Region District School Board, the York Catholic District School Board and for Conseilleres (school trustees) for the Conseil scolaire de district du Centre-Sud-Ouest and Conseil scolaire de district catholique Centre-Sud. The mayor and regional and local councillors also serve on York Regional Council.

== Culture ==
=== Arts ===
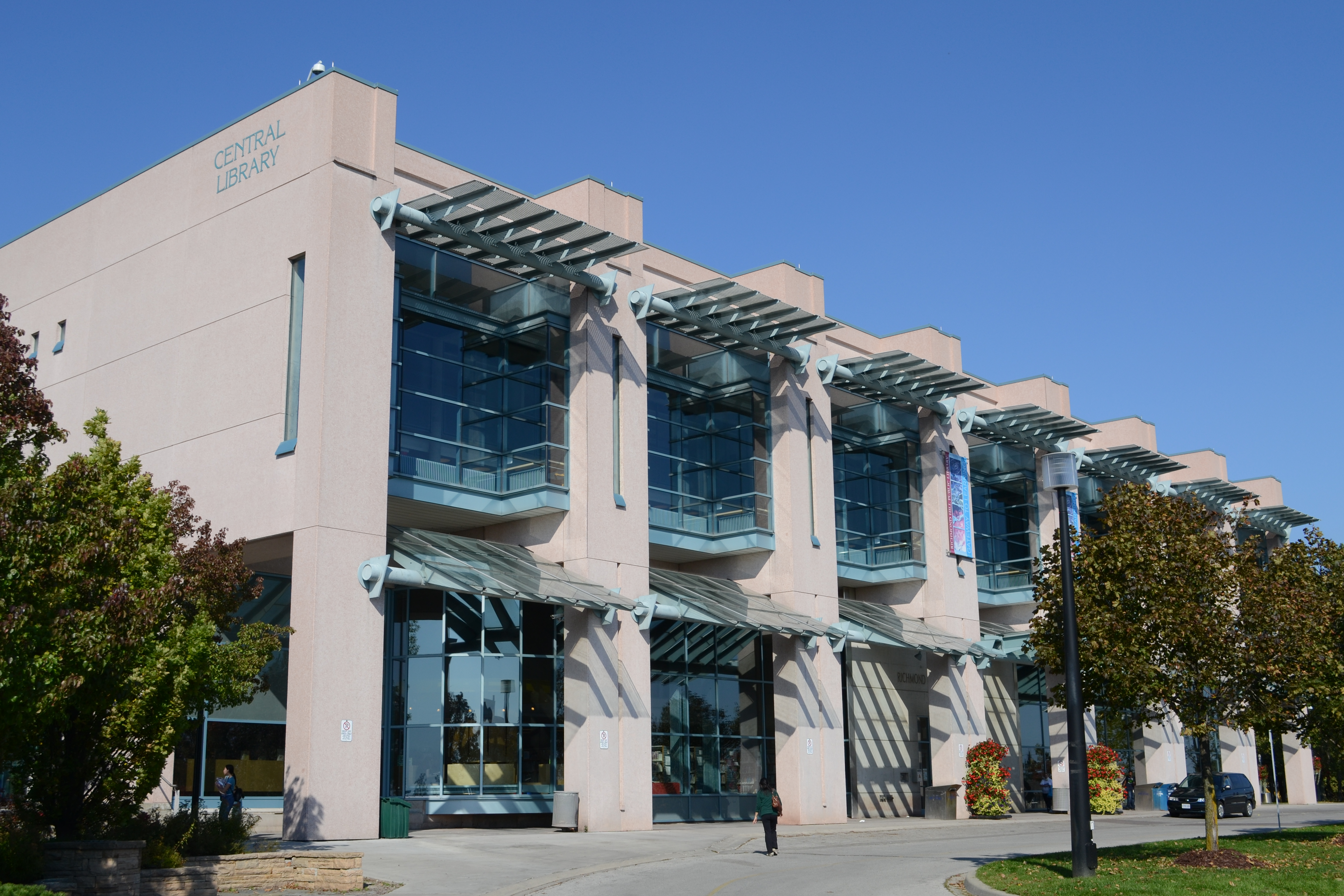
The Central Library, one of four branches of the Richmond Hill Public Library located in Richmond Hill

The Richmond Hill Public Library system has four library branches.

The Richmond Hill Centre for the Performing Arts offers theatre productions, concerts, comedy, and other shows in a multi-purpose space that includes a 631-seat auditorium. The Richmond Hill Philharmonic Orchestra, founded in 2008, offers a variety of concerts throughout the year at the Richmond Hill Centre for the Performing Arts.

Housed in a restored cottage from the 1840s, the Richmond Hill Heritage Centre offers an exhibit of local history and has a number of educational programs.

=== Recreation ===
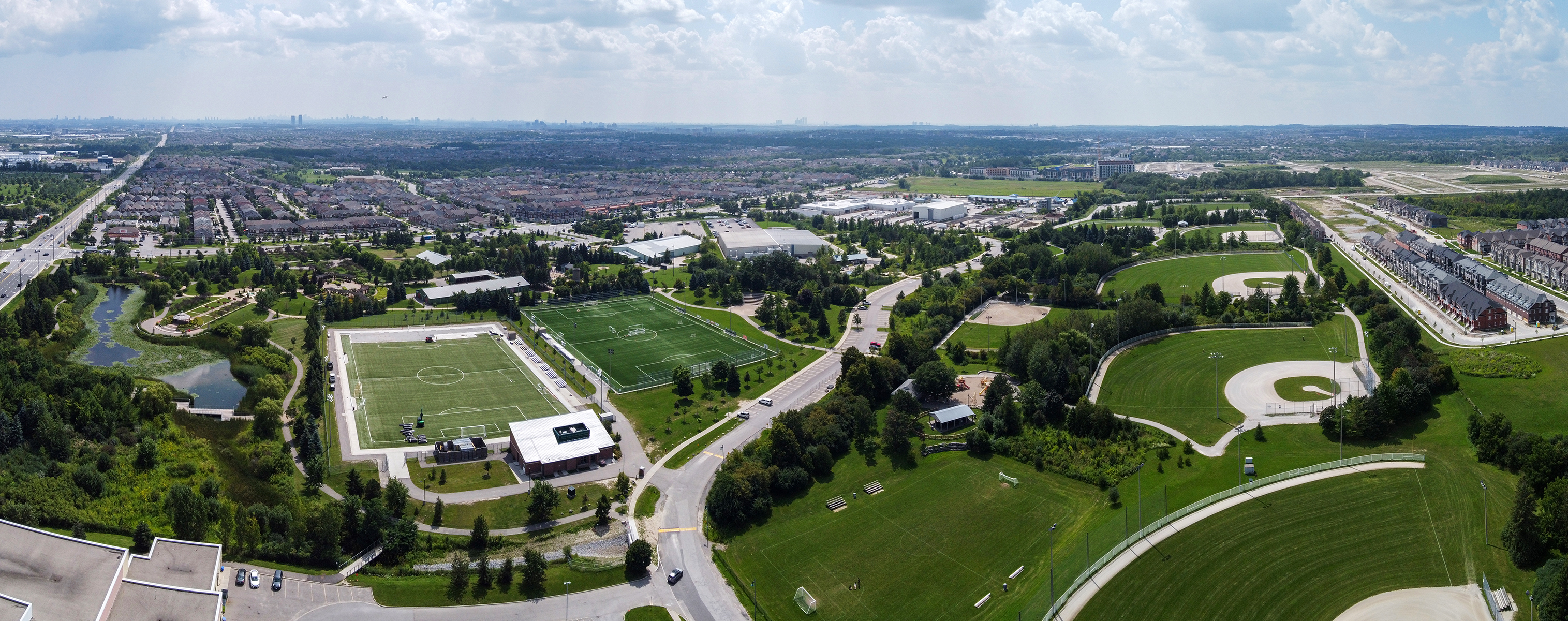
Richmond Green is the largest park in this city

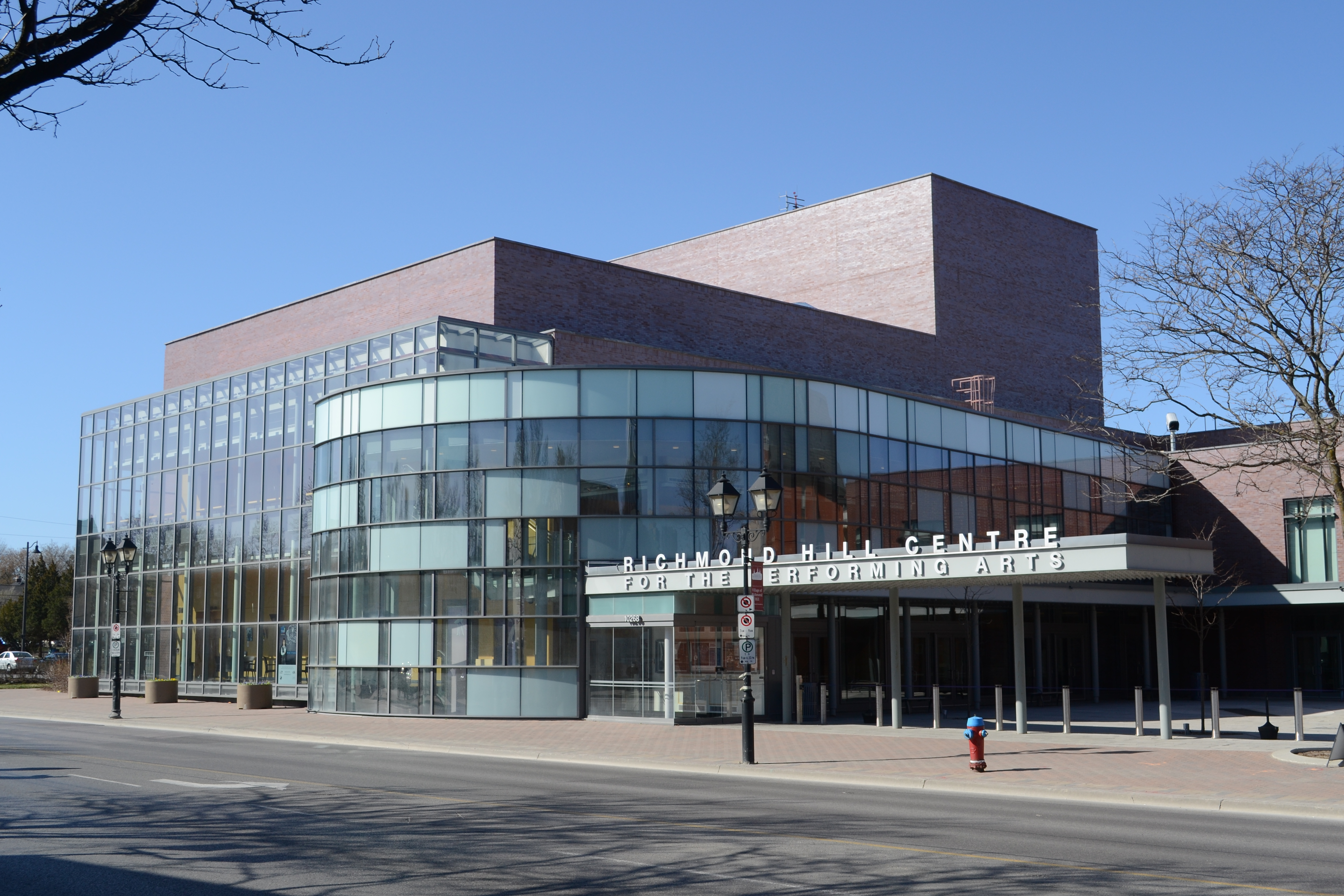
Richmond Hill Centre for the Performing Arts

Richmond Hill has 167 parks, of which most are small urban parks, and 689 ha (1,700 acres) of undeveloped natural area for recreation. The largest such park is Richmond Green Sports Centre and Park which includes several baseball diamonds, two ice skating rinks, a 300-person amphitheatre and a skateboard park.

The city also has a total of six public swimming pools, including an indoor wave pool. Each summer, the city features a concert series entitled "Concerts in the Park", each having a specific theme, such as children's music and "The Beach Boys" and are held at Mill Pond Park, with some Sunday concerts at Richmond Green Park.

The city is also home to the Richmond Hill Country Club, Summit Golf and Country Club, and the Bloomington Downs Golf Course.

Richmond Hill was awarded the National Communities in Bloom award in 2003, with a special mention about the city's floral displays.

In September 2009, Alias Grace Park was opened to honour Margaret Atwood's novel's depiction of the city in Upper Canada prior to John A. Macdonald becoming prime minister.

==== Sport clubs ====
- Richmond Hill Curling Club
- Richmond Hill Soccer Club

== Demographics ==
Historical populations
Year	Pop.	±%
1877	659	—
1911	652	−1.1%
1921	1,055	+61.8%
1931	1,295	+22.7%
1953	3,300	+154.8%
1971	33,030	+900.9%
1976	35,376	+7.1%
1981	38,685	+9.4%
1986	46,766	+20.9%
1991	80,142	+71.4%
1996	101,725	+26.9%
2001	132,030	+29.8%
2006	162,704	+23.2%
2011	185,541	+14.0%
2016	195,022	+5.1%
2021	202,022	+3.6%

In the 2021 Census of Population conducted by Statistics Canada, Richmond Hill had a population of 202,022 living in 69,314 of its 72,017 total private dwellings, a change of 3.6% from its 2016 population of 195,022. With a land area of 100.79 km^{2} (38.92 sq mi), it had a population density of 2,004.4/km^{2} (5,191.3/sq mi) in 2021. Richmond Hill has a sizeable Chinese community as well as a sizeable Iranian community.

The median age as of 2021 was 43.6, slightly higher than the Ontario median age of 41.6.

=== Language ===
According to 2021 Census data, English is the mother tongue of 33.8% of the residents of Richmond Hill. Native speakers of Mandarin consist of 12.8% the city's population, closely trailed by those of Persian (11.6%) and Cantonese (11.3%). Following are Russian (4.3%), Italian (2.6%), and Korean (2.3%).

=== Religion ===
As of 2021, most reported religion among the population was Christianity (40.0%), with Catholicism (18.8%) making up the largest denomination. This was followed by Islam (13.0%), Judaism (4.3%), Hinduism (2.5%), Buddhism (2.2%) and Sikhism (0.3%). 37.3% of the population did not identify with a particular religion.

=== Ethnicity ===
Ethnic Origin (2021)	Population	Per cent
Chinese	57,305	28.5
Iranian	20,345 (Note: 7,390 identified as Persian (3.7%))	10.1
Italian	16,125	8.0
Canadian	9,005	4.5
East Indian	8,880	4.4
Russian	8,295	4.1
English	8,120	4.0
Irish	6,580	3.3
Korean	6,265	3.1
Polish	6,120	3.1
Scottish	6,065	3.0
Jewish	6,030	3.0
Hong Konger	5,010	2.5
Ukrainian	4,080	2.0
Filipino	4,075	2.0

In 2021, Visible minorities made up 66.4% of the population.

Panethnic groups in the City of Richmond Hill (2001−2021)
Panethnic group	2021		2016		2011		2006		2001	
Panethnic group	Pop.	%	Pop.	%	Pop.	%	Pop.	%	Pop.	%
East Asian (Note: Statistic includes total responses of "Chinese", "Korean", and "Japanese" under visible minority section on census.)	70,900	35.29%	62,980	32.5%	49,545	26.87%	39,205	24.25%	30,700	23.33%
European (Note: Statistic includes all persons that did not make up part of a visible minority or an indigenous identity.)	66,955	33.32%	77,075	39.77%	86,505	46.92%	87,495	54.11%	78,125	59.37%
Middle Eastern (Note: Statistic includes total responses of "West Asian" and "Arab" under visible minority section on census.)	29,670	14.77%	23,745	12.25%	18,935	10.27%	13,050	8.07%	6,355	4.83%
South Asian	15,340	7.63%	14,970	7.72%	15,015	8.14%	11,320	7%	8,180	6.22%
Southeast Asian (Note: Statistic includes total responses of "Filipino" and "Southeast Asian" under visible minority section on census.)	5,260	2.62%	5,255	2.71%	5,460	2.96%	3,660	2.26%	2,475	1.88%
African	4,540	2.26%	3,875	2%	3,720	2.02%	3,455	2.14%	2,650	2.01%
Latin American	2,425	1.21%	1,645	0.85%	1,730	0.94%	1,235	0.76%	735	0.56%
Indigenous	510	0.25%	510	0.26%	395	0.21%	315	0.19%	285	0.22%
Other/Multiracial (Note: Statistic includes total responses of "Visible minority, n.i.e." and "Multiple visible minorities" under visible minority section on census.)	5,325	2.65%	3,760	1.94%	3,065	1.66%	1,955	1.21%	2,090	1.59%
Total responses	200,925	99.46%	193,800	99.37%	184,365	99.37%	161,695	99.38%	131,595	99.67%
Total population	202,022	100%	195,022	100%	185,541	100%	162,704	100%	132,030	100%
Note: Totals greater than 100% due to multiple origin responses

== Economy ==
Industries of employment, from the 2001 Census
Industry	People employed
Agriculture and other resource-based industries	820
Manufacturing and construction industries	12,200
Wholesale and retail trade	13,995
Finance and real estate	7,990
Health and education	9,960
Business services	16,925
Other services	9,850

The employment rate of the city is 66.36% with the most prevalent occupations being in the business, finance and administration and management sectors. The 2006 Census showed that the unemployment rate is very low at 3.77%, compared with the 7.4% unemployment rate across Canada during the time of the Census.

The 1990s and 2000s were periods of strong economic growth for Richmond Hill; In 1999 industrial, commercial and institutional growth was valued at $88.9 million, up from $67.9 million in 1998. The economic growth of 1999 won the city's economic development department three provincial awards from the Economic Developers Council of Ontario. The border between Richmond Hill and Markham is a rapidly growing area for information technology and high-tech industry with over 1,000 such businesses located along their border in 2000.

Most businesses in Richmond Hill are small businesses, with more than half of all employers in the city having four workers or less. The city is home to the corporate headquarters of Acklands Grainger Inc., Compugen Inc., Compuware, DMC Mining Services, Lexmark, Rogers Communications, BMW Canada, Science & Medicine Canada, Mister Transmission and Staples.

Largest employers in Richmond Hill, 2007
Employer	Mackenzie Richmond Hill Hospital	Apotex	Town of Richmond Hill	Rogers Cable	Quebecor World	Staples
Employees	995	730	600	500	350	350

== Education ==
The York Region District School Board operates 27 public elementary schools in Richmond Hill, as well as 5 secondary schools: Alexander Mackenzie High School, Bayview Secondary School, Langstaff Secondary School, Richmond Green Secondary School and Richmond Hill High School. Students in schools in the York Region District School Board have scored above the provincial average on the Assessment of Reading, Writing and Mathematics, Primary Division (Grades 1–3) and Junior Division (Grades 4–6) since their introduction in 2002. The board's students in academic math streams have performed above the provincial average on the Grade 9 Assessment of Mathematics every year since its inception in 2002, while those in applied math streams were below the provincial average in 2002–2005, and above the provincial average from 2005 to 2007.

The York Catholic District School Board operates 13 Catholic elementary schools in Richmond Hill. It also operates two Catholic secondary schools, St. Theresa of Lisieux Catholic High School and Our Lady Queen of the World Catholic Academy.

There are also many private schools located in Richmond Hill, including Laureates Academy for Gifted Students, Holy Trinity School, Richmond Hill Christian Academy, Discovery Academy, Toronto Montessori Schools, and Richmond Hill Montessori & Private Elementary School.

Post-secondary education services are provided to the residents of Richmond Hill by several post-secondary educational institutions in Toronto, some of which have satellite campuses in nearby communities.

Former Governor General Michaëlle Jean was a guest at the opening ceremony of a school named after her, in 2008, the Michaëlle Jean Public School.

== Communities ==
- Carrville
- Dollar
- Gormley
- Richvale
- Lake Wilcox
- Langstaff
- Temperanceville

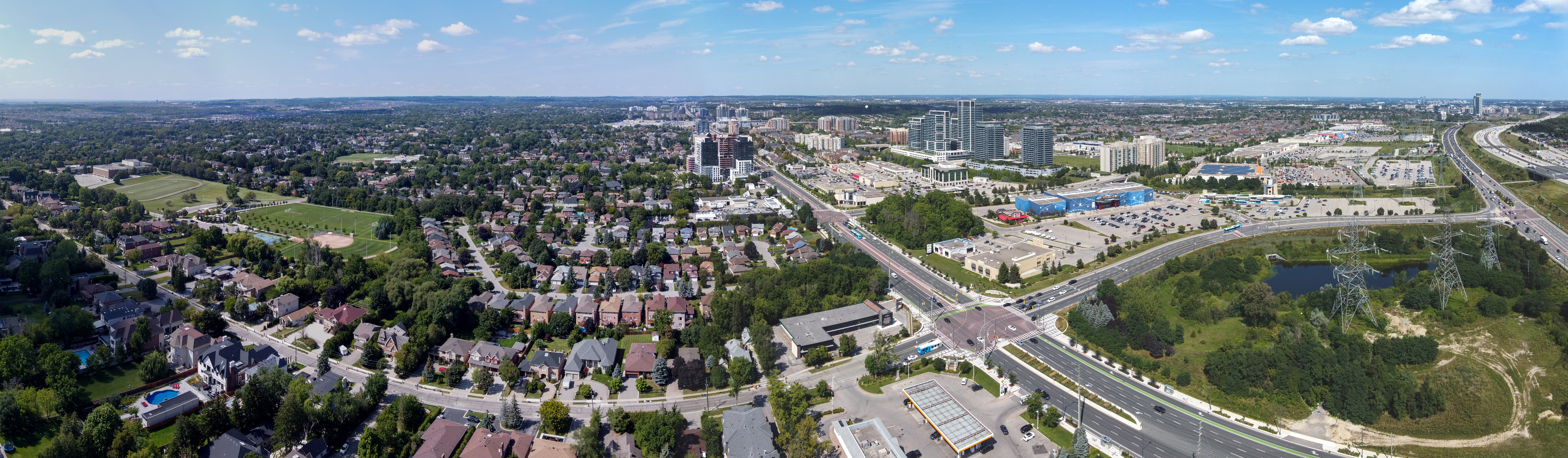
Richmond Hill looking north from Langstaff

=== Other neighbourhoods ===
==== Oak Ridges ====
Oak Ridges is an unincorporated community to the north of Richmond Hill's downtown and south of Aurora.

Historically, it had a post office from 1851 to the 1930s.

Oak Ridges was annexed by Richmond Hill in 1971. It is largely residential, with most commercial development located along Yonge Street. The city developed around Lake Wilcox, the largest lake in the area and a community within Oak Ridges, and has continued to expand slowly since its annexation. In the 1990s, Oak Ridges experienced moderate growth, which has spurred environmental action and anti-development movements by numerous organizations. Population has grown significantly as a result of development initiatives along Bayview Avenue. The Oak Ridges Community Centre was built and completed in June 2012 to accommodate community demand.

==== Bayview North ====
Bayview North is a residential area along Bayview Avenue from Elgin Mills Road East to Major Mackenzie Drive. Western branch of the Rouge River runs through as well as Beaver Creek. Bayview Secondary School is located within Bayview North.

==== Doncrest ====
Doncrest is a small residential area along and east of Yonge Street just north of Highway 7. The area is located on crest of the Don River tributary German Mills Creek. Chinese businesses located along Highway 7 from Bayview Avenue are located here and ties with those around East Beaver Creek area.

==== Elgin Mills ====
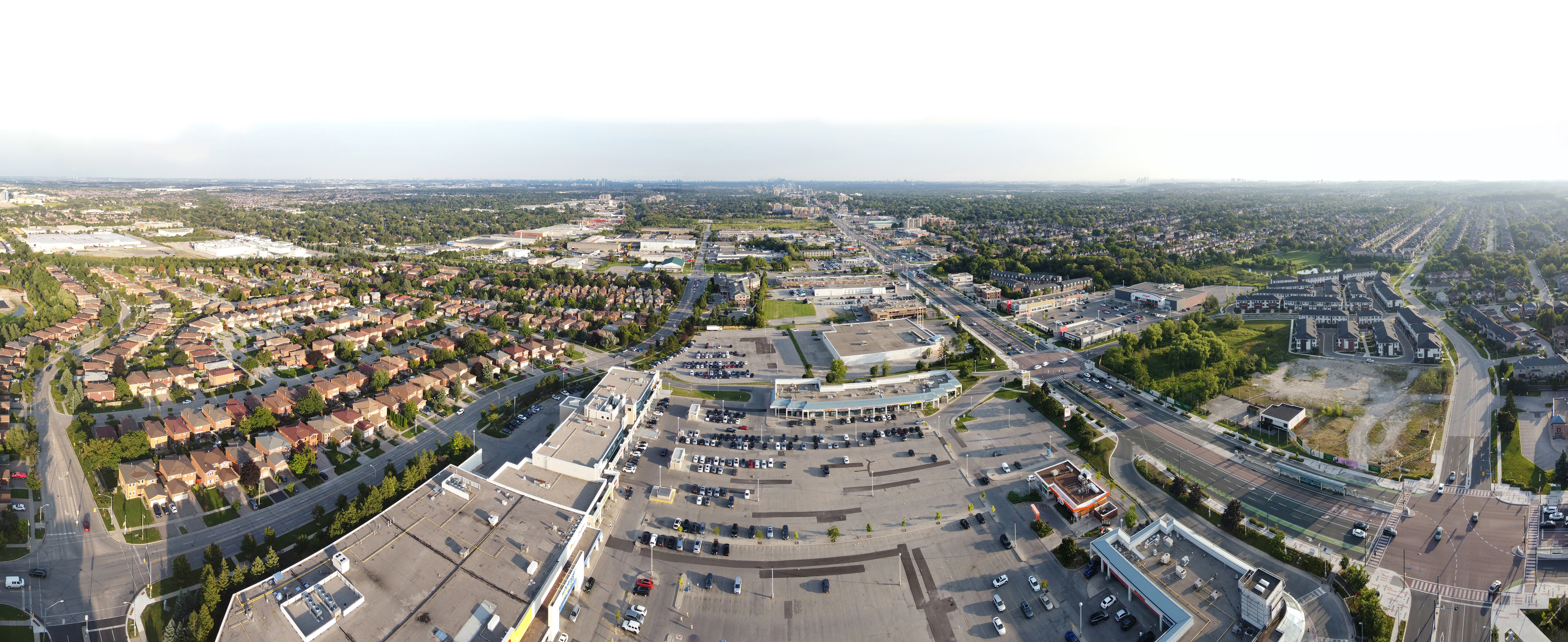
Elgin Mills in 2023

Elgin Mills is an area around Yonge Street from Gamble Road to Elgin Mills Road. A business park, Elgin Mills Business Park is located in the southeast. Overall a residential area served by Upper Canada Place and Elgin Mills Square at Yonge and Elgin Mills Road. Yonge-Bernard Terminal is a York Region Transit hub.

The historic community once had a steam grist mill, toll booth and inn at the corners of Elgin Mills Road and Yonge Street. The community existing prior to the establishment of a post office in 1900 and home to Newton Tannery before 1870 but business dwindled and reverted in the late 20th century as a residential suburb of Richmond Hill.

==== Headford ====
Headford was established as a postal village in 1856 and home to a Methodist Church that opened in 1850. A brief oil fever in the 1860s but the area declined by the early 20th century. Headford once had saw (F. Eckhardt farm) and grist (John Burr farm) mills along Beaver Creek. Headford is now mainly a business park area bounded by Major Mackenzie Drive, Leslie Street, Highway 404 and 16th Avenue.

==== Hillsview ====
Hillsview is home to David Dunlap Observatory with residential homes now surrounding the observatory where it once were farms.

Beverley Acres is a smaller residential area within Hillsville at southwest corner of Yonge Street and Major Mackenzie Drive.

==== Mill Pond ====
Mill Pond is a park located in the mid-region of Richmond Hill that is surrounded by heritage homes. The pond once powered a sawmill located here in the 1800s.

==== Richvale ====
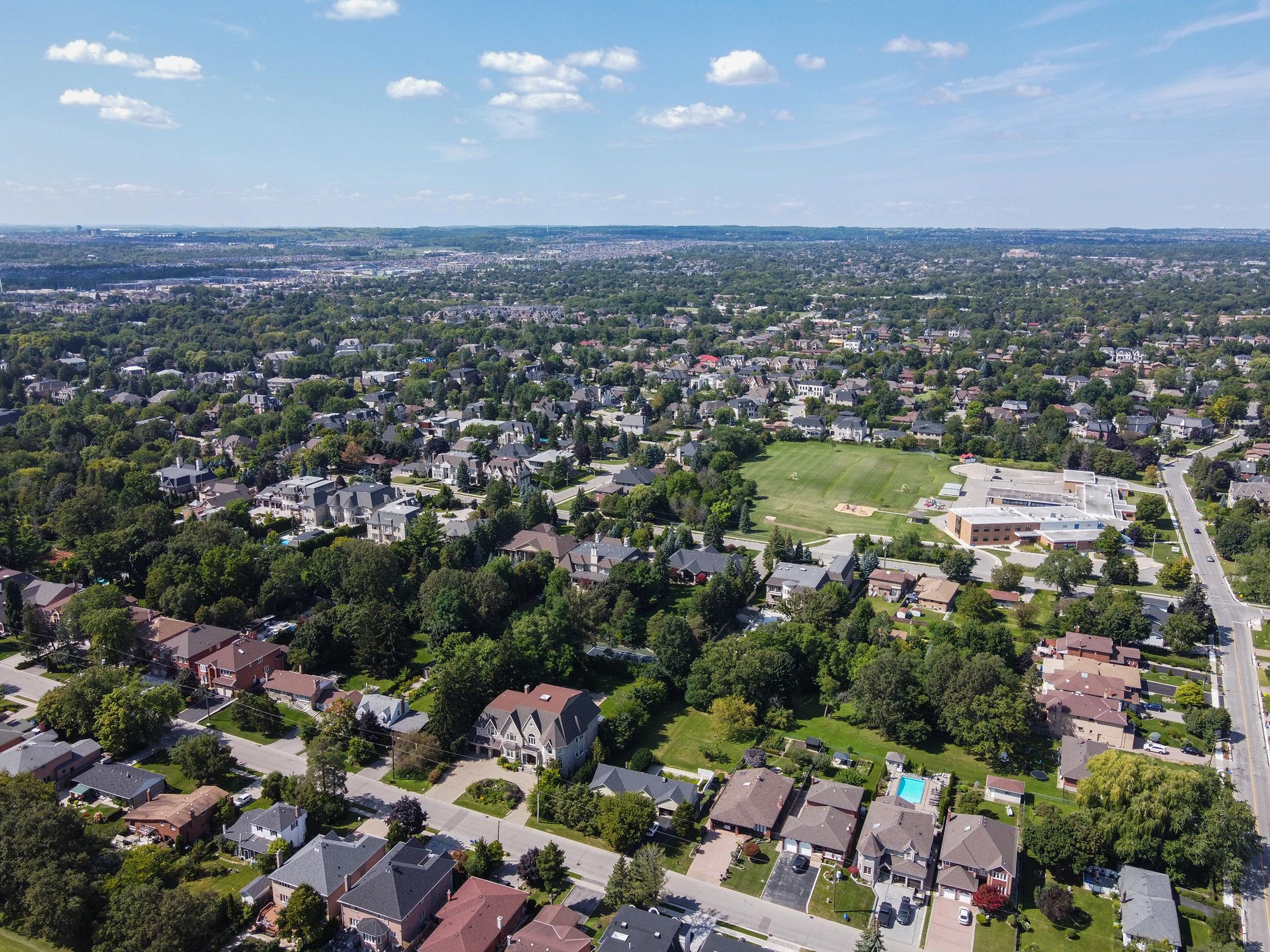
Richvale South in 2023

Richvale is two residential areas in the southwest end of Richmond Hill divided by Carrville Road and bounded by Yonge Street and Bathurst Street:

- North Richvale-Yongehurst - area north of Carrville Road
- South Richvale - area south of Carrville Road

Hillcrest Mall is the main commercial hub of the communities. Richmond Hill Golf Club is located in the south end.

Historically the area had several saw mills next to ponds along the Don River but now have disappeared and filled in.

==== Yonge Street ====
The old downtown Richmond Hill (also known as the historic Village of Richmond Hill) is considered the strip of Yonge Street between Major Mackenzie in the south and Richmond Heights in the north.

The new theatre was opened in 2009 and provides a modern venue for live performances.

==== Bayview Hill ====
Bayview Hill is a subdivision located on the northeast side of Bayview Avenue and 16th Avenue. Built in the early 1990s, the subdivision contains large expansive homes.

==== East Beaver Creek (Beaver Creek) ====
Richmond Hill's current commercial hub is located near Leslie Street and Highway 7, where it borders Markham's AMD headquarters. Built in the early to mid-1990s, the area is serviced by Highway 404. The current City Hall was moved to that location in 1994.

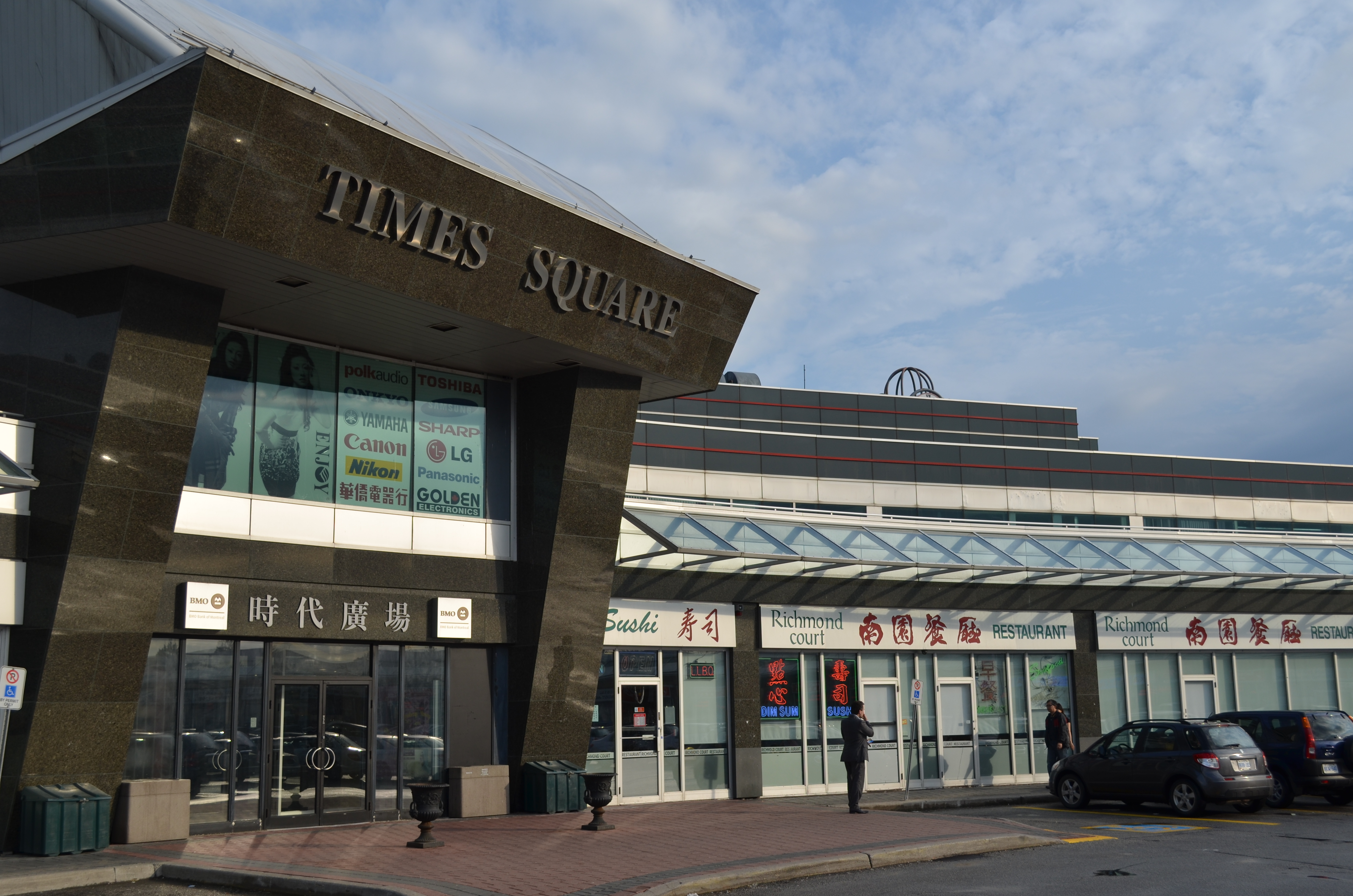
Times Square

Southern Richmond Hill is home to the city's industrial and business region housing most of the city's hotels, as well as the main commercial area of the city's Chinese community. The northern part of city is considered to be Old Richmond Hill as it is a historical area. Central Richmond Hill is a very commercial area, housing multiple malls, plazas and entertainment buildings, such as theatres and restaurants. The northernmost part of the city is mostly farm land, though it is slowly being developed.

During the 1990s, Chinese immigrants primarily from Hong Kong moved to Richmond Hill, where they set up businesses and shops catering to the community. Many shops and restaurants were established in suburban-style shopping malls and plazas, such as Times Square, along a stretch of Highway 7 between Bayview Avenue and Leslie Street.

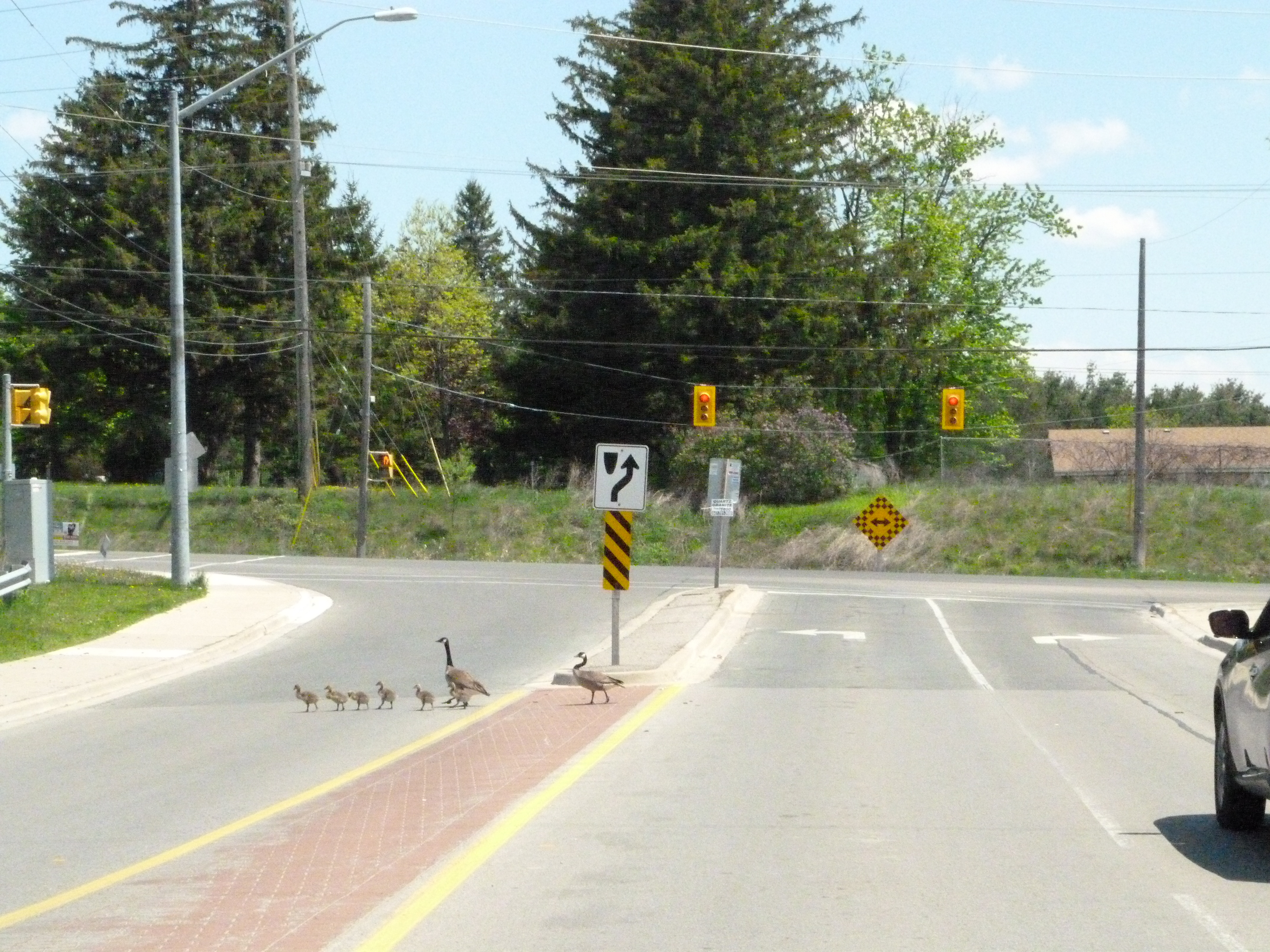
Family of geese crossing Jefferson Side Road

==== Jefferson ====
Historic Jefferson is named for Jonathan Jefferson who settled in Lot 59 and established a store and post office in 1840.

Jefferson is a newly developed neighbourhood, with housing begin to occupy in 2007. Jefferson Side Road is a major thoroughfare in the neighbourhood. Jefferson includes a large area, roughly bounded by Gamble Road in the south, Bathurst Street in the west and Bayview Avenue in the east. The community includes a residential subdivision namely Jefferson Forest, located in the southeast portion of the community.

Tower Hill is a smaller area in the south end of Jefferson and served by Tower Hill Road.

==== Windham ====
Windham was an early settlement along Yonge Street north of Elgin Mills to Jefferson Side Road.

Named for the British Secretary of War William Windham, the area was settled in 1798–1799 by French emigres These royalists, led by Joseph-Geneviève, Comte de Puisaye did not stay long and many would end up leaving the area. By 1814 most of these settlers had left.

Henri Quetton de St. George, French-born son of Laurent Quetton St. George (1771–1821), whom acquired land here in 1798, built his estate, Glen Lonely (burned down 1908), around 1847 and is now part of Lake St. George Conservation Area. St. George's family either died or left Canada for France and was the only member to remain in the area. He died in 1896 and is buried at Temperanceville United Church.

The Windham name would disappear after 1860s as Jefferson and Oak Ridges succeeded as new settlements. French Royalist Park in Jefferson is the only reminder of the French settlers.

== Transportation ==
=== Road networks ===
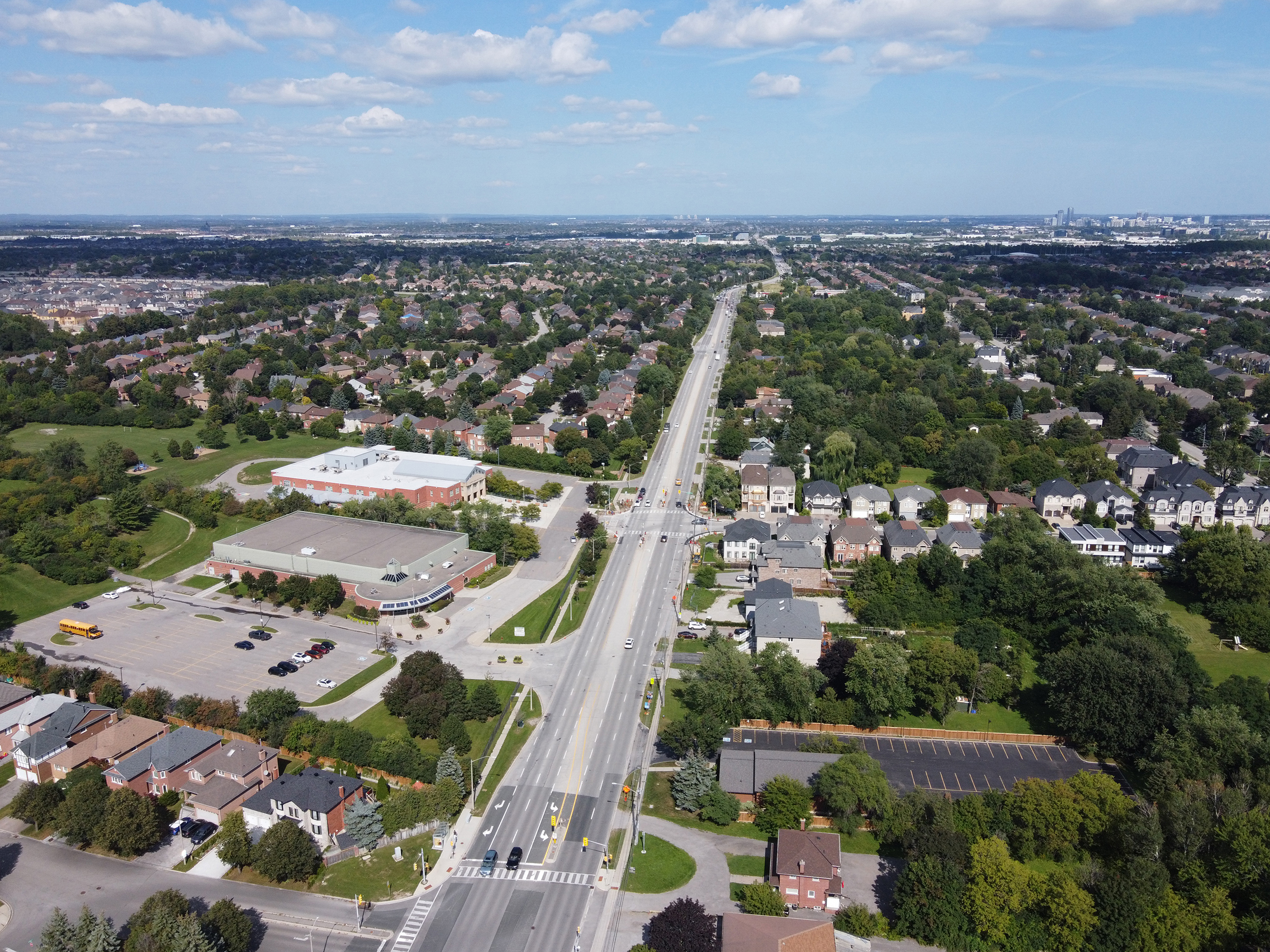
16th Avenue in Richmond Hill

The city of Richmond Hill is well serviced in terms of transportation facilities for a community of its size. The eastern border of the city is Highway 404, a major highway that leads directly into the core of the City of Toronto via the Don Valley Parkway (DVP). Highway 404 also intersects with Highway 401 in North York, which is one of the most traversed highways on the planet and is the principal east–west route in the Greater Toronto Area (GTA). The city's southern border is defined by the former Highway 7 and a parallel toll expressway, Highway 407. The latter is a toll route and was designed as a bypass for the 401. The combined effect of these highways ensures that Richmond Hill is well integrated into Ontario's road network and has easy access for all road vehicles. The ease of accessing the city is threatened by increasing traffic due to growth in the region, as the resulting commutes diminish the usefulness of the road network.

=== Public transit ===
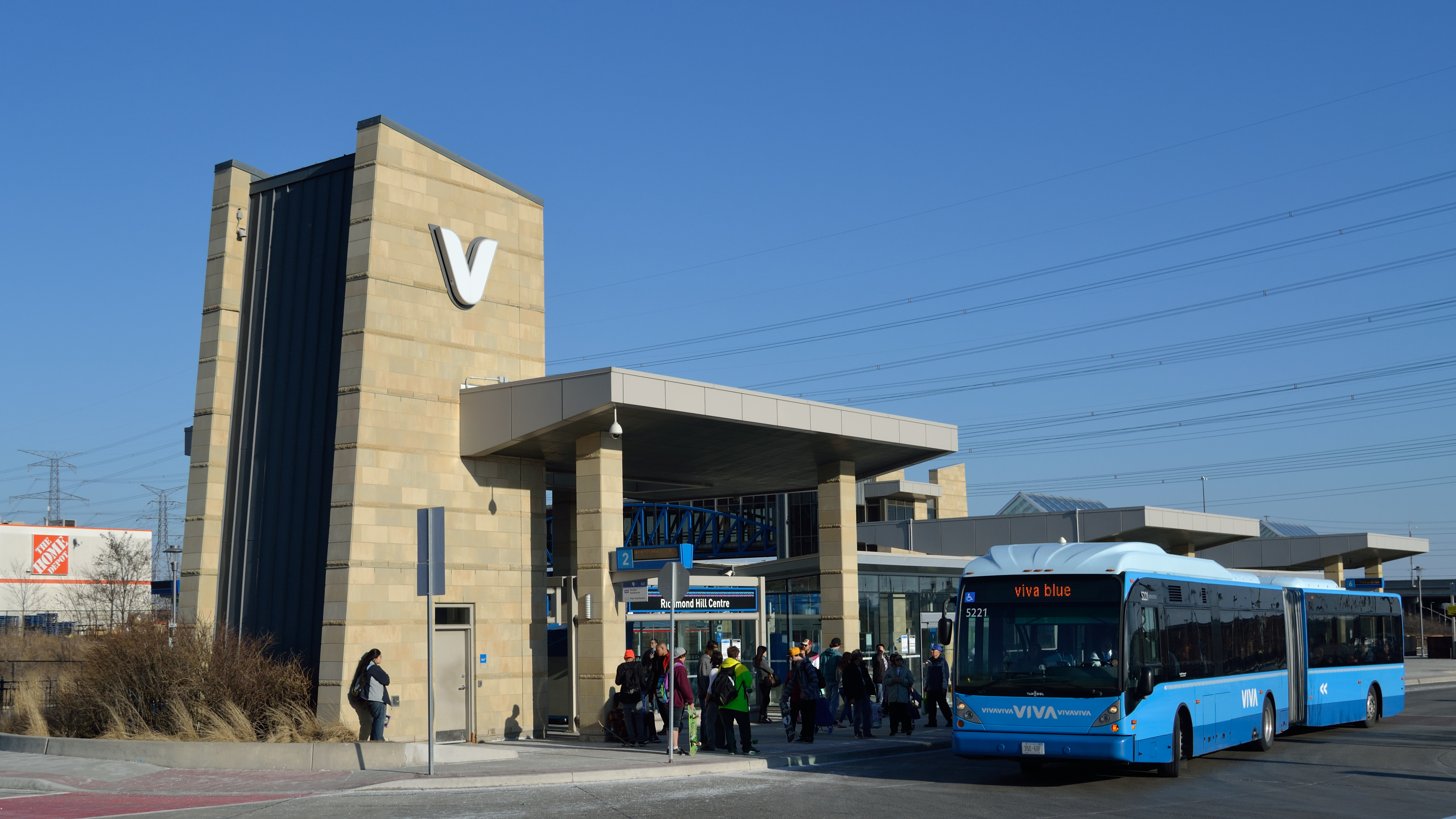
Richmond Hill Centre Terminal

Public transit within the city of Richmond Hill is on buses co-ordinated by York Region Transit (YRT). In September 2005, YRT unveiled a new rapid transit initiative entitled VIVA which provides enhanced bus service on major routes using vehicles capable of speeding up traffic lights to lessen the time they idle. Viva Blue, Viva Purple, Viva Orange, and Viva Pink have stops in Richmond Hill. In addition, YRT operates several feeder routes on secondary streets in the city.

Commuter train service is provided to the city by GO Transit on the Richmond Hill line with four stations in the city, Bloomington Station, Gormley Station, Richmond Hill Station and Langstaff Station. Langstaff Station is near the new Richmond Hill Centre Terminal of York Region Transit at Highway 7 and Yonge Street, and is connected to it by a pedestrian bridge opened in March 2008. The Richmond Hill Centre Terminal is complete with enclosed heating areas, payphones, and credit card/debit card ticket purchasing machines.

Owing to its proximity to Toronto, there are plans to extend Line 1 Yonge-University of the TTC subway system to the intersection of Yonge and Highway 7. The project is in its preliminary planning, design and engineering (PDE) phase, with funding from the federal and provincial governments.

=== Other transportation ===
Richmond Hill is minimally serviced by other modes of transportation. Its landlocked situation inhibits any water transportation. There are no registered aerodromes in city limits, although Lake Wilcox does see occasional float plane traffic. The closest international airport is Pearson International Airport.

== Geography and climate ==
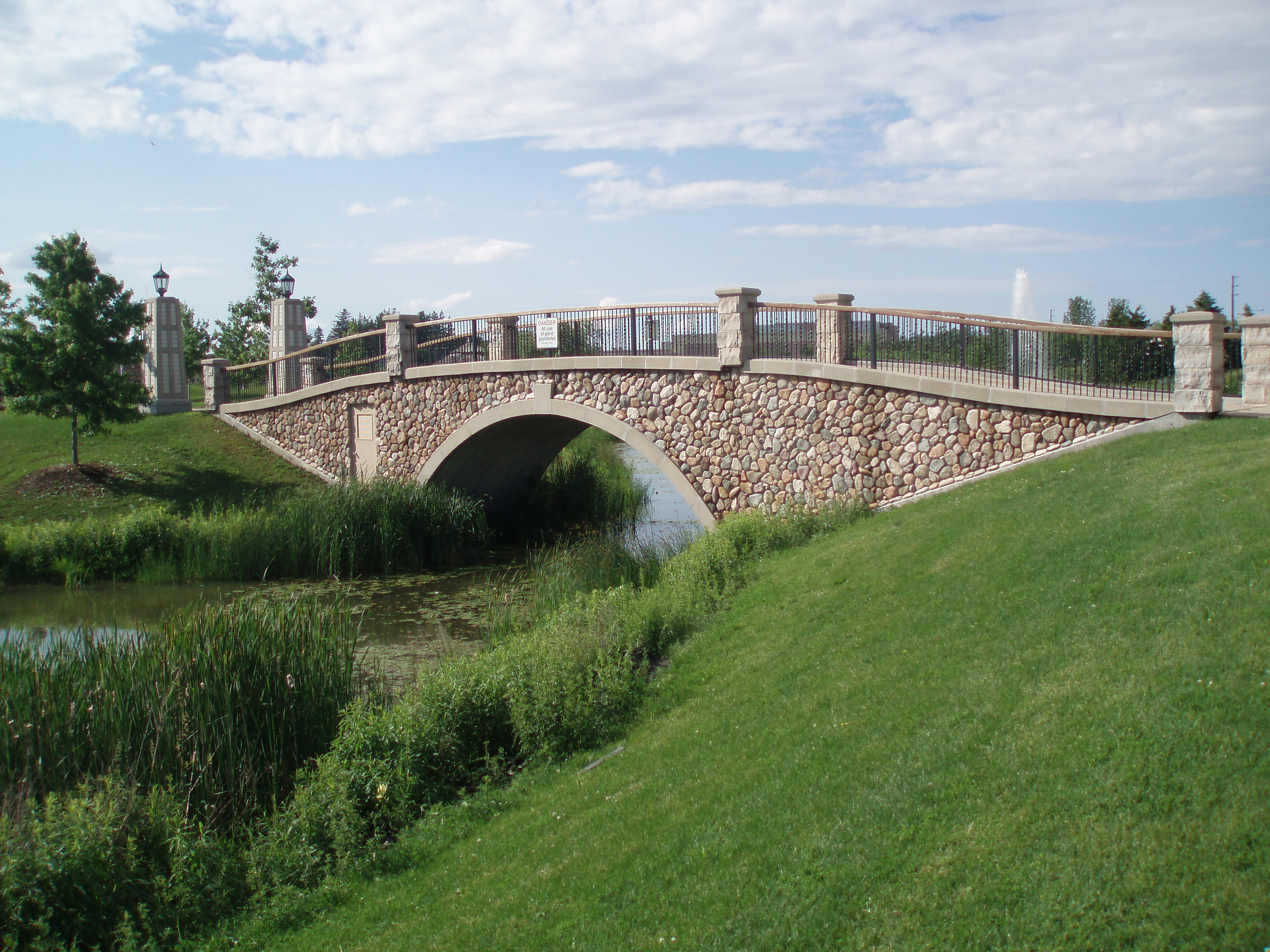
Footbridge in Richmond Green Sports Centre and Park

Richmond Hill is bounded by Bloomington Rd. (Aurora town limit) to the north, York Regional Road 7 (Vaughan city limit west of Yonge St., Markham city limit east of Yonge St.) to the south, Bathurst St. (Vaughan city limit) to the west, and Ontario Highway 404 (Markham city limit) to the east. Its southern limit is about 4 kilometres (2.5 miles) north of the Toronto city limit, Steeles Avenue, and approximately 20 kilometres (12 miles) north of the downtown core of Toronto. The city extends 14 kilometres (8.7 miles) north–south and 7 kilometres (4.3 miles) east–west.

The city itself is at a higher elevation than other communities within the Greater Toronto Area, and with the exclusion of areas closely alongside its borders, the constituent of York region with the greatest height above sea level. The uneven melting of the glacier that formed the city led to a varied geography within the city's own borders, leading to such features as kettle lakes, minor tributaries and the Oak Ridges Moraine.

Being elevated above the surrounding region, precipitation in the city tends to flow outwards via the multitude of streams and rivers that flow through the city. Principally, water flow is in one of two directions, south to Lake Ontario or north to Lake Simcoe where they join up with larger tributaries that feed into the water bodies. Of note are the Rouge, Humber, and Don rivers, which receive some of their flow from sources in the city.

Richmond Hill is located on the Oak Ridges Moraine, an elevated region of loose soil which comprises a roughly the northern third of the land area of the city. Its porous nature allows the collection and natural filtering of waters that flow through it, which are then fed into multiple underground aquifers. While the city receives its water from the City of Toronto, these aquifers are an important source for those with their own wells in addition to surrounding communities. The ability of the soil to hold so much water means that, despite Richmond Hill's comparatively high elevation, it has a very high water table, which poses some problems to construction. The moraine is also host to a staggering amount of biodiversity, and in recent years, there has been a considerable amount of pressure applied to the government to shield the area from development. Consequently, a significant portion of Richmond Hill is subject to the Ontario Government's Greenbelt legislation.

Climate data for Richmond Hill Climate ID: 6157012; coordinates 43°52′38″N 79°26′52″W; elevation: 240 m (790 ft); 1981–2010 normals
Month	Jan	Feb	Mar	Apr	May	Jun	Jul	Aug	Sep	Oct	Nov	Dec	Year
Record high °C (°F)	14.5 (58.1)	14.5 (58.1)	25.5 (77.9)	31.0 (87.8)	34.5 (94.1)	35.0 (95.0)	37.0 (98.6)	37.0 (98.6)	34.4 (93.9)	29.4 (84.9)	23.3 (73.9)	20.0 (68.0)	37.0 (98.6)
Mean daily maximum °C (°F)	−2.2 (28.0)	−0.6 (30.9)	4.4 (39.9)	12.1 (53.8)	19.0 (66.2)	24.2 (75.6)	26.8 (80.2)	25.6 (78.1)	20.9 (69.6)	13.7 (56.7)	6.7 (44.1)	0.8 (33.4)	12.6 (54.7)
Daily mean °C (°F)	−6.2 (20.8)	−4.9 (23.2)	−0.3 (31.5)	6.9 (44.4)	13.3 (55.9)	18.7 (65.7)	21.4 (70.5)	20.3 (68.5)	15.9 (60.6)	9.1 (48.4)	3.1 (37.6)	−2.7 (27.1)	7.9 (46.2)
Mean daily minimum °C (°F)	−10.2 (13.6)	−9.1 (15.6)	−5 (23)	1.7 (35.1)	7.7 (45.9)	13.1 (55.6)	15.9 (60.6)	15.1 (59.2)	10.8 (51.4)	4.5 (40.1)	−0.5 (31.1)	−6.1 (21.0)	3.2 (37.8)
Record low °C (°F)	−32.5 (−26.5)	−29 (−20)	−27 (−17)	−15 (5)	−5.6 (21.9)	0.6 (33.1)	4.4 (39.9)	3.0 (37.4)	−3.3 (26.1)	−7.8 (18.0)	−15.5 (4.1)	−30 (−22)	−32.5 (−26.5)
Average precipitation mm (inches)	62.3 (2.45)	58.0 (2.28)	58.8 (2.31)	70.1 (2.76)	81.6 (3.21)	80.2 (3.16)	83.5 (3.29)	89.2 (3.51)	88.4 (3.48)	69.1 (2.72)	87.2 (3.43)	66.8 (2.63)	895.2 (35.24)
Average rainfall mm (inches)	25.2 (0.99)	26.3 (1.04)	33.6 (1.32)	62.5 (2.46)	81.5 (3.21)	80.2 (3.16)	83.5 (3.29)	89.2 (3.51)	88.4 (3.48)	67.6 (2.66)	73.5 (2.89)	33.1 (1.30)	744.6 (29.31)
Average snowfall cm (inches)	37.1 (14.6)	31.7 (12.5)	25.2 (9.9)	7.6 (3.0)	0.1 (0.0)	0.0 (0.0)	0.0 (0.0)	0.0 (0.0)	0.0 (0.0)	1.5 (0.6)	13.7 (5.4)	33.7 (13.3)	150.6 (59.3)
Average precipitation days (≥ 0.2 mm)	18.3	13.9	14.4	13.6	13.6	11.9	11.3	11.2	12.4	13.4	15.2	16.2	165.2
Average rainy days (≥ 0.2 mm)	4.9	4.3	7.4	11.7	13.6	11.9	11.3	11.2	12.4	13.3	11.4	7.0	120.2
Average snowy days (≥ 0.2 cm)	15.3	11.3	9.0	3.2	0.12	0.0	0.0	0.0	0.0	0.62	5.3	11.6	56.5
Source: Environment and Climate Change Canada

== Landmarks ==
- Hillcrest Mall, a large and popular shopping mall located on the northwest corner of Yonge Street and Carrville Road. It has 135 shops, services, and restaurants.
- The Emerald Isle Motel on Yonge Street is known to display conservative rhymes and provocative quotes on their sign. These quotes usually relate to current events. The film Man of the Year, starring Robin Williams, was filmed at the motel in late 2005. This motel also was featured in the film The Wrong Guy. The motel closed in 2020 and ready to demolish.
- The David Dunlap Observatory is home to the largest reflecting telescope in Canada. The 74 in (1,900 mm) telescope was the second largest in the world upon its construction in 1935. The observatory was a research facility of the University of Toronto.
- The original Canadian burger chain Harvey's restaurant was opened in Richmond Hill in 1959 at the corner of Yonge Street and Observatory Lane. It was demolished in February 2012 and was replaced by the Xpression condominiums.
- The City of Richmond Hill Municipal Office Building, at 225 East Beaver Creek Road. The building serves as the seat of government of the municipality. Most of the city departments are located there, and all public Council and Committee Meetings are also held in this building.
- Richmond Hill United Church, with a prominent three-tier steeple, dates back to 1880.
- The Richmond Hill Centre for the Performing Arts, located in downtown Richmond Hill.
- The Richmond Hill Central Library, a massive public library located in the heart of the city.
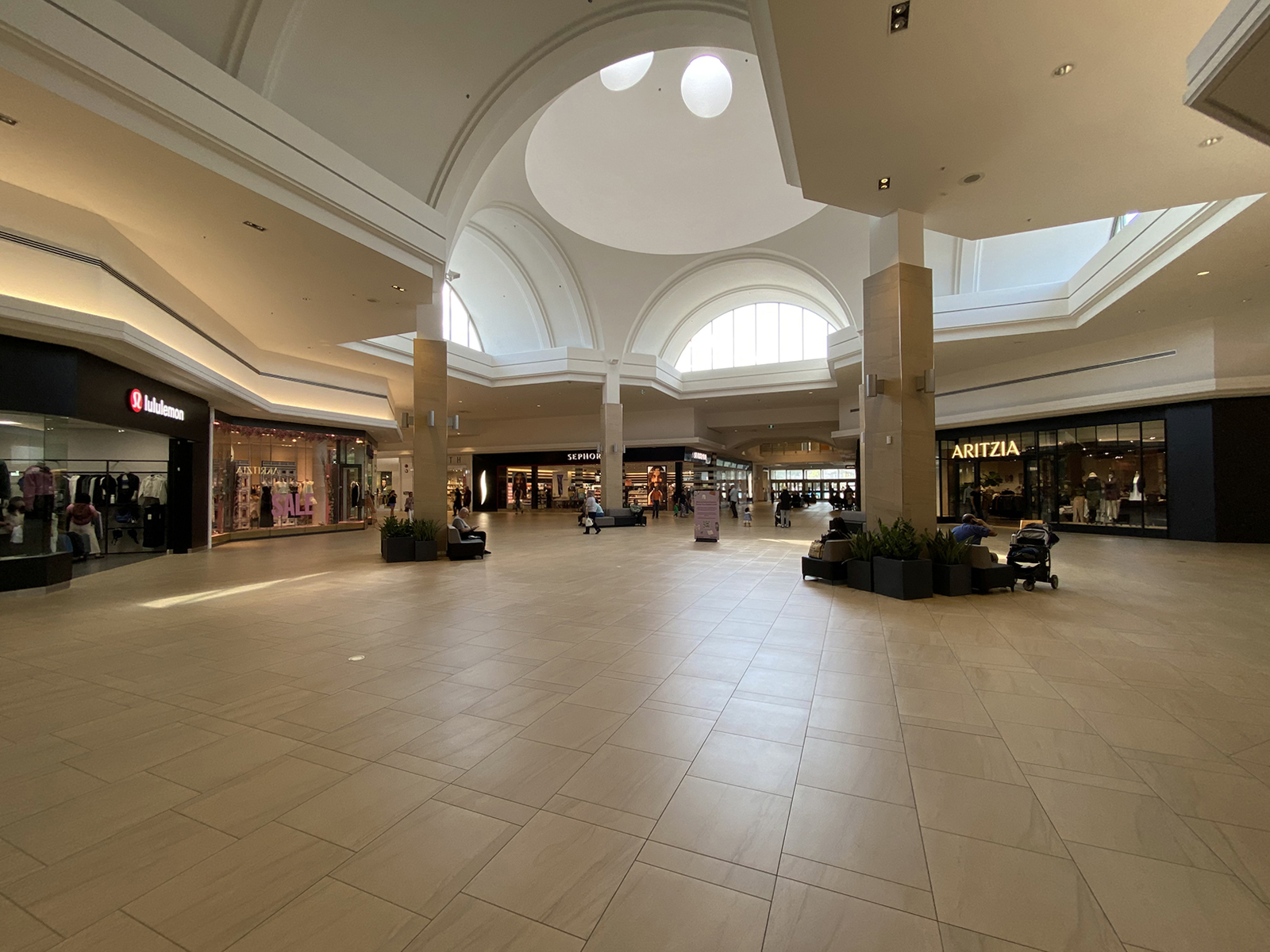
Hillcrest Mall

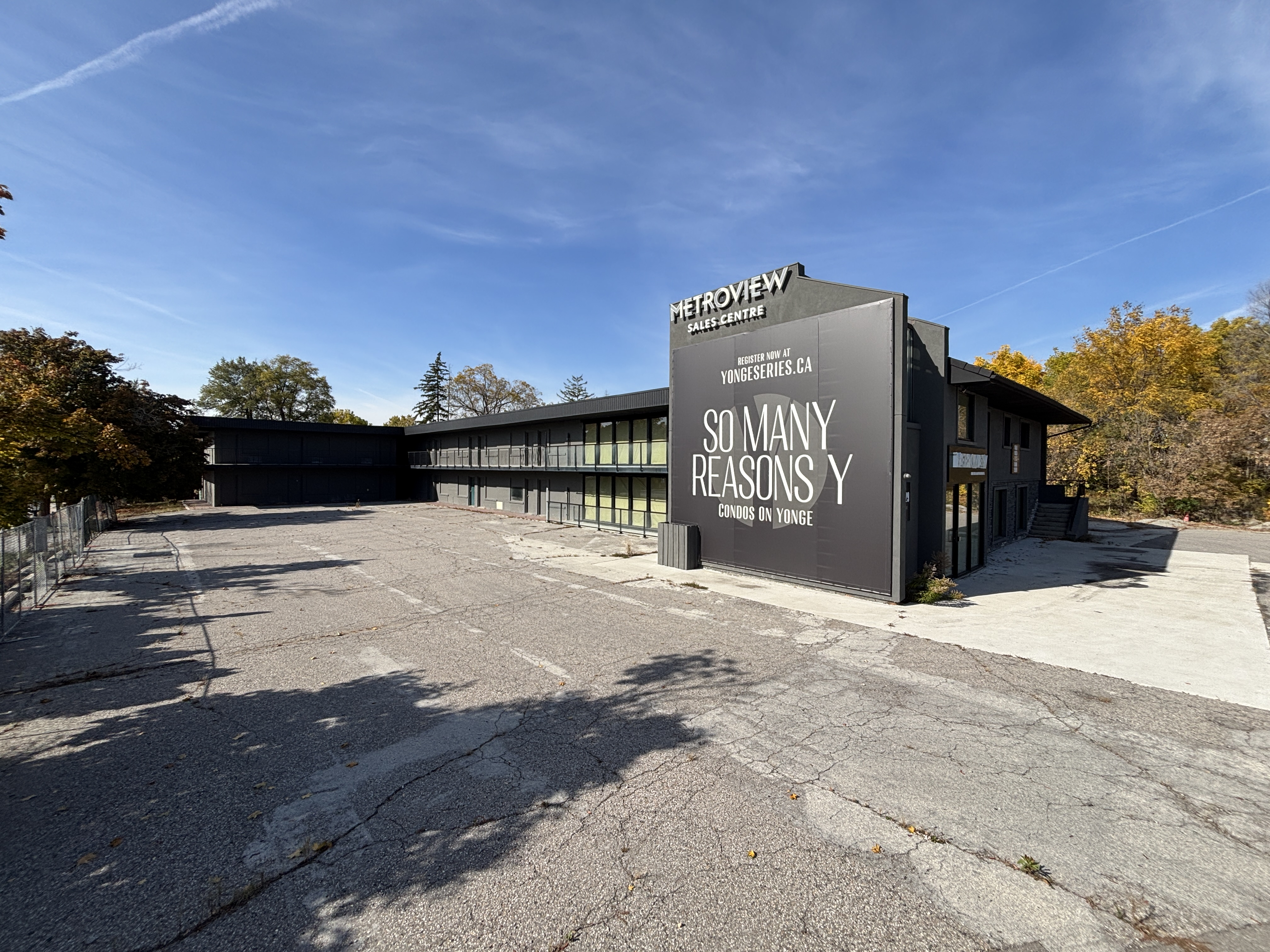
Former The Emerald Isle Motel on Yonge Street

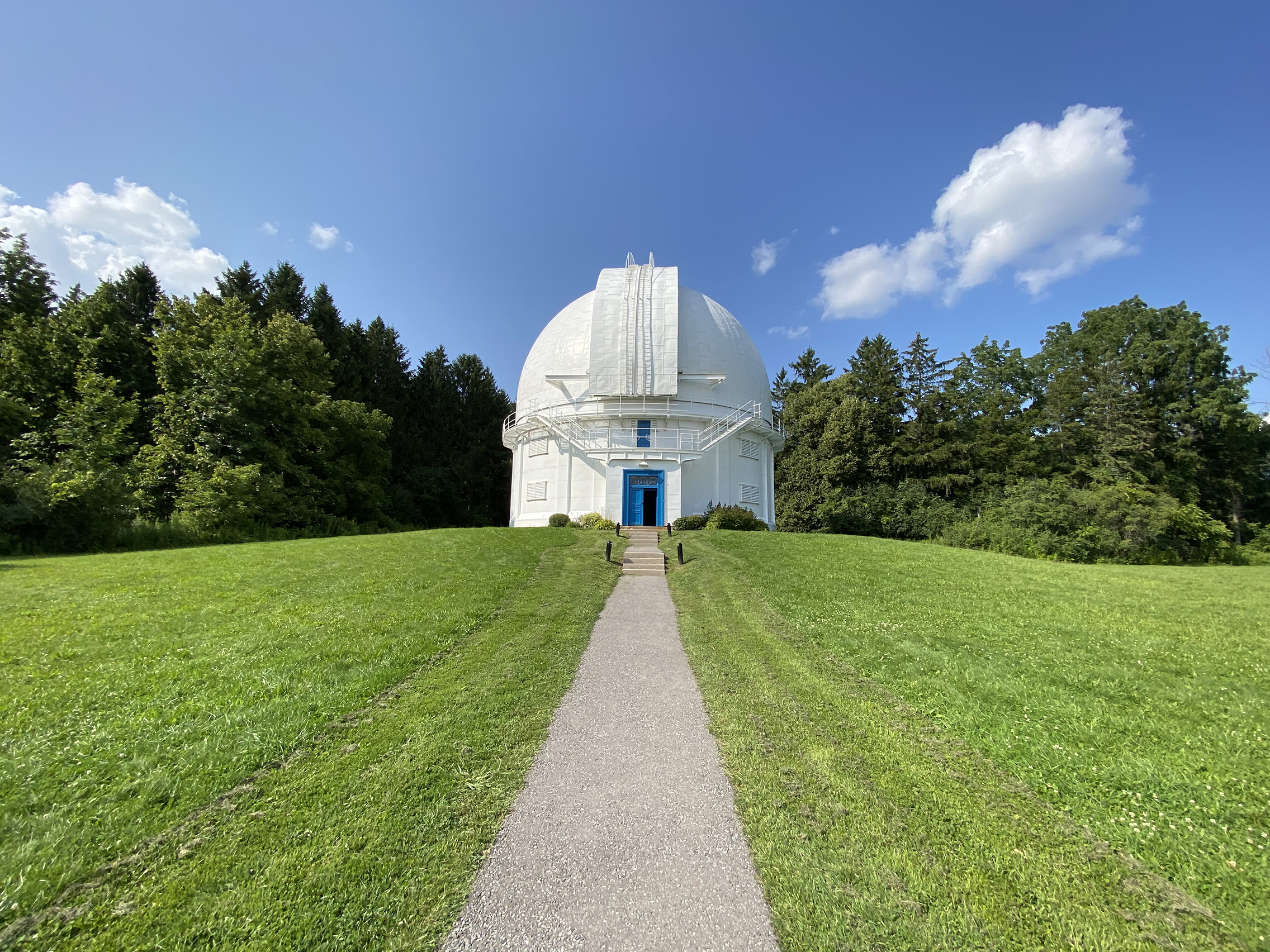
David Dunlap Observatory

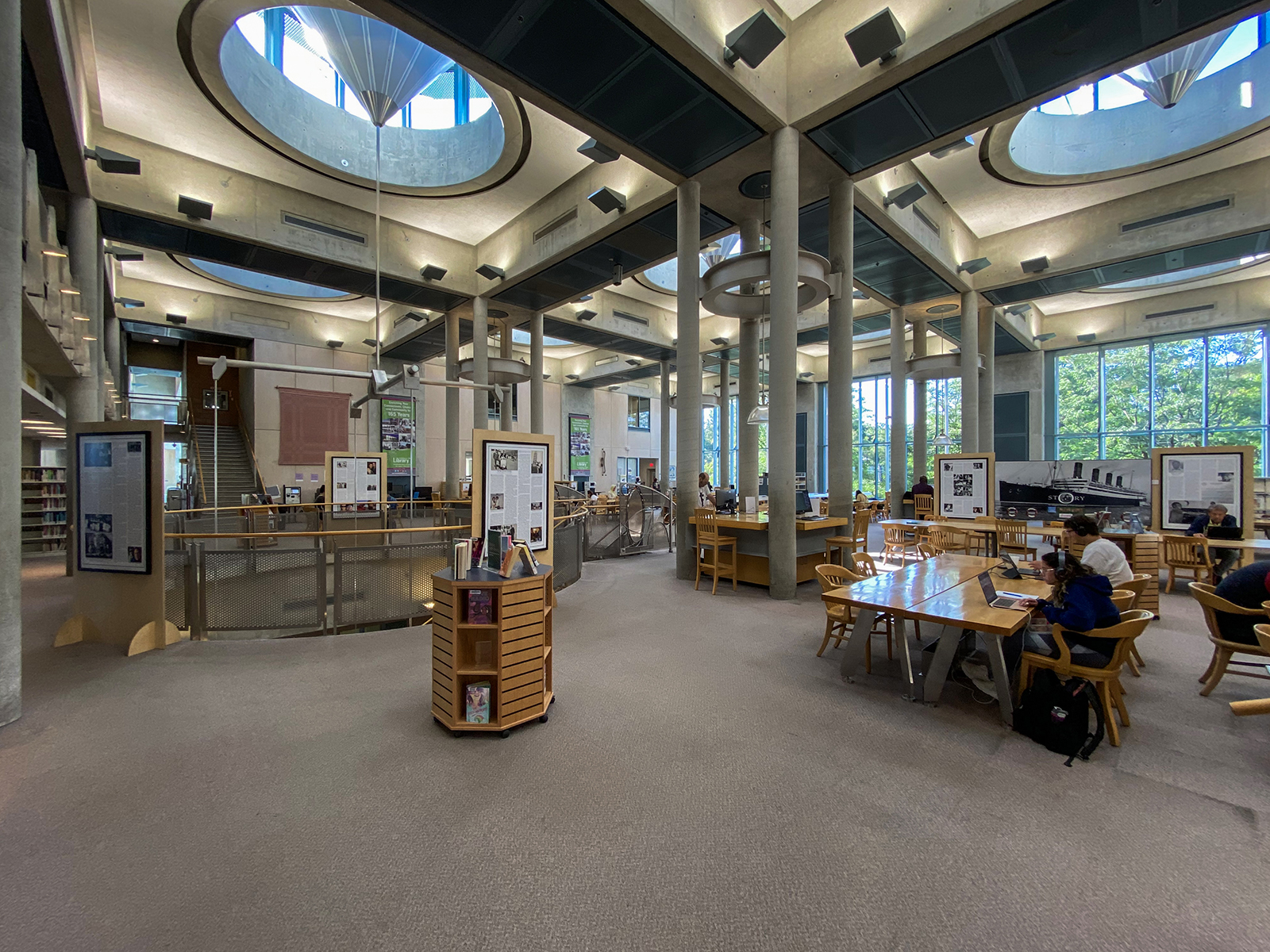
Richmond Hill Central Library

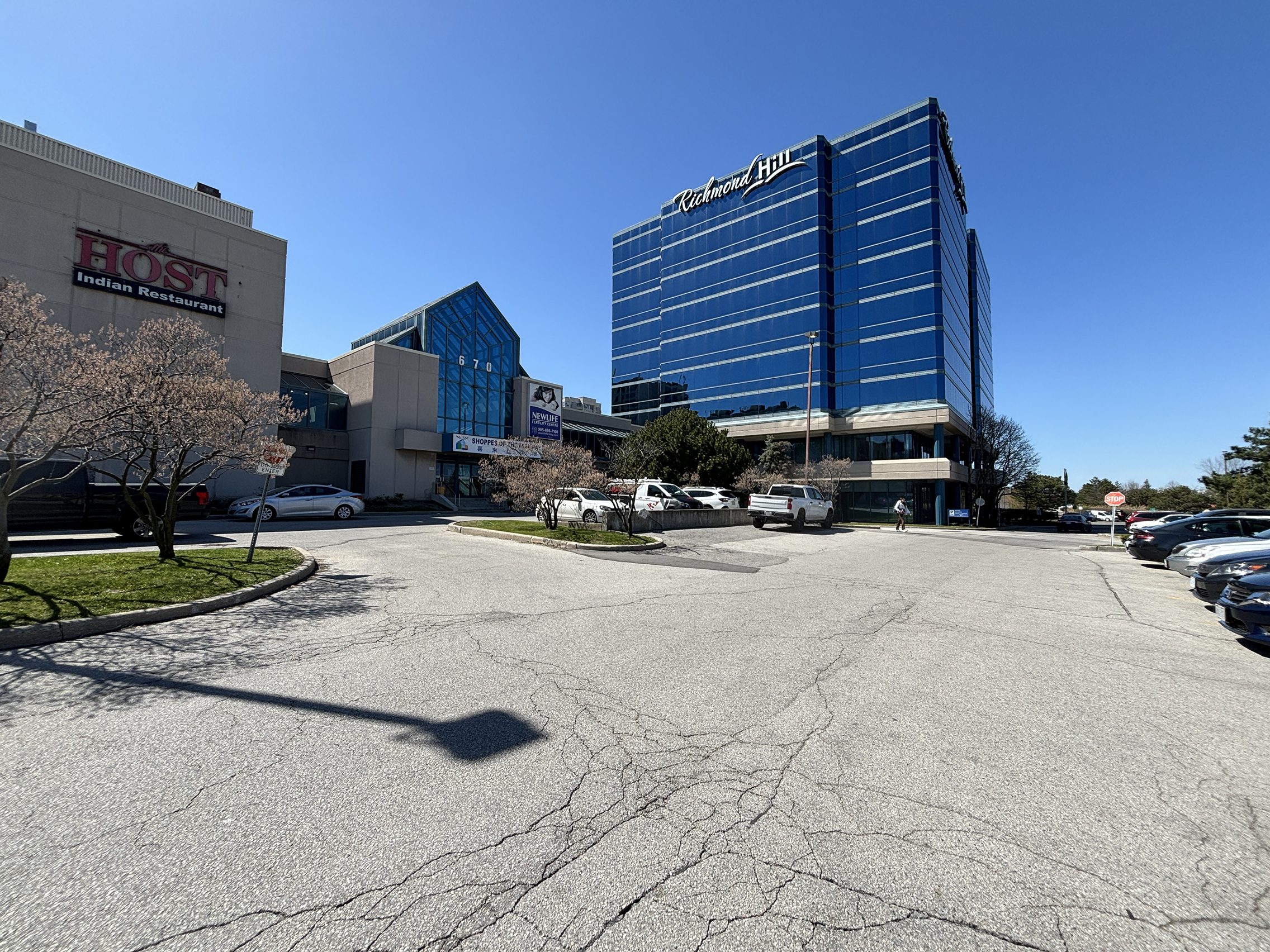
Richmond Hill city office at Highway 7 & East Beaver Creek Road

== Media ==
- Richmond Hill Liberal, Richmond Hill's newspaper
- CFMJ AM 640 (AM 640 Talk Radio)
- ISIGN Media

== Affiliated cities and municipalities ==
Richmond Hill is sister cities with Lakeland, Florida, and twinned with Netanya, Israel and Shijiazhuang, China.
