= ISIGN Media =

Canadian marketing company

iSign Media Solutions, Inc.
- Traded as: TSX-V: ISD
- Founded: 2006
- Founder: Alex Romanov
- Headquarters: Richmond Hill, Ontario, Canada
- Key people: Alex Romanov CEO (2006-2013+)
- Website: www.isignmedia.com

iSIGN Media (iSIGN) is a proximity marketing company headquartered in Richmond Hill, Ontario, with R&D and customer support operations in Vancouver, British Columbia and Tampa, Florida. The company uses Bluetooth, mobile, WiFi and location-aware technologies to deliver rich-media, permission-based messages at designated locations or at events, such as Super Bowl XLVII. The company installs smart antenna technology to enable customers to deliver commercial offers while protecting consumer privacy.

== History ==
iSIGN was founded in 2006 by Alex Romanov, who has served as president, chief executive officer and director for the company. iSIGN began as a digital signage company offering location-based proximity marketing from signs to handheld mobile devices. It went public in 2009 on the TSX Venture Exchange, then began trading on OTCQX under the symbol "ISDSF" in June 2012. Following an agreement with Mac’s Convenience Stores, iSIGN reportedly became the world's largest interactive digital signage network with 6,000 digital signs in over 1,400 locations. ISIGN reports identifying 1.5 million mobile devices per day.

=== Corporate governance ===
As of 2013, the company's chief executive officer was Alex Romanov.

== Technology ==
iSIGN’s Interactive Media Solutions (IMS) mobile messaging product consists of a proprietary IMS 2.0 platform as well as an IMS 3.1 version featuring dual porting for Linux or Windows, multi-lingual capabilities and 128-bit encryption software for security.

The Smart Antenna, rolled out in 2012, uses the same Bluetooth technology as the IMS but also has WiFi capabilities to connect with iPhone users, broadening mobile messaging capabilities. Smart Antennas have a 300-foot (100m) Bluetooth message broadcasting and WiFi accessible content transmission radius. iSIGN’s patent-pending platform collects and organizes metrics and delivers customizable analytics to merchants while protecting consumer privacy.

iSIGN launched a Smart Player in August 2013, the first product of its kind that combines digital signage with mobile messaging capabilities via wireless connectivity. The Smart Player is designed to distribute marketing messages to mobile and stationary devices within range of its location.

== Customers and Partners ==
=== Canada ===
iSIGN Media customers include Mac's Convenience Stores and Couche-Tard outlets (from 2012), and the BC Sports Hall of Fame in Vancouver, British Columbia.

=== United States ===
Smart Antennas have been installed in several Florida cities, including Safety Harbor, Dunedin, Orlando and Clearwater. In 2012, Smart Antennas were installed in the New Orleans tourist attraction Mardi Gras World.

== Partnerships and Licensees ==
Partners include: AOpen America Inc., TELUS, Keyser, and IBM, with solution distribution by BlueStar Inc. iSIGN holds licensing and distribution agreements with GraphicMedia.
