= Dollar, Ontario =

Dollar
- Locality
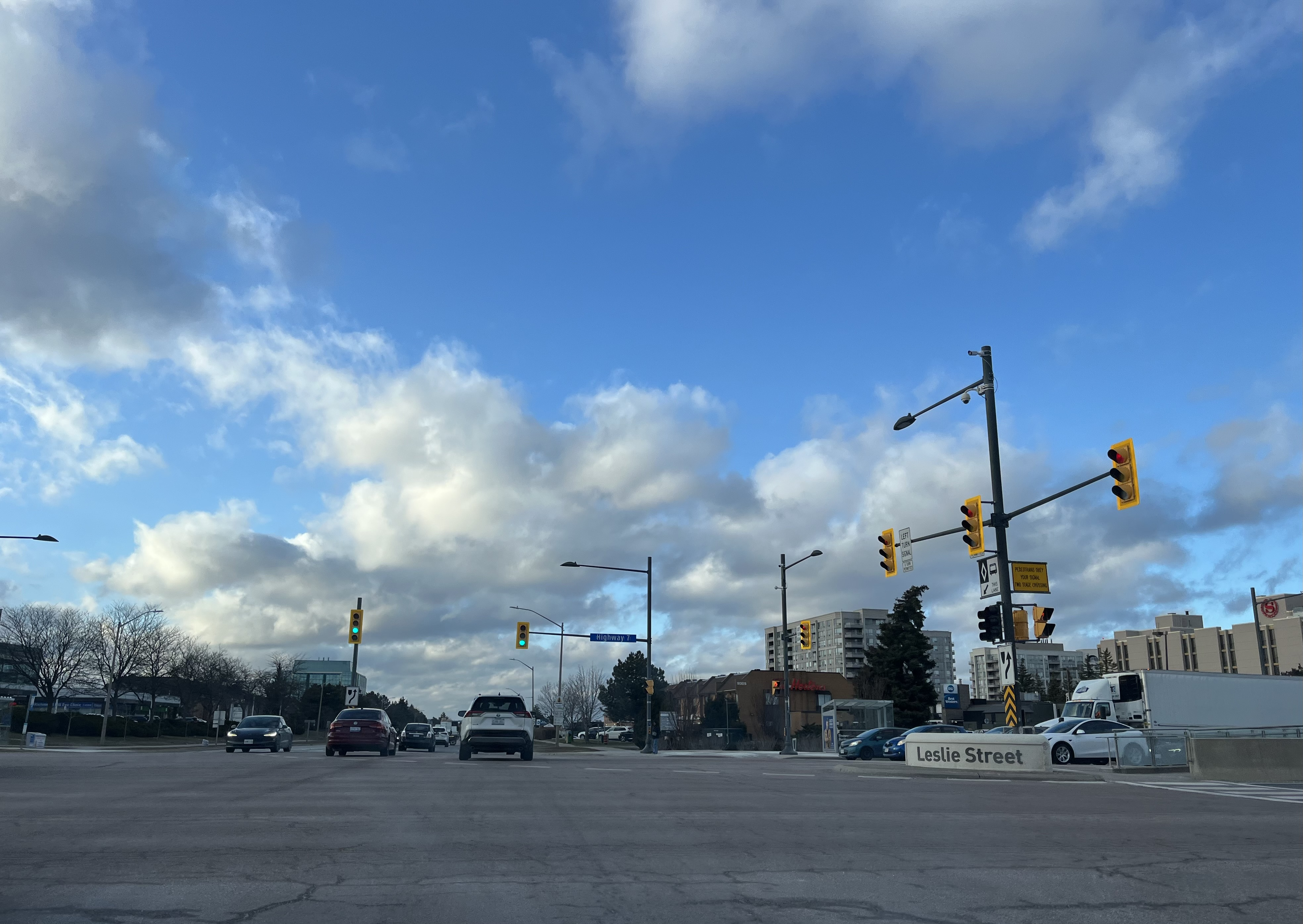
- Present day of where the former settlement was located

- Location of Dollar
- Coordinates: 43°50′41″N 79°22′56″W
- Country: Canada
- Province: Ontario
- Regional Municipality: York
- Municipality: Markham
- Elevation: 200 m (660 ft)
- Time zone: UTC-5 (Eastern Time Zone)
  - Summer (DST): UTC-4 (Eastern Time Zone)
- Area codes: 905, 289, 365

Dollar is a former community of Markham Township, now the cities of Markham and Richmond Hill, Ontario, Canada and was located near the corner of 3rd Line and 15th Avenue (present-day Leslie Street and Highway 7). In 1869, Dollar was granted a post office, which was located on the north-west corner of Line 3 (Leslie Street) and 15th Avenue. In 1871 Dollar also had general store, a blacksmith shop and a church. The Zion Wesleyan Methodist Church was built about 1870 on Lot 10, Concession 3, on the east side of Third Line, just south of the intersection.

With the arrival of the railroad through Markham Village and Unionville in the 1870s, the importance of smaller communities like Dollar began to fade. When rural mail delivery was instituted in 1914, Dollar was put on Rural Route #2, Gormley.

In 1962 the name "Dollar" was rescinded and the hamlet ceased to exist. On January 1, 1971, the north side of Highway 7 was annexed to the-then Town of Richmond Hill. The last three historical homes were demolished in 1972 to prepare for the construction of the Best Western Parkway Hotel Toronto North. Today the former hamlet of Dollar is in close proximity to Highway 404. The site of the former post office is now the Times Square shopping centre. The City of Markham is planning for significant future development on the south side of the intersection.
