= List of people from Richmond Hill, Ontario =

This is a list of notable people who are from Richmond Hill, Ontario, or have spent a large part or formative part of their career in the city.

== Actors ==
- Lisa Berry, actor
- Ramin Karimloo, actor and singer
- Drew Marshall, television personality
- Dylan Neal, actor
- Steve Patterson, comedian
- Italia Ricci, actor
- Cristine Rotenberg, actor and YouTube personality
- Mag Ruffman, actor
- R.H. Thomson, actor
- Jonathon Young, actor
- Noam Zylberman, voice actor

== Athletes ==
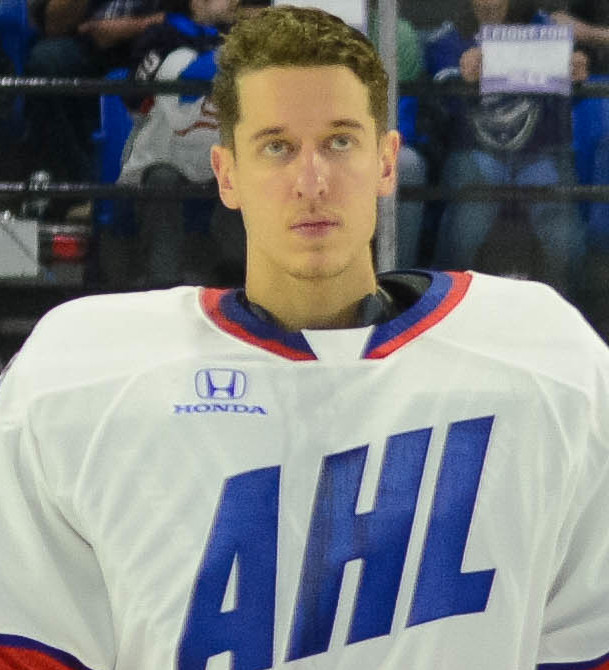
Jordan Binnington

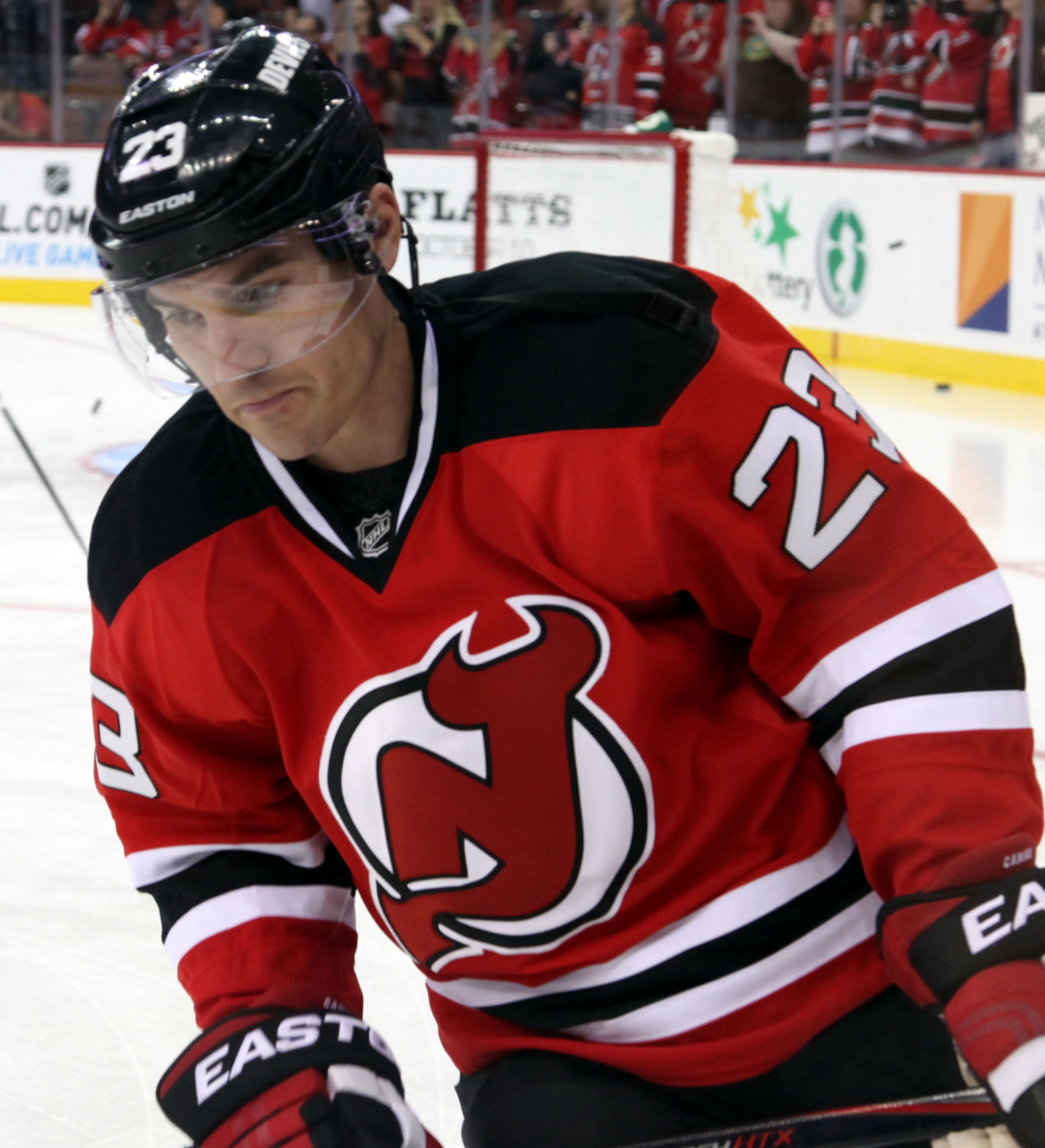
Mike Cammalleri

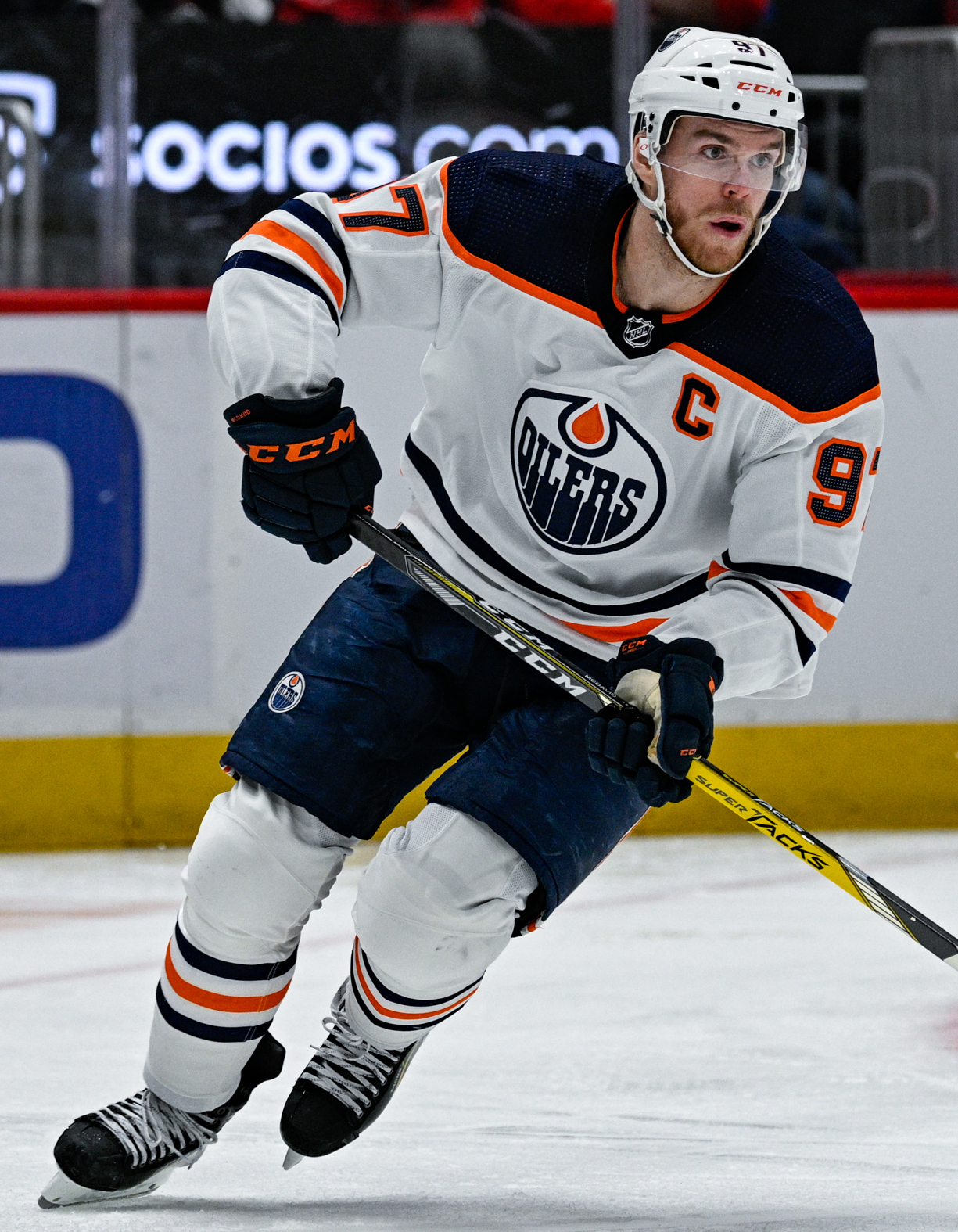
Connor McDavid

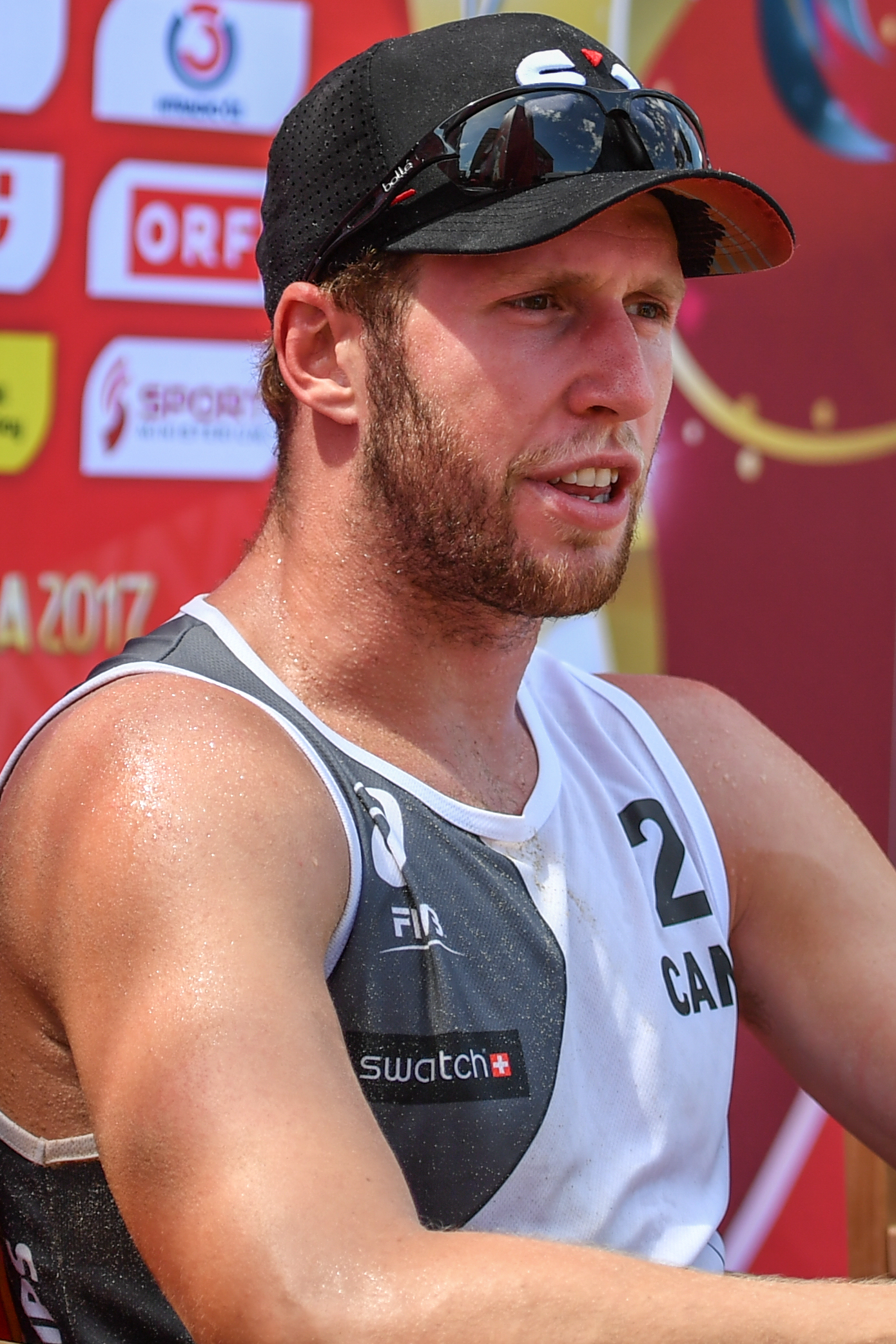
Sam Schachter

- Luca Accettola, soccer player
- Mobolade Ajomale, Olympic sprinter
- Bill Armstrong, ice hockey player
- Charles Assmann, football player
- Lee Bentham, racing driver
- Jordan Binnington, ice hockey player, 2019 Stanley Cup Champion
- Josh Binstock, Olympic beach volleyball player
- Luciano Borsato, ice hockey player
- Cassie Campbell, former ice hockey player, current broadcaster
- Michael Cammalleri, ice hockey player
- Daniel Catenacci, ice hockey player
- Rick Cornacchia, general manager of the National Training Rinks in Richmond Hill
- Jonathan D'Aversa, ice hockey player
- Michael Dal Colle, ice hockey player
- David Davidson, baseball player
- Stefan Della Rovere, ice hockey player
- Anthony Di Biase, soccer player
- Curtis Joseph, ice hockey player
- Mara Jones, rower
- Derek Joslin, ice hockey player
- Scott Kosmachuk, ice hockey player
- Christine Peng-Peng Lee, artistic gymnast
- David Levin, Israeli ice hockey player
- Ryan Lomberg, ice hockey player, 2024 Stanley Cup Champion
- Connor McDavid, ice hockey player
- John McFarland, ice hockey player
- Julian Melchiori, ice hockey player
- Alexandra Najarro, former figure skater
- Frank Nigro, ice hockey player
- Jeff O'Neill, ice hockey player
- Emeka Ononye, soccer player
- Pete Orr, baseball player
- Matthew Palleschi, soccer player
- Theo Peckham, ice hockey player
- Taylor Pendrith, PGA golfer
- Merlyn Phillips, ice hockey player
- Keith Redmond, former ice hockey player
- Austin Ricci, soccer player
- Andrei Rogozine, figure skater
- Rob Rusnov, Olympic archer
- Emmanuel Sandhu, figure skater
- Sam Schachter, Olympic beach volleyball player
- Denis Shapovalov, tennis player
- Elvis Stojko, World Champion figure skater
- Trish Stratus, retired WWE wrestler
- Ryan Tverberg, ice hockey player
- Bob Wall, ice hockey player
- Jason Wilson, ice hockey player
- Carol Zhao, tennis player

== Entrepreneurs ==
- Isai and Mark Scheinberg, co-founders of PokerStars

== Musicians ==
- The Flatliners, music band
- Andy Hull, singer
- Dallas Good, The Sadies
- Kim Richardson, singer
- Marlee Scott, singer
- Steve Sexton, composer
- Wendy Son, singer in Korean pop girl group Red Velvet

== Politicians ==
- Leona Alleslev, former Member of Parliament
- Dave Barrow, former mayor of Richmond Hill
- William F. Bell, former mayor of Richmond Hill
- Isaac Crosby, politician
- William Harrison, politician
- Majid Jowhari, politician
- James Langstaff, politician
- Abraham Law, politician
- Costas Menegakis, politician
- Don Meredith, politician
- Reza Moridi, politician
- William H. Pugsley, politician
- Peter G. Savage, politician
- Alfred Stong, politician
- William Trench III, politician
- Daisy Wai, politician
- David West (Canadian politician), Mayor of Richmond Hill
- Bryon Wilfert, politician
- Kathleen Wynne, former Premier of Ontario

== Sciences ==
- Tom Bolton, astronomer

== Writers ==
- Robert Livingstone, sport business journalist
- Tracy Moore, journalist
- Farley Mowat, novelist
- Mohammed Rustom, scholar
- Craig Walker, writer

== Other ==
- Hannah Alper, teen activist and blogger
- Grace Marks, convicted 19th century murderer
- Susannah Maxwell, one of the city's first Black residents and Canada's oldest citizen at the time of her death in 1923
- Poorya Nazari, poker player
- Henri Nouwen, worked in L'Arche community in Richmond Hill
- Kevin Robertson, bishop
- Anastasia Synn, performer
- Matthew Teefy, historical figure
- Mariana Valente, beauty pageant title holder

== See also ==
- List of people from Ontario
