= History of Richmond Hill, Ontario =

History of a Canadian city

The history of Richmond Hill began when the First Nations came and settled in the area. With the Toronto Purchase, the city gradually expanded with new greenhouse industries and improved transportation infrastructure.

== First Nations ==
The first humans to come to the area were probably Paleo-Indians between 9000 and 7000 BCE. The first archaeological evidence of their presence found was a single scraper found at the Mortson site near Leslie Street and Elgin Mills Road. A few more artifacts were later found east of Lake Wilcox at the Esox site and as of 1988, fourteen sites in Richmond Hill have produced Paleo-Indian artifacts. The people in southern Ontario at this time were organized in nomadic bands, and would have migrated through the area, establishing camps then moving on. The Silver Stream site, which is located on a tributary of the Rouge River west of Leslie Street, between Elgin Mills Road and Major Mackenzie Drive, has yielded 27 artifacts that come from peoples of the Paleo-Indian cultures, one of which was dated to 1800 BCE.

Eventually, the regional cultural transitioned from Paleo-Indian to Archaic, and then from Archaic to Early Iroquoian. The oldest known Iroquoian site in Richmond Hill is the Wilcox Lake Site, on the east side of Lake Wilcox, which has been dated to 1300 CE. The site covers 12,000 square metres. Human habitation of the area became permanent settlements around this time, where it had previously been nomadic. Well studied is the Boyle-Atkinson Site, a Late Iroquoian settlement southwest of the intersection of Yonge Street and Major Mackenzie Drive. The location was first identified as the remains of an old settlement by David Boyle in the late 1860s. The site was occupied from about 1450 to 1500 CE and was a large village in the area, with at least nine longhouses identified as well as two other buildings. Several other sites in Richmond Hill are known to be from Iroquoian peoples who lived in the area between 1300 and 1550 CE, including the McGaw, Murphy-Goulding, Orion, Reuben Heise and Watford sites. The arrangement of the sites suggest they represent a single community periodically relocating. Around 1550 tensions between the Iroquois of southern Ontario and the Five Nations Iroquois in New York led to their emigration en masse to the Huron Confederacy between Lake Simcoe and Georgian Bay, and the archaeological evidence suggests the Iroquois inhabitants of Richmond Hill left the area about that time.

The area was uninhabited for at least 100 years after the exodus of the Iroquois. Sometime in the late 17th or early 18th century, the Mississauga Indians moved into the area from the north. The Mississaugas had a nomadic lifestyle, and moved seasonally across much of what is now York Region and the Golden Horseshoe.

== Toronto purchase and early settlement ==
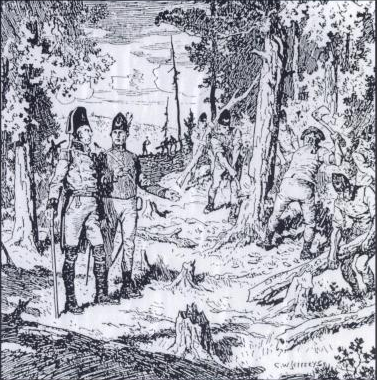
John Graves Simcoe and Augustus Jones, supervising the Queen's Rangers of York cutting trees during the construction of Yonge Street, 1795.

The Toronto Purchase took place on September 23, 1787, between the British and the Mississauga Indians. The purchase was understood by David Smith, the Surveyor General for Upper Canada to include the Richmond Hill area. The Mississauga Indians had a different understanding of the northern limit of the purchase. Conflicts arose between the Europeans that began to move into the area and the Mississaugas. The area was first surveyed by Augustus Jones for Lieutenant-Governor John Graves Simcoe in 1794 while he was constructing Yonge Street. By 1797, the Mississaugas in the area had left for the regions of Niagara and Peterborough. A meeting between British officials and Mississauga chiefs in 1805 clarified the northern border placing Richmond Hill within the land of the Toronto Purchase. At this time, the land that later became Richmond Hill was divided between Vaughan township west of Yonge Street, and Markham township east of Yonge Street.

The first European settlers to arrive in Richmond Hill were Balsar and Katharine Munshaw, accompanied by their children: John, George, Jacob, Betsy and Polly, who arrived in Richmond Hill in the spring of 1794 from Pennsylvania. They cleared a plot of land in the Elgin Mills area (then still in Markham). That summer, their sixth child, a daughter named Susan Munshaw was born. She was the first European settler born in Richmond Hill, and the oldest recorded birth. The Munshaws soon found their location too isolated from other European settlers in the area, and resettled themselves on the south-west corner of Yonge Street and Highway 7, outside of Richmond Hill (in what is the Vaughan section of Thornhill).

In 1794, the present-day Bayview Avenue and Leslie Street were also laid out and planned, and sometime in the late part of 1794 the first settlers arrived in the area. Some two hundred people led by William Berczy arrived in Markham township from western New York and Pennsylvania after being promised land grants in Markham township in exchange for working on the construction of Yonge Street, in an arrangement Berczy made with the Executive Council of Upper Canada. The surveyor assigned to the area known as Markham township was Abraham Iredell, he was able to begin settling the followers of Berczy in Markham township by November 1794. Some were settled in the second and third concessions which today are part of Richmond Hill, others were settled further east in what would become Markham. Arriving in November, the settlers spent the first winter in miserable conditions, unable to grow any crops before winter. Some supplies were made available to them by the German Land Company of New York and the government of Upper Canada. Crop failures occurred with these settlers in 1795 and 1796, and soon a third of them had left their homesteads. In 1796 it was decided that deeds for these lots would not be issued to Berczy and his associates, as they were not naturalised citizens of the United Kingdom. The German Land Company of New York stopped supporting the settlers and Berczy left, but some settlers stayed on. The presence of these German speaking settlers in Markham township would attract other German speakers in the coming years.

The next settler to try his hand at the Vaughan township part of Richmond Hill was John C. Stooks, who arrived there with his wife in June 1797. Arriving in York, the Stooks travelled north along Yonge Street and settled on lot 47 of Vaughan township, on the west side of Yonge Street one lot north of Major Mackenzie Drive. The Stooks, too, found the life a difficult one, they cleared little land and built only a modest house before abandoning the area and moving on. Stooks would serve in the York Militia during the War of 1812, then acquiring land in Nottawasaga Township and later moved to King Township.

The first settlers to come to Richmond Hill and remain there for more than a few years were Hugh and Ann Shaw who arrived in 1798 and occupied lot 46 on the northeast corner of Yonge Street and Major Mackenzie Drive. Other lots along Yonge Street quickly became occupied, with Thomas Kinnear in lot 48, William Jarvis in lot 49 and William McLennan in lot 50 east of Yonge Street. West of Yonge street, Abner Miles occupied lot 46 and Samuel Heron on lot 49. The first settlers of the area received land grants either by the Lieutenant Governor directly or by the Executive Council of Upper Canada, typically either as a reward for previous military service to the British Empire or because they were believed to be good settlers who would contribute substantially to the development.

Lieutenant Governor John Graves Simcoe developed a special plan for the settlement of Yonge Street that excluded the usual crown reserves and clergy reserves and opened every lot along Yonge Street to permanent settlement. Other concessions in Vaughan township and Markham township allocated two of every seven lots as reserves, with one for the crown and one for the Protestant clergy. Simcoe felt it was important to develop Yonge Street as a route to Georgian Bay and the upper Great Lakes, which motivate his Yonge Street plan. Each 200-acre (0.81 km^{2}) lot was open to any settler who arrived on the land and developed it to meet certain conditions. In 1794, this condition was merely that a dwelling be erected on the plot of land and it be occupied within one year. In 1798, this condition was increased so that the dwelling had to measure at least 16 feet (4.9 m) by 20 feet (6.1 m), and no less than 5 acres (20,000 m^{2}) of land had to be cleared and fenced. Such settlers were additionally responsible for clearing their part of the Yonge Street right of way of brush. This plan proved ineffective, and lots on Yonge Street were slower to become occupied than the other lots in Vaughan township. In 1802, thirteen of Yonge Street's 25 concessions in Vaughan township were occupied, while in the next concession twenty of the twenty-five lots were occupied by that time. Development of Richmond Hill was also slow because of the lack of mills in the area.

Starting with forty-one people in 1798, French royalist settlers led by Joseph-Geneviève Comte de Puisaye, began settling along Yonge Street from today's Elgin Mills Road north to Stouffville Road. The Legislative Council of Upper Canada had some misgivings about the suitability of these settlers for the land, but the French Royalist officers who had left France after the French Revolution were given land grants comparable to those given to United Empire Loyalists who had come to Upper Canada after the American Revolution. Their community was named Windham to honour William Windham the British official who had arranged for their settlement there, but was locally referred to as Puisaye Town. De Puisaye and Augustus Jones went to survey the area in December 1798 while the other settlers remained in York, supported by government supplies. The de Puisaye settlers soon went north, and by January 1799 trees were being cleared from lots. On February 14, 1799, eighteen log cabins had been constructed, but not finished. The settlers' work slowed as 1799 dragged on, and individuals began leaving Windham for more developed areas: Montreal, New York and even Europe. De Puisaye soon moved to the Niagara region, although he continued to work for the betterment of Puisaye Town. Of all the settlers who came to Markham township with de Puisaye, only Le Chevalier Michel Saigeon seems to have stayed and prospered. Laurent Quetton St. George, a settler who arrived in Windham in 1799 also stayed in Upper Canada and prospered, making a career as a fur trader.

== Miles' Hill: The nineteenth century dawns ==
At the start of the 19th century, English speaking and German-speaking settlers were trickling into the areas of Vaughan township and Markham township that would later become Richmond Hill. By 1801 the area was known as Miles' Hill after Abner Miles and his son James Miles, who were prominent settlers. Miles had arrived in the area in 1800 from York, Upper Canada where he had run a general store on King Street. He opened a general store on Lot 45 on the east side of Yonge Street, and started a potash plant on Lot 45 on the west side of Yonge Street. That same year, he was elected tax assessor and tax collector for the townships of Vaughan, Markham, King and Whitchurch. He soon opened a tavern on the south-east corner of Yonge Street and Major Mackenzie Drive. After Abner Miles' death in 1806, his son James took over his father's businesses and role in the community. James Miles fit well into the role of a community leader. He was a local magistrate and justice of the peace. He was also a lieutenant in the York Militia during the War of 1812.

During the War of 1812, General Isaac Brock ordered all available men in Miles' Hill to form a company. The men assembled at the farm of United Empire Loyalist James Fulton, and Brock came to personally inspect them. They were formed into a company of the 1st Regiment of York Militia. The company spent the fall and winter of 1812/1813 in York, Upper Canada waiting for an attack, but it never came.

In 1817, James Miles and fellow resident of Miles' Hill Robert Marsh invited Presbyterian cleric William Jenkins to come to Miles' Hill and establish a congregation. Previous to this, religious services in the area had been conducted by travelling preachers. Jenkins was a popular preacher in New York state at the time. He accepted the invitation and founded congregations in both Miles' Hill and the township of Scarborough, Ontario. Jenkins preached on Miles' land, with a tree stump for a pulpit until 1821, when a church was constructed on land James Miles had donated. This small church was built on the west side of Yonge Street would later be named Richmond Hill Presbyterian Church.

== Miles' Hill becomes Richmond Hill ==
Sometime in the 1820s, Miles' Hill was renamed Richmond Hill. The oft repeated story is that it was so named after a visit to the area by Governor General of British North America Charles Lennox, 4th Duke of Richmond on July 13, 1819. The Canadian Permanent Committee on Geographical Names and other authorities report the honouring of Charles Lennox as the origin of the name. However, another well repeated story is that the area's first schoolteacher, Benjamin Barnard, was from a Richmond Hill in England, and taught all his classes the folk song The Lass of Richmond Hill because he was nostalgic for his old home. The popularity of the song with locals may account for the new name.

The Richmond Hill settlement continued to expand and mature as a farming community, especially with the improving condition of Yonge Street that led to daily stagecoaches coming to Richmond Hill from York and Holland Landing. By 1828, Richmond Hill featured a general store, schoolhouse, church, tavern, blacksmith's and carpenter's shop along Yonge Street. The population at this time was growing by nine percent a year. On January 6, 1836, James Sinclair was appointed postmaster for Richmond Hill. This established the name "Richmond Hill" in a government-approved way, and the name began to appear on maps. The newer immigrants and new generations increased land values and built larger houses with more elaborate and better finished estates. Anna Jameson came through the area in the fall of 1837 and remarked that the area had "some of the finest land and most prosperous estates in Upper Canada"

== Rebellion in Upper Canada ==
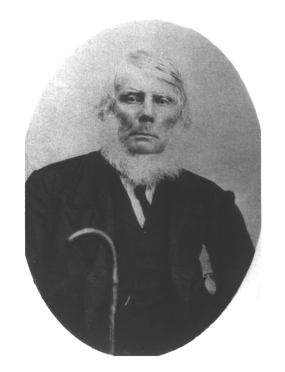
David Bridgeford.

The political climate of the 1820s and 1830s divided the residents of Richmond Hill into two groups: the Reformers and the Tories. Many of the newer immigrants came from well off British families that got along well with the elite society of Upper Canada. These settlers were Tories, allied with the establishment, usually members of the Church of England. The Reformers tended to be long-settled people of lower classes, often United Empire Loyalists or American immigrants. The 1828 election to the Legislative Assembly of Upper Canada elected two Reformers from the York riding, which included Richmond Hill. The two elected were William Lyon Mackenzie and Jesse Ketchum. Subsequent elections in 1830, 1834 and 1836 for the Legislative Assembly returned mostly Reform candidates. The crops of 1836 and 1837 did not do well, and Upper Canada was experiencing economic recession. Farming suffered under the banks' reducing the credit available and calling in outstanding loans. Farmers in Richmond Hill and the other outlying areas around Toronto became increasing sympathetic to talk of revolt. William Lyon Mackenzie issued a letter on 1 December 1837 calling the citizens of Upper Canada to revolt while the militia was in Lower Canada suppressing revolt there. On December 4, 1837, those swayed to his cause, and began moving south from the settlement in the north towards Toronto, where they planned to seize a weapon cache. They came through Richmond Hill in the afternoon, and caught the attention of Captain Hugh Stewart who was in a tavern just north of Richmond Hill. Loyalist residents of Richmond Hill began to assemble on the farm of "Colonel Moodie", a proud supporter of the Empire whose house made a natural gathering place for loyalists. Richmond Hill resident William Crew set out for Toronto to warn the government there of the oncoming rebels. When word reached Colonel Moodie that Crew had been detained by the rebels, Moodie set out with fellow Richmond Hill residents David Bridgeford and Hugh Stewart to head to Toronto and give warning. They encountered a road blockade by the rebels at Montgomery's Tavern. They charged the blockage and Moodie was shot. The company of men less Bridgeford were taken prisoner, and Moodie died later that night, the first casualty of the Upper Canada Rebellion. Bridgeford met up with John Powell and headed to Toronto, where he was able to warn lieutenant Governor of Upper Canada Francis Bond Head of the impending rebellion. Riding north afterwards to secure further volunteers, Bridgeford was captured by the rebels. On December 5, 1837, Mackenzie and some five hundred poorly equipped rebels marched south but were quickly rebuffed by sheriff William Jarvis and some twenty other men. They regrouped at Montgomery's Tavern, where the last battle of the rebellion was fought on December 7. The rebels were routed and Bridgeford and the other loyalist prisoners were freed. The rebellion left a simmering feud in Richmond Hill between Tories and Reformers that lasted a generation. A local meeting on October 15, 1838, to make statements for Lord Durham's Report ended in a brawl. On October 15, 1839, William Warren Baldwin and others attempted to hold a meeting to discuss Lord Durham's Report. Fence board-wielding Tories dispersed the meeting and one attendee, David Leppard, was killed. In the end, the Tories gained control of the political and culture life of Richmond Hill and maintained it for many years.

== Richmond Hill in the middle of the nineteenth century ==
The local preacher William Jenkins died in 1843. In 1847, the old log cabin schoolhouse of Richmond Hill Public School was replaced with a brick one. Reverend James Dick came to Richmond Hill in 1847 and took up a position as minister at the Richmond Hill Presbyterian Church. The same year Reverend Robert Campbell took up the same position at the still under construction Methodist Church. Both men were far more moderate than Jenkins, who had preached both political and religious radicalism. The community began to develop in earnest. The first Richmond Hill Spring Fair was sponsored by the Yonge Street Agricultural Society and held on May 24, 1849. Unlike most of the farming towns in the region, which developed around a main intersection, or "four corners", Richmond Hill began to stretch out along Yonge Street with no real downtown area. The little town had two to three hundred residents around this time, and in 1851 it boasted eight commercial stores, five inns, three blacksmiths, six woodworkers, three wagonmakers, a distiller and three doctors. Several Mills were located on creeks and streams nearby. In 1851, the first secondary school in Richmond Hill opened, the Richmond Hill Grammar School. Initial run in a private residence, the school obtained their own building in 1853, adjacent to the primary school. The Richmond Hill Library Association first met in December 1852, electing James Dick, the Presbyterian Minister as their president.

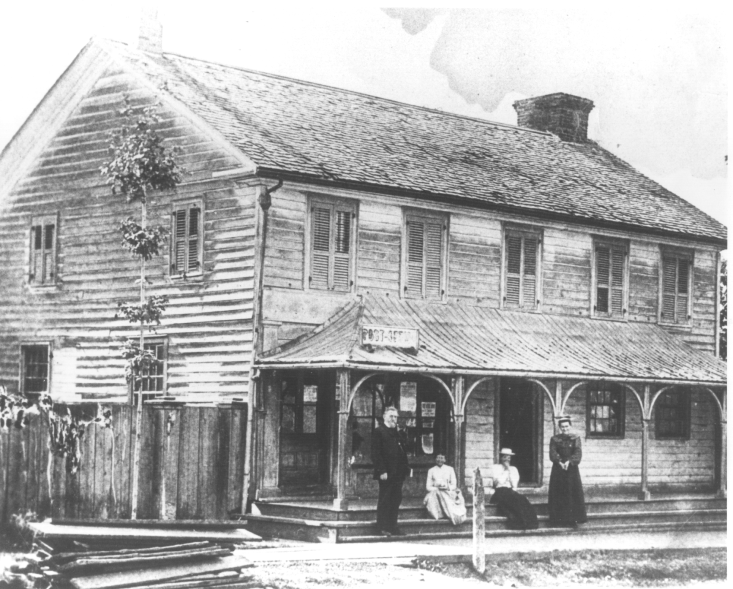
The Richmond Hill post office, with postmaster Matthew Teefy and his three daughters.

Through this time, travel up and down Yonge Street became increasingly important to the business of Richmond Hill. Inns and taverns opened and closed with some regularity. Richmond Hill found itself an ideal distance from Toronto, with the condition of Yonge Street meaning that travellers who departed from Toronto in the morning typically arrived in Richmond Hill hungry and looking for a rest. Continued attempts to improve the condition of Yonge Street through the area met with little success. The tolls collected on the road proved inadequate to even service the debt accumulated in its building. On May 16, 1853, the Ontario, Simcoe and Huron Railway opened a line from Toronto to Collingwood, which provided an alternate means of travelling north out of Toronto. Although it had a stop in Richmond Hill, the station was located some six kilometers east of Yonge Street on Major Mackenzie Drive, a long travel from the built-up area of Richmond Hill along the unpaved road. The ease of railway travel also impacted the traffic on Yonge Street. Between 1852 and 1854, the tolls collected on Yonge Street dropped twenty-six percent. Although this hurt business in town, there remained a need for stagecoaches, especially among local residents, and the post office in town provided reason to travel to Richmond Hill. Neighbouring communities like Langstaff Corners, Dollar, Headford, Oak Ridges, North Gormley and Temperanceville threatened to eclipse Richmond Hill, but none ever succeeded.

As the town continued to grow more and more businesses and institutions sprang up. A Roman Catholic church was opened in 1857. 1857 also saw the founding of the town's first newspaper, the York Ridings Gazette and Richmond Hill Advertiser which published its first edition on June 12, 1857. The newspaper reformed as the York Herald on March 25, 1859, due to financial pressures. An Anglican church opened in 1871.

== Richmond Hill incorporated ==
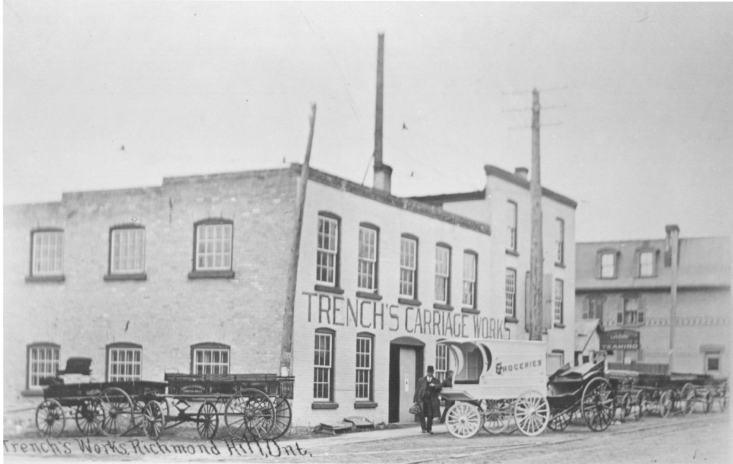
Trench's Carriage Works

In 1872, a movement to incorporate Richmond Hill as a village began to pick up steam, led by the York Herald. Previous attempts in 1853 and 1857 had failed, the first because Richmond Hill had less than half the needed 1000 people to qualify for incorporation under provincial law, and the latter because their inclusion of the Elgin Mills area to meet the 750 needed under newer legislation was felt to be "too expansionistic". The community at the time was split between Vaughan township west of Yonge Street, and Markham township east of Yonge Street. This division of the community made it hard for either township to effectively meet the needs of the community. The village of Richmond Hill was incorporated by act of the York County Council on June 18, 1872, coming into effect January 1, 1873. The boundaries of the new village were set at Markham-Vaughan Road (today's Major Mackenzie Drive) in the south, around today's Levendale Road in the north, just beyond Mill Pond in the east and the CNR tracks in the west. An election was held on January 6, 1873, to elect a reeve and four councillors. Abraham Law was elected the first reeve of Richmond Hill, in a campaign that centered on the need for a new high school. The new high school was built, and opened to students in November 1873.

The town continued to grow slowly after incorporation. One of the first services offered by the newly incorporated town was a fire department. On April 15, 1866, a large fire had destroyed four buildings in Richmond Hill and seriously damaged two others. After two less serious fires that year, a volunteer fire department had been organized. The town recognized the volunteer fire department, but tried not to interfere in their affairs. The volunteer fire department disbanded in 1877 when the town council refused to buy them a new fire engine. Richmond Hill founded its own fire department in 1880 which incorporated in 1881. The village purchased a second-hand fire truck for the department that year.

== Nineteenth century draws to a close ==
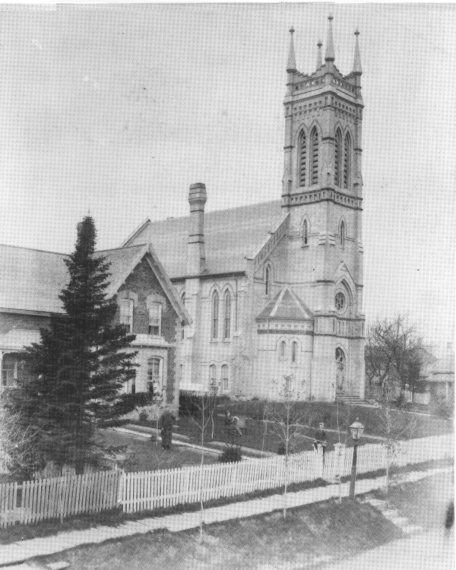
The Richmond Hill Presbyterian Church, with its preacher on the lawn of the adjacent home.

In the 1880s, the churches replaced the taverns as the centre of the social scene in Richmond Hill. An August 1881 edition of The Liberal remarked "Few villages of equal size or importance within the Province, have manifested so much activity and energy in church enterprise as our own." Richmond Hill in 1881 had a large Presbyterian church, adjacent to St Mary's Anglican Church. Across Yonge Street stood a Methodist church and a smaller Roman Catholic church was also found in Richmond Hill. An investigation by The Liberal found that over $25 000 had been spent on church projects in 1880 while Richmond Hill's population stood at less than one thousand souls.

On 21 December 1879 the Methodist church had burnt down. The congregation soon funded a new building which was opened in October 1881. The construction of this new church spurred the Presbyterians to also commission a new church to replace their old one that dated to 1821. Their new church opened May 24, 1881. The new churches had tall spires that dominated the skyline of Richmond Hill. The Anglicans responded in kind to this with the construction of their own spire to draw prestige to the church. The official "Town Bell" was moved from the Robin Hood Hotel to the new Methodist church in 1883, a reflection of their changing importances in the town. The parishioners at the more modest St. Mary Immaculate Roman Catholic Church built a new, larger building at Yonge Street and Dunlop Street in 1894. With this, the four large churches of Richmond Hill were the four largest buildings in Richmond Hill, defining its skyline.

The 1880s and 1890s were economically bad for Richmond Hill. The Patterson brothers firm, a manufacturing of farming implements and a major employer in Richmond Hill moved their operation to Woodstock after the town council there offered a $35 000 bonus if they would, which allowed their growing operation to construct a much needed rail spur. The Patterson brothers factory moved to Stratford in the winter of 1886/1887. The community experienced the economic decline that was occurring all across Ontario at the time, although perhaps not as strongly. The Trench Carriage Works and Newton Tanning Company remained major employers. The population declined, from 850 in 1890 to 650 in 1900. But many of the main stores along Yonge Street stayed open.

== Electric rail arrives ==
On November 19, 1896, the first electric train of the Metropolitan Street Railway Company arrived in Richmond Hill from Toronto. The line ran along Yonge Street from Toronto to Richmond Hill. The electric cars shortened the time to travel from Toronto's northern limit to Richmond Hill to forty-five minutes from the previous three-hour rides by stagecoach. The electric train brought immediate change to Richmond Hill. John Thompson's stagecoach line was soon out of business. Other businesses fared much better, with general trade going up thirty-five percent from 1896 to 1898. The electric rail line was quickly extended north, reaching Newmarket in 1899, but Richmond Hill was now connected to Toronto, with the Toronto World predicting Richmond Hill would become a suburb of Toronto, and The Liberal repeating their thoughts. The Metropolitan Street Railway Company bought some land adjacent to Bond Lake, then a short journey north of Richmond Hill. Bond lake was the first electric park (a park lit with electric lights) built in Ontario. The park featured a baseball diamond, a display pavilion and the lake for swimming, fishing and boating. It drew tourists to the area with its own stop on the Metropolitan Street Railway Company line.

In 1904, the Metropolitan Street Railway Company was acquired by the Toronto and York Radial Railway Company, which led to more tracks being laid across southern Ontario, and more trains passing through Richmond Hill. 1904 also saw the construction of a second railway through Richmond Hill. The James Bay Railway built a railway station in Richmond Hill on its line from Toronto to Sudbury. The new station Centre Street East was much closer to the centre of Richmond Hill. It opened in November 1906 and soon was the main route for shipping freight, although the electric line along Yonge Street remain the dominant method of passenger travel.

Richmond Hill made a deal with the Toronto and York Radial Railway Company in 1912 to buy electrical power from them as they were generating a surplus from their Bond Lake generator. The system was set into place and on December 30, 1912, the electric streetlights on Richmond Hill were lit up for the first time. Some commercial stores began using electric lighting that same day and the next. Other shops, factories and homes began to connect to the network.

== Greenhouse industry arrives ==
Industrial development of the core of Richmond Hill had not progressed during the first decade of the 20th century. The outlying areas of Lake Wilcox and Gormley were fast growing and welcoming new industries, and the Richmond Hill council set up a committee to encourage industries to locate in Richmond Hill. The first to do so was William Lawrence's greenhouse, which was constructed in the summer of 1912. Harold Mills built a greenhouse the same year. Lawrence was a Toronto florist and president of the Canadian Horticultural Society. Lawrence also persuaded fellow Toronto florist and former president of the Canadian Horticultural Society John Dunlap to build a greenhouse in Richmond Hill. Dunlop began a large flower-growing operation in Richmond Hill. In August 1913 he had two operation greenhouses and six more planned. Dunlop's roses quickly won acclaim. In March 1914 his roses were awarded first prize at the International Rose Show in New York City. In April 1916, his flowers garnered three first places and two second places at the National Flower Show in Philadelphia.

The greenhouse industry in Richmond Hill was competitive but friendly. The various greenhouses often worked together to fill large orders. Together with interested local residents they founded the Richmond Hill Horticultural Society in April 1914. The society worked to both increase local interest in fruit, vegetable and flower growing, and to enhance the town's aesthetics. They planted trees on village property and awarded prizes to local residents for their flower gardens.

== The Great War ==
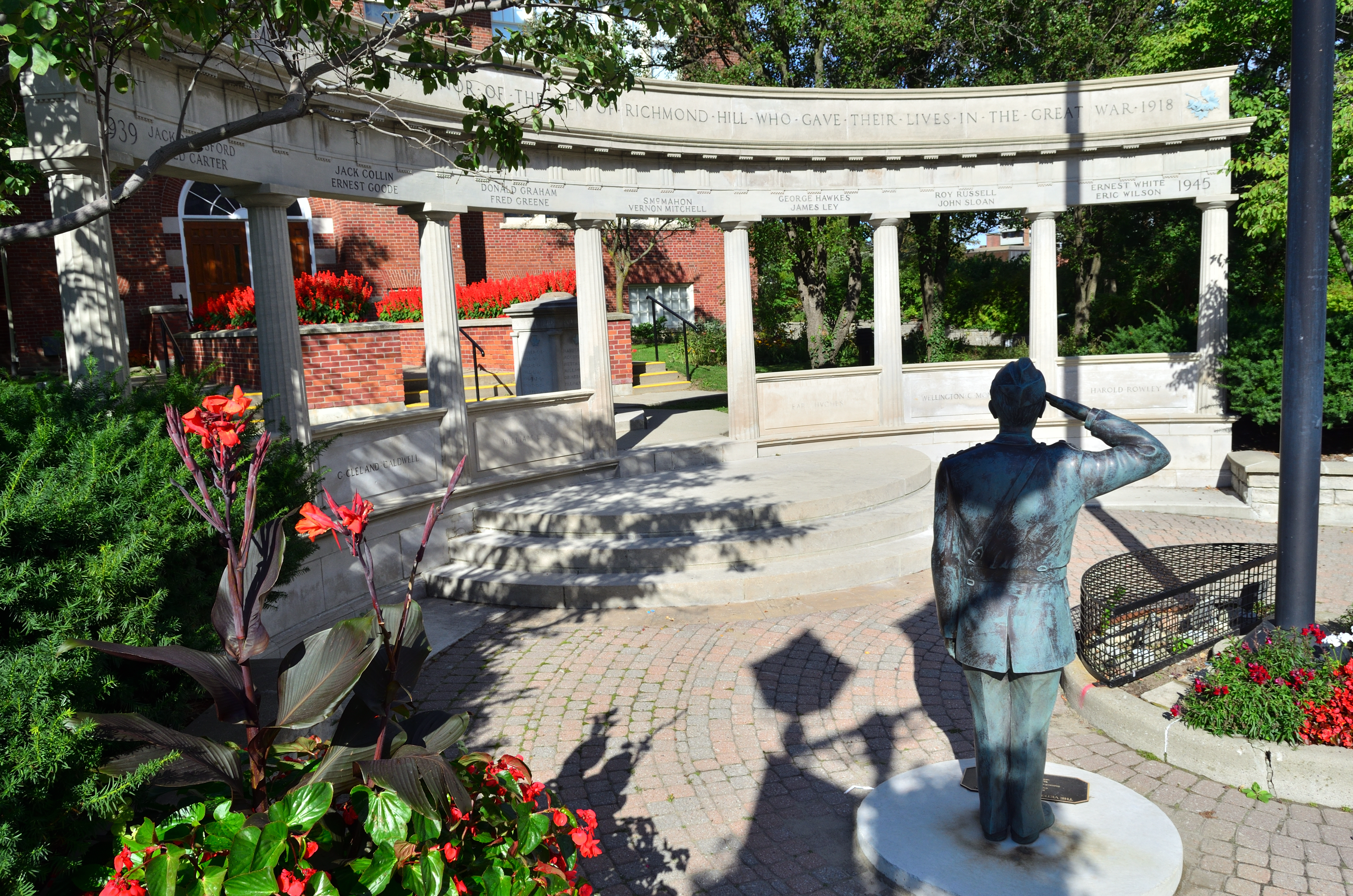
A cenotaph in Richmond Hill.

The Richmond Hill Women's Institute's was formed on January 27, 1913, holding their first meeting in the masonic hall. Their meetings usually focused on domestic matters, but they did support the "Votes for Women" campaigns run by the national and provincial women's institutes, and help establish local women in more prominent places in society. Their efforts put two women on the village's Fair Board in 1917. The first woman elected to any position in Richmond Hill was Mrs. O.L. Wright, a member of the Women's Institute elected to the Richmond Hill School Board as a trustee in 1932.

The onset of World War I also pushed women into leading roles in the community. Eighty-nine men from Richmond Hill served in Canada's armed forces. Six men from Richmond Hill would be killed. The absent men opened many opportunities for women in the workforce, the volunteer agencies and areas of public service.

With the blossoming of the flower industry, the city's population began to rise rapidly. New homes were being built, with The Liberal counting 27 new homes in 1918. Williams Lawrence sold the unused parts of his greenhouse property as lots and began developing the subdivision of Roseview Gardens, around Roseview Avenue and Major Mackenzie Drive.

The village council hired local carriage maker William Ashford Wright to design a crest for Richmond Hill in 1919. Wright patterned his designed after the 4th Duke of Richmond's crest, and included his motto as well: "En la Rose Je Fleuris", French for "Like the Rose, I flourish", which the town retains.

== The Roaring 20s ==
The 1920s were a time of growth and prosperity in Richmond Hill. In 1921 Richmond Hill built a pumping station and a water tower on Mill Pond to supply the city with public water. The Orange Home, a boarding school, opened on Yonge Street on July 2, 1923. Run by the Orange lodge, the building contained dormitory rooms, a chapel, an infirmary, a dining hall, lounges, and three classrooms. The school would soon house 150 children. The growing population, combined with the elimination of tuition fees in the 1920s led to increased enrollment in Richmond Hill High School, which moved to a new building on December 5, 1924, on the site of the modern building.

In 1924, the volunteer fire department was replaced by a semi-professional force, headed by Harold Mills. The town purchased a motorised fire truck for the brigade, and Mills hired many of the men in his greenhouses to be firemen.

== Great Depression ==
The collapse of the stock market in 1929 and the ensuing depression changed the economic and social direction of Richmond Hill. Construction of new homes and workplaces stopped and municipal affairs turned strongly towards dealing with the unemployed and the homeless. Make work projects were begun, such as a water main extension along Benson Avenue. Salaries of civic employees were cut by ten percent in January 1932. Teachers of the Richmond Hill Board of Education saw their salaries cut five percent in May 1932, and principals eight percent.

The village of Richmond Hill, together with North York, Markham and Vaughan purchased the radial railway run by the Toronto Transit Commission along Yonge Street in 1930, after the transit commission had planned to close the line due to sagging ridership. The service was renamed North Yonge Railways.

The Rose business remained successful through the 1930s, however. Four large greenhouse companies operated in Richmond Hill during the 1930s: H.J. Mills' greenhouses, Richmond Roses John H. Dunlop's greenhouses and Bedford Park greenhouses. The greenhouse rose growing business was labour-intensive, but sales also stayed high through the depression. John H. Dunlop's greenhouses were purchased by H.J. Mills in April 1934, consolidating the rose business in three companies.

The David Dunlap Observatory was opened in May 1935. The observatory housed the world's second-largest telescope at the time, surpassed only by the Mount Wilson Observatory in collecting area. The cost of the observatory was $500 000 and was funded by Jessie Donalda Dunlap, the widow of David A. Dunlap. The telescope was run by the University of Toronto, and was used for spectra until the mid-1980s, but due to light pollution, its abilities have been reduced and is no longer used for scientific research. It is now operated by the Royal Astronomical Society Of Canada for educational purposes.

The Richmond Hill Lions Club was formed in April 1938. Their main activity was serving the needs of the poor. They provided people on relief with food and clothing, such as milk and cod liver oil to poor children. They organised annual street dances to raise funds for the medical needs of impoverished children.

== World War II ==
The local chapter of the Red Cross had been disbanded after World War I, but reformed on September 8, 1939, two days before Canada declared war on Germany. Around 150 men from Richmond Hill served in Canada's armed forces during World War II. The first resident of Richmond Hill killed in battle was Sergeant Gunner Don Graham, for whom flags in Richmond Hill were flown at half mast on July 10, 1941. With many men overseas, manpower shortages on farms became so severe that local businessmen and professionals formed groups know colloquially as "Commandos" and volunteered time to work on farms.

Support for the war effort ran high in Richmond Hill. In the April 27, 1942 plebiscite on conscription six hundred eighteen voters were in favour of conscription, while only twenty-three were opposed. Various social organisations in Richmond Hill garnered donations for the war effort. School children trick or treating on Halloween collected change for the war effort, rather than candy.

== Post-war growth ==
A new six hundred person movie theatre opened in Richmond Hill in 1948, named The Richmond. The same year a drastic shortage of hydroelectric power in Ontario forced the rationing of power to municipalities. The North Yonge railways consumed huge amounts of power, so the trains were temporarily replaced with diesel-burning buses, starting October 10, 1948. Although a local outcry arose over the buses, once in operation they proved popular and profitable, with ridership in the first quarter of 1949 up 128 000 riders over the previous year. A vote in September 1949 did away with the old railway, which was sold off. Richmond Hill's first catholic school opened in 1948, adjacent to St. Mary's Roman Catholic Church. Some sixty students were in attendance during its first year of operation.

The Richmond Hill Business Men's Association was formed, and held its first meeting in February 1950. The village grew fast through the 1950s. On 1 January 1953 Richmond Hill annexed some 1,000 acres (4 km^{2}) of land from Markham Township, tripling the village's size, and increasing the population from 2300 to 3300. The village's new boundaries extended to Bayview Avenue in the east, Elgin Mills Road in the north and Harding Boulevard in the south. In 1954, the village council took an important step towards Richmond Hill's growth. The council approved the construction of subdivisions, in which the homebuilder would be responsible for paving roads, providing sewage and water hookups and paying the municipality $300 towards to construction of new schools for each home built. This enable the rapid building of new homes. In the summer and fall of 1954, four new subdivisions were built in Richmond Hill, at Richmond Acres, Pleasantville, Tyndall and Glenbrae. This growth triggered the construction of a new municipal structure, and the establishment of a separate police force for Richmond Hill. During the 1950s, some five new elementary schools opened in Richmond Hill in response to the population growth.

Richmond Hill annexed a second parcel of land in 1956, 35 acres (140,000 m^{2}) of Vaughan Township covering Richmond Heights. In September 1956, the Ontario Municipal Board approved its elevation to Town status, effective January 1, 1957. 1957 also saw the opening of Richmond Hill's first radio station, CJRH. In 1958, a branch of the Victorian Order of Nurses was set up in Richmond Hill to provide home nursing service. The same year the Richmond Hill Senior Citizen's Club was formed. An additional 30 acres (120,000 m^{2}) of Vaughan Township, just north of Richmond Heights, were annexed in February 1959.

== A community in bloom ==
The first woman to serve on the Richmond Hill Town Council, Margaret Southwell, began her term in 1960. Bayview Secondary School opened in 1960, providing Richmond Hill with a second high school. Richmond Hill Transit was established in 1960, bringing public transit service to the town. Construction began on Richmond Hill's first hospital, named York Central Hospital in 1961. The hospital opened on November 28, 1963, under the directorship of James Langstaff. The 1960s also saw the opening of many recreation facilities Richmond Hill was lacking after the rapid growth of the 1950s. Several new public parks were opened in the 1960s, and Richmond Hill's first public pool, dubbed Centennial Pool after Canada's Centennial, was opened in June 1965. In 1968, the town expanded its borders again, annexing 310 acres (1.3 km^{2}) north of Elgin Mills Road. The problematic lack of recreation facilities continued however. The town's Social Planning Council convened in April 1968 and blamed increasing youth vandalism, drug use and truancy on the town's lack of recreation facilities. Social Planning Council member Pierre Burton was quoted as saying: "All we insist on are paved roads and sewers ... no one cares about a community hall or swimming pool or any other kind of recreation for adults or children." The same year, a new large ice rink was opened. The next year the town opened its first day care facility at the urging of the Social Planning Council and local women like Helen Sawyer Hogg who publicly spoke about the lack of such facilities holding back professional women. 1969 also saw the town's first winter carnival, held at Mill Pond.

Richmond Hill's explosive growth continued during the 1990s, fueled in significant part by immigration. In the early 90s, Statistics Canada named Richmond Hill as Canada's fastest-growing community.

On March 25, 2019, the Richmond Hill Town Council passed a motion to change the title of Richmond Hill from 'town' to 'city'.

== See also ==
- Richmond Hill, Ontario
