= James Langstaff =

James Langstaff may refer to:

- James Miles Langstaff (1825–1889), reeve of Richmond Hill, Ontario
- James Langstaff (bishop) (born 1956), Bishop of Rochester

== See also ==
- Langstaff (disambiguation)
