= Richard Ball =

Richard Ball may refer to:

- Richard Ball (Australian politician) (1857–1937)
- Richard Ball (cyclist) (born 1944), American Olympic cyclist
- Richard Ball (Michigan politician) (1932–2019), Michigan politician
- Ricky Ball, musician
- Sir Richard Ball, 5th Baronet of the Ball baronets (born 1953)
- Richard Amos Ball (1845–1925), British Methodist minister in Canada

== See also ==
- Rick Ball, Canadian sportscaster
- Ball (surname)
