= Richmond Hill High School (Ontario) =

Location
- 201 Yorkland Street; York Region; Richmond Hill, Ontario, L4S 1A2; Canada; 43°54′11″N 79°26′21″W

Information
- School type: Public High school
- Motto: Sapere Aude (Latin, variously translated as: 'Dare to Learn', 'Dare to Know', 'Dare to be Wise', 'Have the courage to think for yourself' or 'Have courage to use your own reason')
- Founded: 1851; 175 years ago
- Founders: Abraham Law; William Clark
- School board: York Region District School Board
- Superintendent: Rita Russo
- Area trustee: Simon Cui
- School number: 938106
- Principal: Krista Luks
- Staff: 111
- Grades: 9-12
- Enrollment: 1635 (May 2025)
- Language: English
- Schedule: 8:50 a.m. — 3:30 p.m.
- Area: 180,174 sq ft (16,738.7 m2)
- Student Council: Richmond Hill High School Student Council (RHHSSC)
- Colours: Forest Green & White
- Song: Hail to Richmond Hill
- Mascot: Raider
- Team name: Richmond Hill Raiders
- Newspaper: The Spyglass
- Website: www.richmondhill.hs.yrdsb.edu.on.ca
- Last updated: November 2025

Richmond Hill High School (RHHS) is a secondary school located in the city of Richmond Hill, Ontario, Canada. It is the second-oldest high school in York Region Municipality (behind Newmarket High School c. 1843), being established in the mid-19th century. The school is a host to several regional special education programs, including an Advanced Placement Program, Alternative Education Program, Cooperative Education Program, Developmentally-Delayed Program, Multiple Exceptionalities Program, and a gifted program.

In the 2024–2025 Fraser Institute rankings, Richmond Hill High School ranked 28th in the province of Ontario, with an overall score of 8.8/10.

== History ==
Richmond Hill High School is one of the oldest secondary schools in the Greater Toronto Area.

=== 19th Century Iterations ===
The first Grammar School in Richmond Hill was founded on December 2, 1851, in a room of a store at Yonge and Richmond Streets, donated by Abraham Law, Two years later, a purpose-built wooden structure was built to house the community's secondary school and the institution adopted a curriculum consisting of Latin, Greek, French, Euclid, Algebra, Arithmetic and History. After the incorporation of the town of Richmond Hill, a larger, brick-built structure became home to the school in 1872, but it suffered a catastrophic fire and was replaced with a still larger building in 1897, at a cost of $3,000 (equivalent to approximately $120,000 in 2026). The 1897 building, at Yonge and Wright Streets, is still standing, and is the home of Covernotes Coffeehouse in 2026..

=== Wright Street ===
In 1924, the school moved once again, to a new building at 51 Wright Street. R.H.H.S.' new home was constructed at a cost of $95,000 (equivalent to approximately $1,741,000 in 2026), a substantial sum for the time.. In 1948, the management of the school passed to the York County School Board, and became the region's central high school, hosting students from Vaughan, Markham and Woodbridge, in addition to Richmond Hill. In 1950, a substantial addition was built onto the west side of the Wright Street building, and a second wing was added to the east side of the school sometime later. R.H.H.S. operated from that location until the end of the 1999 - 2000 school year..

The 51 Wright Street building has continued to serve as an academic institution since being vacated by R.H.H.S., having passed through multiple owner/operators, it is presently (as of June 2026) operating as SCV École secondaire Norval-Morrisseau French secondary school.

=== Present, Yorkland Street Location ===
In September 2000, the school moved to its present location at 201 Yorkland Street.

During the 1948 - 1949 school year, the Richmond Hill High School Literary Society erected a bronze plaque honouring the twenty-two former students of the school who died in service during the First and Second World Wars, listing each of their names. The plaque is now mounted on the east wall between the outer and inner doors of the main entrance of the school.

In 2005, former State President of South Africa and 1993 Nobel Peace Prize Winner, F. W. de Klerk, visited the school and spoke to students and staff about his part in the end of the apartheid system. He also answered students' questions during an hour-long session.

== Building and site ==
The current school building on Yorkland Street is a two-story structure measuring 180,174 square feet (16,738.7 m^{2}), which was completed and opened in 2000. It houses two gymnasiums, a fitness and weight training room, a cafetorium including a stage, a library, a communications technology room including a green and blue screen, vocal and instrumental/band music rooms, two visual art studio classroom/workspaces and six 'pods' with a central computer lab surrounded by four conventional classrooms, a science lab classroom and two teaching staff workrooms/offices.

The present Yorkland Street building was built to accommodate a student population of 1400 students, however, due to continued residential building in the school's catchment area and the strength of the school's academic reputation, the school has consistently enrolled 1600+ students since shortly after its opening. This has necessitated the use of portables as classrooms, with the number of portables growing to as many as eleven, but reduced to nine in the spring of 2026.

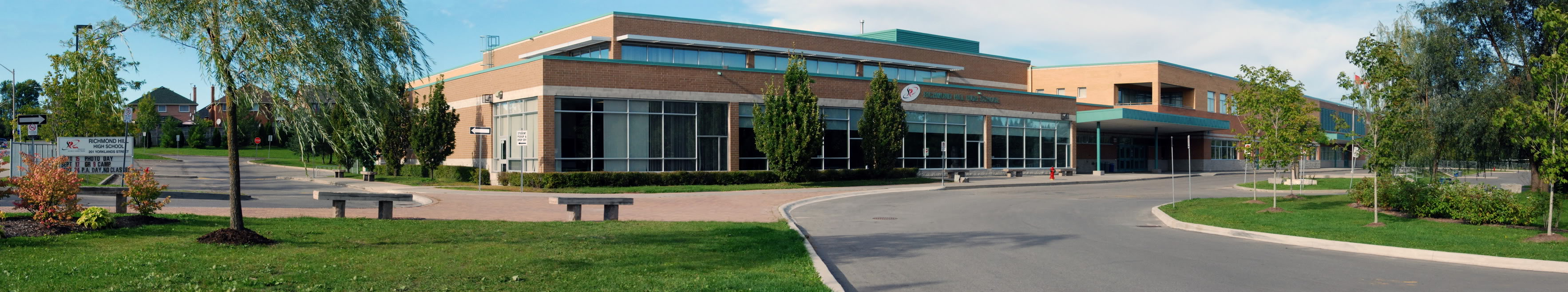
Panorama of the school's front entrance

=== 'Books' by E.B. Cox ===
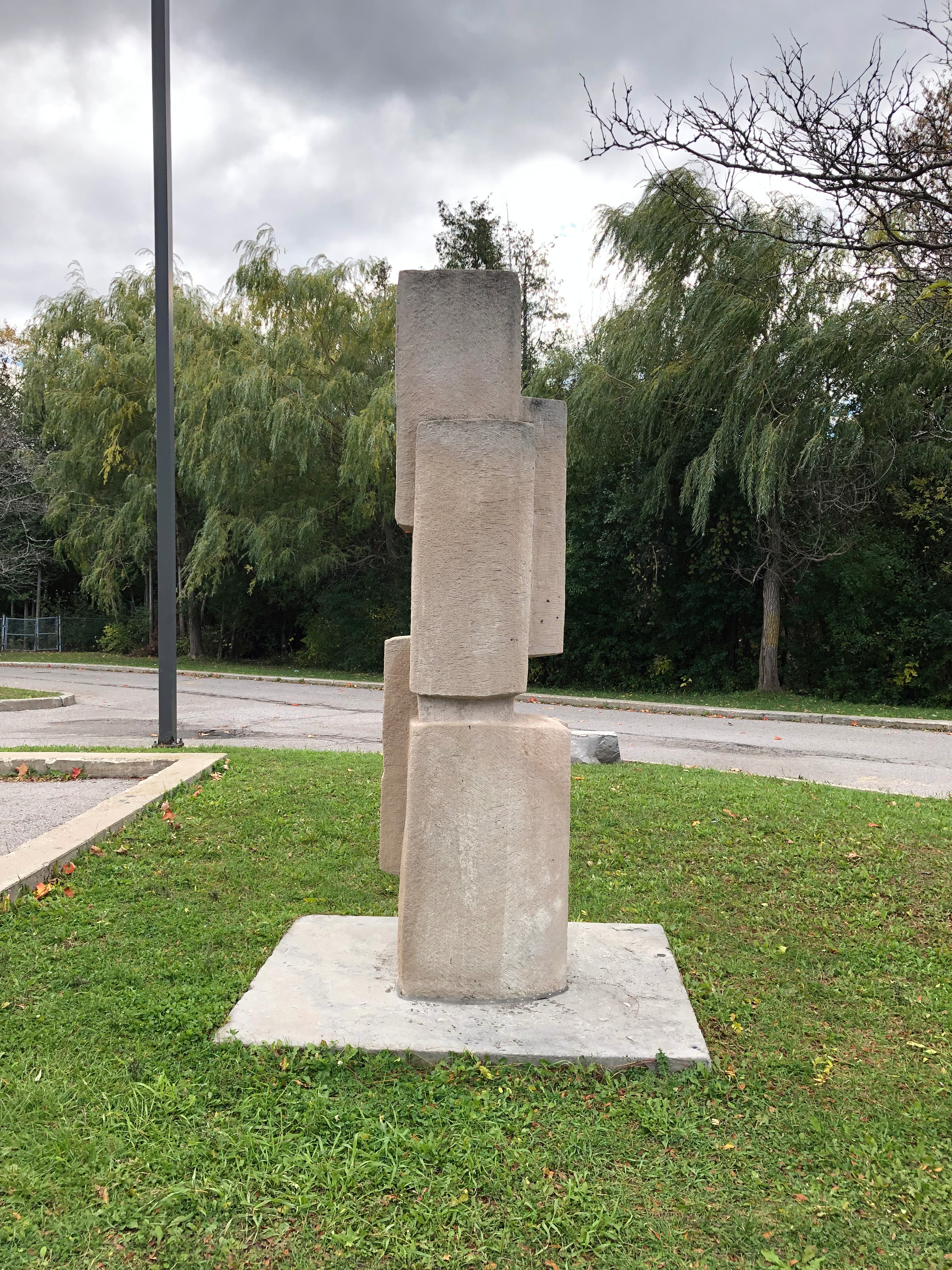
'Books' seen near the front entrance of the school.

Situated in front of the main entrance of the present Yorkland Street building, in the grass median between the incoming and outbound driveways, is a sculpture entitled "Books" created by renowned Canadian sculptor E.B. Cox. In 1967, the staff and students of the school raised $4,000 (equivalent to over $37,000 in 2026) to commission the piece as a commemoration of the 100ᵗʰ anniversary of Canadian Confederation. It was originally installed at the Wright Street location upon its completion in 1968, and was moved to Yorkland Street when the school moved in 2000. The sculpture is meant to represent a column of books towering up to the sky, representing the importance of books as a tool of learning.

== Notable alumni ==
- Elan Bibas, contestant on Love Island (American TV series) season 7.
- Josh Binstock, Olympic volleyball player.
- Evan Fong, YouTube gaming celebrity and musician also known as VanossGaming.
- Michelle Li, Olympic badminton player.
- Farley Mowat, World War II veteran, conservationist, and author.
- Mag Ruffman, comedian, actress, and television host.
- Wendy Shon (Seung-Wan 'Wendy' Shon), singer and member of South Korean K-pop girl group Red Velvet.
- R. H. Thomson, actor and filmmaker.
- Norman J. Wildberger, mathematics professor at UNSW.
- Samantha Win Tjhia, Olympic Wushu fighter, stunt double and actress.
- Kathleen Wynne, Former Premier of Ontario.
- Brian Yang, Canadian Olympic badminton player.

== See also ==
- List of high schools in Ontario
- York Region District School Board
- Richmond Hill, Ontario
- Advanced Placement
- History Of Richmond Hill, Ontario
