= Susannah Maxwell =

African-Canadian centenarian (1805–1923)

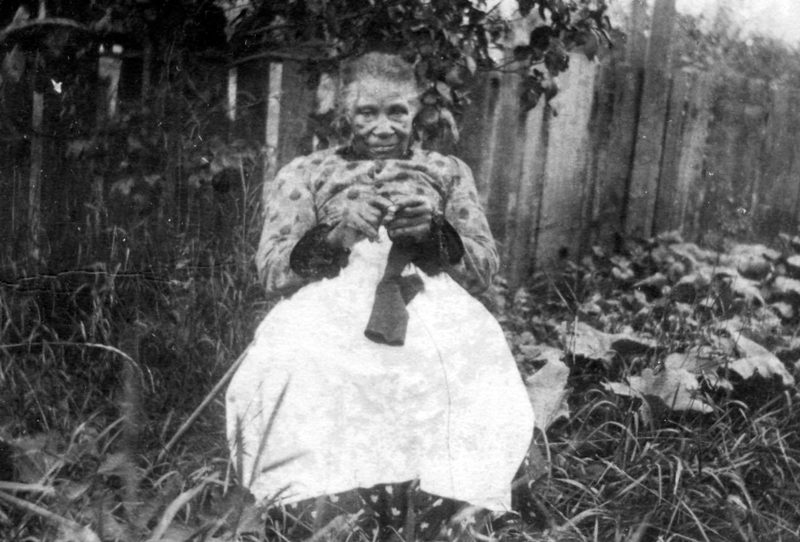
Susannah Maxwell, c. 1880s.

Susannah Augusta Maxwell (née Stokes; 10 March 1805 – 11 February 1923) was a prominent Black citizen of Richmond Hill, Ontario, Canada, in the 19th and early 20th centuries.

== Early life ==
Maxwell was born in Pennsylvania in 1805 to free Black parents, but orphaned at a young age. She became an indentured servant to a white family, who apparently provided some education as she learned to read and write. According to a Globe article from 1901, she was under the guardianship of Mr. Harper, who was a landowner of several acres of land. It was here where she learned to read, sew and knit, and was given instructions for household duties.

== Life in Pennsylvania, resistance against slave-catchers ==
At the age of eighteen, she gained her independence. Sources mention that the family treated her fairly well and sent her to school. Two years later, she married Henry Maxwell and the couple established a household in Lancaster County, possibly in Christiana. The couple had five children together.

In Pennsylvania, slavery almost died out and the state was becoming a haven for runaway enslaved people from the South. However, due to the passage of the Fugitive Slave Act in 1850, there were many slave-hunters who wanted the authority to recapture any runaway enslaved people. Some slave-catchers had also kidnapped free blacks and dark skinned whites. Around September, Susannah's village was invaded by slave-catchers. The Maxwells and others in the village resisted against them. With this incident, Edward Gorsuch and his gang had attempted recapture his runaway slaves, Noah Baley, Nelson Ford, George Hammond, and Joshua Hammond. This led to Gorsuch's death as others part of the Christina Resistance fought against him. Ultimately, the family was forced to flee Pennsylvania after the Christiana Riot of September 11, 1851. The influx of bounty hunters, encouraged by the Fugitive Slave Act of 1850, made it unsafe for Black residents to remain. Due to the aftermath, Black residents fled through the Underground Railroad and lived in New York. Susannah's name was not mentioned in the documentation of this resistance. However, her presence in the village that was invaded, and resisted, and her flight from Pennsylvania corroborates the narrative of where many fled, due to fear of imprisonment.

== In Canada ==
In 1855 the Maxwell family was living in New York State (where her daughter Charlotte Matilda (Tillie) was born) and by 1858 they had arrived in Upper Canada via the Underground Railroad, spending some time in Toronto. However, it became apparent that finding work was difficult after living in Toronto for a few years.

In 1871 they moved to Richmond Hill, north of Toronto, and were one of very few, if not the only, Black families in the town. Henry worked as a stoker and Susannah, along with two of her daughters, operated a laundry business from their home. One story tells of Maxwell walking 7 miles (11 km) to work in Markham, where wages were higher, and falling unconscious in a snow storm on her return journey. She was found by a dog who alerted nearby residents who saved her. Her husband died soon after they moved to Richmond Hill. In Richmond Hill at the time, the Maxwell family were the only African descent.

Maxwell was active in the local Presbyterian Church. According to a census from 1871, she was noted as a Wesleyan Methodist but later sources suggest her as a Presbyterian. The Presbyterian Church on Yonge Street was opposite her home and she was active in the church affairs.

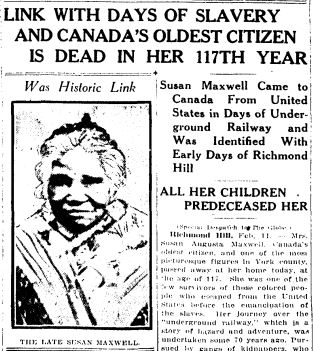
Maxwell's obituary published on page 1 of the Globe.

== Longevity and death ==
She survived her husband and all five of her children. At the time of her death in 1923 she was reported to be Canada's oldest citizen. Her funeral was conducted by Richard Amos Ball, a minister of the British Methodist Episcopal Church church and the son of fugitive slaves who had also used the Underground Railroad to reach Canada.
