= Langstaff =

Langstaff could mean one of the following:

== Places ==
=== Ontario, Canada ===
- Langstaff, Ontario, a community shared between Vaughan, Ontario and Markham, Ontario
  - Langstaff GO Station, a station in the GO Transit network located in the community
  - York Regional Road 72, known commonly as Langstaff Road Back in 1966.

== Schools ==
- Langstaff Secondary School, a public high school in Richmond Hill, Ontario, Canada

== People ==
- Annie MacDonald Langstaff (1887–1975), Canadian legal activist, supporter of women's suffrage and early aviator
- Brian Langstaff (born 1948), British judge
- James Henry Langstaff (born 1956), British Anglican priest, Bishop of Lynn 2004–2010, Bishop of Rochester 2010–2021
- James Miles Langstaff (1825–1889), reeve of Richmond Hill, Ontario
- John Langstaff (1920–2005), American baritone singer
- Macaulay Langstaff (born 1997), English footballer
- Sarah Josephine Meredith Langstaff (1849–1933), Canadian-American socialite and society founder
- Stuart Langstaff, Green Party candidate in 2004 Canadian federal election

== See also ==
- Longstaff (disambiguation)
