= William Trench =

William Trench may refer to:

- William Trench, 1st Earl of Clancarty (1741–1805), Anglo-Irish aristocrat and politician
- William Trench, 3rd Earl of Clancarty (1803–1872), Irish nobleman
- William Trench III (1831–1896), reeve of Richmond Hill, Ontario
- William Le Poer Trench (1837–1920), Anglo-Irish politician and British army officer
