= Pugsley =

Pugsley is a surname. Notable people with the surname include:

- Albert Pugsley (1910–2002)
- Andrew Pugsley (born 1978)
- Charles W. Pugsley (1878–1940), American educator and government official
- Christopher Pugsley, New Zealand military historian
- Cornelius Amory Pugsley (1850–1936)
- Jacob J. Pugsley (1838–1920), American republican representative
- John Pugsley (1934–2011)
- Joseph Pugsley (1885–1976)
- William H. Pugsley (1851–1933)
- William Pugsley (1850–1925)
- Rear-Admiral Anthony Follett Pugsley (1901-1990)

== See also ==
- Pugsley Addams, character in Addams family
- Pugsley's Creek, tributary of Westchester Creek
