= Agricultural society =

An agricultural society may refer to:

== Organisations ==
- New York State Agricultural Society, in New York State, United States
- Odiham Agricultural Society, in Odiham, Hampshire, England
- Royal Agricultural Society (disambiguation), a number of organisations of this name
- Yonge Street Agricultural Society, a former Canadian society
- Yorkshire Agricultural Society, a charity in Yorkshire, England

== Other uses ==
- An agrarian society, one where the chief occupation is agriculture

== See also ==
- Krishibid Institution Bangladesh, formerly Bangladesh Agriculturalist Association, Dhaka
