= Royal Agricultural Society =

Royal Agricultural Society can refer to:

- Royal Agricultural Society of England
- Royal Agricultural Society of New South Wales
- Royal Agricultural and Horticultural Society of South Australia
- Royal Agricultural Society of Tasmania
- Royal Agricultural Society of Victoria
- Royal Agricultural Society of Western Australia

== See also ==
- Agricultural society (disambiguation)
