= Longstaff =

Longstaff is a surname, and may refer to:

== People ==
- Abie Longstaff, Australian children's book author
- Bert Longstaff (1885–1970), English football player for Brighton & Hove Albion
- David Longstaff (born 1974), British ice hockey player and father of Matty and Sean
- Ellis Longstaff (born 2002), rugby league footballer
- Francis Longstaff (born 1956), American educator
- Fred Longstaff (c. 1890–1916), English rugby league footballer
- Frederick Longstaff (1879–1961), Anglo-Canadian soldier, architect, and mountaineer
- George Longstaff (c. 1947–2003), British bicycle and tricycle builder
- George Blundell Longstaff (1849–1921), British civil activist
- George W. Longstaff (1850–1901), American architect
- Jane Longstaff (1855–1935), British malacologist
- Sir John Longstaff (1861–1941), Australian painter and war artist
- Johnny Longstaff (fl. 1930s), English anti-fascist activist
- Josh Longstaff (born 1982), American basketball coach
- Llewellyn W. Longstaff (1841–1918), English industrialist
- Luis Longstaff (born 2001), English footballer
- Marion L. Longstaff (1904–1984), American politician
- Matty Longstaff (born 2000), English footballer and son of David Longstaff
- Moorea Longstaff, Canadian para-swimmer
- Ronald Earl Longstaff (born 1941), United States federal judge
- Sean Longstaff (born 1997), English footballer, son of David Longstaff
- Shaun Longstaff (born 1972), rugby union player for Scotland
- Suzie Longstaff, (born 1969), British teacher and rower
- Tom Longstaff, (1875–1964 ), English doctor, explorer and mountaineer
- Captain Will Longstaff (1879–1953), Australian painter and war artist

== See also ==
- Longstaff Peaks, Antarctica
- various weapons including the Gun used in Chinese martial arts
- Langstaff (disambiguation)
