= John Brown (Richmond Hill politician) =

Canadian politician, mayor 1883–1884

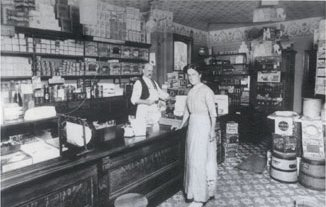
John Brown, serving a customer in his grocery store.

John Brown was the reeve of Richmond Hill, Ontario, Canada from 1883 to 1884. He also server as a councillor on the Richmond Hill Village Council in 1874.

Brown opened a grocery store in Richmond Hill in 1872. In 1873, the village council appointed Brown a license inspector. He was elected to the village council as a councillor in 1874, serving for one year. He was elected reeve of Richmond Hill in 1883, and again in 1884.

He closed his grocery store in 1884.
