= Richmond Hill City Council =

Government of Richmond Hill, Ontario

Richmond Hill City Council is the governing body for the Canadian city of Richmond Hill, Ontario. Council serves a four-year term, after which a new council is elected by qualified electors in Richmond Hill. Richmond Hill City Council consists of a Mayor, six Ward Councillors and two Regional and Local Councillors. The mayor and the regional and local councillors additionally serve on the York Regional Council representing the interests of the residents of Richmond Hill.

The mayor serves as the leader of council, presiding over meetings to maintain order, and calling special meetings when needed. The mayor and councillors both propose, oversee the administration and finances of Richmond Hill and direction the operations of the city's departments, as well as meeting with residents and government agencies to discuss issues relevant to Richmond Hill and its residents.

== Current council (2022-2026) ==
Position	Councillor	Communities
Mayor	David West	At-large
Regional & Local/ Deputy Mayor	Godwin Chan	At-large
Regional & Local	Joe DiPaola	At-large
Ward 1	Carol Davidson	Oak Ridges
Ward 2	Scott Thompson	Devonsleigh, Crosby
Ward 3	Castro Liu	Rouge Woods, Bayview Hill
Ward 4	Simon Cui	Jefferson, Westbrook, Mill Pond
Ward 5	Karen Cilevitz	Yongehurst, Richvale, Beverley Acres
Ward 6	Micheal Shiu	Observatory, Bayview Glen, Doncrest

Dave Barrow was elected mayor in 2018 but in September 2021, he announced that he would be leaving the position. Deputy mayor Joe Di Paola served as acting mayor after Barrow's resignation until a by-election could be held to elect a permanent replacement. Ward 4 councillor David West won the by-election held from January 18-24th, 2022 and he was sworn in as mayor the following day. Raika Sheppard was appointed by council to fill the vacancy of West's former seat until November 14, 2022.

== Municipal departments ==
City Council oversees the municipal departments, which deliver a variety of services to the residents of Richmond Hill. The city has a Community Services Department, Corporate & Financial Services Department, Environment & Infrastructure Services Department, Office of the Chief Administrative Officer and Planning & Regulatory Services Department.

The city’s Corporate & Financial Services Department is responsible for providing direction, policy advice and leadership to and through the Financial Services, Information Technology and City Clerk’s Divisions. It provides expert financial, administrative and technical services to ensure supports are in place for internal and external clients and partners.

The Environment & Infrastructure Services Department oversees the design, construction and overall management of the City’s municipal infrastructure and environmental programs. The Department has a strategic focus on the direction and management of environmental services and initiatives that support future needs and interests of the community. The integration of all design and construction projects for facilities, parks, roads, water, stormwater and wastewater infrastructure resides in this Department.

The Chief Administrative Office provides Corporate leadership in the overall management of the City's five departments. In this role, the Chief Administrative Officer reviews and approves all recommendations made to Council and Committees of Council, and manages corporate strategic planning. The Chief Administrative Officer acts as department head to the Legal Division, Human Resources and the Office of Strategic Initiatives.

The Community Services Department delivers the integrated front line services required to provide for an active, attractive, safe and connected community. The department includes Fire & Emergency Services, Parks Operations, Public Works Operations and Recreation & Culture. The Community Services Department is responsible for delivering Fire & Emergency Services programs, maintaining parks, road repair and replacement, garbage & recycling programs, operation of the City's water & wastewater infrastructure, delivery of recreational & cultural programs and managing the city's recreational facilities. The department also runs special events, such as Concerts in the Park and The Reel Thing, a local film festival.

The Community Services Department also runs the Richmond Hill Centre for the Performing Arts.

The Planning & Regulatory Services Department provides Planning and Building related services to Council, other departments and the general public. Each division within the department has responsibility for various stages and aspects of land development and construction of buildings, as well as the administration of various City by-laws. It responds to the specific needs of Council, the public and the development industry.

== History ==
Richmond Hill was incorporated as a village in 1873, and the village council consisted of a reeve and four village councillors. The councillors were the top four vote-getters of all persons running for the job. The reeve and councillors served one-year terms. Richmond Hill was incorporated as a town in 1957, and the town council was expanded to include a mayor, a reeve, a deputy reeve and four town councillors. In 1966, the council began to serve two-year terms, rather than the previous one-year terms. The council was reorganised in 1971 after the incorporation of York Region to have a mayor, two regional councillors shared with York Region Council, and six town councillors. 1970 had also seen Richmond Hill expand from 1,700 acres (6.9 km^{2}) to 27,000 acres (110 km^{2}) and from 19000 residents to 34000 residents with the annexation of land from Whitchurch Township, Markham Township, Vaughan Township and King Township. In 1982, the terms of councillors were extended to three years, and in 2006 the terms were extended to four years. In March 2019, Richmond Hill was designated a city.

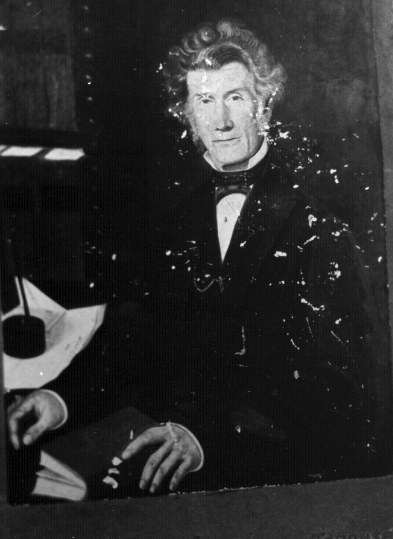
Abraham Law, the first reeve of Richmond Hill

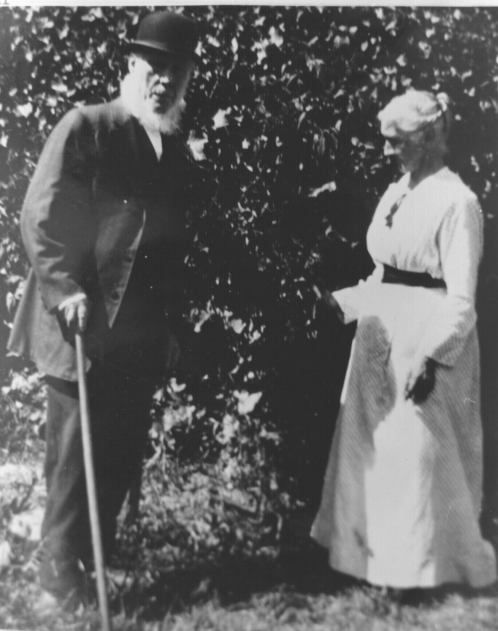
William Harrison and wife. Harrison was the reeve in 1874

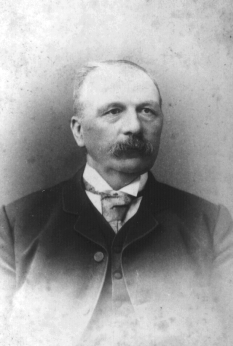
William Trench III, reeve from 1875 - 1879 and 1881 - 1882

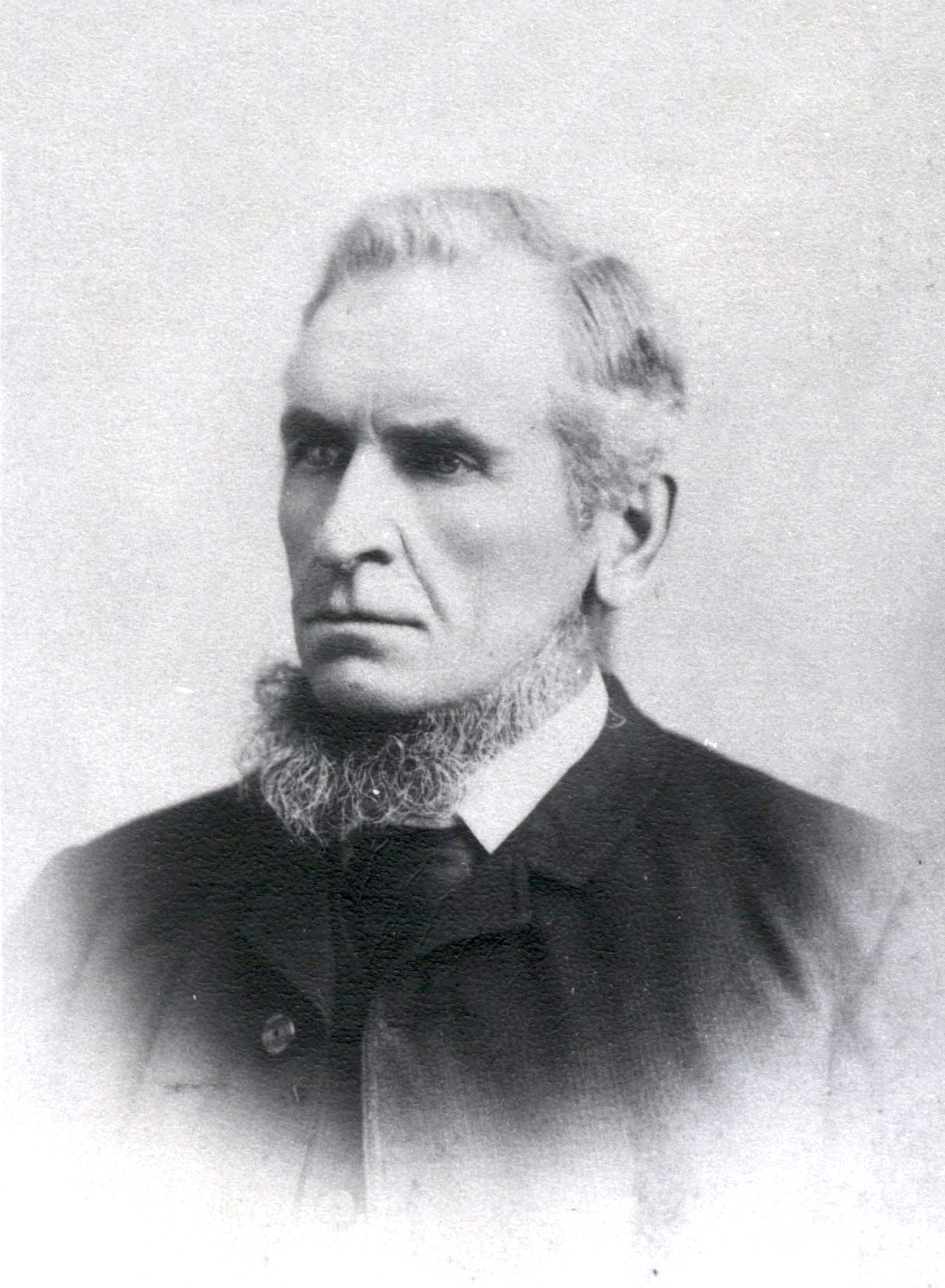
John Brown, reeve 1883/1884

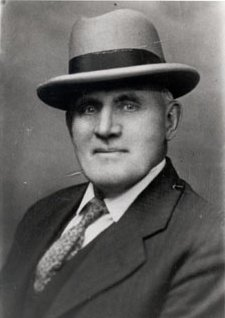
Jacob Lunau, reeve 1926 - 1932

Year	Reeve	Councillor	Councillor	Councillor	Councillor				
1873	Abraham Law	Jacob Brillinger	David Hopkins	William Powell	William S. Warren				
1874	William Harrison	William Atkinson	Isaac Crosby	John Brown	Asa B. Wilson				
1875	William Trench III	Denis C. O'Brien	Isaac Crosby	William Pogue	Asa B. Wilson				
1876	William Trench III	Peter G. Savage	Isaac Crosby	William Pogue	William Powell				
1877	William Trench III	Peter G. Savage	Isaac Crosby	William Pogue	William Powell				
1878	William Trench III	Peter G. Savage	James Langstaff	Benjamin Redditt	William Powell				
1879	William Trench III	Peter G. Savage	Francis McConaghy	Benjamin Redditt	William Powell				
1880	James Langstaff	Christopher Duncumb	Isaac Crosby	Benjamin Redditt	William H. Pugsley				
1881	William Trench III	Christopher Duncumb	John H. Sanderson	Benjamin Redditt	William H. Pugsley				
1882	William Trench III	Christopher Duncumb	John H. Sanderson	Benjamin Redditt	William H. Pugsley				
1883	John Brown	Henry F. Hopper	John H. Sanderson	Isaac Crosby	William H. Pugsley				
1884	John Brown	Henry F. Hopper	Robert E. Law	Isaac Crosby	Alexander Moodie				
1885	William H. Pugsley	Peter G. Savage	Francis McConaghy	William Powell	Benjamin Redditt				
1886	William H. Pugsley	Peter G. Savage	Francis McConaghy	William Powell	Benjamin Redditt				
1887	William H. Pugsley	Peter G. Savage	Francis McConaghy	William Powell	Benjamin Redditt				
1888	William H. Pugsley	Peter G. Savage	William J. Wilson	William A. Sanderson	William Atkinson				
1889	William H. Pugsley	Peter G. Savage	William J. Wilson	William A. Sanderson	William Atkinson				
1890	William H. Pugsley	Peter G. Savage	William J. Wilson	William A. Sanderson	William Atkinson				
1891	William H. Pugsley	Peter G. Savage	William J. Wilson	William A. Sanderson	William Atkinson				
1892	William H. Pugsley	Peter G. Savage	John Brydon	Jeremiah Mortson	John Palmer				
1893	William H. Pugsley	Peter G. Savage	William Atkinson	Jeremiah Mortson	John Palmer				
1894	William H. Pugsley	Peter G. Savage	William Atkinson	Jeremiah Mortson	John Palmer				
1895	William H. Pugsley	Peter G. Savage	William Atkinson	Jeremiah Mortson	John Palmer				
1896	William H. Pugsley	Peter G. Savage	John H. Sanderson	Jeremiah Mortson	John Palmer				
1897	Peter G. Savage	William Innes	John H. Sanderson	William A. Wright	John Palmer				
1898	Peter G. Savage	William Innes	David Hill	William A. Wright	Henry F. Hopper				
1899	Peter G. Savage	William Innes	David Hill	John Palmer	Thomas H. Trench				
1900	Peter G. Savage	William Innes	David Hill	Reuben W. Glass	Thomas H. Trench				
1901	Peter G. Savage	William Innes	David Hill	William Furey	Thomas H. Trench				
1902	Peter G. Savage	William Innes	David Hill	William Furey	Thomas H. Trench				
1903	Peter G. Savage	William Innes	John P. Glass	James Paulin	Thomas H. Trench				
1904	Peter G. Savage	William Innes	John P. Glass	James Paulin	Thomas H. Trench				
1905	Peter G. Savage	William Innes	John P. Glass	Isaac Crosby	Thomas H. Trench				
1906	Isaac Crosby	Hesse A. Nicholls	John P. Glass	John H. Sanderson	Thomas H. Trench				
1907	William H. Pugsley	Hesse A. Nicholls	Edward Barker	John H. Sanderson	Thomas H. Trench				
1908	William H. Pugsley	David Sloan	Edward Barker	John H. Sanderson	Thomas H. Trench				
1909	William H. Pugsley	Herbert H. Hopper	John Palmer	John H. Sanderson	Thomas H. Trench				
1910	William H. Pugsley	George S. Sims	John Palmer	John H. Sanderson	Thomas H. Trench				
1911	William H. Pugsley	George S. Sims	John Palmer	John H. Sanderson	John Tyndall				
1912	William H. Pugsley	George S. Sims	John Palmer	John H. Sanderson	John Tyndall				
1913	William H. Pugsley	George S. Sims	John Palmer	John H. Sanderson	John Tyndall				
1914	William H. Pugsley	George S. Sims	John Hickson	John H. Sanderson	John Tyndall				
1915	William H. Pugsley	George S. Sims	John Hickson	John H. Sanderson	John Tyndall				
1916	William H. Pugsley	George S. Sims	John Hickson	John H. Sanderson	John Tyndall				
1917	William H. Pugsley	Jacob Lunau	George A. McDonald	Joseph A. Monkman	Thomas H. Trench				
1918	William H. Pugsley	Jacob Lunau	George A. McDonald	Joseph A. Monkman	Thomas H. Trench				
1919	Thomas H. Trench	Jacob Lunau	John A. Greene	Joseph A. Monkman	David Hill				
1920	Thomas H. Trench	Jacob Lunau	John A. Greene	Joseph A. Monkman	David Hill				
1921	Thomas H. Trench	Jacob Lunau	Norman Batty	Joseph A. Monkman	David Hill				
1922	Thomas H. Trench	Jacob Lunau	Norman Batty	Joseph A. Monkman	David Hill				
1923	Thomas H. Trench	Jacob Lunau	Norman Batty	Joseph A. Monkman	David Hill				
1924	Thomas H. Trench	John A. Greene	Robert N. Endean	James McLean	William H. Pugsley				
1925	Thomas H. Trench	John A. Greene	Jacob Lunau	James McLean	William H. Pugsley				
1926	Jacob Lunau	John A. Greene	Walter G. Baldock	J. Roy Herrington	Gordon H. Sloan				
1927	Jacob Lunau	James McLean	Walter G. Baldock	J. Roy Herrington	Gordon H. Sloan				
1928	Jacob Lunau	James McLean	David Hill	A. Chapman	Gordon H. Sloan				
1929	Jacob Lunau	Henry Davis	Frederick J. Mansbridge	Wesley Middleton	Frank E. Sims				
1930	Jacob Lunau	Henry Davis	Albert Chapman	Wesley Middleton	Frank E. Sims				
1931	Jacob Lunau	David Hill	James McLean	Harold Mills	Joseph Monkman				
1932	Jacob Lunau	David Hill	J.A. Greene	Harold Mills	Joseph Monkman				
1933	J.A. Greene	Alex Little	Wes Middleton	Harold Mills	James McLean				
1934	J.A. Greene	Alex Little	Wes Middleton	Harold Mills	William Neal				
1935	J.A. Greene	Alex Little	James McLean	Harold Mills	William Neal				
1936	J.A. Greene	Alex Little	James McLean	Harold Mills	Percy Hill				
1937	J.A. Greene	Alex Little	Christian Nelson	Harold Mills	Percy Hill				
1938	J.A. Greene	Alex Little	Christian Nelson	Harold Mills	Percy Hill				
1939	J.A. Greene	Alex Little	Christian Nelson	Harold Mills	Percy Hill				
1940	Thomas Trench	Robert Little	Wes Middleton	William Neal	Dr. J.P. Wilson				
1941	Thomas Trench	Robert Little	Wes Middleton	William Neal	Dr. J.P. Wilson				
1942	Thomas Trench	Robert Little	Wes Middleton	William Neal	Dr. J.P. Wilson				
1943	J.A. Greene	Allan Bales	Wes Middleton	Percy Hills	Ralph Paris				
1944	William Neal	Allan Bales	Wes Middleton	Percy Hills	Ralph Paris				
1945	William Neal	Allan Bales	Wes Middleton	Percy Hills	Ralph Paris				
1946	William Neal	Allan Bales	Wes Middleton	Percy Hills	Ralph Paris				
1947	William Neal	Cecil Mabley	Wes Middleton	Percy Hills	Ralph Paris				
1948	Percy Hill	Cecil Mabley	Wes Middleton	W.J. Taylor	Ken Tomlin				
1949	Percy Hill	Cecil Mabley	Wes Middleton	W.J. Taylor	Ken Tomlin				
1950	J.A. Greene (Note: Greene died in January 1951, and William Neal was elected reeve in February 1951.)	Cecil Mabley	Wes Middleton	W.J. Taylor	Floyd Perkins				
1951	J.A. Greene	Ken Tomlin	Wes Middleton	W.J. Taylor	Floyd Perkins				
1952	W.J. Taylor	Ken Tomlin	Wes Middleton	Jack Rice	Floyd Perkins				
1953	W.J. Taylor	Ken Tomlin	Wes Middleton	Jack Rice	Floyd Perkins				
1954	W.J. Taylor	Ken Tomlin	Wes Middleton	Harold Jones	Floyd Perkins				
1955	W.J. Taylor	Ken Tomlin	Wes Middleton	Harold Jones	Floyd Perkins				
1956	W.J. Taylor	Ken Tomlin	Donald Plaxton	Harold Jones					
In 1957, with the incorporation of Richmond Hill as a town, the positions of Mayor and Deputy Reeve were added to the council
Year	Mayor	Reeve	Deputy Reeve	Councillor	Councillor	Councillor	Councillor		
1957	William Neal	W.J. Taylor	Floyd Perkins	James Haggart	Harold Jones	Donald Plaxton	Stanley Tinker		
1958	Ken Tomlin	W.J. Taylor	Donald Plaxton	James Haggart	James Bradstock	Joseph Patterson	Stanley Tinker		
1959	Ken Tomlin	Floyd Perkins	Stanley Tinker	James Haggart	James Bradstock	Joseph Patterson	Robert Ross		
1960	Ken Tomlin	James Haggart	Stanley Tinker	Thomas Broadhurst	James Bradstock	Margaret Southwell	Howard Whillans		
1961	James Haggart	Floyd Perkins	John Bradstock	Thomas Broadhurst	Alan White	Margaret Southwell	Howard Whillans		
1962	James Haggart	Floyd Perkins	Thomas Broadhurst	Alex Campbell	Alan White	Margaret Southwell	John MacDiarmid		
1963	William Neal	Floyd Perkins	Stanley Tinker	Alex Campbell	Alan White	Thomas Murphy	Walter Scudds		
1964	Thomas Broadhurst	James Haggart	Stanley Tinker	Lois Hancey	William Lazenby	Robert Saunders	Walter Scudds		
1965	Thomas Broadhurst	Donald Plaxton	Floyd Perkins	Lois Hancey	William Lazenby	Eric Handbury	Walter Scudds		
1966/67	Thomas Broadhurst	Donald Plaxton	Floyd Perkins	Lois Hancey	William Lazenby	John MacDiarmid	Ivan Mansbridge		
1968/69	Thomas Broadhurst	Donald Plaxton	Floyd Perkins	Lois Hancey	William Lazenby	John MacDiarmid	Ivan Mansbridge		
1970	William Lazenby	Donald Plaxton	Ivan Mansbridge	Lois Hancey	Shaun Beggs	Eric George	David Schiller		
In 1971, with the incorporation of York Region, the council was again reorganised.
Year	Mayor	Regional Councillor	Regional Councillor	Councillor	Councillor	Councillor	Councillor	Councillor	Councillor
1971/72	William Lazenby	Donald Plaxton	Gordon Rowe	Shaun Beggs	Stewart Bell	Andrew Chateauvert	Lois Hancey	David Schiller	Lou Wainwright
1973/74	William Lazenby	Lois Hancey	Gordon Rowe	William Corcoran	Graeme Bales	Andrew Chateauvert	David Stephenson	Charles Stewart	Lou Wainwright
1975/76	David Schiller	Lois Hancey	Gordon Rowe	William Corcoran	John Birchall	Andrew Chateauvert	Marylo Graham	Mike Burnie	Al Duffy
1977/78	David Schiller	Lois Hancey	Lou Wainwright	William Corcoran	John Birchall	Andrew Chateauvert	Marylo Graham	Mike Burnie	Al Duffy
1979/80	David Schiller	Gordon Rowe	Lou Wainwright	William Corcoran	John Birchall	David Amos	David Barrow	Mike Burnie	Al Duffy
1981/82	Al Duffy	Gordon Rowe	Lois Hancey	William Corcoran	Doug Smith	Bill Bell	David Barrow	Bob Cage	Frank Gallant
1982-85	Al Duffy	Gordon Rowe	Lois Hancey	William Corcoran	Doug Smith	Bill Bell	David Barrow	Bob Cage	Frank Gallant
1985-88	Al Duffy	Gordon Rowe	Lois Hancey	Tom Simpson	Doug Smith	Bill Bell	Gail Blackburn	Bob Cage	Bryon Wilfert
1988-91	Bill Bell	Frank Endean	Lois Hancey	Tom Simpson	Janet Mabley	David Cohen	Gail Blackburn	Catherine Bishop	Bryon Wilfert
1991-94	Bill Bell	Gail Blackburn	Isabelle Gargarella	Tom Simpson	Janet Mabley	David Cohen	Jane Robertson	Catherine Bishop	Bryon Wilfert
1994-97	Bill Bell	Gail Blackburn	Janet Mabley	Vito Spatafora	Brenda Hogg	David Cohen	Jane Robertson	Nick Papa	Bryon Wilfert
1997-00	Bill Bell	David Barrow	Janet Mabley	Vito Spatafora	Brenda Hogg	David Cohen	David Bishop	Nick Papa	Joe DiPaola
2000-03	Bill Bell	David Barrow	Brenda Hogg	Vito Spatafora	Arnie Warner	David Cohen	Lynn Foster	Nick Papa	Joe DiPaola
2003-06	Bill Bell	David Barrow	Brenda Hogg	Vito Spatafora	Arnie Warner	David Cohen	Lynn Foster	Elio Di Iorio	Joe DiPaola
2006-10	David Barrow (Note: Barrow retired from council on September 15, 2021. A by-election was held on January 18–24, 2022 where Ward 4 Councillor David West was elected as mayor. West will be mayor for the remainder of the term until the next election in October 2022.)	Vito Spatafora	Brenda Hogg	Greg Beros	Arnie Warner	David Cohen	Lynn Foster	Nick Papa	Godwin Chan
2010-14	David Barrow	Vito Spatafora	Brenda Hogg	Greg Beros	Carmine Perrelli	Castro Liu	Lynn Foster	Nick Papa	Godwin Chan
2014-18	David Barrow	Vito Spatafora	Brenda Hogg	Greg Beros	Tom Muench	Castro Liu	David West (Note: Vacant as of January 25, 2022. West was elected as mayor in a by-election and vacated his Ward 4 seat.)	Karen Cilevitz	Godwin Chan
2018-22	David Barrow	Joe DiPaola	Carmine Perrelli	Greg Beros	Tom Muench	Castro Liu	David West	Karen Cilevitz	Godwin Chan
2021-2022	Joe DiPaola (Acting)	Joe DiPaola	Carmine Perrelli	Greg Beros	Tom Muench	Castro Liu	Raika Sheppard (From March 22, 2022 - Nov 15, 2022)	Karen Cilevitz	Godwin Chan
2022-26	David West	Joe DiPaola	Godwin Chan	Carol Davidson	Scott Thompson	Castro Liu	Simon Cui	Karen Cilevitz	Micheal Shiu

== Deputy Mayor ==
- Vito Spatafora - 2006-2018
- Carmine Perrelli - 2018-2021 (Council in Sept 2021 decided to have one Deputy Mayor instead of Two)
- Joe DiPaola - 2018-2022 (Sole Deputy Mayor from Sept 2021 - Nov 2022, served as Acting Mayor from February 2021 to January 2022 during Dave Barrow's leave of absence and eventual resignation until David West was elected in the Jan 2022 by-election)
- Godwin Chan - 2022–Present
