= William Harrison (Canadian politician) =

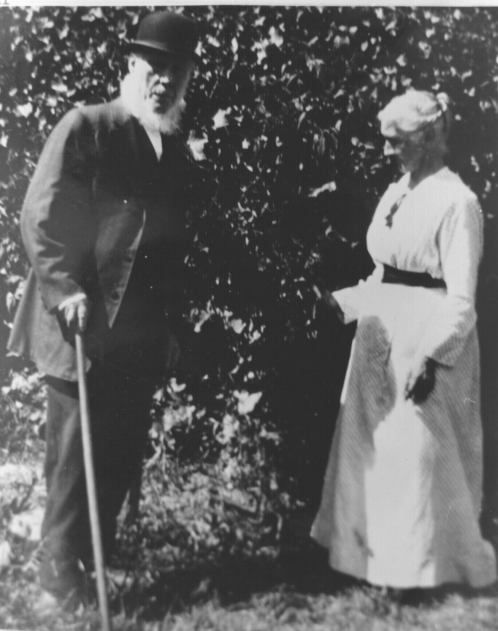
- William Harrison with wife Christina
- Born: May 10, 1834
- Died: March 2, 1922 (aged 87)
- Resting place: Richmond Hill Presbyterian cemetery
- Spouse: Christina Harrison (née Whelpton)

William Harrison (May 10, 1834 – March 2, 1922) was a harness and saddle maker who served as the second reeve of Richmond Hill, Ontario, in 1874. He was the community's first historian.

Born in Bath, England, his family moved to a farm north of Richmond Hill in 1843. After the death of his father a mere nine months after the family arrived in Canada, the family moved into the Richmond Hill community. Harrison opened a saddle and harness maker's shop in Richmond Hill in 1856. In Richmond Hill, Harrison took an active role in society. He was involved in organising the community's first fire brigade. He was a founding member of the Richmond Hill Mechanics' Institute and Literary Society. Harrison closed his shop in 1908.

Harrison was elected reeve of the village of Richmond Hill in 1874. He served on the Richmond Hill Village Council only a single year, and was replaced in 1875 by William Trench.
