= Isaac Crosby =

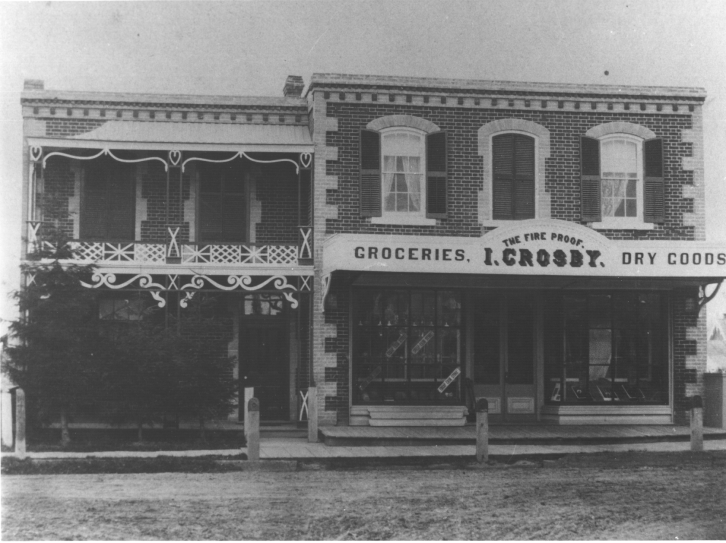
The Fire Proof in the 1880s

Isaac Crosby (1842 – January 7, 1911) was a general store owner and sometime village councillor of Richmond Hill, Ontario who was elected reeve to the Richmond Hill Village Council in 1905.

Born in Richmond Hill, Crosby worked with his father, Parker Crosby in his general store, known locally as The Fire Proof. Crosby inherited The Fire Proof from his father in 1869. Crosby was first elected to the Richmond Hill Village Council in 1874 as a councillor. He was re-elected in 1875, 1876 and 1877. He was again elected a councillor in 1880, 1883 and 1884. In 1905, Crosby stood for election again and was elected councillor, and in 1906 he stood for reeve and was elected to that position.

Crosby died in 1911, and was buried in Richmond Hill Presbyterian Cemetery.
