= Matthew Teefy =

Canadian businessman (1822–1911)

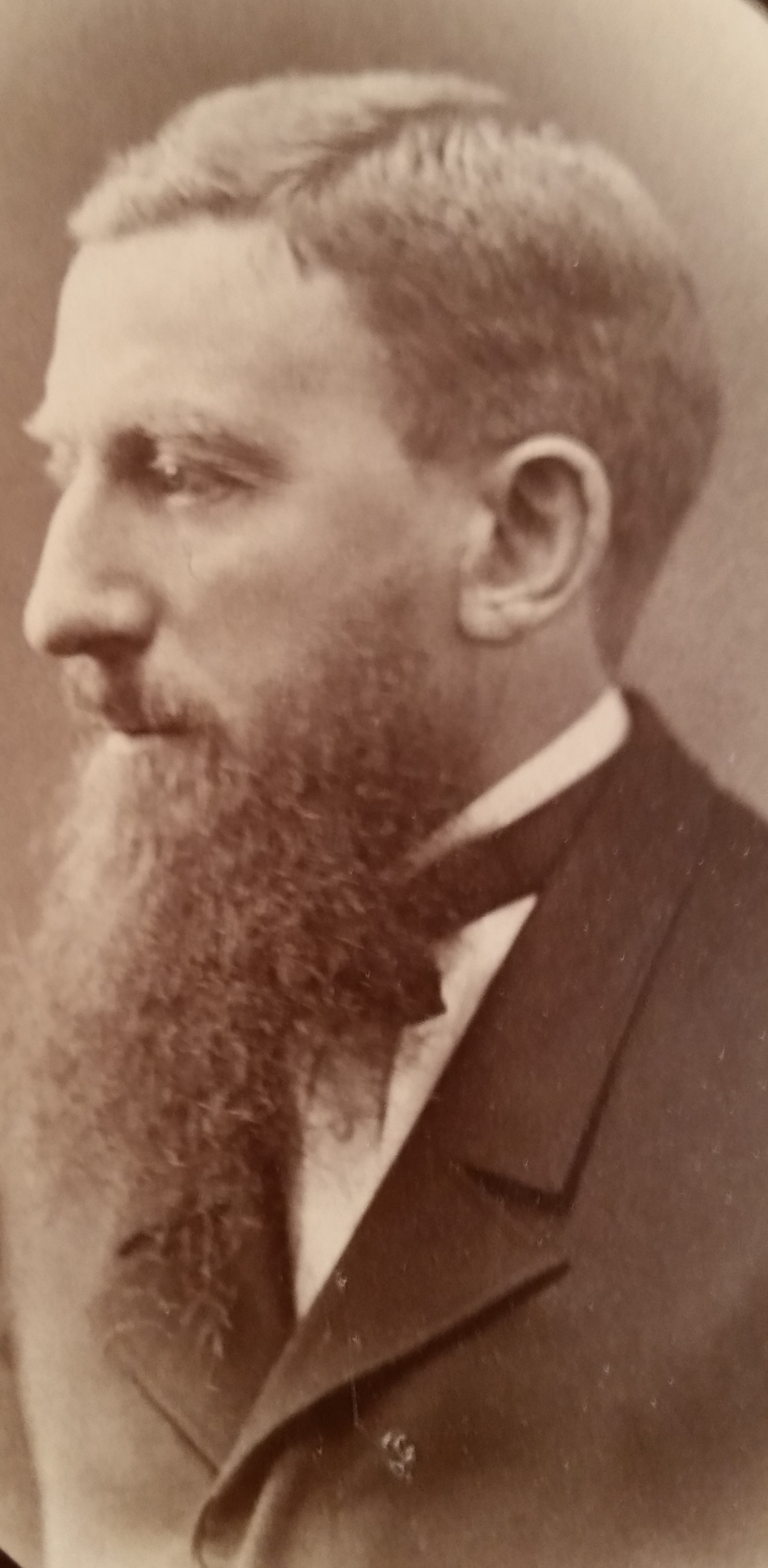
Young Matthew Teefy

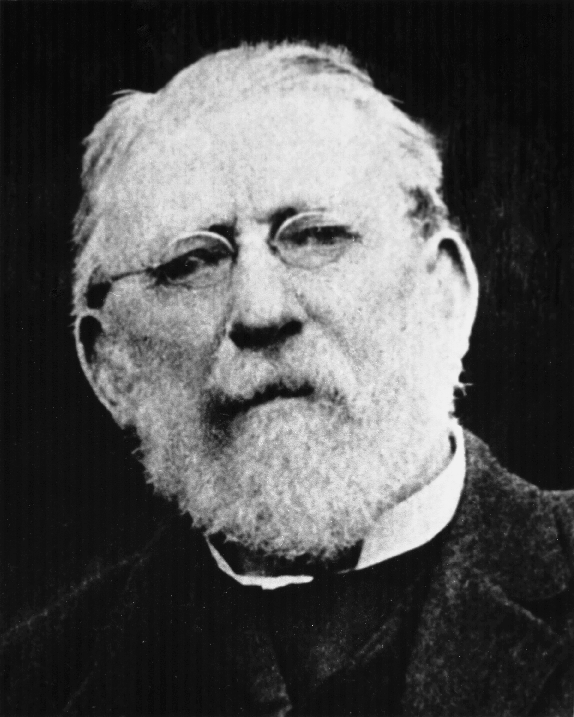
Matthew Teefy

Matthew Teefy (April 18, 1822 – December 19, 1911) was postmaster, a general merchant, village clerk and a justice of the peace in Richmond Hill, Ontario.

== Biography ==
Born in Tipperary, Ireland, Teefy came to York, Upper Canada with his family at the age of two. He began his career by apprenticing as a printer.

In 1846 he married Betsy Clarkson, with whom he would go on to father nine children, six of whom survived to adulthood. The couple's first child was born March 2, 1847. Their second child, John Read Teefy, was born August 21, 1848. J.R. Teefy would be the namesake of Teefy House at the University of Toronto. Another son, Robert Baldwin Teefy, emigrated to California and became one of the founders of Bank of Italy, predecessor to the Bank of America.

Teefy was appointed postmaster of Richmond Hill on December 3, 1850, and the village's treasurer in 1873. He resigned his position as village treasurer in 1904, but remained the village postmaster until his death in 1911. At the time of his death he was the longest-serving postmaster in Canada. He was buried in St. Luke's Catholic church cemetery in Thornhill, Ontario.

Teefy Avenue in Richmond Hill is named in his honour.

== See also ==
- History of Richmond Hill, Ontario
