= British Methodist Episcopal Church =

Methodist denomination

- Classification: Methodism
- Orientation: Holiness movement
- Theology: Wesleyan
- Origin: 26 September 1856

The British Methodist Episcopal Church (BMEC) is a Methodist denomination based in Canada. The BMEC was organized on 26 September 1856.

The majority of the British Methodist Episcopal Church merged with the African Methodist Episcopal Church (AMEC), though many of the British Methodist Episcopal congregations in Ontario and elsewhere chose to continue the British Methodist Episcopal Church, which remains active today.

== History ==
The AMEC had been formed in 1816 when a number of black congregations banded together under the leadership of Richard Allen, and by the mid-1850s it had seven conferences in the United States. AMEC preachers began to work in Upper Canada in 1834, and a conference was formed in 1840.

In 1850, the Fugitive Slave Act was passed in the United States causing some ex-slave AMEC preachers in the United Canadas to be fearful of attending conferences in the U.S.

Reverend Benjamin Stewart of Chatham, Ontario proposed that the AME churches in the United Canadas separate from the U.S. association and form their own church. At an AME conference the new church was named the British Methodist Episcopal Church in appreciation of finding a safe haven from slavery in British North America. In Philadelphia in 1856, Stewart's proposal was adopted and the new church association was founded. Reverend Augustus R. Green, later BME Bishop Green, publisher and editor of the True Royalist and Weekly Intelligencer was also a part of this movement. It is reported that Green was thrown out of the Church when he and colleagues challenged Nazrey, and that they founded the Independent Methodist Episcopal Church)

Its first bishop was Reverend Willis Nazrey of Virginia. When Nazrey died in 1875, Richard Randolph Disney was chosen as his successor, and he was ordained by an AMEC bishop that year. His administrative area consisted of Ontario, Nova Scotia, Bermuda, the West Indies, and British Guiana (Guyana).

By 1880, the BMEC had "grown from 250 to 2,684 members, and boasted 77 ministers, 37 Sabbath-schools, 1,727 scholars, 156 officers and teachers, 10 church buildings, and over 25,000 attendees in the Caribbean". However, the mission work outside Canada stretched the church's funds, and in 1880 Disney negotiated a reunion with the AMEC at the quadrennial General Conference, setting into motion a union between the AMEC and the BMEC that was later ratified at a BMEC convention held at Hamilton in June 1881. The merger seemed beneficial for the AMEC because of the step that it represented towards the consolidation of Black Methodists across North America. A merger would also stretch the AMEC's influence. A referendum of members showed that although a majority in Ontario was opposed, 86 per cent of the membership was in favour. Disney was accepted as an AMEC bishop and was assigned to its Tenth Episcopal District, a region embracing his former territory and some of the AMEC churches in Canada that had not joined the BMEC.

A majority of the Ontario churches and preachers, led by the Reverend Walter Hawkins of Chatham, sought to re-establish the BMEC. This group feared the loss of their distinctive identity, and may have been concerned that the opinions of Ontario members had been overwhelmed by those of the Caribbean groups.

In 1886 this group held an ecclesiastical council at Chatham, at which it was claimed that Disney had defected to the AMEC. At a subsequent general conference that year the BMEC was reconstituted. The conference deposed Disney, agreeing to "erase his name and ignore his authority, and cancel his official relationship as bishop." The reconstituted BMEC elected Hawkins as its general superintendent, avoiding the title of bishop for several years.

Disney continued with what was left of his AMEC district until 1888, when he was transferred to Arkansas and Mississippi.

By 1898 the BMEC had 27 preaching points and 25 preachers, the AMEC 130 churches in Canada. The two denominations continue their separate work to this day.

== Modern day ==
As of 2018, ten British Methodist Episcopal churches remain in operation, with churches operating in the following cities:

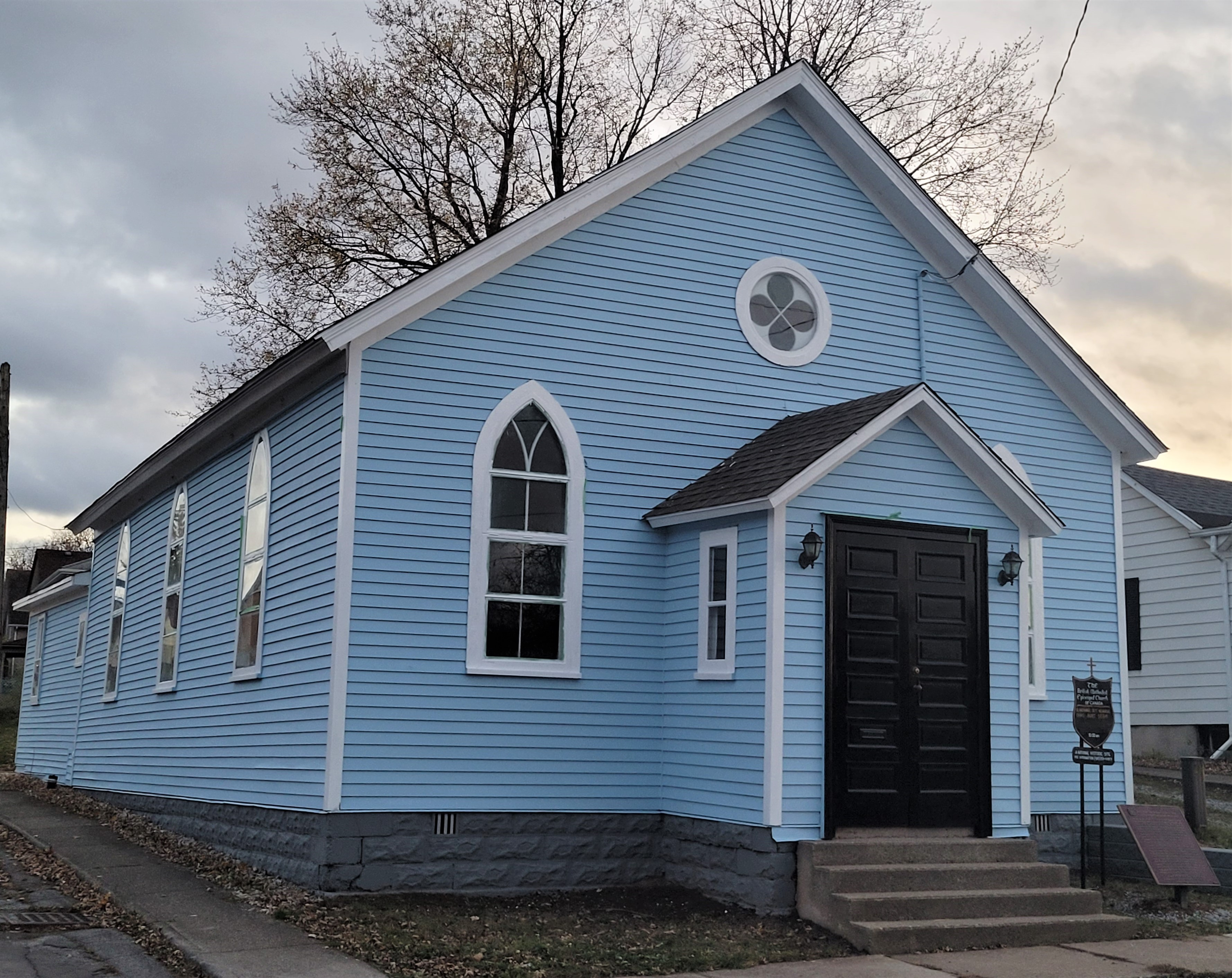
R. Nathaniel Dett British Methodist Episcopal Church, Niagara Falls, Ontario. National Historic Site of Canada

- Toronto (2) - East York and York
- London
- Owen Sound
- Brantford
- Windsor
- Mississauga
- Niagara Falls
- St. Catharines
- Brantford

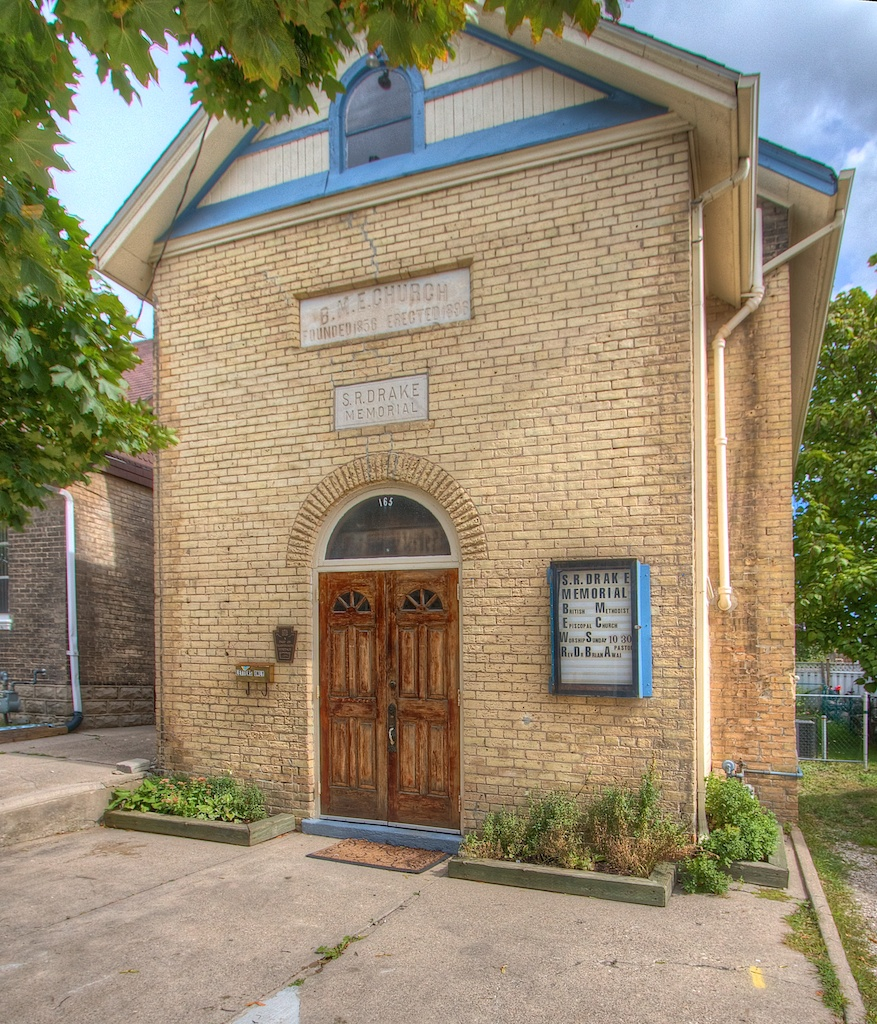
S.R. Drake Memorial Church in Brantford, ON

Former BME churches existed in Stratford, Fort Erie, Queen's Bush, Puce (Lakeshore), Simcoe, Ingersoll, Dresden, and Harrow. These churches would have formed the centre of a sizable black community in these towns. In 1985, the BME church in Woodstock, Ontario, Hawkins Chapel, shut its doors and was converted into a single-family home. The BME church of Collingwood followed a similar fate in 1990. In 2003, the North Buxton congregation broke with the church - choosing to operate as an independent community church instead. The most recent church to close its doors was in Guelph in 2011. The former BME building was put up for sale, and purchased by the Guelph Black Heritage Society in 2012.

Two BME churches have been designated National Historic Sites of Canada due to their roles in welcoming Underground Railroad refugees to the United Canadas and their historic importance to the Black community in the Niagara region: one in Niagara Falls, Ontario, named in honour of Robert Nathaniel Dett, and the Salem Chapel, British Methodist Episcopal Church in St. Catharines, due to its association with Harriet Tubman.

== Bishops ==
1. Reverend Willis Nazrey (1856-1875)
2. Bishop Richard Randolph Disney (1875-

== See also ==
- List of Methodist churches
- List of Methodist denominations
- Richard Amos Ball

== Bibliography ==
- Windsor Mosaic
- Dictionary of Canadian Biography
- Ontario Heritage Trust Salem Chapel British Methodist Episcopal Church
