= Peter G. Savage =

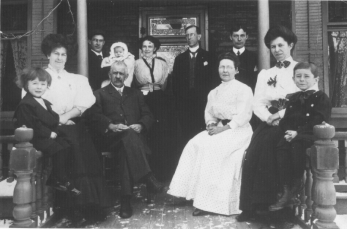
Peter Savage and family, 1909

Peter Gould Savage (February 28, 1846 – February 3, 1922) was a village councillor for Richmond Hill, Ontario from 1876 to 1879 and 1885 to 1896. From 1897 until 1905, he served as reeve for the Richmond Hill Village Council.

Born in Dundee, Scotland, Savage came to Richmond Hill, Ontario. Savage owned a furniture store on Yonge Street in Richmond Hill, which opened sometime around 1869. He stood for village councillor and was elected in 1876. He was re-elected as a council in 1877, 1878 and 1879. He was again elected to the position each year from 1885 through 1896. In 1897 he stood for reeve and was elected, and was re-elected each year through 1905.

Savage died in 1922, and was buried in Richmond Hill Presbyterian Cemetery.
