= Yonge Street Agricultural Society =

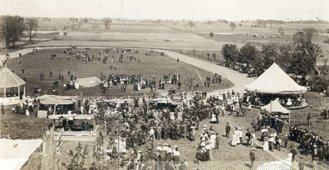
The Richmond Hill Spring Fair, organised by the Richmond Hill and Yonge Street Agricultural Society, circa 1900

The Yonge Street Agricultural Society was an agricultural society that operated under a general provincial charter which enabled the creation of such societies to develop community interest in the breeding of agricultural animals and plants. The society was based in Richmond Hill, Ontario.

== History ==
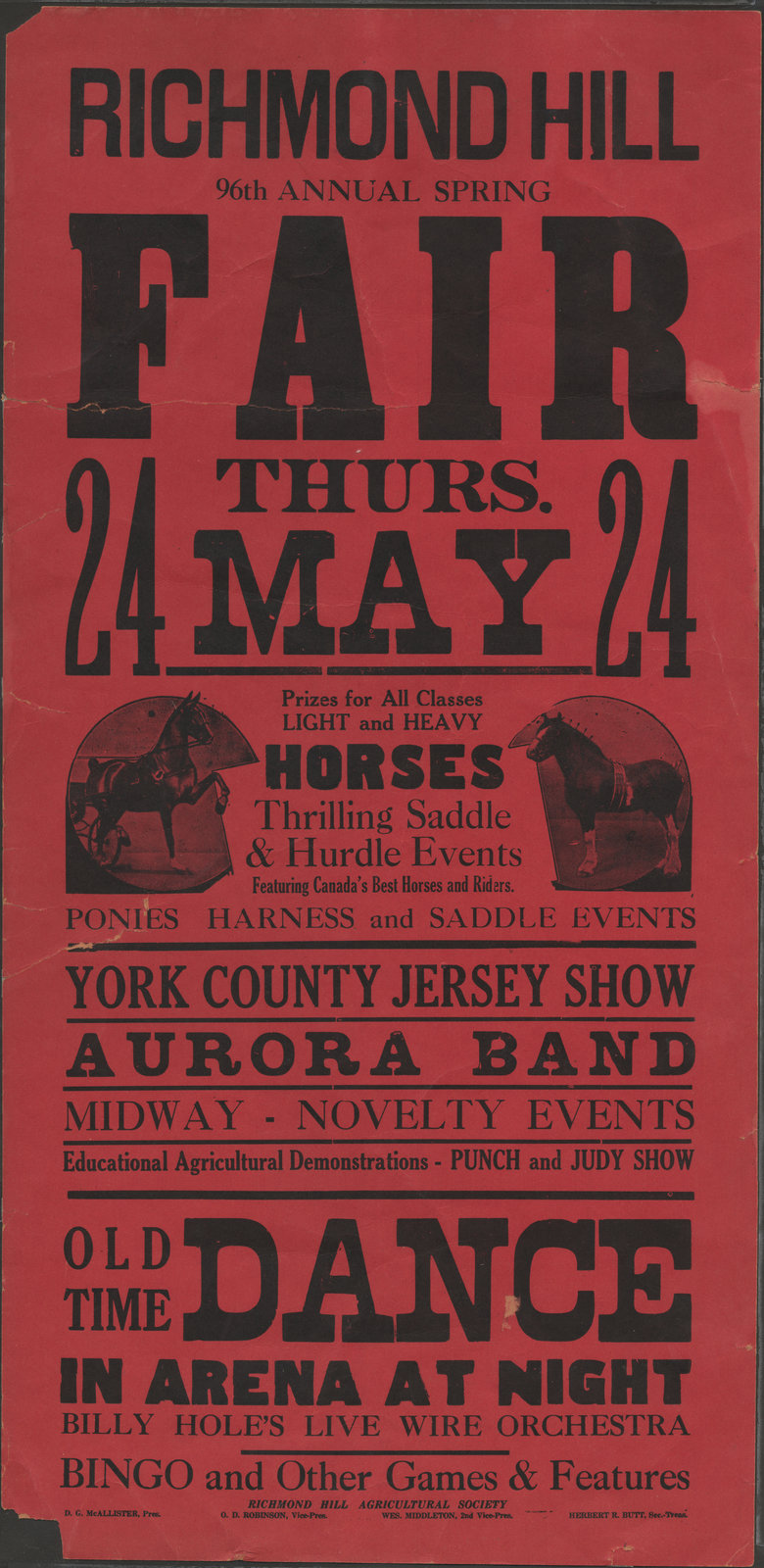
Poster for the Richmond Hill 96th Annual Spring Fair held on 24 May 1945

The Yonge Street Agricultural Society was founded in 1849. They organised the first Richmond Hill spring fair, held on May 24, 1849. The governance of the society was done by a president, two or three vice presidents and a secretary-treasurer. In addition to this the society had a large number of directors. The primary activity of the society was the organisation and running of Richmond Hill's spring agricultural fair. The society was disbanded in 1865.

The society was reformed in 1874 as the Richmond Hill and Yonge Street Agricultural Society. The last spring fair in Richmond Hill was held in 1996. By this point, Richmond Hill was suburban and no longer had enough agriculture in the community to support a fair.
