= Richard Amos Ball =

Canadian Methodist minister

Richard Amos Ball (30 November 1845 – 22 December 1925) was a British Methodist Episcopal Church (BMEC) minister in Canada.

Ball was born in St. Catharines, Ontario, Canada, the son of a fugitive slave who had made use of the Underground Railroad to come to this community. His father was a lay preacher in the congregation that later built the British Methodist Episcopal Church, Salem Chapel in St. Catharines. Richard later became a lay minister in the congregation and was ordained as a Deacon of the British Methodist Episcopal Church in 1892.

Part of Ball's historical significance comes from his association with the St. Catharines church and its parishioner Harriet Tubman.

Ball was the founder and leader of the Ball Family Jubilee Singers that traveled extensively across Canada & the US. He wrote Harriet Tubman's obituary for Canadian press. His son Rev. Richard Randolph Ball ministered in the AME church; notably Hartford, Connecticut and Rochester, New York. Ball was the presiding minister at the memorial for Booker T Washington at the Zion AME Church, in Connecticut.
