= Abraham Law =

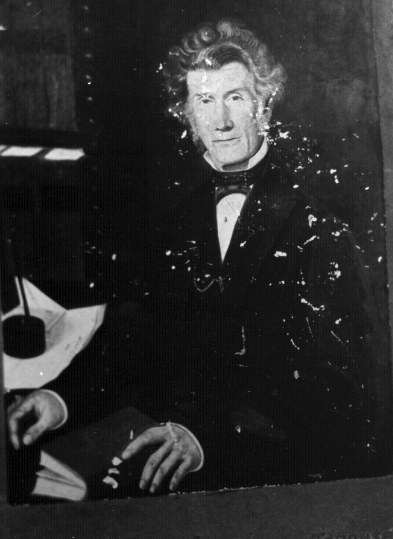
- Born: October 13, 1806; Pennsylvania
- Died: February 14, 1885 (aged 78)
- Resting place: Richmond Hill Presbyterian Church cemetery
- Occupation: Tanner
- Title: Reeve
- Spouse: Elizabeth Law (née Klinck)

Abraham Law (October 13, 1806 - February 14, 1885) was the first Reeve of Richmond Hill, Ontario. Law was married to Elizabeth Klinck, with whom he fathered thirteen children.

Law was born in Pennsylvania. In 1824 he came to Upper Canada with his parents, who settled outside of Stouffville. Law came to Richmond Hill in 1826. In Richmond Hill he took up employment as a general merchant. He soon came to own a tannery where he worked as a tanner. In 1827, he purchased a lot at the corner of Yonge Street and today's Richmond Street, where he built an estate he named "Richmond Villa" in 1833. In the 1850s, Law worked as an assessor for Vaughan Township.

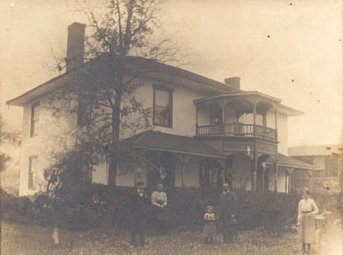
Richmond Villa

On January 6, 1873, Law was elected the first reeve of the newly incorporated village of Richmond Hill. The biggest issue that faced the Richmond Hill Village Council during his term was the need for a new high school for the village. Money was raised for the school and its construction was completed in November 1873. Law served only a single year as mayor, and was replaced in 1874 by William Harrison. Law died in Richmond Hill in 1885 and was buried in the Presbyterian church cemetery.

Law crescent in Richmond Hill was named in his honour.
