= William H. Pugsley =

William Henry Puglsey (1851 - 1933) was the reeve of Richmond Hill, Ontario, from 1885 to 1896 and from 1907 to 1918.

Pugsley began his career as a butcher and cattle dealer in Richmond Hill. He was elected to the Richmond Hill Village Council after standing for election as a councillor in 1880 and reelected in 1881, 1882 and 1883. In 1885 he stood for reeve and was elected. He was reelected every year until 1896. He was again elected to the position in 1907, successfully seeking reelection through 1918.

Pugsley died in 1933 and was buried in Richmond Hill Presbyterian Cemetery. Pugsley Avenue in Richmond Hill is named in his honour.
