= Langstaff, Ontario =

Langstaff
- Neighbourhood
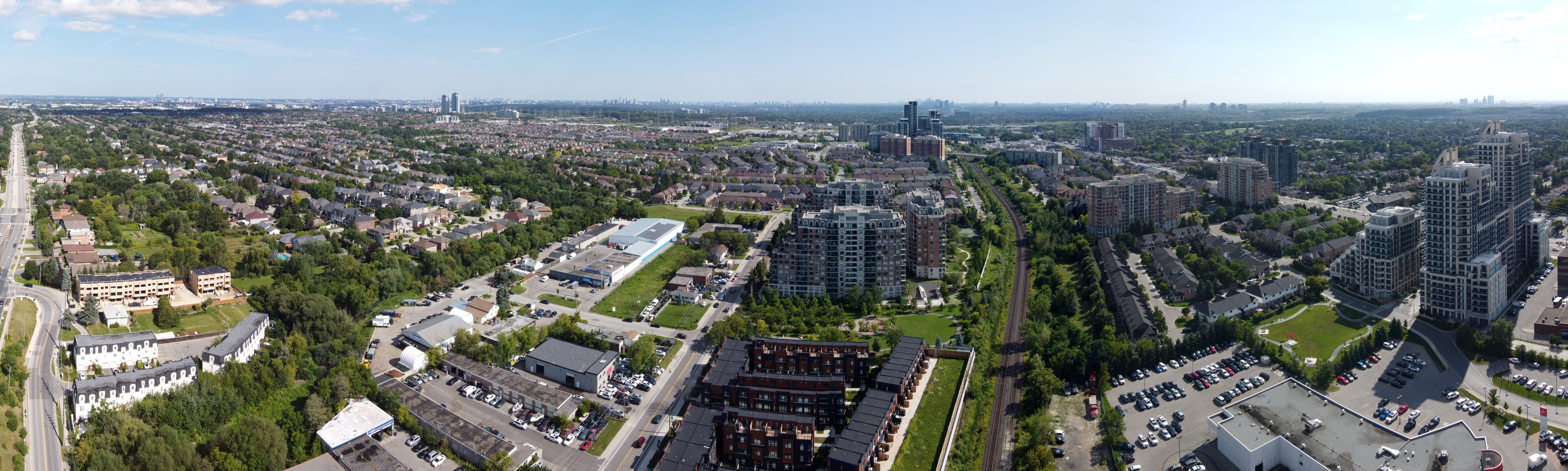
- Aerial view of Langstaff
- Interactive map of Langstaff
- Coordinates: 43°49′51″N 79°25′42″W
- Country: Canada
- Province: Ontario
- Regional municipality: York
- City: Markham
- Elevation: 184 m (604 ft)
- Time zone: UTC-5 (EST)
  - Summer (DST): UTC-4 (EDT)
- Area codes: 905 and 289
- NTS Map: 030M14
- GNBC Code: FBWGE

Langstaff is a residential area at the tripoint of the cities of Richmond Hill, Markham, and Vaughan in York Region, Ontario, Canada. Located near Highway 7 and Yonge Street, the homes in the area date to the 1960s and 1970s. The East Don River and CN Rail Bala subdivision runs through the area.

Langstaff is a former hamlet likely named for John Langstaff (1774-1865), a settler who arrived sometime between 1803 and 1808 from Piscataway, Middlesex, New Jersey and established a farm along Yonge Street. The living members of the family are no longer living in the area, as descendants of James Langstaff have moved out of Ontario. The old farm became the notorious Langstaff Jail Farm, which has since disappeared and the area is now dominated by a retail strip. The only reminder of the Langstaff family is Langstaff Road.

== Point of interest ==
- Langstaff GO Station

== See also ==
- List of unincorporated communities in Ontario
