= William Trench III =

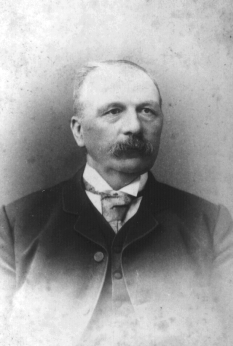
- Born: 21 October 1831; Dunbar, Scotland, United Kingdom
- Died: April 12, 1896 (aged 64); Richmond Hill, Ontario, Canada
- Occupations: Businessman, politician
- Spouse: Margaret Trench (née Cook)

Reeve of Richmond Hill
- In office 1875–1879
- In office 1881–1882

William Trench III (October 21, 1831 - April 12, 1896) was the reeve of Richmond Hill, Ontario from 1875–1879 and 1881 - 1882.

Born in Dunbar, Scotland, Trench emigrated to Canada with his family in 1842. settling in Elgin Mills, Ontario. Trench learned the blacksmith trade from his father and set up a shop in Richmond Hill in 1857. In 1866, Richmond Hill set up its first fire brigade, and Trench was chosen the first fire chief.

== Trench Carriage Works ==
Trench later owned a carriage factory named the "Trench Carriage Works" in Richmond Hill that was one of the village's leading employer during the 1870s through 1890s. Trench manufactured buggies, wagons, stagecoaches, and carriages used in the mid to late 19th Century Ontario, but would go out of business in the 1920s due to the movement towards automobiles

Trench Street in Richmond Hill is named in his honour.

Trench died in Richmond Hill in 1896.

The buildings that housed the business remains in use as retail shops at 10117, 10119 and 10123 Yonge Street (southeast corner at Yonge Street and Lorne Avenue).
