= Lake St. George (Ontario) =

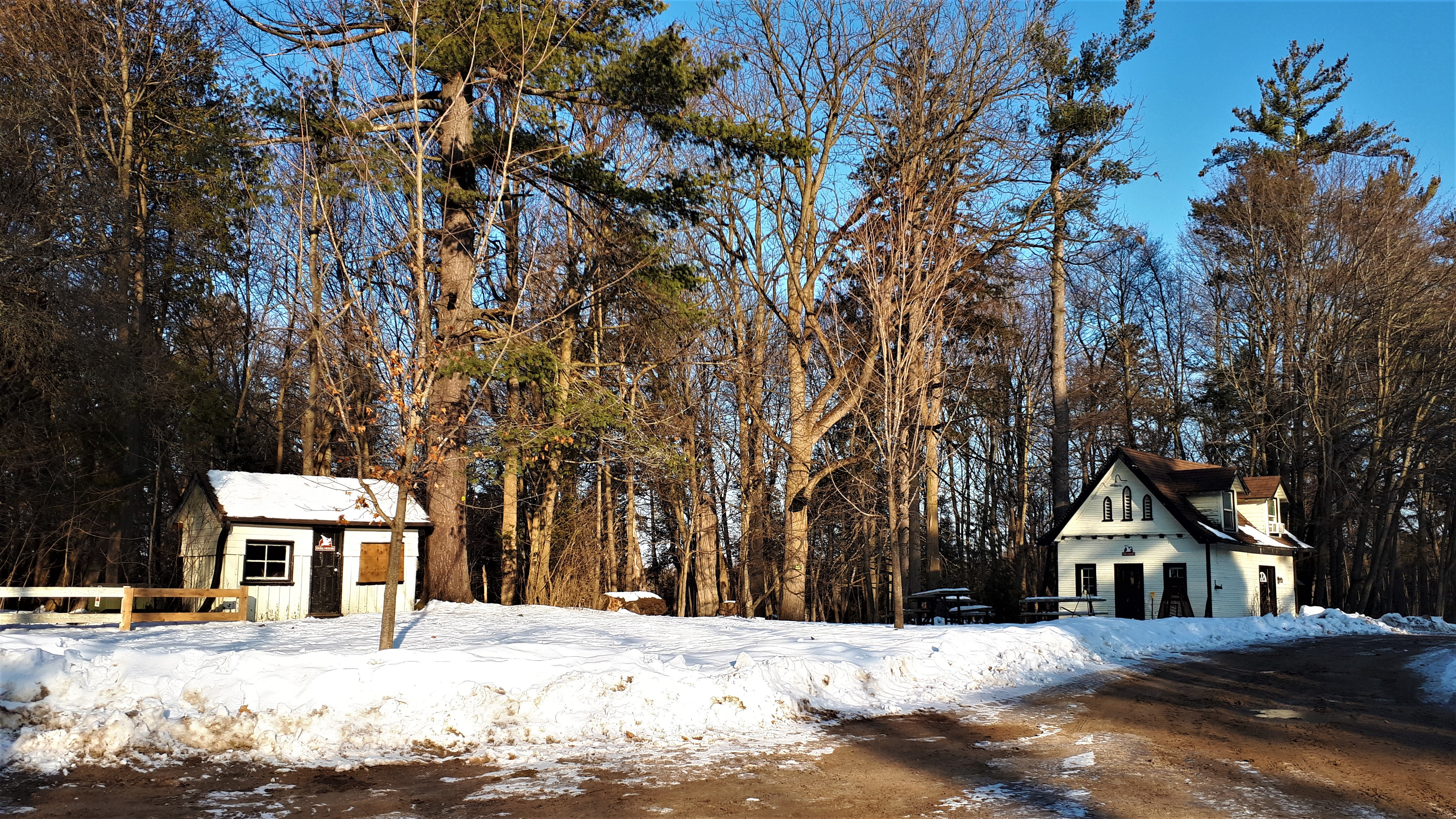
- Lake St. George Conservation Field Centre-Doll House and Chalet

- Location within Ontario
- Location: Richmond Hill, Ontario
- Coordinates: 43°57′20.71″N 79°25′32.37″W
- Lake type: Kettle lake
- Basin countries: Canada
- Surface area: 140 ha (350 acres)

Lake St. George is a kettle lake in Richmond Hill, Ontario and now located in the restricted-access conservation area managed by the Toronto Region Conservation Authority (TRCA). There is no public access to Lake St. George. Fishing and hiking at the site are strictly prohibited unless arranged through TRCA.

The lake is named for Henri St. George, French-born son of French Royalist, and one-time settler in Upper Canada Quetton St. George. Henri St. George settled in Upper Canada in 1847 and established his Glen Lonely estate in Richmond Hill, which contained the lake that bears his name.

== Lake St. George Conservation Field Centre ==
St. George died in 1896 and the property was owned by various people over the following decades. Robert Davies, the son of William Davies (founder of Canada Packers) purchased the property in 1906 and built the large estate house now known as 'Davies Hall'. After Davies death, the Glen Lonely lands were bought by Schuyler Snively, a World War 1 veteran, who transformed the property into a successful dairy farm, and model country estate. In 1965 the Snively family negotiated the sale of the property to the Toronto and Region Conservation Authority, with a proviso that they be allowed to reside there until their deaths. With Marjory's passing in 1968 and Schuyler in 1971, the sale of the land was complete.

In 1979 the Glen Lonely Farm and Estate was reborn as the Lake St. George Conservation Field Centre, an outdoor education facility that serves many school boards in Toronto and York Region as well as serving as a research and training resource for schools and universities throughout Ontario. Lake St. George's quiet, expansive forests and meadows, and its pristine kettle lake have become the basis for thousands of students introduction to experiential learning through a variety Ontario curriculum based programs.

== See also ==
Other kettle lakes and bodies of water near Lake St. George:

- Philips Lake at MacLeod's Landing
- Bond Lake (Ontario), spring fed lake was home to recreation park in late 19th and early 20th Century
- Lake Wilcox
