= Spring Valley Nature Preserve =

Nature reserve in Granville, Ohio

Coordinates: 40°03′17″N 82°31′49″W

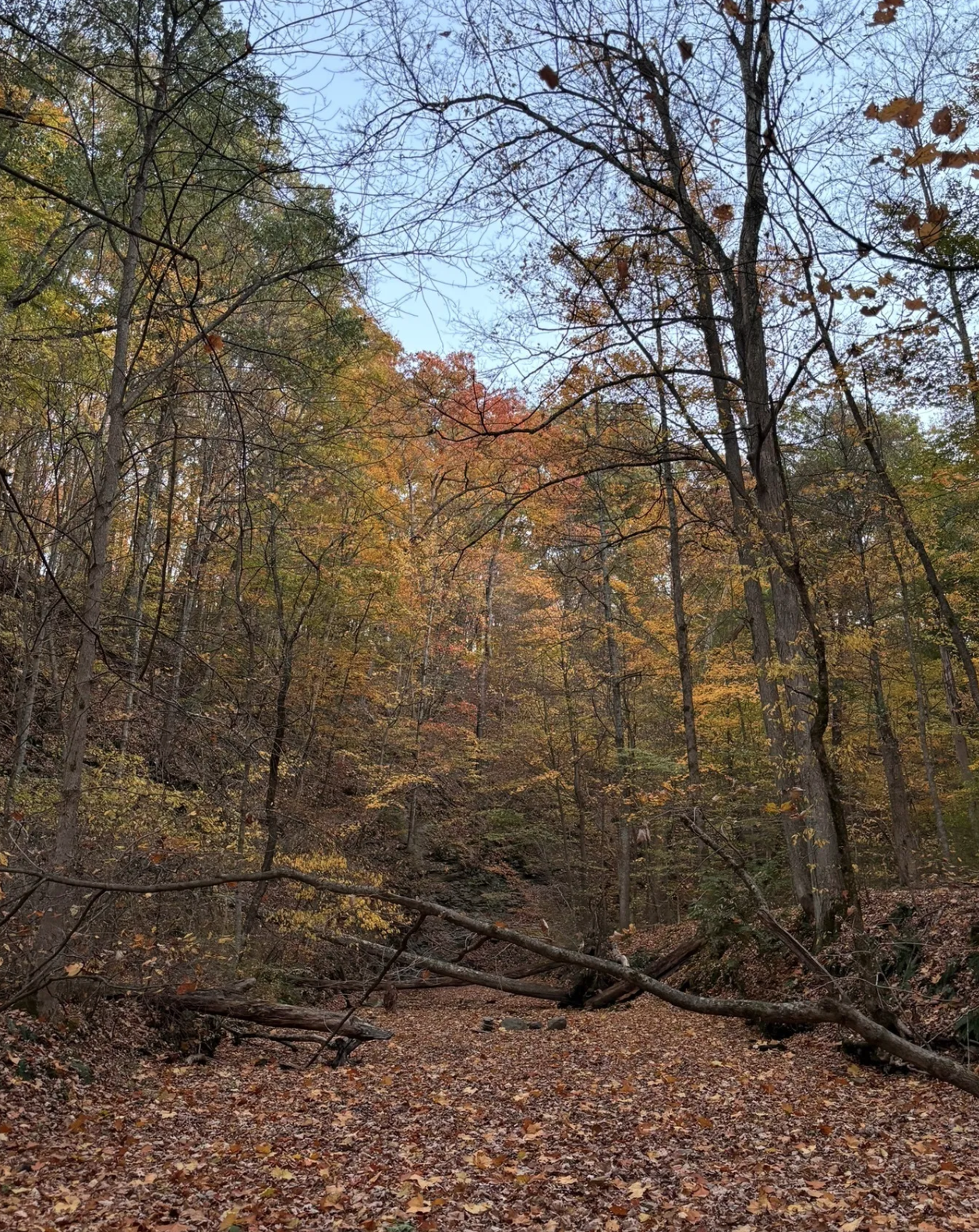
Picture of Spring Valley Nature Preserve

Spring Valley Nature Preserve is a 45-acre nature reserve located on Columbus Road in Granville, Ohio. Before becoming a nature preserve, the area was used for salt production and was home to a spring-fed community swimming pool. Spring Valley Nature Preserve provides the public with a space for recreational activities, such as hiking and bird watching.

== Geology and geography ==
Salt Run—the area where Spring Valley Nature Preserve is located—contains a mature beech-maple forest. is mostly wooded with maple trees, glaciers’ soil, and stratified rocks. These structures help shed light on Flowerpot Hill—a large sandstone land formation sloped on both sides. The preserve includes a variety of permutations and combinations of these landscapes—additionally, Spring Valley shares Ohio’s geology characterized by large coal swamps and a few high hills.

Osage orange trees, or hedge- apple trees as they are often called, line the area with their main characteristic trunk and two branches that total to a length of about 3.5 miles. These trees are characterized by their strength, and some are over 150 years old.

== History ==
The Salt Run area once contained many ceremonial mounds and earthworks created by the region's indigenous inhabitants. Many of these features were destroyed by settlers, though some burial mounds remain.

After the area's settlement by European Americans in the early 19th century, salt production took place on the land that is now part of Spring Valley Nature Preserve. A farmer named Richard George, who owned the property from 1843 to 1880, would transport the salt he harvested to Lake Erie in a conestoga wagon.

In the late 19th century, Salt Run was a popular gathering spot for events such as dances, picnics, birthday parties, memorial services, and 4 July celebrations. One tree, known as "the Proposal Tree" was commonly sought out by young lovers.

In the 20th century, Willis Chamberlin and A.P. Nichol owned the property. Edwin Roberts purchased the property in 1929 and had the Spring Valley swimming pool build there in 1933. The pool, which was spring-fed, had a sandy beach and was 12-feet deep at its deepest end. During World War II, a climbing tower was built in the pool so that soldiers could practice being in water before heading off to war.

The Spring Valley Pool remained in the Robers family and operated continuously until 2004. Financial challenges and decreasing membership forced the pool to close more than 70 years after it had first opened. In 2005, the pool and surrounding land went up for sale. A year later, the Licking Land Trust put together a conservation consortium dedicated to protecting the land. According to the Licking Land Trust, the consortium included "members of the Roberts family and their business interests, Denison University, Park National Bank, the Granville Township Trustees, and the State of Ohio through its Clean Ohio Green Space Conservation Program." The Licking Land Trust succeeded in acquiring the land, which is now a dedicated natural area in perpetuity. The property is managed by the Granville Recreation District.

== Activities ==
Spring Valley Nature Preserve has a passive recreation system for visitors. A passive recreation system supports activities that have minimum impact on the environment.
