= Kettle (landform) =

Depression formed by glaciers or floodwaters

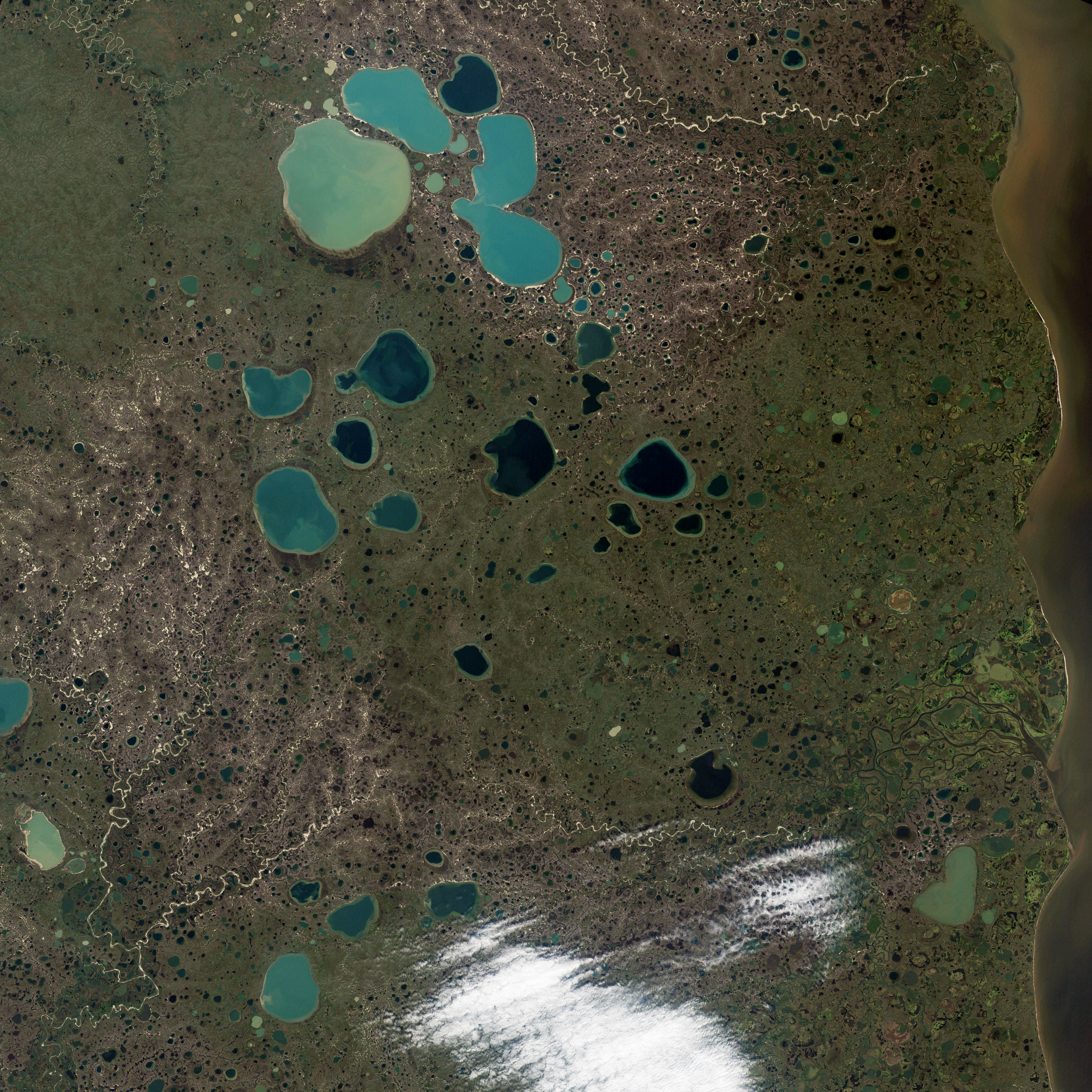
Satellite image of kettle lakes in Yamal Peninsula (Northern Siberia), adjacent to the Gulf of Ob (right). The lake colors indicate amounts of sediment or depth.

A kettle (also known as a kettle hole, kettlehole, pothole, or, in parts of the United Kingdom, pingo) is a depression or hole in an outwash plain formed by retreating glaciers or draining floodwaters. The kettles are formed as a result of blocks of dead ice left behind by retreating glaciers, which become surrounded by sediment deposited by meltwater streams as there is increased friction. The ice becomes buried in the sediment and when the ice melts, a depression is left called a kettle hole, creating a dimpled appearance on the outwash plain. Lakes often fill these kettles; these are called kettle hole lakes. Another source is the sudden drainage of an ice-dammed lake and when the block melts, the hole it leaves behind is a kettle. As the ice melts, ramparts can form around the edge of the kettle hole. The lakes that fill these holes are seldom more than 10 m (33 ft) deep and eventually fill with sediment. In acidic conditions, a kettle bog may form but in alkaline conditions, it will be kettle peatland.

== Overview ==
Kettles are fluvioglacial landforms occurring as the result of blocks of ice calving from the front of a receding glacier and becoming partially to wholly buried by glacial outwash. Glacial outwash is generated when streams of meltwater flow away from the glacier and deposit sediment to form broad outwash plains called sandurs. When the ice blocks melt, kettle holes are left in the sandur. When the development of numerous kettle holes disrupt sandur surfaces, a jumbled array of ridges and mounds form, resembling kame and kettle topography. Kettle holes can also occur in ridge shaped deposits of loose rock fragments called till.

Kettle holes can form as the result of floods caused by the sudden drainage of an ice-dammed lake. These floods, called jökulhlaups, often rapidly deposit large quantities of sediment onto the sandur surface. The kettle holes are formed by the melting blocks of sediment-rich ice that were transported and consequently buried by the jökulhlaups. It was found in field observations and laboratory simulations done by Maizels in 1992 that ramparts form around the edge of kettle holes generated by jökulhlaups. The development of distinct types of ramparts depends on the concentration of rock fragments contained in the melted ice block and on how deeply the block was buried by sediment.

Most kettle holes are less than two kilometres in diameter, although some in the U.S. Midwest exceed ten kilometres. Puslinch Lake in Ontario, Canada, is the largest kettle lake in Canada spanning 160 hectares (400 acres). Fish Lake in the north-central Cascade Mountains of the U.S. state of Washington is 200 hectares (490 acres).

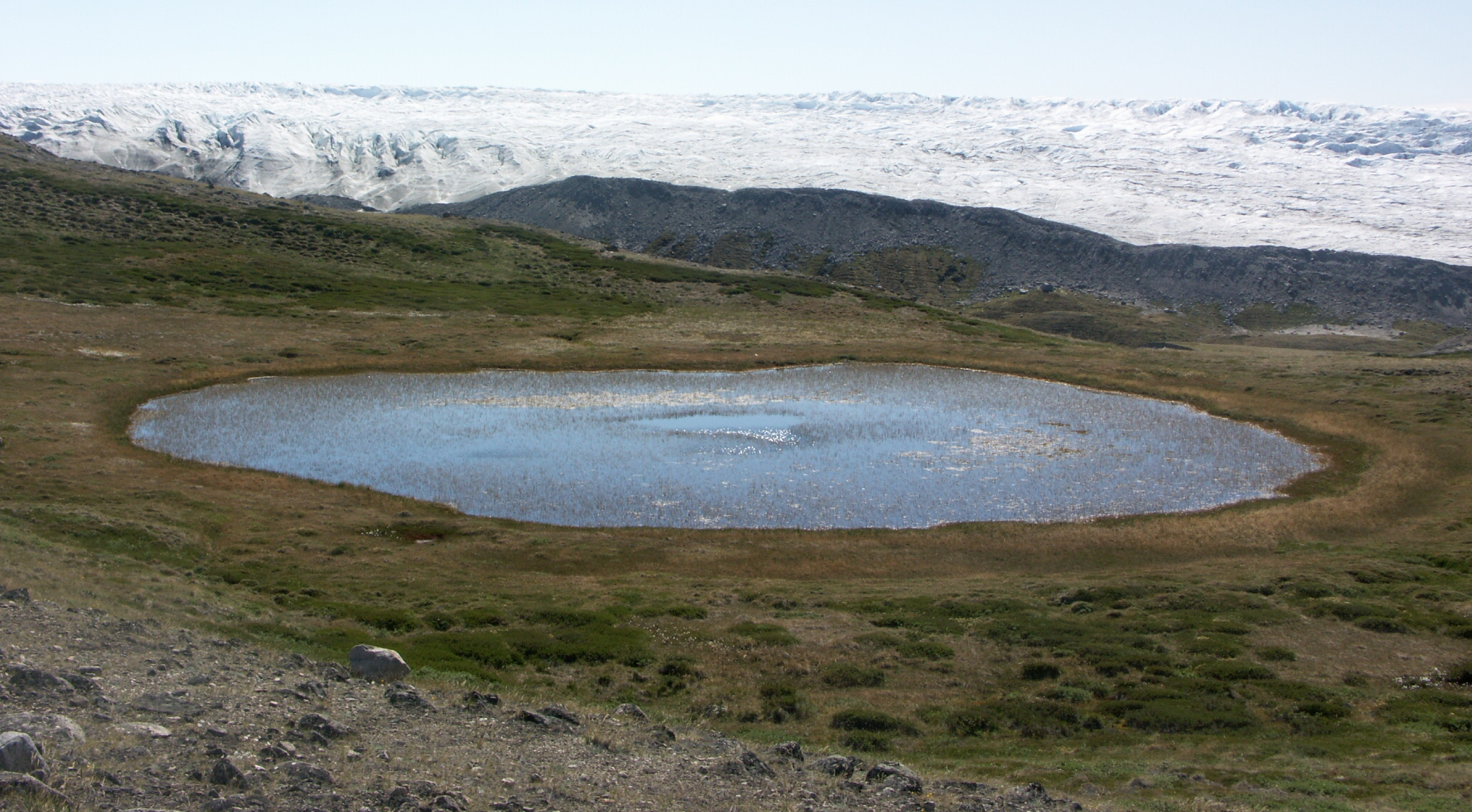
A kettle in the Isunngua highland, central-western Greenland

The depth of most kettles is less than ten meters. In most cases, kettle holes eventually fill with water, sediment, or vegetation. If the kettle is fed by surface or underground rivers or streams, it becomes a kettle lake. If the kettle receives its water from precipitation, the groundwater table, or a combination of the two, it is termed a kettle pond or kettle wetland, if vegetated. Kettle ponds that are not affected by the groundwater table will usually become dry during the warm summer months, in which case they are deemed ephemeral.

== Bogs ==
If water in a kettle becomes acidic due to decomposing organic plant matter, it becomes a kettle bog; or, if underlying soils are lime-based and neutralize the acidic conditions somewhat, it becomes a kettle peatland. Kettle bogs are closed ecosystems because they have no water source other than precipitation. Acidic kettle bogs and fresh water kettles are important ecological niches for some symbiotic species of flora and fauna.

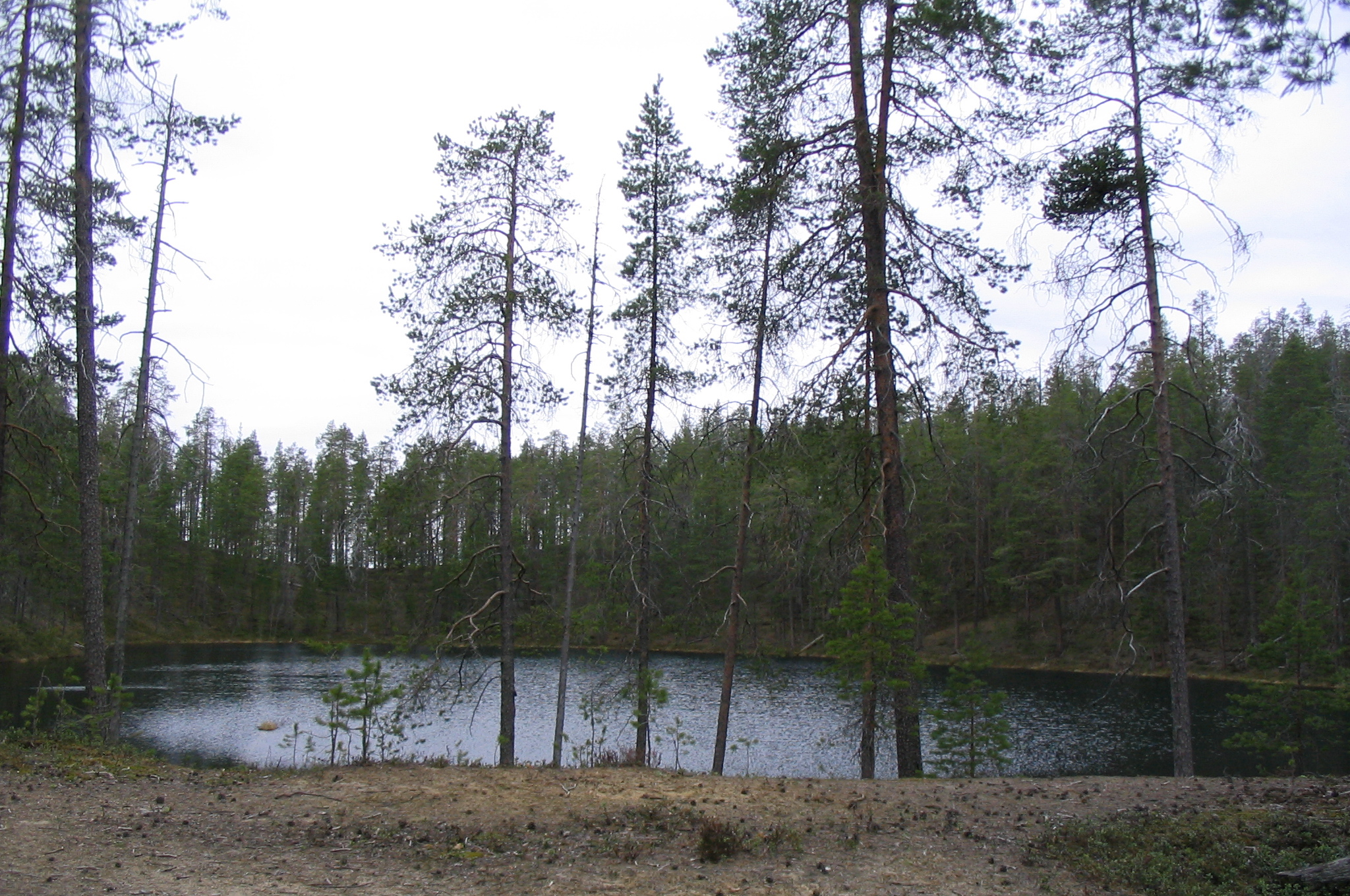
A kettle pond in the Hossa hiking area, Suomussalmi, Finland

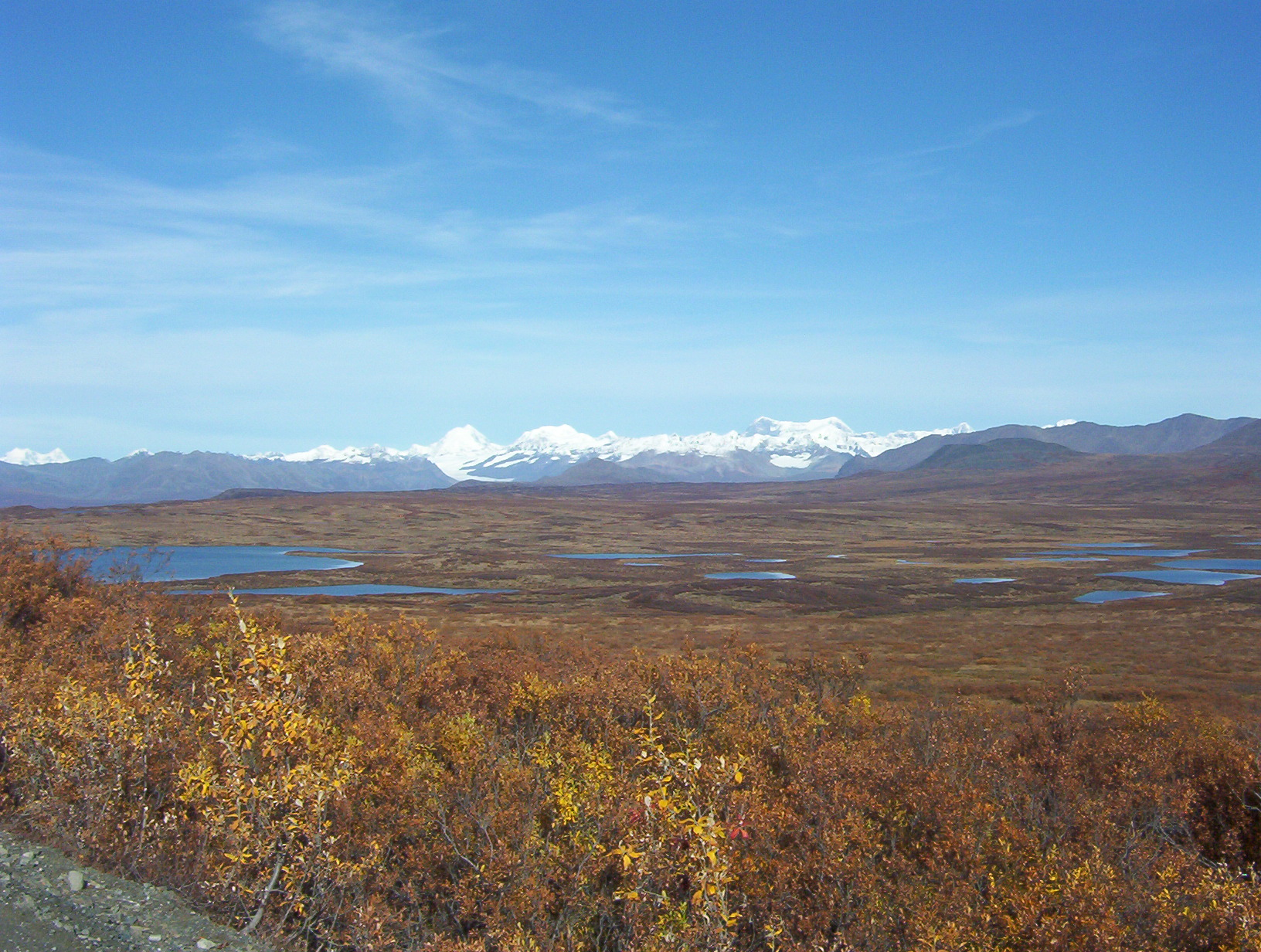
Numerous kettle lakes border the Denali Highway in Alaska

The Kettle Moraine, a region of Wisconsin covering an area from Green Bay to south-central Wisconsin, has numerous kettles, moraines and other glacial features. It has many kettle lakes, some of which are 100 to 200 feet (61 m) deep.

== Examples ==
The Prairie Pothole Region extends from northern Alberta, Canada to Iowa, United States and includes thousands of small sloughs and lakes.

- Austria
  - Meerauge, Bodental
  - Zmulner See, Carinthia (Kärnten)
- Canada
  - Ontario
    - Algonquin Park, Spruce Bog trail
    - Bond Lake
    - Heart Lake
    - Kettle Lakes Provincial Park
    - Lake Wilcox
    - Musselman Lake
    - Preston Lake
    - Puslinch Lake
  - New Brunswick
    - MacLaren Pond, Fundy National Park
- Finland
  - Syvyydenkaivo, Rokua National Park
- Germany
  - Eggstätter Seen, Bayern
  - Müggelsee, Berlin
  - Oberwaldbacher See, Bayern
  - Osterseen, Bayern
  - Schluisee, Bayern
  - Seeoner Seen, Bayern
  - Teupitzer See, Brandenburg
  - Tüttensee, Bayern
  - Ukleisee, Schleswig-Holstein
  - Weisser See, Berlin
- India
  - Sela Pass, Arunachal Pradesh
- New Zealand
  - Lake Matheson
- United Kingdom
  - England
    - Aqualate Mere, Staffordshire
    - Barelees Pond, Northumberland
    - Breckland, Norfolk/Suffolk called pingo ponds.
    - Bomere Pool, Shropshire
    - Campfield Kettle Hole, Northumberland
    - Hatchmere, Cheshire
    - Talkin Tarn, Cumbria
    - Tarn Wadling, Cumbria
    - Wormingford Mere, Essex
  - Scotland
    - Belston Loch
    - Blae Loch
    - Helenton Loch
    - Loch Brown
    - Loch Fergus
    - Loch Morlich
- United States
  - Illinois
    - Volo Bog
  - Indiana
    - Pinhook Bog
  - Iowa
    - Clear Lake
  - Massachusetts
    - Cliff Pond
    - Fresh Pond
    - Jamaica Pond
    - Houghton's Pond
    - Scargo Lake
    - Spy Pond
    - Walden Pond
  - Geology of Michigan
    - Heart Lake
    - Tee Lake
    - Thumb Lake
    - Walled Lake
  - New Hampshire
    - Philbrick-Cricenti Bog
    - Ponemah Bog
    - Spruce Hole Bog
  - New York
    - Artist Lake
    - Lake Success
    - Mendon Ponds
    - Ronkonkoma Lake
    - Round Lake, Saratoga County
  - Ohio
    - Aurora Lake
    - Brady Lake
    - Calamus Swamp
    - Geauga Lake
    - Lake Anna, Barberton Ohio
    - Lake Kelso
    - Stage's Pond State Nature Preserve
    - Triangle Lake Bog, Ravenna
  - Pennsylvania
    - Conneaut Lake
  - Rhode Island
    - Ell Pond
  - Washington
    - Fish Lake
    - Whidbey Island
  - Wisconsin
    - Elkhart Lake
    - Mauthe Lake
    - Kettle Moraine
- Venezuela
  - Kettle Mucubají

== See also ==
- Glacial landforms
- Pothole (landform)
- Pingo
- Pond
- Kame
