= Chiemgau impact hypothesis =

Obsolete scientific theory

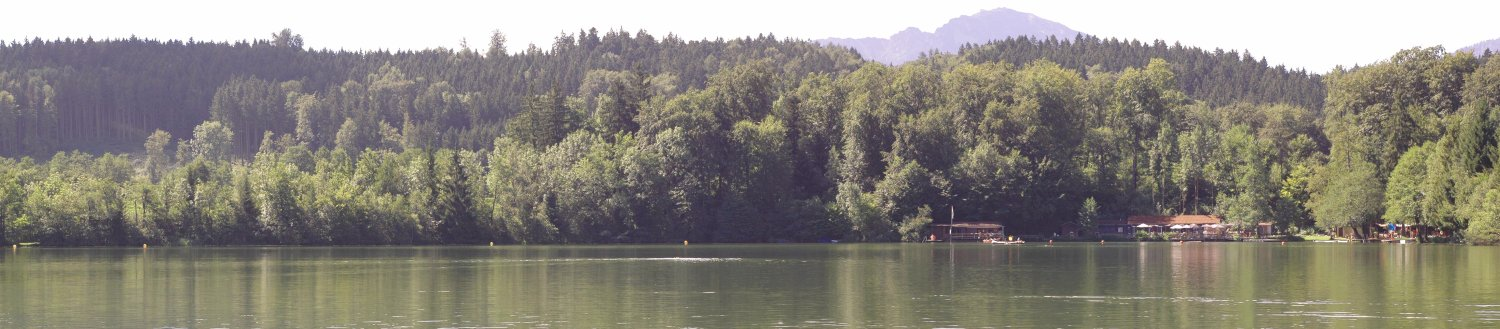
Tüttensee

Chiemgau impact hypothesis is an obsolete scientific theory that claimed the Tüttensee lake in southern Bavaria, Germany, to be the result of a Holocene meteorite impact. This claim has been refuted by geological research and the finding of a soil horizon of undisturbed peat and sedimentation since the end of the last glaciation period. The lake is in fact one of many kettles under the foothills of the Bavarian alps.

The claims of an impact crater had been raised by a team of hobby-archaeologists, calling themselves the CIRT (Chiemgau impact research team), and have resulted in some media reports in Germany and discussions in the local tourism industry, but are not accepted beyond the CIRT team today.
