= Lake Wilcox =

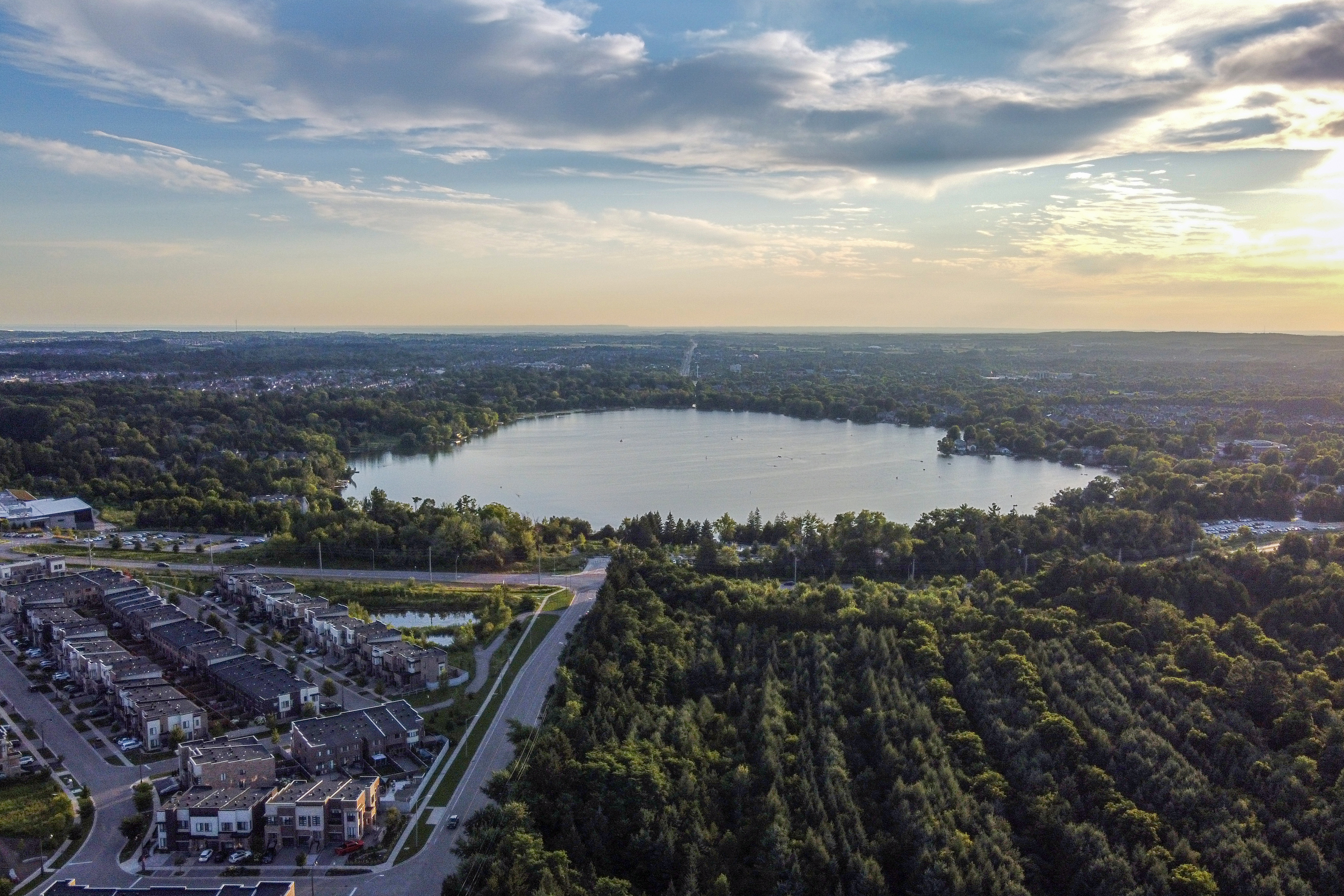
- Aerial view of Lake Wilcox in 2024

- Location within Ontario
- Location: Richmond Hill, Ontario
- Coordinates: 43°56′56.69″N 79°26′9.45″W
- Type: Kettle lake
- Basin countries: Canada
- Surface area: 137 acres (0.55 km^{2})
- Max. depth: 17.4 metres (57 ft)

Lake Wilcox is a kettle lake in the Oak Ridges neighbourhood of Richmond Hill, Ontario, Canada. The lake measures 1.5 kilometers across and covers 55.6 hectares or 0.55 square kilometres, making it the largest kettle lake on the Oak Ridges Moraine. Lake Wilcox, Lake St. George and their associated wetlands form a "provincially significant wetland".

The lake is named after William Willcocks (1735/36-1813), who was a merchant in York, Upper Canada and became mayor of Cork, Ireland in 1793 (after his return from Upper Canada). Willcocks and his family moved to Upper Canada, where his cousin Peter Russell became interim administrator after the departure of John Graves Simcoe in 1796. Willcocks "was an active land speculator" who acquired significant holdings in Upper Canada, including 800 acres (3.2 km^{2}) surrounding the lake. The name of the lake was originally Lake Willcocks, but it was corrupted over time to its present spelling.

Willcocks resided in York and Markham, but died in the former in 1813.

== Community ==
Lake Wilcox is a local community located within Oak Ridges. The local community has an elementary school; Lake Wilcox elementary school, the Lake Wilcox Community Centre, as well as a number of local parks. Lake Wilcox and Brickworks parks are the most popular. The local community has come together through a number of tragedies, including the death of a local mother, Terri Callaway on North Lake Road, and two local teens who accidentally drowned in the lake in 2008. The now defunct Lake Wilcox Brewing Co., located in Vaughan, was named after the lake.

== History ==
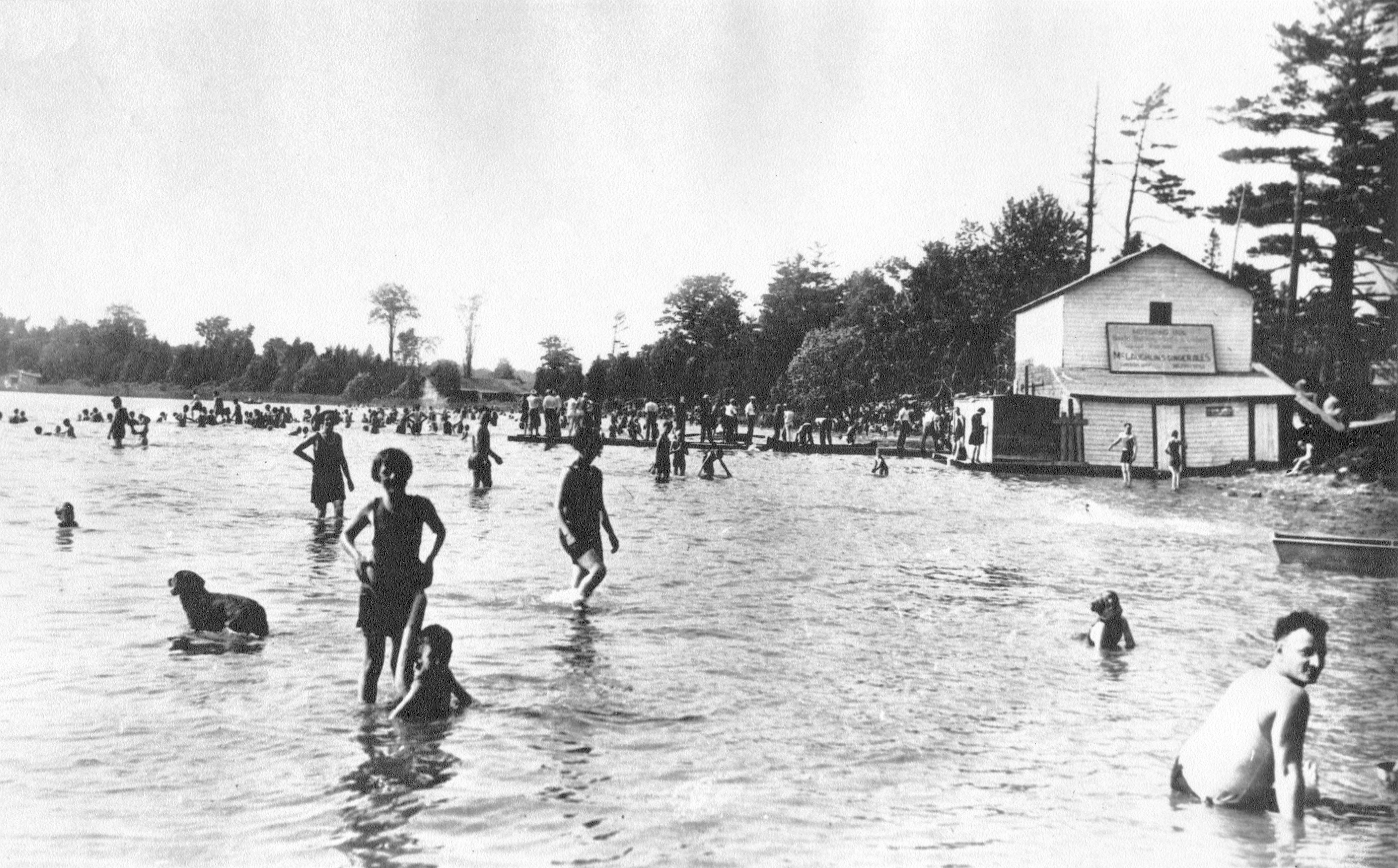
Circa 1920s

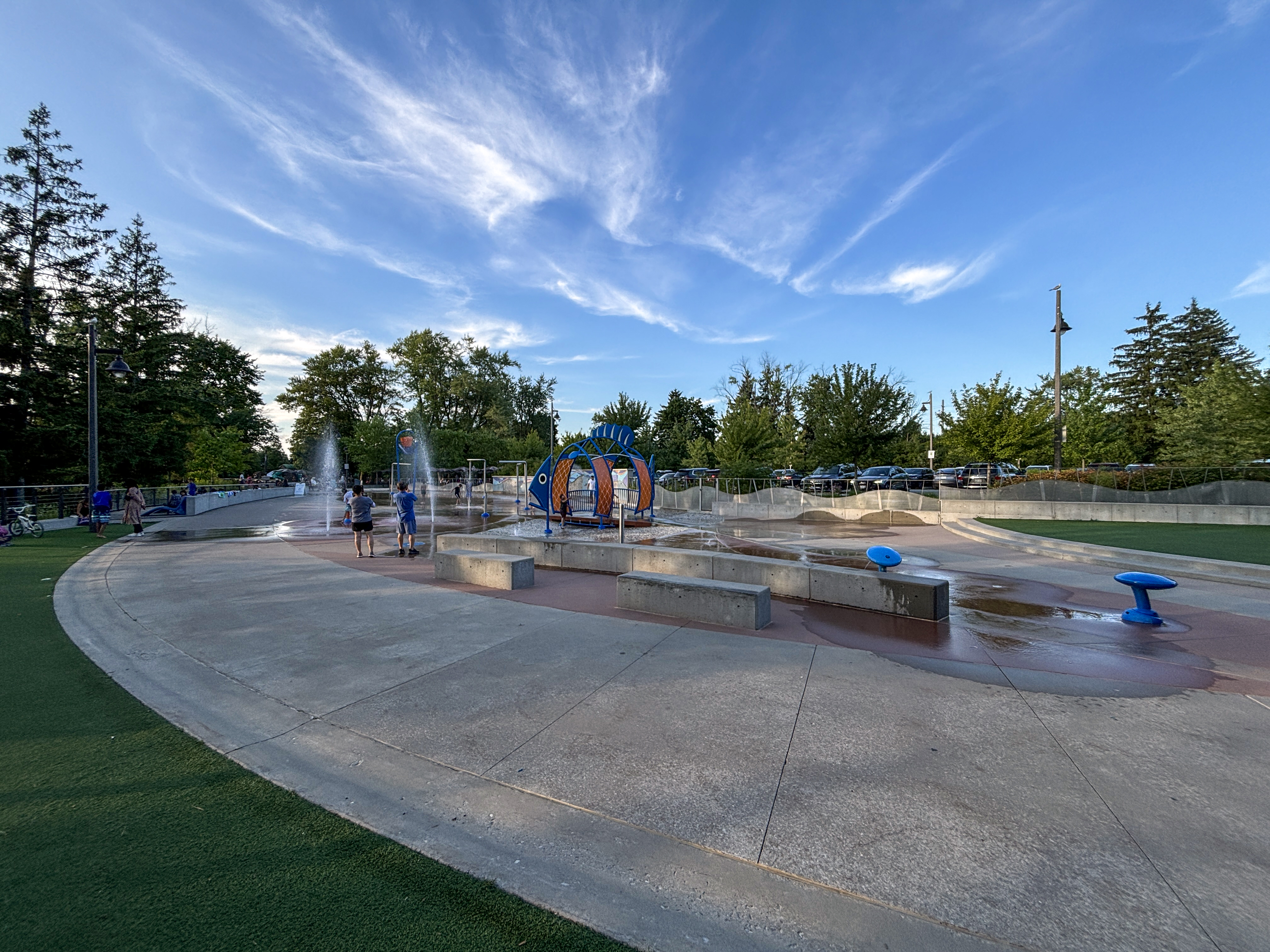
Lake Wilcox Park Splash Pad

The lake was recorded as "Lake Wilcocks" on an 1878 map in the Illustrated historical atlas of the county of York and the township of West Gwillimbury & town of Bradford in the county of Simcoe, Ont.

Housing developments began to boom around Lake Wilcox in the 1950s. Lake Wilcox, as a part of the annexation of Oak Ridges, became a part of Richmond Hill in 1971. The suburban housing developments continued until the mid to late 1980s. The developments affected the forests of the Oak Ridges Moraine which supplies water to the GTA, which caused environmental damage to Toronto. There were protests against the clear-cutting of forests of the Oak Ridges Moraine. In about 2001, Bayview began to expand to connect with the rest of Bayview. In 2002, the housing developments stopped.

== Geography ==
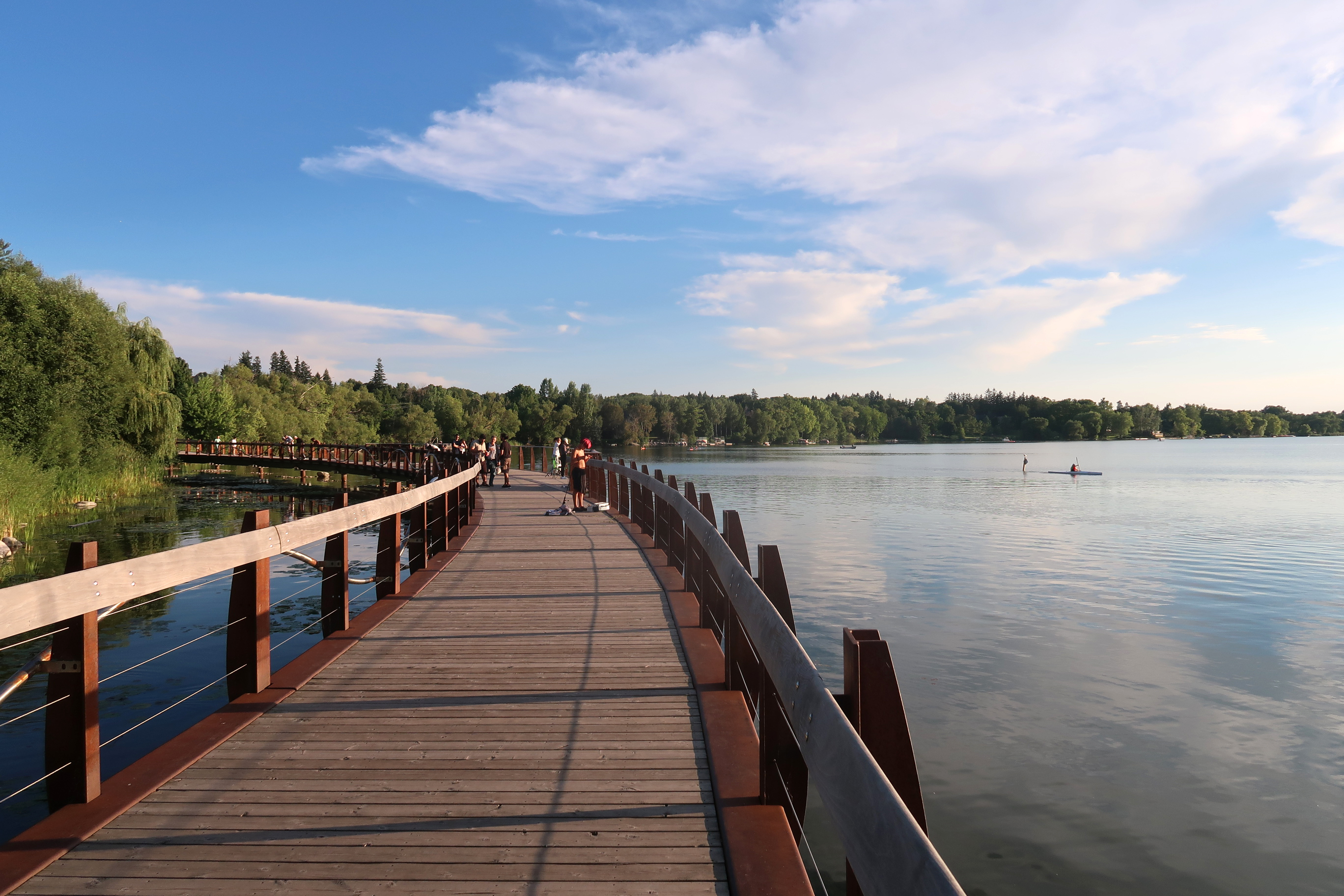
Boardwalk in Lake Wilcox Park

Lake Wilcox is part of the Humber River drainage system, draining into the East Humber River. The drainage basin of the lake covers 260 hectares. The maximum depth of the lake is 17.4 meters.

=== Wetlands complex ===
Lake Wilcox, Lake St. George, Swan Lake and Haynes Lake and their associated marshes, swamps and forests form a large wetland designated as a Provincially Significant Wetland. The total complex has some ninety individually identified wetlands, covering 102 hectares, of which 57% is classified as swamp, 39% as marsh and 4% as bog.

== Ecology ==
Beginning in 1997, the town of Richmond Hill undertook a project to restore the lake's condition, which had degraded because of pollution and development. Septic systems which had previous drained into the lake were connected to sewers and lake lungs were installed to increase oxygenation of the water. High phosphorus levels in the lake remain problematic.

=== Vegetation ===
The native coniferous trees in Lake Wilcox's watershed include white spruce, eastern hemlock, white pine, red pine, eastern white cedar and tamarack. The native deciduous trees include red maple, silver maple, sugar maple, red oak, white oak, burr oak, balsam poplar, trembling aspen, large-tooth aspen, white ash, black ash, blue ash, green ash, basswood, paper birch, pin cherry and black cherry. The native wildflowers include purple coneflower, yellow coneflower, flat-topped aster, heath aster, smooth aster, silky aster, ox-eyed susan, black-eyed susan, bluebeard lily, wood lily, trout lily, common strawberry, common milkweed, blazing star, fireweed, star flower, wild columbine and wild bergamot. Aquatic vegetation that is native to the lake itself include bulrushes, cattails, water arums, water plantains, water lilies, arrowheads, blue flag irises, smartweeds and pickeral weeds. Native shrubs found around the lake include speckled alder, smooth serviceberry, Allegheny serviceberry, nannyberry, red osier, gray dogwood, silky dogwood, broad-leaved meadowsweet, swamp rose, spicebush, buttonbush, shining willow, slender willow, black willow and pussywillow.

=== Animal life ===
Indigenous animal life includes muskrats, great horned owls and painted turtles. Some fish and bird species also thrive in the lake, including largemouth bass, various sunfishes, yellow perch, crappie, perch, and northern pike.

== Human usage ==
The town of Richmond Hill maintains three municipal recreational parks along the shores of Lake Wilcox. These are Jesse Vanek Park, Lake Wilcox Park (previously known as Sunset Beach Park), and North Shore Parkette. The Lake Wilcox Fish and Wildlife Refuge is left in a natural state. The lake itself is used for fishing, windsurfing, kayaking, and boating.

== See also ==
Other kettle lakes and bodies of water near Lake Wilcox:

- Philips Lake at MacLeod's Landing
- Bond Lake (Ontario), spring fed lake was home to recreation park in late 19th and early 20th centuries
- Preston Lake - kettle lake
- Lake St. George
