= Cornhill-on-Tweed =

Village in Northumberland, England

Coordinates: 55.648°N 2.216°W

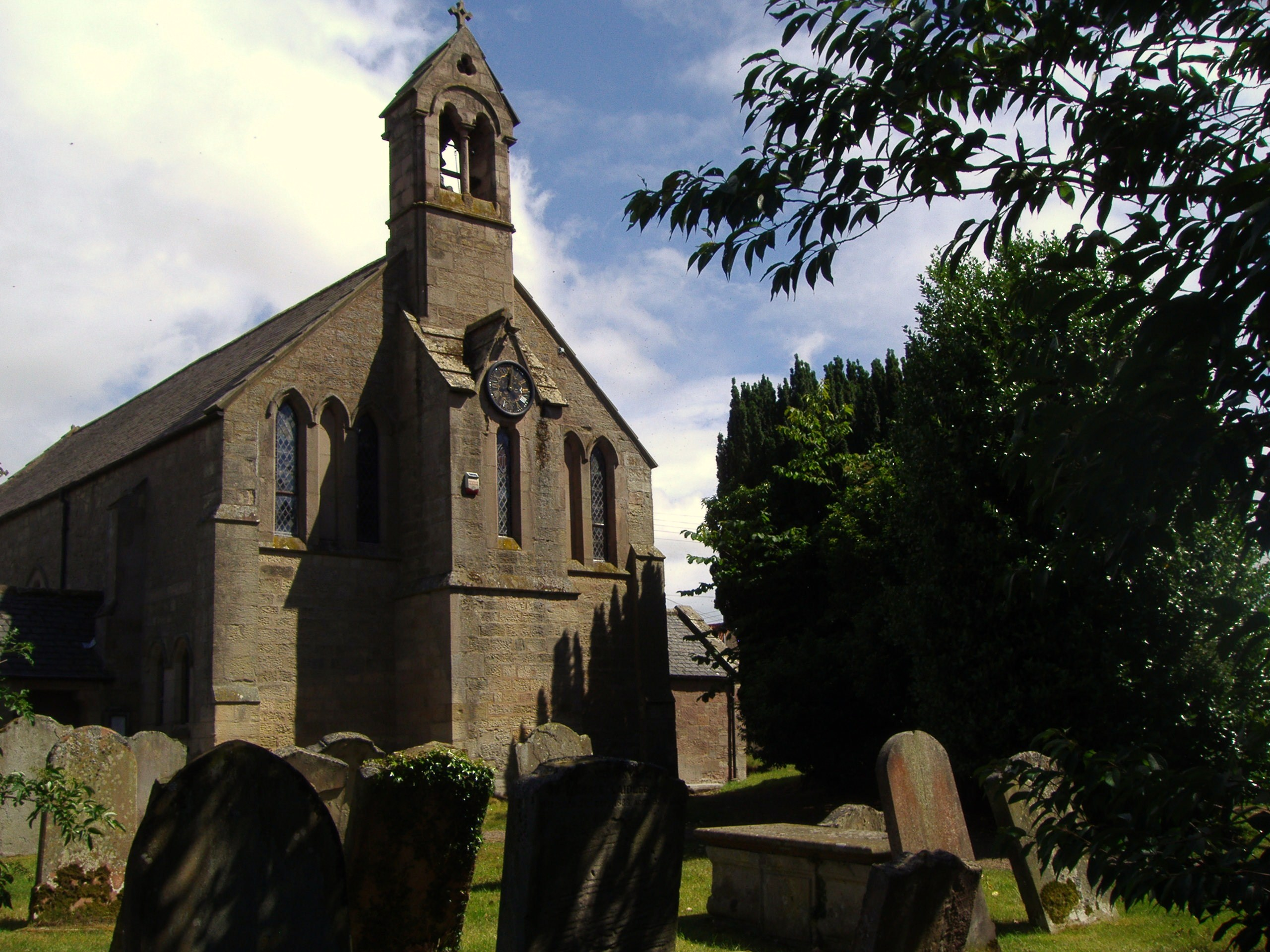

- Location within Northumberland
- Population: 347 (2011 census)
- OS grid reference: NT865395
- Unitary authority: Northumberland
- Ceremonial county: Northumberland
- Region: North East
- Country: England
- Sovereign state: United Kingdom
- Post town: CORNHILL-ON-TWEED
- Postcode district: TD12
- Dialling code: 01890
- Police: Northumbria
- Fire: Northumberland
- Ambulance: North East
- UK Parliament: North Northumberland

Cornhill-on-Tweed is a small village and civil parish in Northumberland, England about 1 mile (1.6 km) to the east of Coldstream, Scotland. The hamlets of West Learmouth and East Learmouth are located to the south and west of the village respectively. In 2011 the parish had a population of 347.

== History ==
Cornhill on Tweed was part of the Norham and Islandshires district, an exclave of the County of Durham until united with Northumberland in 1884. It had been part of the Bishopric of Durham since it was gifted to Lindisfarne Abbey by King Oswald of Northumbria in 634.

=== Early and medieval history ===
The earliest documented references to the village are in The History and Antiquities of the County of Durham where a William de Cornale is mentioned in 1239. A Henricus de Cornale is mentioned in the Durham Tithe Rolls in 1306.

By 1328 the village ownership was split between the Heron and Grey families. Sir Robert Grey of Cornhill, the son of Sir Thomas Grey of Castle Heaton, died in 1334 leaving a manor, half of a corn mill, half of a fishery, a brewery and a maltings to his son, also Robert. This Robert died in 1338. His heir was his 2-year-old daughter Maria. Because of her minority the land reverted to the Bishopric until her son, Robert Swinhoe reached his majority in 1382.

In 1385 as part of the Hundred Years War, a Franco-Scottish force under the command of Jean de Vienne along with his allies the Earls of Douglas, March and Fife destroyed Wark and Cornhill Castles. Cornhill Castle was situated a mile north-west of the village and was probably a motte and bailey in the Norman pattern. Subsequent references to a Cornhill Tower in 1415, 1496 and 1541 are attributed by Historic England to the Castle site. However Dodds in Bastions and Belligerents and Tomlinson in a Comprehensive Guide to Northumberland contend that the Castle was never rebuilt and the references to Cornhill Tower relate to the site of Cornhill House. It is known that Cornhill Tower was built by William Swinhoe between 1385 and 1415 and that Cornhill House was the home of the Swinhoes up till the 17th century. It seems unlikely that the Tower would have been built remotely from the family home. The Swinhoe family were paid by the Crown to maintain a garrison force for the defence of the border consisting of 20 horsemen.

=== 16th century ===
Cornhill was in the path of James IV's invading army on its way to the Battle of Flodden in 1513, and Cornhill Tower was damaged.

The Swinhoe family were probably Catholic, and supported the Pilgrimage of Grace in 1536 against Henry VIII but escaped retribution. From 1543 the Cornhill garrison played an active part in the Rough Wooing cross border raids into Scotland.

In 1548, following the Battle of Pinkie Cleugh near Musselburgh the previous year, Cornhill Tower was attacked and looted by a Franco-Scottish Force under the command of Andre de Montalembert, Seigneur de Esse relieving the house of its store of salted salmon.

In 1557 the Tower, now surrounded by a defensive barmkin wall, was again attacked by a Franco-Scottish army, this time opposing the rule of Mary I. During the attack William Swinhoe was killed and the garrison taken prisoner.

In 1569 the Swinhoes were once more in rebellion against the Crown supporting the Northern Earls Rebellion against Elizabeth I. Again they were able to escape royal retribution.

Cornhill House, a Grade II* listed building, is at the western end of the village, overlooking the River Tweed. The present house dates from the 16h century and was remodelled in the 18th century. It replaced an earlier building damaged by the Scottish invasions in 1385 and 1549.

=== 17th century ===
Gilbert Swinhoe of Cornhill was the High Sheriff of Northumberland in 1642 at the outbreak of the English Civil War and raised the posse comitatus in support of the King. Gilbert and his son James took an active part in the fighting with Gilbert perishing in the Tower of London following arrest. After the war James was fined for his part in the conflict and it is likely that the Cornhill estate was sold to the Foster family in 1651 to pay the penalty.

The Foster family were another of the landed gentry families of North Northumberland and owned the Cornhill estate till 1763 at which point it passed to the Collingwoods. The Collingwood family remained in possession of the Cornhill Estate through to 1975 at which point the last Collingwood, John HF Collingwood, died and the estate was split up. During their tenure the Collingwood Arms was built and the war memorial at the entrance to Cornhill House was erected.

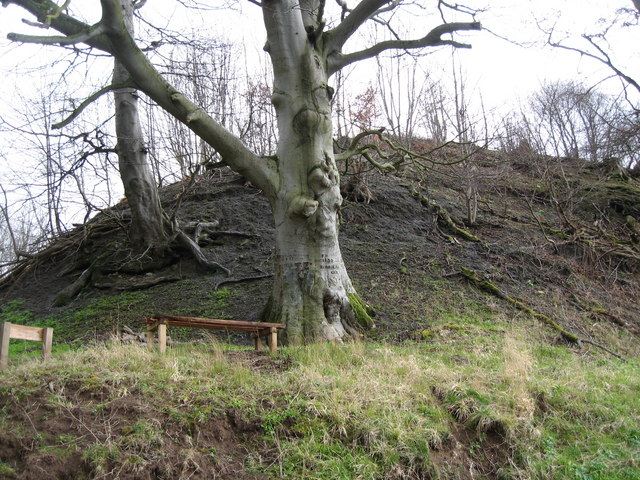
Cornhill Castle mound

== Religion ==
In the centre of the town lies St Helen's Church, part of the parish of Cornhill-on-Tweed. Its sister churches are in Carham and Branxton.

There has been a church on the site since Saxon times. The present church was built in 1840 by Ignatius Bonomi, incorporating masonry from the previous church building, which dated from 1751. The coat of arms of the Collingwood family is carved into the church parapet. Local legend has it that in 1840, when the Church was enlarged, an 8 ft man was found buried under the nave.

== Transport ==
Cornhill-on-Tweed lies at a junction of the A697 and A698 roads - the latter linking to Berwick-upon-Tweed, the nearest significant town, some 13 miles (21 km) away.

== Education ==
The Cornhill School was built in 1837 and closed in 2012. Pupils from the village now attend schools nearby.

== See also ==
- Cornhill Branch
- Campfield Kettle Hole and Barelees Pond - Sites of Special Scientific Interest 0.7 miles (1.1 km) south, and 0.95 miles (1.53 km) south-east of Cornhill.
- Heaton Castle, an historic small castle, the remains of which now form part of a large farmhouse called "Castle Heaton".
- https://www.cornhillsocialhistory.org.uk/PDF/Cornhill_House.pdf
