= Spruce Hole Bog =

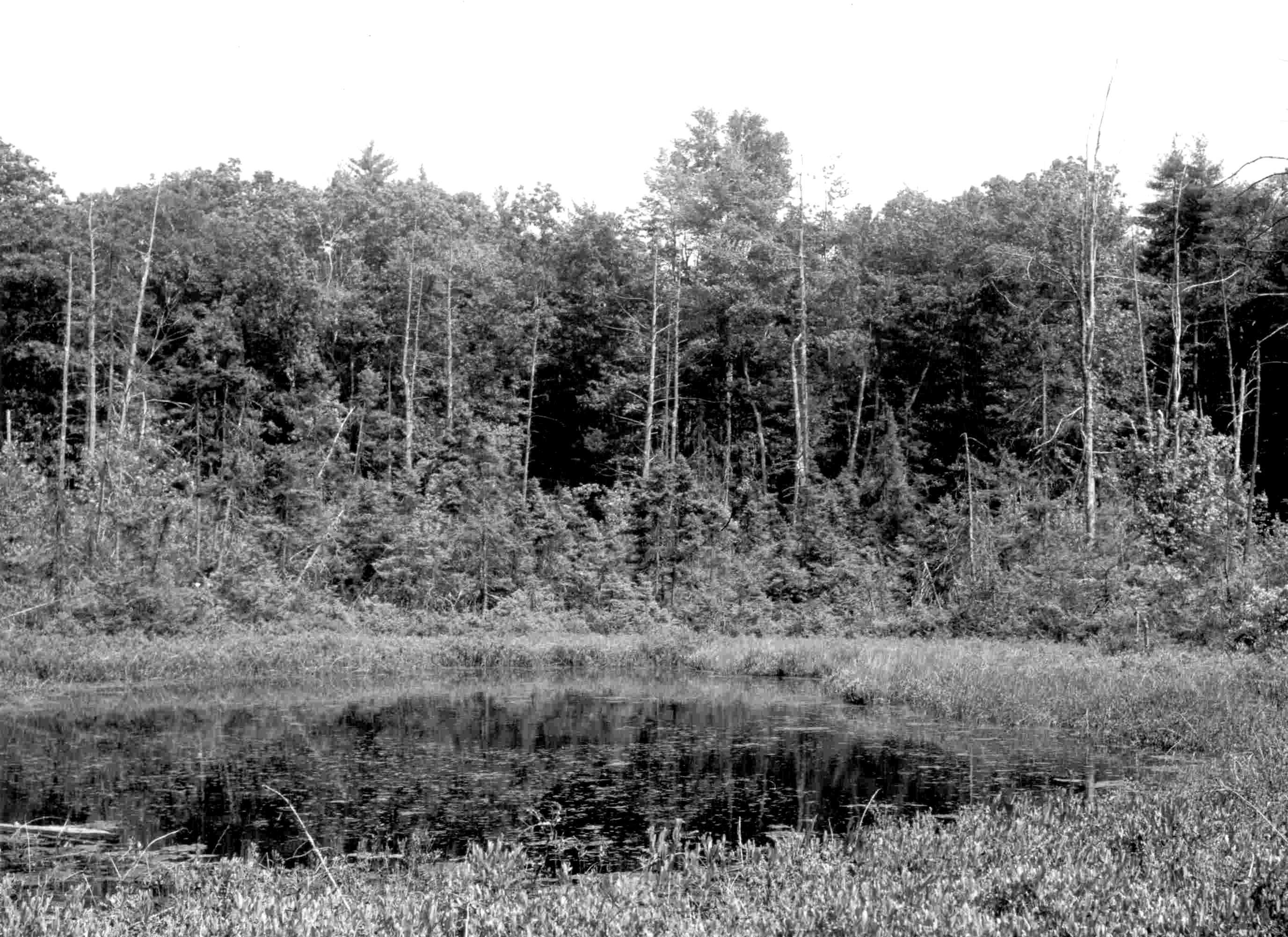
- The Spruce Hole Bog

- Location within New Hampshire
- Location: Durham, New Hampshire
- Coordinates: 43°07′34″N 70°58′04″W

U.S. National Natural Landmark
- Designated: 1972

The Spruce Hole Bog, locally known as Spruce Hole, is a complete ecological community occupying a true kettle hole in the town of Durham, New Hampshire, United States. According to the National Register of Natural Landmarks: "It illustrates characteristics of a typical sphagnum-heath bog, localized in a specialized geologic setting." It was designated a National Natural Landmark in 1972. Spruce Hole is located 2 miles (3 km) west of the town center of Durham and is owned by the town, which has conserved 35 acres (14 ha) around it. It is reached by a woods road off Packer's Falls Road, and despite the name, the surrounding forest is mostly white pine, hemlock, and birch.

The bog is also adjacent to the Oyster River Forest, a permanently conserved 172-acre (70 ha)+ parcel owned by the town of Durham.
