= Tüttensee =

German lake

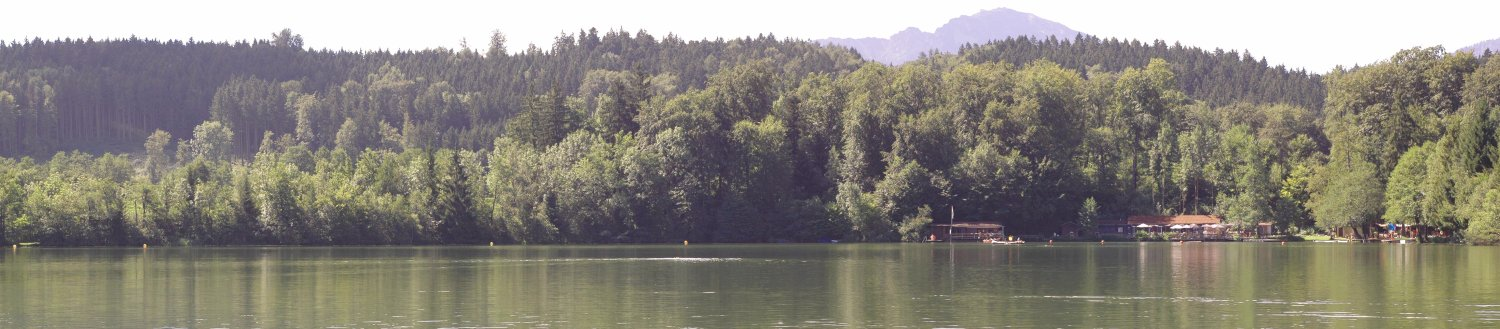
- View over the Tüttensee, looking south towards the public beach

- Location within Germany
- Location: Bavaria, Germany
- Coordinates: 47°50′46.82″N 12°34′5.98″E
- Type: Lake
- Primary outflows: Marwanger Bach -> Grabenstätter Mühlbach -> Chiemsee
- Catchment area: 0.8 square kilometres (0.31 sq mi)
- Surface area: 10.8 hectares (27 acres)
- Average depth: 9.4 metres (31 ft)
- Max. depth: 17.3 metres (57 ft)
- Water volume: 1,020,000 cubic metres (36,000,000 cu ft)
- Shore length^{1}: 1,280 metres (4,200 ft)
- Surface elevation: 523 metres (1,716 ft)
- Website: https://www.tuettensee-seebad.de/
- ^{1} Shore length is not a well-defined measure.

The Tüttensee (Lake Tütten) is a small lake in the Chiemgau region, the Bavarian Alpine foothills of the Traunstein district, within the municipalities of Grabenstätt and Vachendorf. With an area of 10.8 ha (27 acres) and a maximum depth of 17.3 m (57 ft), it is one of many Kettle-Lakes in the alpine foothills, that resulted from remnants of dead ice after a glacier retreated.

The lake is partly surrounded by well preserved Kame terraces and drains to the north west into the tiny Marwanger Creek to the Chiemsee. At the southern lake shore is a small public beach with an Inn and further amenities. It is one of the warmest lakes in Upper Bavaria.

Recent geological and biological research showed that the Tüttensee has an undisturbed profile of peat bog since the Würm glaciation and over more than 12.500 years since.

The recent dating of the undisturbed peak horizons refuted claims by amateur geologists, that the Tüttensee was the result of a hypothetical meteor impact within the last 4000 years.
