= Campfield Kettle Hole =

Protected area in Northumberland, England

- Site of Special Scientific Interest
- Location within Northumberland
- Location of Campfield Kettle Hole.
- Area of search: Northumberland
- Grid reference: NT862381
- Coordinates: 55.63669°N 2.22073°W
- Interest: Biological
- Area: 2.92 hectares (7.2 acres)
- Notification date: 1969
- Location map: DEFRA MAGIC map

Campfield Kettle Hole is the name given to a Site of Special Scientific Interest (SSSI) in north Northumberland, England. The site is thought to be the remains of a kettle hole, a pond formed in the void remaining after a submerged glacial calf block melted. In contemporary times Campfield Kettle Hole is a mix of bog and pond.

== Location and natural features ==
Campfield Kettle Hole is situated in the north-east of England, immediately south of the Anglo-Scottish border in the county of Northumberland, some 0.7 miles (1.1 km) south of the town of Cornhill-on-Tweed. The pond lies at 31 metres (102 ft) above sea level within mildly undulating terrain, and is some 0.09 miles (0.14 km) north-south and 0.22 miles (0.35 km) east-west. The western end is a permanent pond; the eastern-end is prone to occasional flooding; the remainder of the pond has become peat-filled.

The local area has a number of other kettle hole ponds; a second, Barelees Pond, lies 0.65 miles (1.05 km) east of Campfield.

== Vegetation ==
The kettle hole has deep waterlogged peat soils supporting a carr woodland of birch (Betula sp.) with Scot's pine (Pinus sylvestris). The woodland floor has bog-mosses (Sphagnum spp.), and hare's-tail cotton grass (Eriophorum vaginatum) with purple moor-grass (Molinia caerulea) and wavy hair-grass (Deschampsia flexuosa).

The western end of the pond is fringed with yellow iris (Iris pseudacorus), water plantain (Alisma plantago-aquatica) and willow (Salix spp). The perimeter has yellow iris and reed canary-grass (Phalaris arundinacea). The uncommon beetle Agabus uliginosus dispar has been recorded from the wetter areas of the site.

The condition of Campfield Kettle Hole was judged to be unfavourable-recovering in 2013, with previous concerns about tree encroachment settled.

== See also ==
- List of Sites of Special Scientific Interest in Northumberland
