= Kettle Lakes Provincial Park =

Provincial park in Ontario, Canada

- IUCN category II (national park)
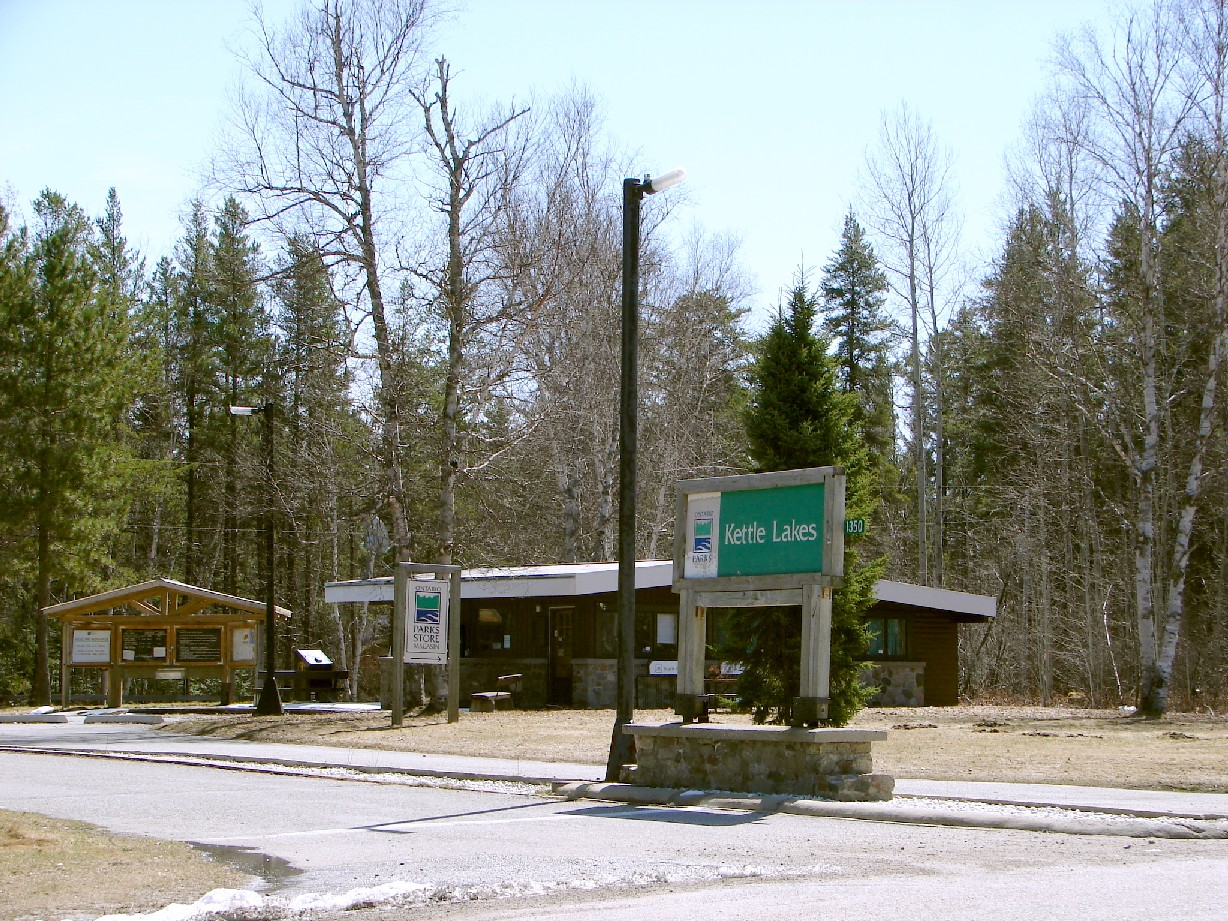
- Park entrance and visitor centre

- Location within Ontario
- Interactive map of Kettle Lakes Provincial Park
- Location: Cochrane District, Northeastern Ontario, Canada
- Nearest city: Timmins
- Coordinates: 48°34′12″N 80°52′12″W
- Area: 12.61 km^{2} (4.87 sq mi)
- Established: 1957
- Visitors: 33,046 (in 2022)
- Governing body: Ontario Parks
- Website: www.ontarioparks.ca/park/kettlelakes

Kettle Lakes Provincial Park is a provincial park in northeastern Ontario, about 30 kilometres (19 mi) east of Timmins. It is administered by Ontario Parks, which classifies it as a recreation park.

The landscape of the park is the legacy of the retreat of an enormous glacier at the end of the last Ice Age, approximately 12,000 years ago. After the glacier retreated, half-buried icebergs melted to form small, deep lakes referred to by earth scientists as kettle lakes. Twenty of the 22 lakes in Kettle Lakes Provincial Park are kettles. The retreating glacier also left eskers and erratics.

The lakes are surrounded by forests made up primarily of jack pine interspersed with balsam fir, red and white pine, and white and black spruce. Stands of deciduous trees such as trembling aspen and white birch may also be found in the park.

There are 139 campsites in the park in two campgrounds. The park is also a popular destination for canoeing, swimming at one of several sandy beaches, hiking and fishing.

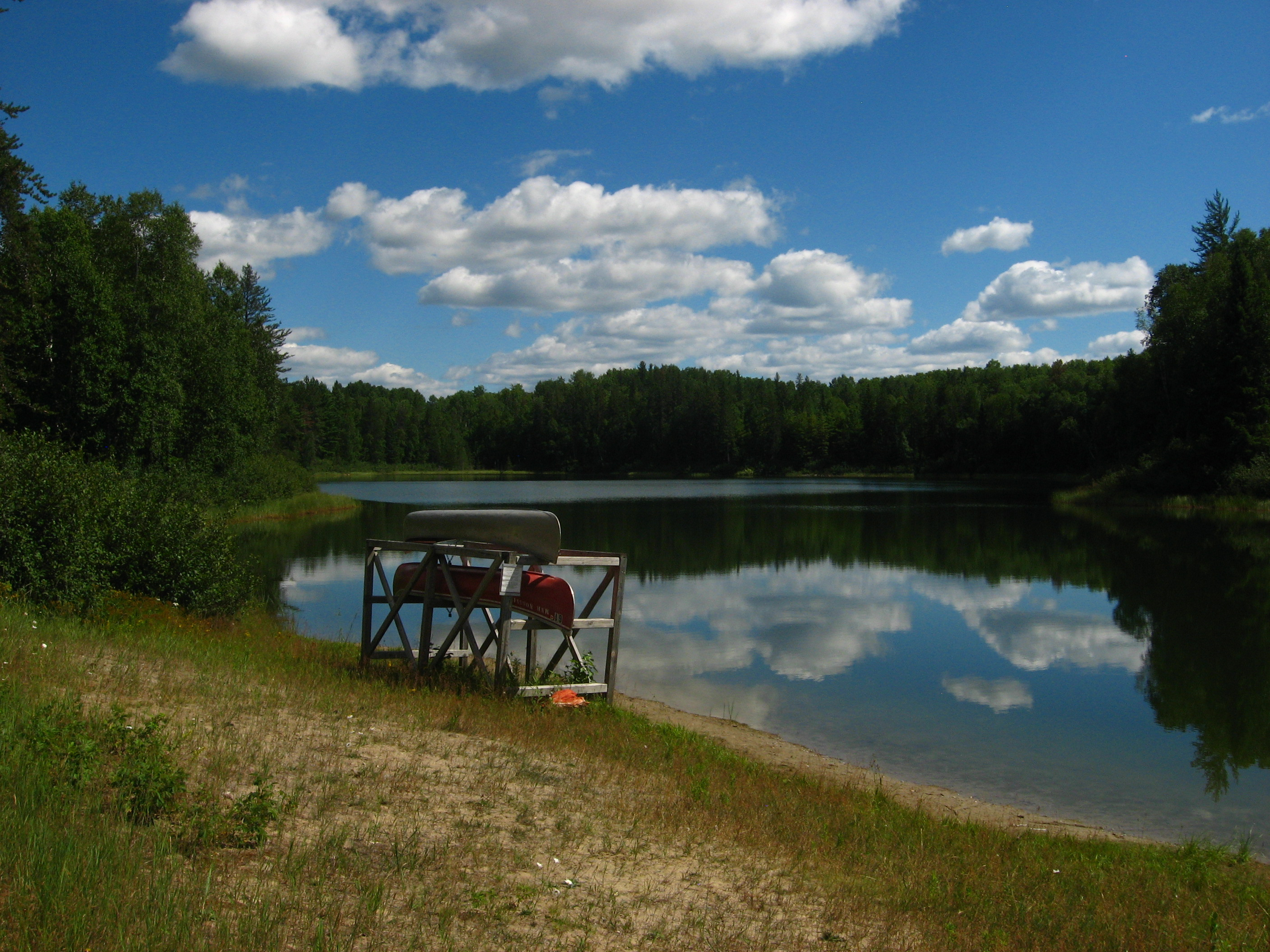
Canoes at Green Lake, one of 22 lakes in Kettle Lakes Provincial Park
