= Barelees Pond =

Protected area in Northumberland, England

- Site of Special Scientific Interest
- Location within Northumberland
- Location of Barelees Pond.
- Area of search: Northumberland
- Grid reference: NT872384
- Coordinates: 55.6392°N 2.2045°W
- Interest: Biological
- Area: 1.34 hectares (3.3 acres)
- Notification date: 1959
- Location map: DEFRA MAGIC map

Barelees Pond is the name given to a Site of Special Scientific Interest (SSSI) in north Northumberland, England. The site is a kettle hole, a deep pond formed in the void remaining after a submerged glacial calf block melted. Barelees Pond is illustrative of vegetative habitat evolution as peat sediment gradually fills the pond.

== Location and natural features ==
Barelees Pond is situated in the north-east of England, immediately south of the Anglo-Scottish border in the county of Northumberland, some 0.95 miles (1.53 km) south-east of the town of Cornhill-on-Tweed. The pond lies within mildly undulating terrain circa 45 metres (148 ft) above sea level, and is oval in shape, some 0.11 miles (0.18 km) north to south and 0.07 miles (0.11 km) east-west. An island has formed to occupy much of the south and midsections of the pond, fringed at the south by a moat of water, the substantial remains of the pond lying to the north end.

The local area has a number of other kettle hole ponds; a second, Campfield Kettle Hole, lies 0.65 miles (1.05 km) west of Barelees.

== Vegetation ==
Within the perimeter of the island is a carr woodland - in part a quaking bog floating on the pond - supporting birch (Betula sp.) with a carpet of bog mosses including Sphagnum palustre and Sphagnum recurvum. On this are found cotton-grasses such as Eriophorum angustifolium and E. vaginatum, with marsh cinquefoil (Potentilla palustris) and bogbean (Menyanthes trifoliata). The distinct stable central areas of the island supports Scot's pine (Pinus sylvestris) and a ground flora of ling (Calluna vulgaris) and cross-leaved heath (Erica tetralix). A 2009 survey found lichen (Caloplaca luteoalba ) on the birch.

The perimeter of the island supports willow (Salix spp.), marsh marigold (Caltha palustris) and bittersweet (Solanum dulcamara). The perimeter of the pond supports soft rush (Juncus effusus), greater pond sedge (Carex riparia) and water plantain (Alisma plantago-aquatica). The perimeter bank supports elder (Sambucus nigra), hawthorn (Crataegus monogyna), wild rose (Rosa sp.), rosebay willow herb (Epilobium angustifolium) and common nettle (Urtica dioica).

The condition of the geological units of Barelees Pond was judged to be favourable in 2009.

== See also ==
- List of Sites of Special Scientific Interest in Northumberland
