= Heath aster =

Heath aster is a common name for several plants native to North America and may refer to:

- Symphyotrichum ericoides
- Symphyotrichum pilosum
