= Zmulner See =

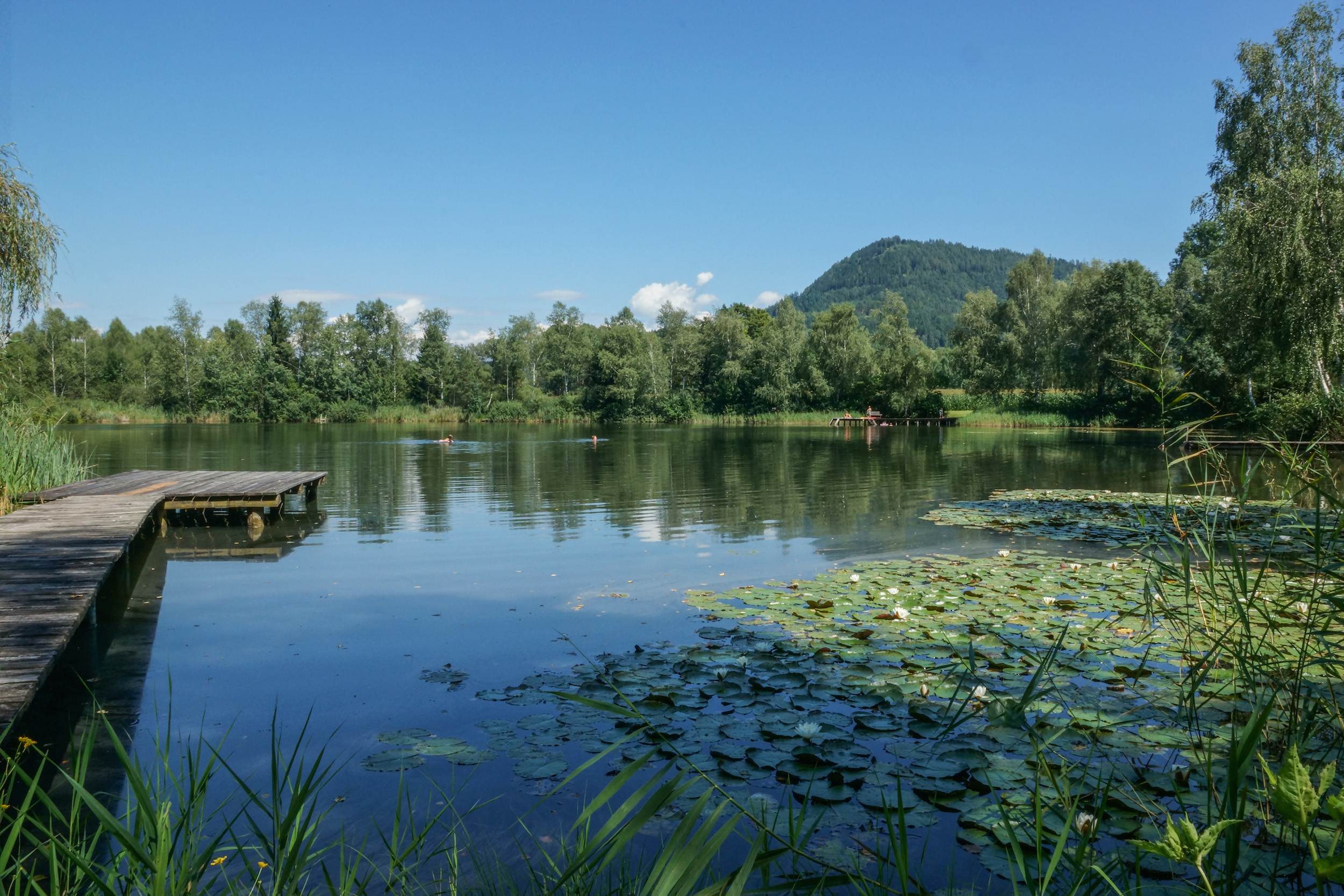

- Location within Austria
- Location: Carinthia
- Coordinates: 46°42′13″N 14°15′02″E
- Type: mire lake
- Primary outflows: to Glan River
- Catchment area: 38 ha (94 acres)
- Basin countries: Austria
- Surface area: 1.82 ha (4.5 acres)
- Water volume: 67,675 m^{3} (54.865 acre⋅ft)
- Surface elevation: 523 m (1,716 ft)
- Settlements: Zmuln

Zmulner See is a mire lake in Carinthia, Austria. It is located in the upper Glan valley, near the municipality of Liebenfels. The lake and its environment are part of a protected landscape area.
