= Bond Lake (Ontario) =

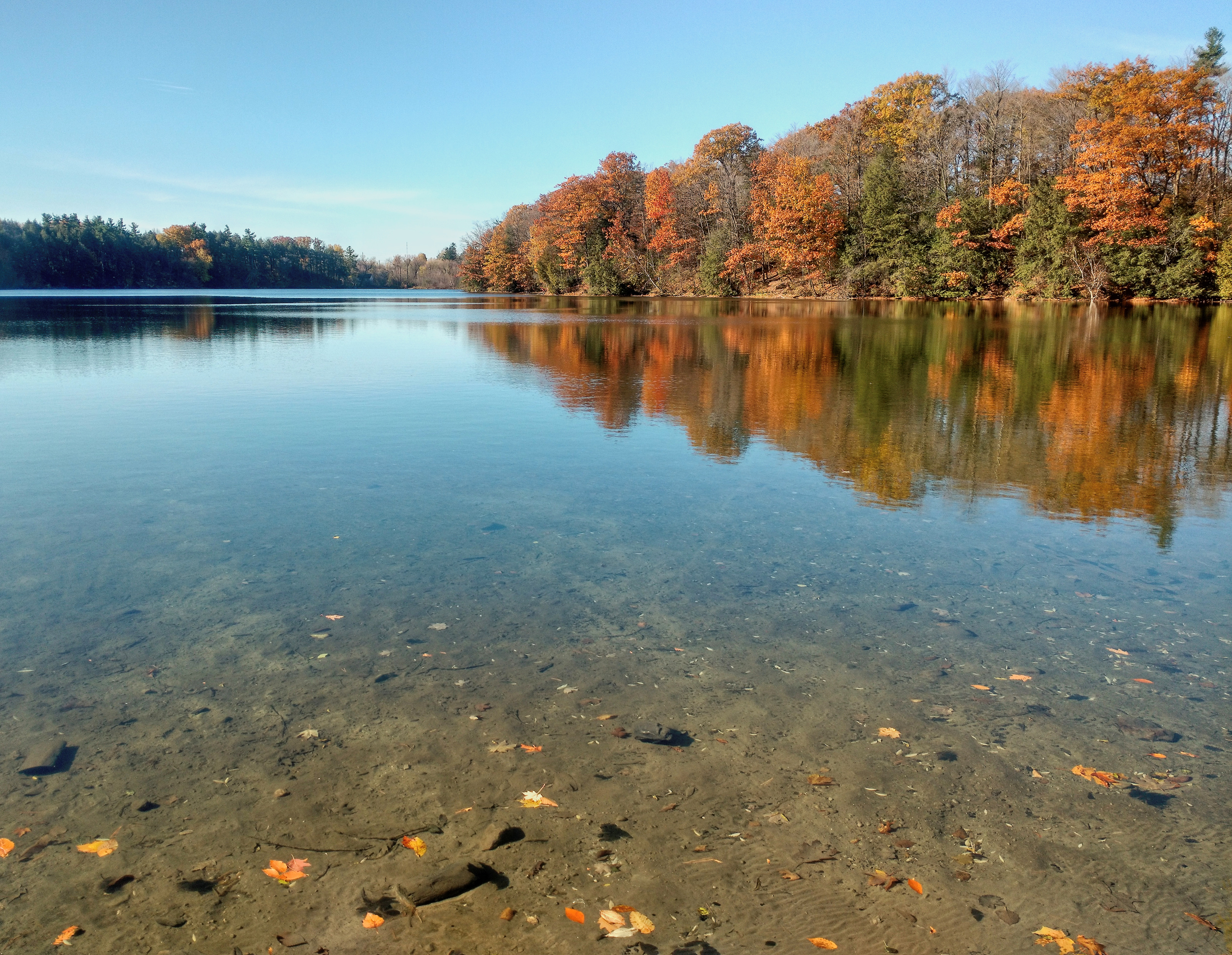
- Bond Lake seen from the eastern shore.

- Location within Ontario
- Location: Richmond Hill, Ontario
- Coordinates: 43.933°N 79.449°W
- Type: Kettle lake
- Primary inflows: Underground springs
- Basin countries: Canada
- Max. length: ~1,000 metres (3,300 ft)
- Max. width: ~200 metres (660 ft)
- Surface area: 55 acres (0.22 km^{2})
- Max. depth: 32 metres (105 ft)
- Settlements: Richmond Hill

Bond Lake is a 55-acre (22 ha) glacial kettle lake in the Oak Ridges Moraine. It is located on the east side of Yonge Street in the north end of Richmond Hill, Ontario.

== History ==
Prior to the late 1800s the lake was surrounded by farms by various land holders: Whitneys' and Mortons', (William) Websters, whom acquired from Chief Justice Sir John Robinson, 1st Baronet, of Toronto with tenant lease to James Legge. In the 1790s (1794 and 1797) 200 acres around the lake was granted to former Queen's York Rangers Sergeant William Bond. Initially called Bond's Pond and later as Bond Lake. William Bell would sell his portion to developers responsible for Bond Lake Park.

Bond Lake Park was a recreation park from 1899 to 1929 owned by the Metropolitan Street Railway (Toronto) (MSR). The park closed as the MSR was owned by the Toronto Transportation Commission (since 1922) and had little interest in owning non transit assets.

Today the lake and lands are part of a 175 acres Oakridges Corridor Conservation Reserves under the Toronto Region Conservation Authority.

== Ecology ==
Due to rapid urbanization of adjacent lands, the lake is experiencing deterioration in water quality and loss of biodiversity. The most significant factor is contaminated surface runoff, especially external phosphorus loading. The lake, together with the adjacent bog^{(which bog?)}, is designated as an Area of Natural and Scientific Interest.

=== Fish ===
The species diversity of the lake is low, due its isolated nature. The only species found in the lake are northern pike, emerald shiner, brown bullhead, banded killifish and pumpkinseed.

== See also ==
- Preston Lake
- Lake Wilcox
