= Geology of Rhode Island =

The geology of Rhode Island is based on nearly one billion year old igneous crystalline basement rocks formed as part of the microcontinent Avalonia that collided with the supercontinent Gondwana. The region experienced substantial folding associated with its landlocked position during the Alleghanian orogeny mountain building event. The region accumulated sedimentary rocks, including small deposits of coal. The region was covered with thick Atlantic Coastal Plain sediments, with the erosion of the Appalachians and the creation of the Atlantic Ocean throughout the past 200 million years. These surficial sediments and soils were substantially reworked by the Pleistocene glaciations. The state's geology is part of the broader geology of New England.

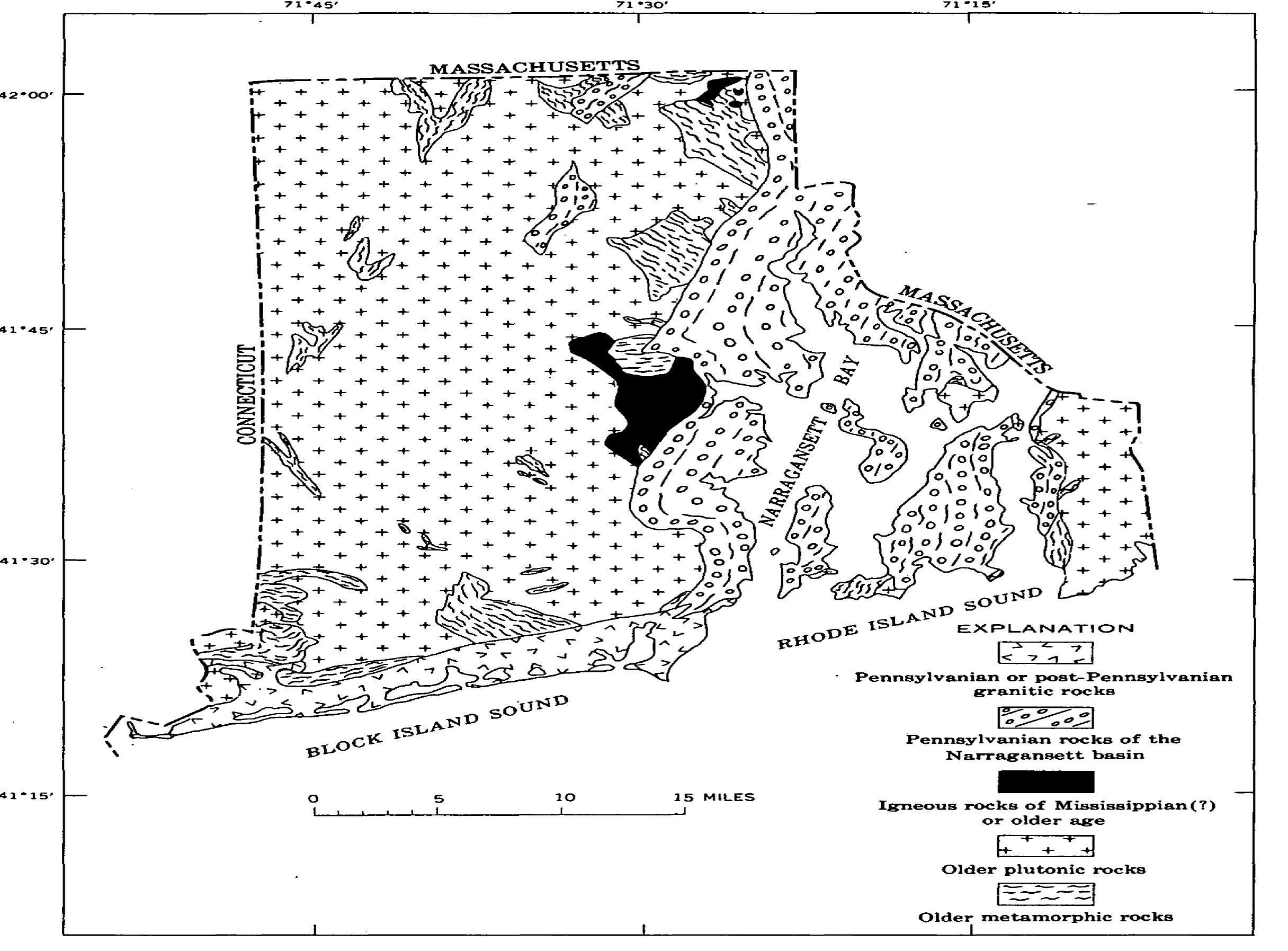
A diagram of the land forms in Rhode Island

== Physical geography ==
Rhode Island is divided into two distinct physiographic regions. The Eastern Highlands occupy the northwestern interior of the state, near the state line with Connecticut while the majority of the state's land area is grouped with the larger Atlantic Coastal Plain that extends along the eastern seaboard of the US.

== Geologic history ==
Rhode Island is the only state in New England formed entirely atop basement rock from the microcontinent Avalonia. The bedrock of Rhode Island first took shape with the emergence of a volcanic arc near a subduction on the margin of the supercontinent Gondwana, with the earliest rocks likely formed in the late Neoproterozoic.

=== Paleozoic (541-251 million years ago) ===
During the early Cambrian period, as multi-cellular life rapidly increased on Earth, Avalonian basement rocks moved northward from Gondwana following the breakup of the supercontinent Pannotia. Rhode Island became landlocked during the formation of Pangaea and experienced substantial folding during the Alleghanian orogeny leading to the creation of the Narragansett Basin. This shallow water depositional environment filled with eroded sediments and organic material. Accumulation of sediments and organic matter accelerated during the Carboniferous period, ultimately forming small coal deposits throughout the basin.

=== Mesozoic-Cenozoic (251 million years ago-present) ===
During the breakup of Pangaea Rhode Island was positioned alongside a marine environment once again as extensive erosion of the Appalachian Mountains deposited sediments out on the continental shelf, beginning the creation of the Atlantic coastal plain.

Rhode Island was glaciated in the past 2.5 million years of the Quaternary, in the Pleistocene period. The region was glaciated twice between 75,000 and 55,000 years ago. Glaciers encountered a freshwater lake in the Narragansett Bay area. The ice carved through younger sediments exposing more ancient rock. A large terminal moraine was formed in the ocean at the edge of the ice sheet during the first pulse of glaciation, creating Block Island along with Long Island, Martha's Vineyard and Nantucket. The last Wisconsin glaciation began to retreat 18,000 before the present, leaving behind a sediment strewn landscape. Much of the surficial geology of the towns of Westerly, Charlestown and Narragansett resulted from the extensive Charlestown moraine, stretching in a line from Long Island to Fishers Island to the southern coast of Rhode Island.

The region became entirely ice free by 14,000 before the present, shortly before the initial migration of humans to North America. Rhode Island has become substantially influenced by human activity since the formation of the Colony of Rhode Island and Providence Plantations in 1636.

== Bedrock geology ==
Rhode Island's bedrock is divided into six large categories. The oldest rocks are metamorphic and date to the Precambrian or early Paleozoic. Metamorphic rocks in the southwest of the state have been correlated to Cambrian and Ordovician rocks in Connecticut, while the quartzite, marble and greenschist of the Blackstone Group are common in northern Rhode Island. Other metamorphic rocks are exposed in Newport and Tiverton.

Much of the state's land area, including most of the central, western and interior areas of Rhode Island are made up of intrusive plutonic rocks from the Paleozoic. This most extensive grouping of bedrock is made up of gneiss, granite and quartz diorite. Notable examples of plutonic rock groups include Hope Valley alaskite gneiss, Metacom granite gneiss, Esmond Granite, Bulgarmarsh Granite, Ponaganset Gneiss and Scituate Granite Gneiss.

Some locations in northeastern Rhode Island and in the East Greenwich Group are granite and volcanic igneous rocks. Sedimentary rocks are common in the Narragansett Basin in North Scituate and Woonsocket, where rocks date to the Pennsylvanian and are clastic sedimentary rocks, with different levels of metamorphism.

In the southern part of the state, the Westerly Granite and Narragansett Pier Granite belong to a series of granitic rocks from the Pennsylvanian and later. The youngest bed rock is found beneath Block Island where clay and sand are exposed from the Cretaceous.

== Surficial geology and soils ==
Rhode Island's surficial geology includes sediments, soil and groundwater near the surface and lying atop the bedrock lithology. As a result of Pleistocene glaciation, much of the state is covered in glacial till including virtually all of the towns of Tiverton, Middletown, Newport, Portsmouth, Bristol, Jamestown, Burrilville and Foster. Glacial outwash dominates in Providence, Pawtucket, Cranston, Woonsocket, Pawtucket, Warwick and sections of the coast and interior.

The soils of Rhode Island are a part of the state's surficial geology, but are often studied separately because of their role in development planning, construction and agriculture. Approximately 65% of the soils developed are from glacial till. Most soils are loamy sand and sandy loam, with medium or coarse textured grains of acid crystalline rock. A narrow strip along the western shore of Narragansett Bay originated from Carboniferous rocks including slate and shale. The soils on the western shore are dark colored, silt loam. Twenty percent of soil in Rhode Island resulted from glacial outwash and tend to be thick, well sorted layers of sediment with stratified layers of sand and gravel. The remaining soil in the state are 10% fine, wind-blown loess sediments that range from 6 inches to 4 feet in thickness, with an average thickness of 30 inches. Loess soils hold large quantities of water and are deemed high quality agricultural soils. An additional 5% of soils entirely organic, forming in freshwater wetlands, with thicknesses between one foot and 20 feet. Only 1% of soils are found in saltwater marshes, with 16 inches of organic material layered over sand.

== History of geologic research ==
Rhode Island was an early site of geologic research. An article in 1808 profiled unusual meta-anthracite. C.T. Jackson launched the first geologic study of the entire state in 1840 and in 1887 the Providence Franklin Society published a "Report on the Geology of Rhode Island." A geologist at Brown University conducted his own surveys beginning in 1909 and the state was included in a combined geologic map with Massachusetts in 1917.

The US Geological Survey and independent geological researchers began the formal process of mapping Rhode Island's bedrock geology, carrying out quadrangle mapping between 1944 and 1971. Until 1985, Rhode Island did not have a designated state geologist. Alonzo Quinn (1940-1977) served unofficially as state geologist until his death. J. Allan Cain was appointed the State Geologist in 1985 and served until 1996 when he was replaced by Jon C. Boothroyd, who created the Rhode Island State Geological Survey. The State Geological Survey conducts research on hydrogeology, coastal geology, glacial geology, bedrock geology, environmental geology and economic geology and carries out public outreach.

William R. Wright, while serving as an Associate Professor of Soil Science at the University of Rhode Island and Edward H. Sautter, the State Soil Scientist completed a survey of soils across the state for the University of Rhode Island Agricultural Experiment Station in 1988.

== Mining in Rhode Island ==
Although mining has never been central to the economy of Rhode Island, the state is notable for granite and coal mining as well as historical periods of gold mining and modern day extraction of aggregates for road and building construction.

Westerly granite, found between Westerly and Bradford is a pink to gray fine-grained granite composed of glassy quartz, black mica and feldspar. The mineral composition of Westerly granite makes it easy to polish. First recognized in 1846 by Orlando Smith, Westerly granite was extensively quarried between 1845 and 1955 and has been used in many of the statues at Gettysburg, Travelers Tower in Hartford, Brown University, Central Park and other locations.

Elsewhere, in the western interior of the state, granite gneiss was historically quarried for curbing and to build the foundations of houses. In the agrarian history of early settlement in Rhode Island, quartzite was extracted from Glocester and Foster to sharpen scythes for harvesting.

In the early 19th century, efforts were briefly made to use cyanide to extract gold from rocks at Snake Den Quarry in Johnston, although no economically significant amounts were discovered. Around the same time, in 1809 the General Assembly announced a $10,000 lottery to develop a coal mine in the Narragansett Basin in Portsmouth. One million tons of coal were ultimately extracted from the mine. In Little Compton and Tiverton, the coal seam had turned to graphite, leading to a small scale effort to mine graphite. Mid-size coal mines also operated in Cranston and Pawtucket through the 1930s.

Heat and pressure made the anthracite coal in Rhode Island graphite rich and difficult to burn.
