= Geology of Ohio =

The geology of Ohio formed beginning more than one billion years ago in the Proterozoic eon of the Precambrian. The igneous and metamorphic crystalline basement rock is poorly understood except through deep boreholes and does not outcrop at the surface. The basement rock is divided between the Grenville Province and Superior Province. When the Grenville Province crust collided with Proto-North America, it launched the Grenville orogeny, a major mountain building event. The Grenville mountains eroded, filling in rift basins and Ohio was flooded and periodically exposed as dry land throughout the Paleozoic. In addition to marine carbonates such as limestone and dolomite, large deposits of shale and sandstone formed as subsequent mountain building events such as the Taconic orogeny and Acadian orogeny led to additional sediment deposition. Ohio transitioned to dryland conditions in the Pennsylvanian, forming large coal swamps and the region has been dryland ever since. Until the Pleistocene glaciations erased these features, the landscape was cut with deep stream valleys, which scoured away hundreds of meters of rock leaving little trace of geologic history in the Mesozoic and Cenozoic.

== Stratigraphy, tectonics and geologic history ==
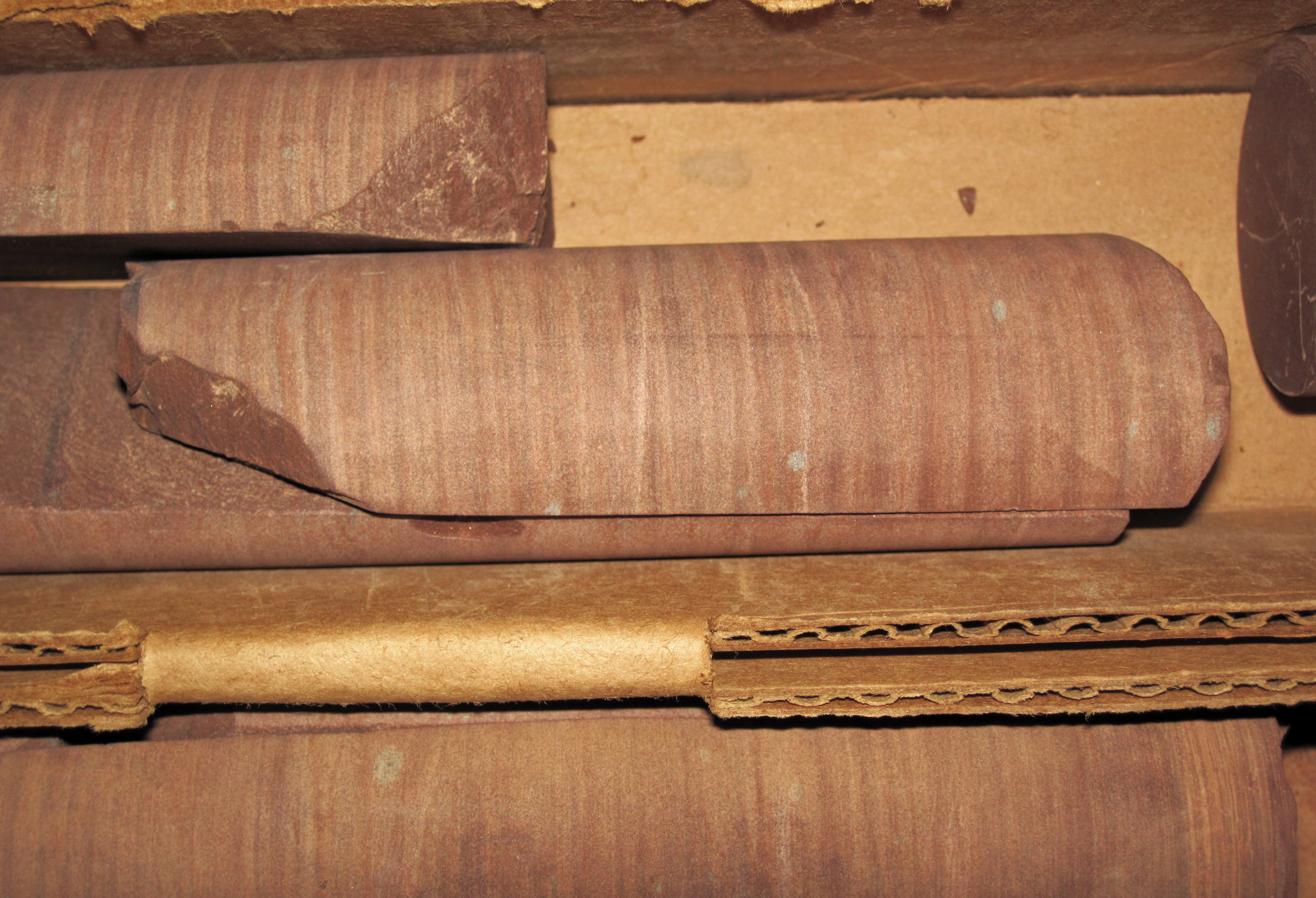
Proterozoic sandstone drill core taken in Warren County, Ohio.

The oldest igneous and metamorphic rocks in Ohio date to the Precambrian. They remain poorly understood, except for a few deep boreholes. Central and eastern Ohio is underlain by the metamorphic rocks belonging to the Grenville Province—an ancient plate that collided with the Superior Province of Proto-North America in the Proterozoic eon, beginning slightly more than one billion years ago.

In Ohio, the Grenville Province and Superior Province are separated by the Grenville Front, which underlies the Cincinnati Arch and Findlay Arch. West of the Grenville Front is a series of rifts, similar to the modern rifts in East Africa that form the Red Sea. The rifts in western Ohio form part of the East Continent Rift Zone, which is covered in six kilometers of undeformed sandstones and other silicate sedimentary rocks.

The collision of the Grenville Province with Proto-North America resulted in the long-lasting Grenville orogeny, producing a tall mountain range. However, the mountain range eroded to an undulating plain, bounded by rift valleys in the west, by the start of the Paleozoic.

=== Paleozoic (539-251 million years ago) ===
The Cambrian at the start of the Paleozoic marked the proliferation of multi-cellular life. By the Late Cambrian, Ohio was covered in shallow seas, creating marine and delta deposits. Sandstone, mudstone, shale, limestone and dolomite deposited atop the faulted Precambrian basement rocks. Periodic retreats of sea level during the Paleozoic eroded these rock units, leading to some unconformities in the sedimentary sequence, through the Early Permian. During some of these periods of sea level retreat, beginning in the Ordovician, the region experienced terrestrial erosion in the Pennsylvanian and Permian. The drop in sea levels was related to the uplift of the region during the Taconic orogeny to the east.

In the Middle Ordovician, a renewed marine transgression flooded the region, depositing limestone reefs. These rocks are only known from underground drilling and do not outcrop at the surface.

The Point Pleasant Formation is the oldest rock unit exposed at the surface in Ohio and formed during the Late Ordovician, outcropping along the Ohio River near Cincinnati. The formation records a transition from shallow-water limestone reef formation to a deeper water environment, marked by overlying shale and limestone, which form the Cincinnatian Series. Clay shed from the rising mountains, associated with the Taconic orogeny formed the shale units. The warm sea water created perfect conditions for abundant biological activity and the Cincinnatian Series is highly fossil-bearing, outcropping across much of southwest Ohio in river beds, hillsides and road cuts. Ohio's State Invertebrate Fossil, is a trilobite found in the formation.

The Southern Hemisphere where Ohio was located at the end of the Ordovician experienced a widespread glaciation, around 438 million years ago. Sea level dropped due to the glaciation, accompanied by a subsidence of the land. Ordovician deposition ended, marked by a paraconformable break in the Drakes Formation.

By the beginning of the Silurian, sea levels advanced again. The shallow sea in the Silurian led to the formation of subtropical carbonates, which now outcrop to the east and west of the Cincinnati Arch and at the crest of the Findlay Arch. Some of the carbonates were deposited in reefs, such as the Early Silurian Lockport Dolomite. Although they do contain some fossils, most of the Silurian rock units poorly preserve evidence of life. The units are separated by layers of evaporite, including anhydrite, gypsum and halite. Thick salt beds formed in connection with drops in sea level and land subsidence, generating the thick salt beds of the Salina Group in eastern Ohio.

A new plate collision launched the Acadian orogeny in the Devonian and led to sediment deposition in the Appalachian Basin of eastern Ohio. The Early Devonian Helderberg Limestone and Oriskany Sandstone, which formed 408 million years ago, are known in the subsurface. Some Early Devonian rocks, of the Holland Quarry Shale, were briefly exposed at the quarry in Lucas County, before it was filled in and reclaimed. Most Devonian rocks date to the Middle Devonian and outcrop between southern Ohio and Lake Erie. A large unconformity separates Silurian and Middle Devonian dolomite and limestone. The overlying Devonian rocks include the Columbus Limestone to the east of the Findlay Arch and the Detroit River Group carbonates to the west. The angular unconformity between lower Silurian rocks is marked in some places by phosphate beds, that preserve bones and teeth.

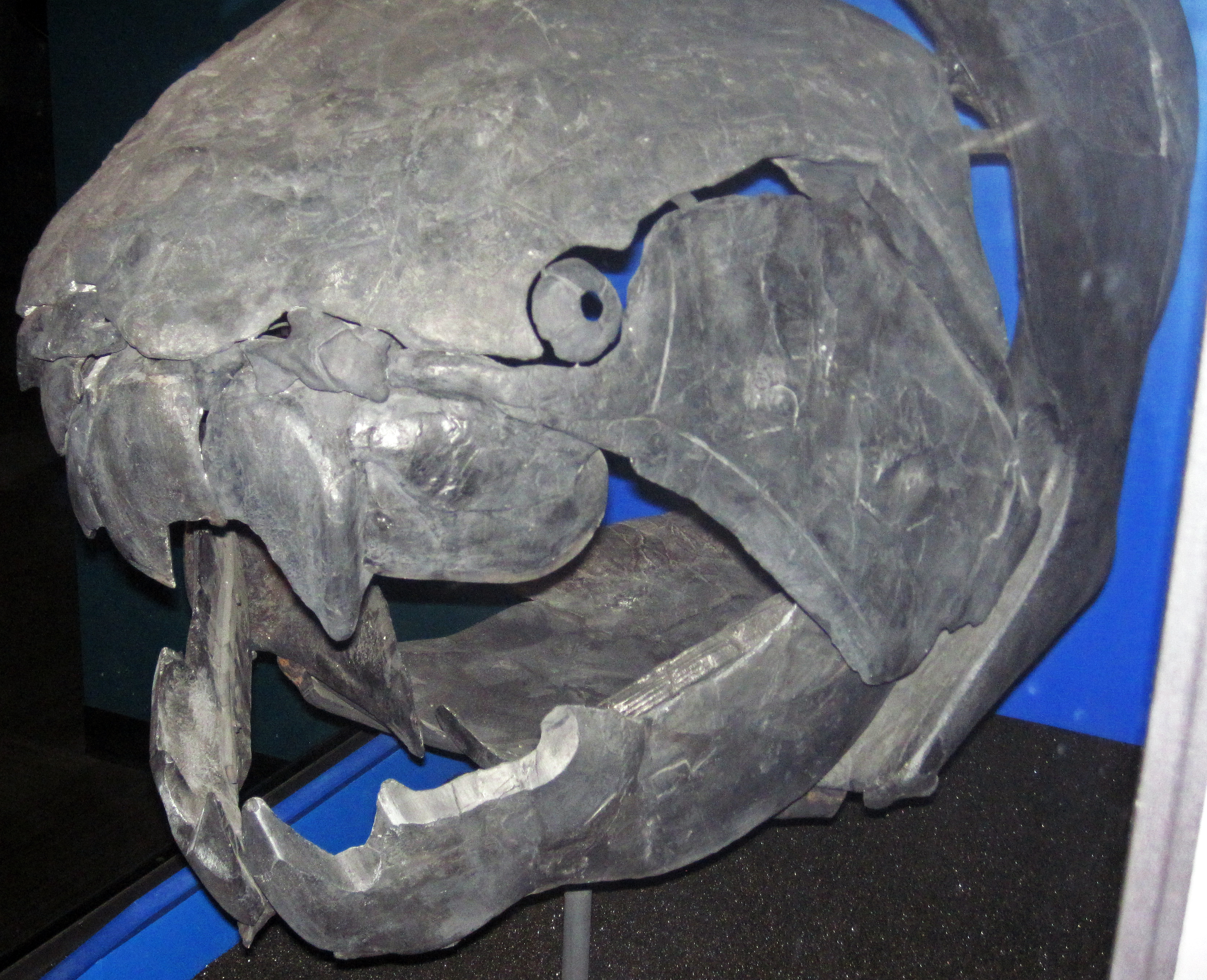
A cast of a Dunkleosteus fossil found near Cleveland, Ohio

The Columbus Limestone is especially fossil bearing and outcrops in a band between Columbus and Sandusky County, as well as on Kelleys Island in Lake Erie. The best fossil exposures are found at limestone quarries along the belt, which supply local concrete demand. Toward the end of the Middle Devonian, the marine environment shifted toward black marine shale deposition, of the Olentangy Shale and Ohio Shale. For the most part, these shale units are not fossiliferous. However, in some places, there are occurrences of brachiopod, arthropod, arthrodire and shark fossils, as well as Dunkleosteus armor plates.

At the start of the Mississippian, in the Carboniferous, 340 million years ago, river and delta sediments covered over the shales, producing the Bedford Shale, Berea Sandstone, Cuyahoga Formation and Logan Formation. The deposition of these units was briefly interrupted by a return to a stagnant marine environment, forming the Sunbury Shale. Outcrops of Mississippian rocks run parallel to Devonian rocks across central Ohio and paralleling the Lake Erie shore. In fact, Mississippian outcrops form a band of hills five to 10 miles south of the lake. In general the Mississippian rocks are moderately fossiliferous, with good crinoid preservation in Cuyahoga Formation. Pennsylvanian rocks deposited in stream channels carved into older Mississippian rocks.

The Middle Pennsylvanian Sharon sandstone and Pottsville Group preserve evidence of uplift in the east, and subsidence in the west of the Appalachian Basin. The rocks that formed in the Pennsylvanian and Permian were mainly terrestrial in origin, including non-marine shale, sandstone, coal, ironstone and limestone, along with some marine rocks, such as flint and marine shale. River deltas in the Pennsylvanian, were covered in thick, swampy vegetation, helping to produce coal deposits.

Sedimentary rocks and fossil evidence suggests that Ohio has been a terrestrial environment since the Permian. For instance, the main subdivisions of the Pennsylvanian: the Pottsville Group, Alleghany Group, Conemaugh Group and Monongahela Group, along with the Early Permian Dunkard Group, are each more terrestrial than the last. The region was situated inland, experiencing terrestrial erosion as the Proto-North American continent of Laurasia collided with Gondwana to form the supercontinent Pangaea. Rocks from the end of Paleozoic are best exposed in road cuts along I-77, between Canton and Marietta, I-77 from Cambridge to Bridgeport and cliffs on the Ohio River north of Marietta to East Liverpool.

=== Mesozoic-Cenozoic (251 million years ago-present) ===
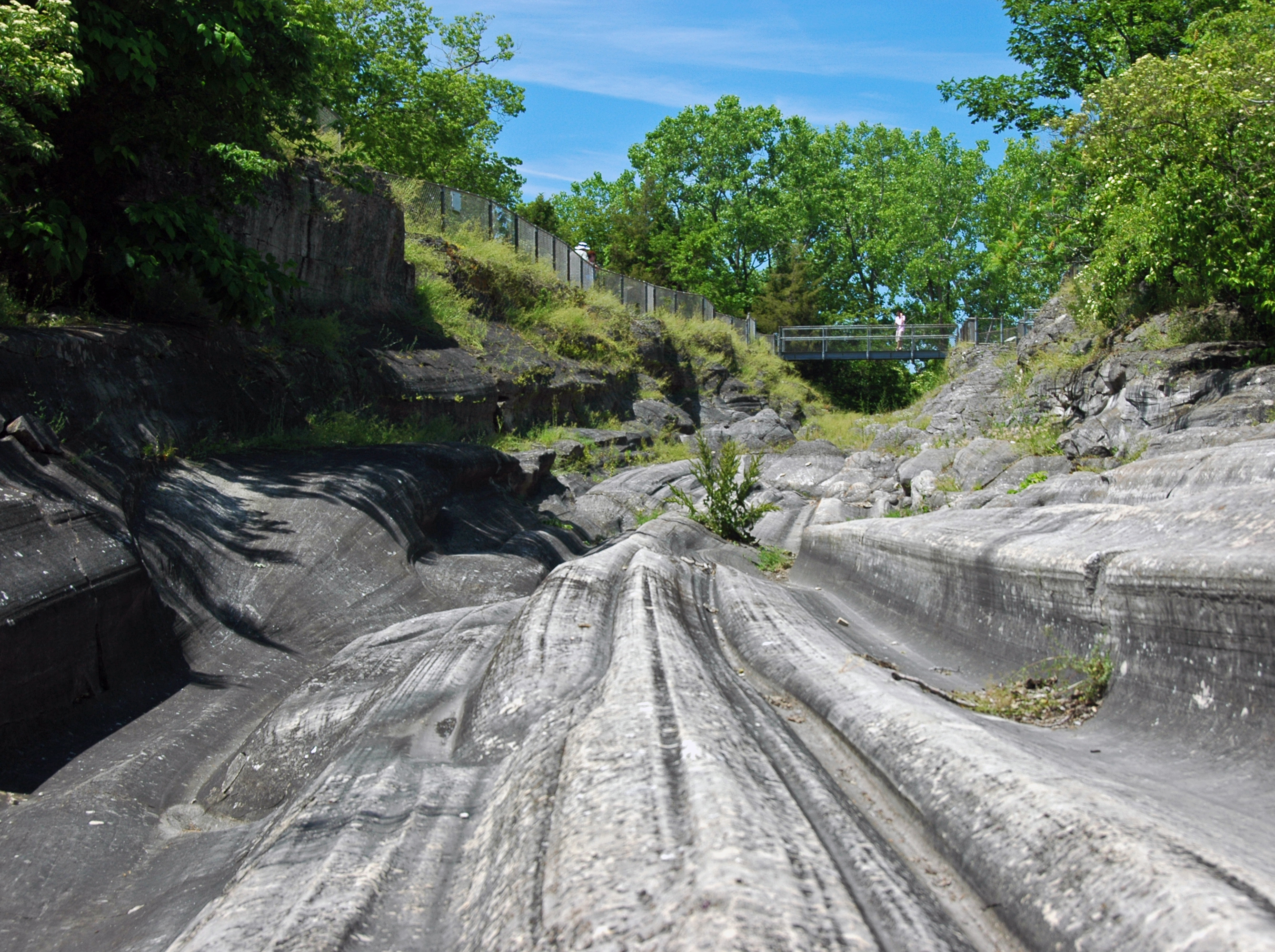
Glacial grooves on Kelleys Island.

For 245 million years, spanning the entirety of the Mesozoic in the Paleogene, of the early Cenozoic, Ohio experienced long-running uplift and weathering. Prior to the Pleistocene glaciations, the region was covered in large stream valleys, which are believed to have removed several hundred meters of rock, erasing most evidence of the Mesozoic and Cenozoic. Some bones and plant fossils, including mastodon remains, have been found in recent sediments formed since the Pleistocene.

== Natural resource geology ==
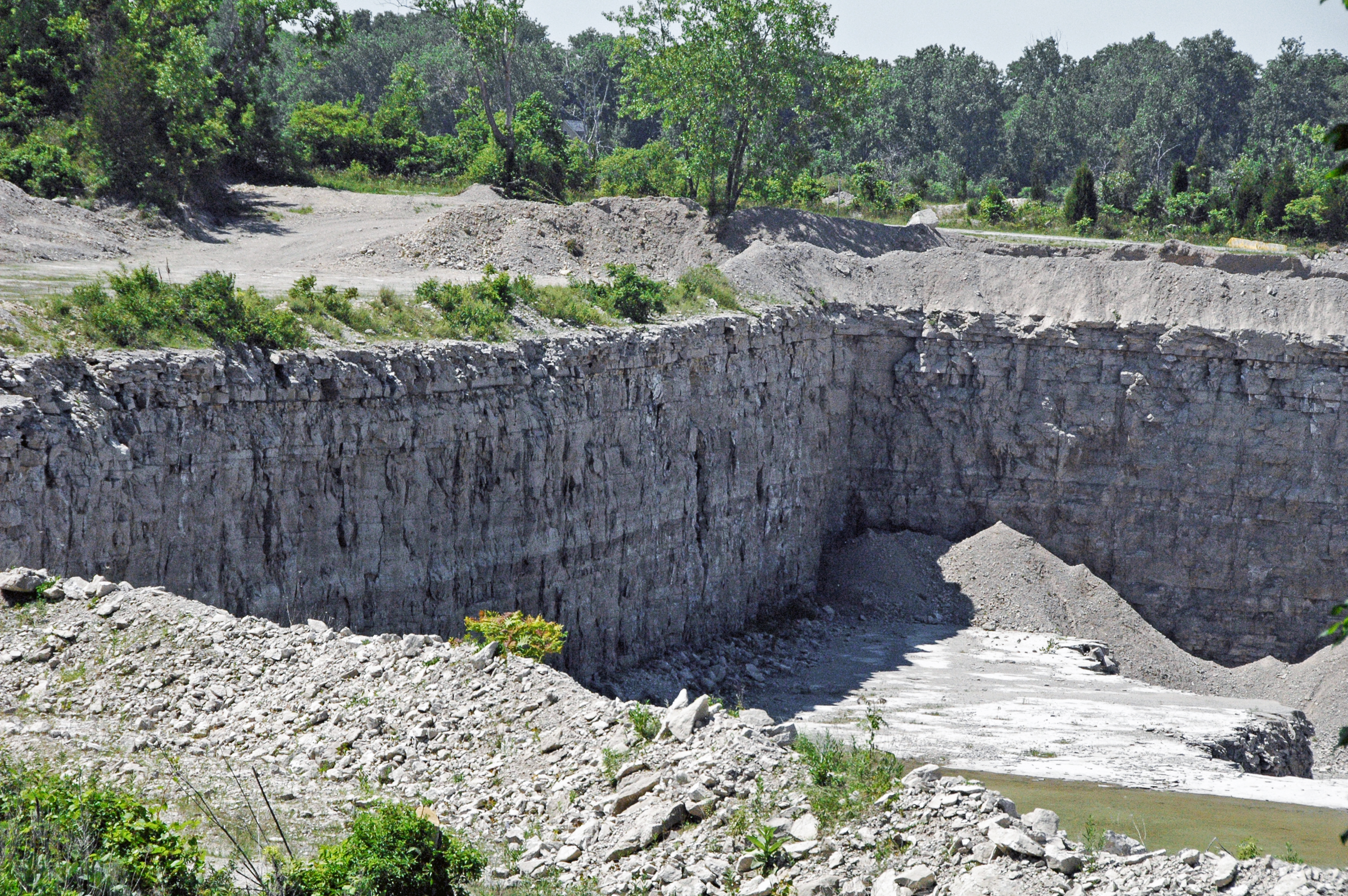
A limestone quarry on Kelley's Island, Ohio.

Ohio has varied natural resources. In 2016, 64.92 million tons of limestone and dolomite valued at $615 million was quarried, along with 12.23 million tons of coal, worth $541 million. Sand and gravel, salt, sandstone and conglomerate all have production over one million tons. Shale and clay are also quarried. Ohio produces three billion dollars' worth of natural gas and $844 million of oil annually. Coal deposits were first recognized in the 1740s by early settlers and were mapped as early as 1752. Decreased demand due to increased natural gas production has reduced coal mining in the 2010s, although one underground mine and three surface mines received expansion permits from the state in 2016. Mining and quarrying currently employs 3,546 people in the state.

The Salina Group is mined 500 meters beneath Lake Erie, in Cuyahoga County and Fairport Harbor.

== Geological features ==
- The Auglaize Fault goes from Darke County, Ohio to Hancock County, Ohio.
- The Sheriden Cave, a karst sinkhole in Wyandot County, Ohio.
- The Bowling Green Fault goes from Findlay, Ohio to southern Michigan.
