= Langham Square =

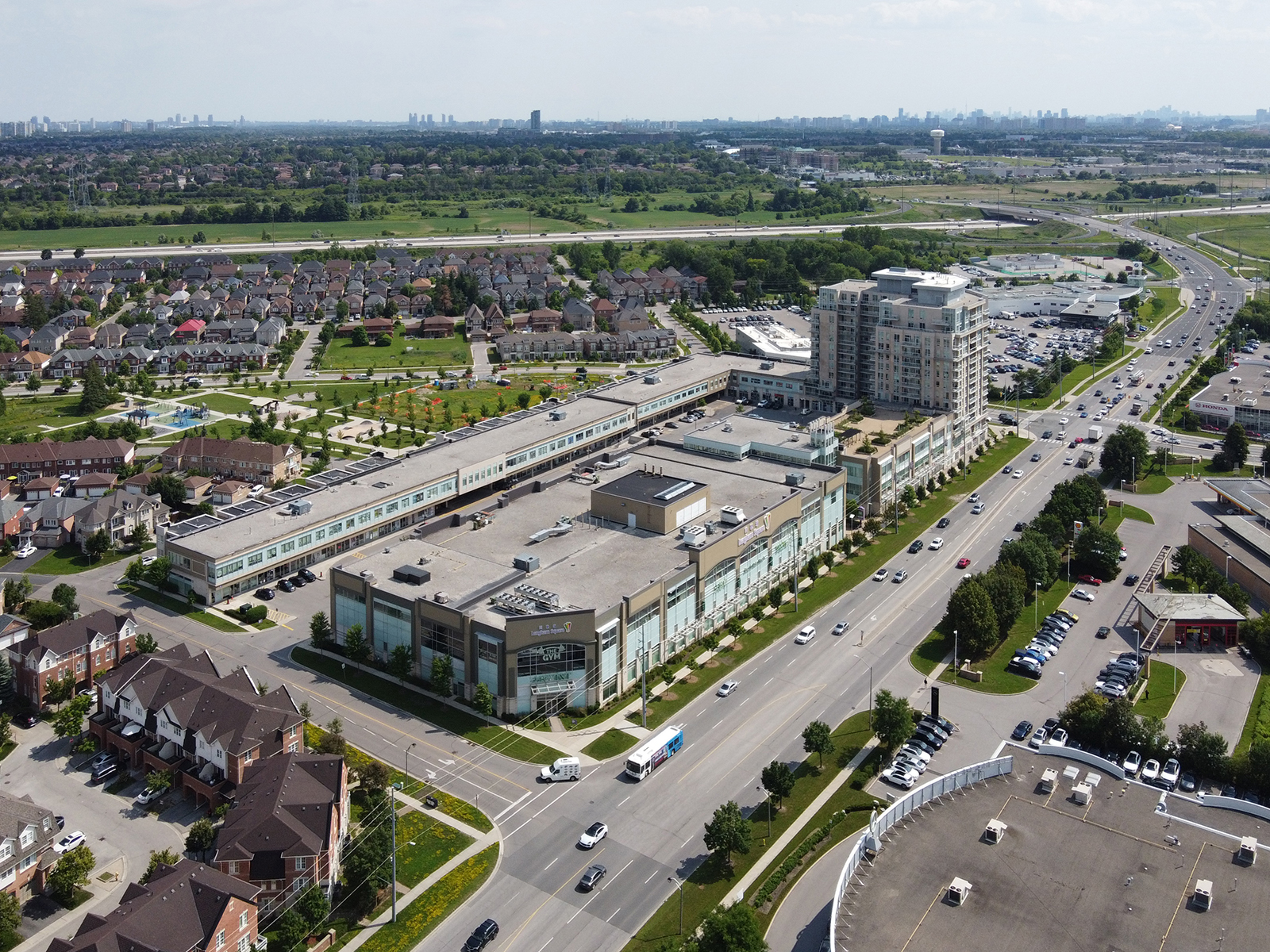
- Aerial view of Langham Square
- Location: Markham, Ontario, Canada
- Coordinates: 43.85722°N 79.30335°W
- Address: 28 South Unionville Ave
- Opened: 2013
- Developer: Mady Development Corporation
- Manager: LANGHAM SQUARE - Property Manager
- Owner: LANGHAM SQUARE - Property Manager
- Architect: Turner Fleischer Architects, Toronto
- Num. of stores: 700
- Num. of anchor tenants: 1
- Floor area: 500,000 square feet (46,000 m^{2})
- Floors: 2 (retail); 12 (residential)
- Parking: 1,356
- Website: www.langhamsquare.ca

Langham Square (Chinese: 朗豪坊) (formerly known as South Unionville Square) is a 500,000-square-foot (46,000 m^{2}) Asian-themed shopping, office and residential complex in Markham, Ontario, Canada. It is located at the intersection of Kennedy Road and South Unionville Avenue, which is north of the 407 ETR and east of Downtown Markham. Its Chinese name "朗豪坊" echoes Langham Place, a shopping and office complex located in Mong Kok, Hong Kong.

It is primarily a mall to serve the growing Asian community. The complex includes a condominium tower and townhouses with commercial retail/professional offices. It is anchored at the concourse level by T & T Supermarket, which belongs to the group of Loblaws Ltd. chain stores (scheduled to relocate to Markville Mall in summer 2028). On the south end of the complex is a 12 floor 253 unit condo tower.

== Description ==
The Mall at Langham Square (Chinese: 朗豪坊二樓商場) is a mixed-use development home to a wide range of prime retail, restaurant, office and medical space.

The Lane at Langham Square (Chinese: 朗豪里) is a shopping retail level of the mall home to a wide variety of shops and services. It is connected to the condominium tower.

The Markham Chinese Cultural Centre of F.C.C.M services is located inside Langham Square.

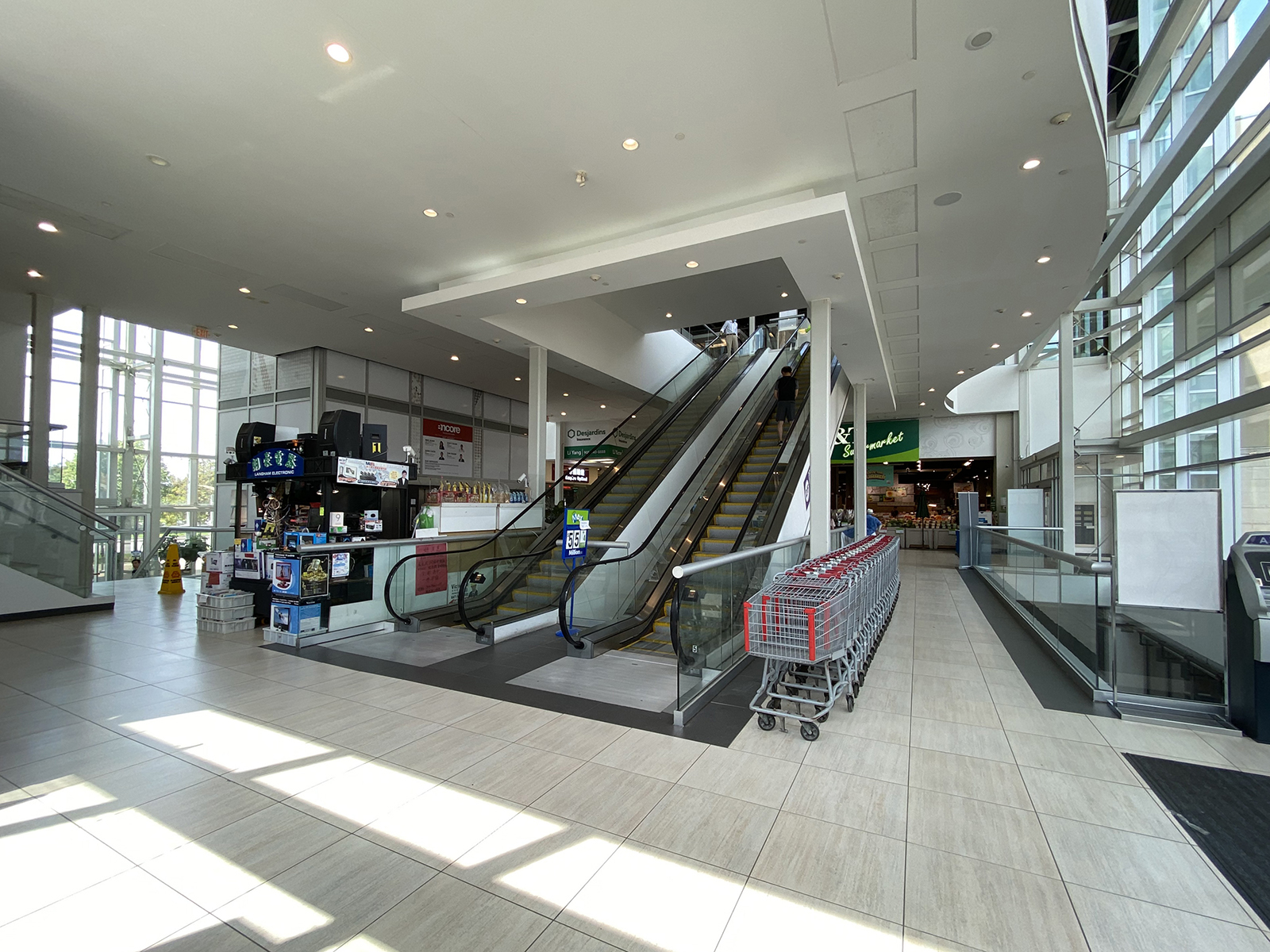
Level 1

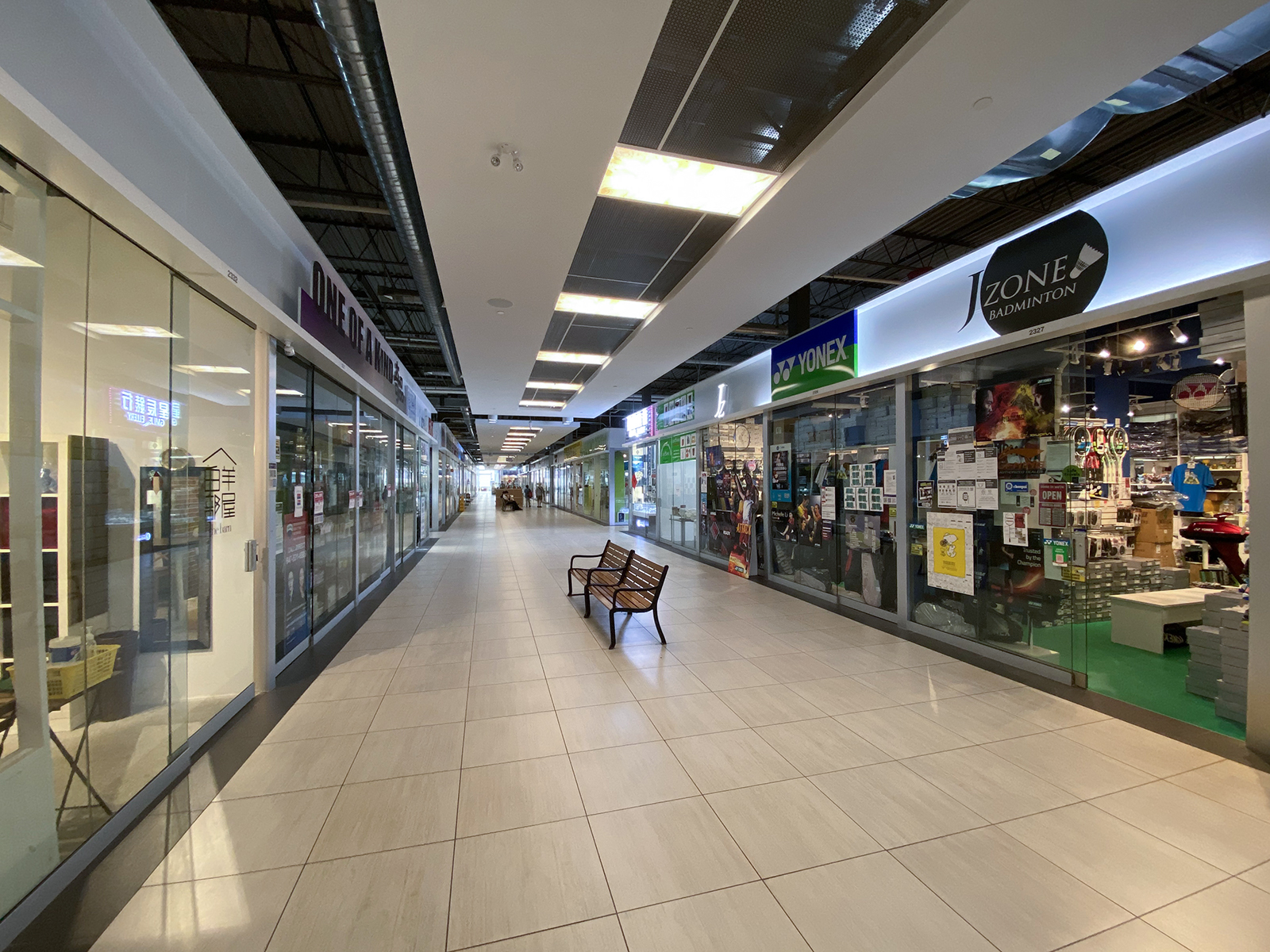
Level 2

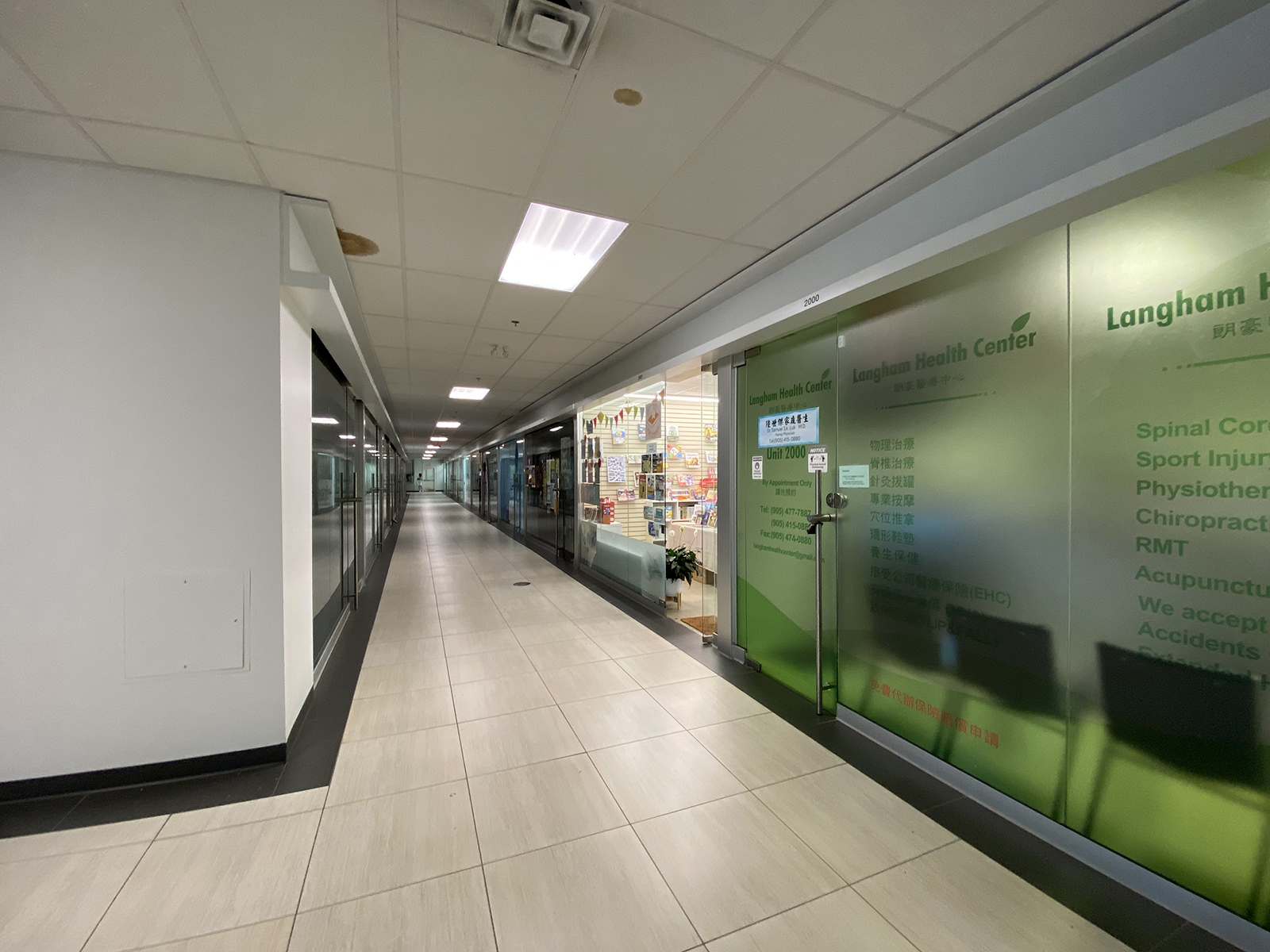
Langham Lane in Level 2

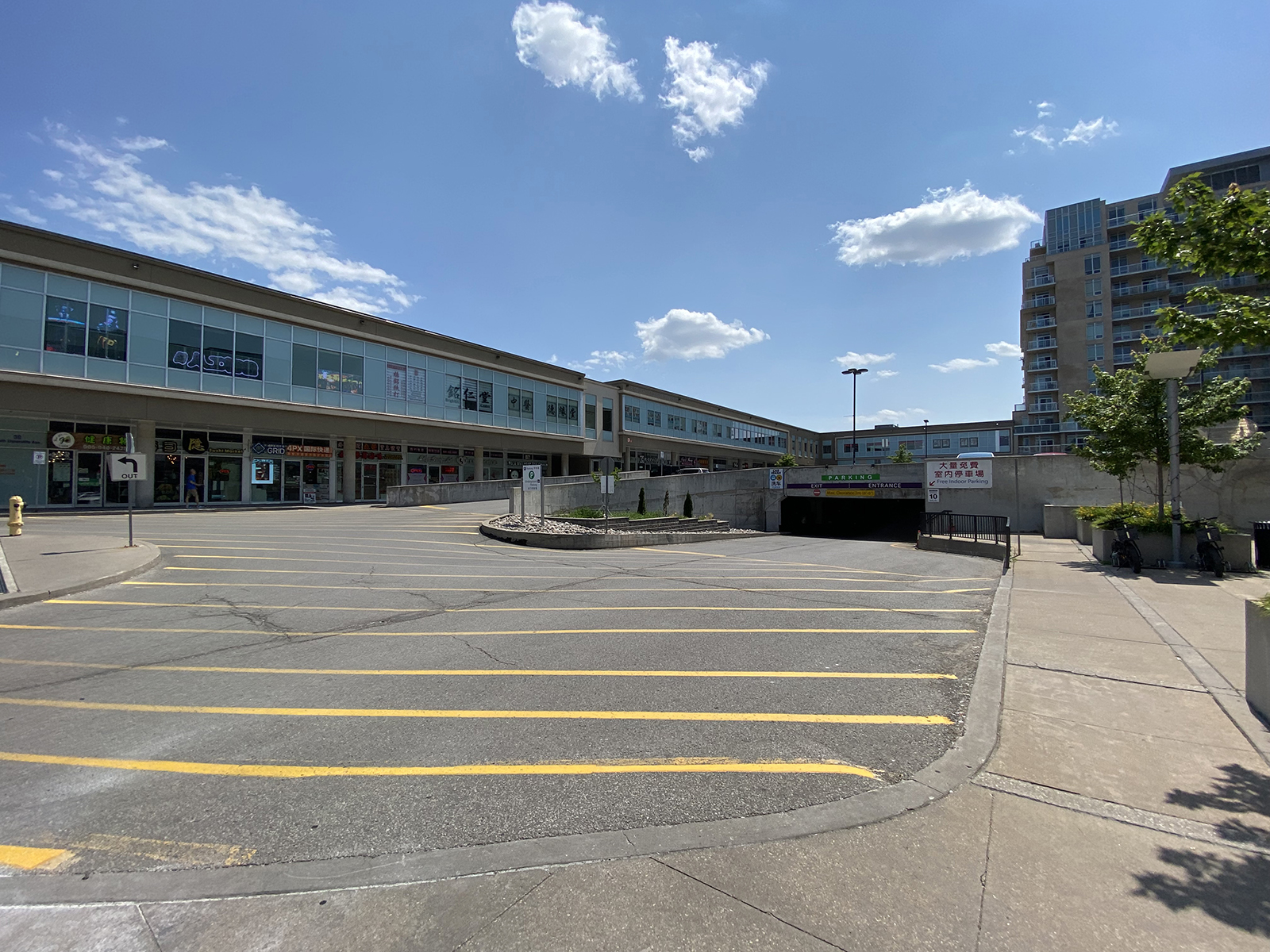
Outdoor Carpark entrance and shops

== Transportation ==
The mall is accessible via the nearby Unionville GO Station, multiple York Region Transit/Viva Rapid Transit bus stops within walking distance, the 407 ETR and its close proximity to Downtown Markham.

There is an underground parking lot and limited above ground parking spaces service patrons to the mall.
