= Locust Hill, Ontario =

Locust Hill
- Unincorporated community and former hamlet
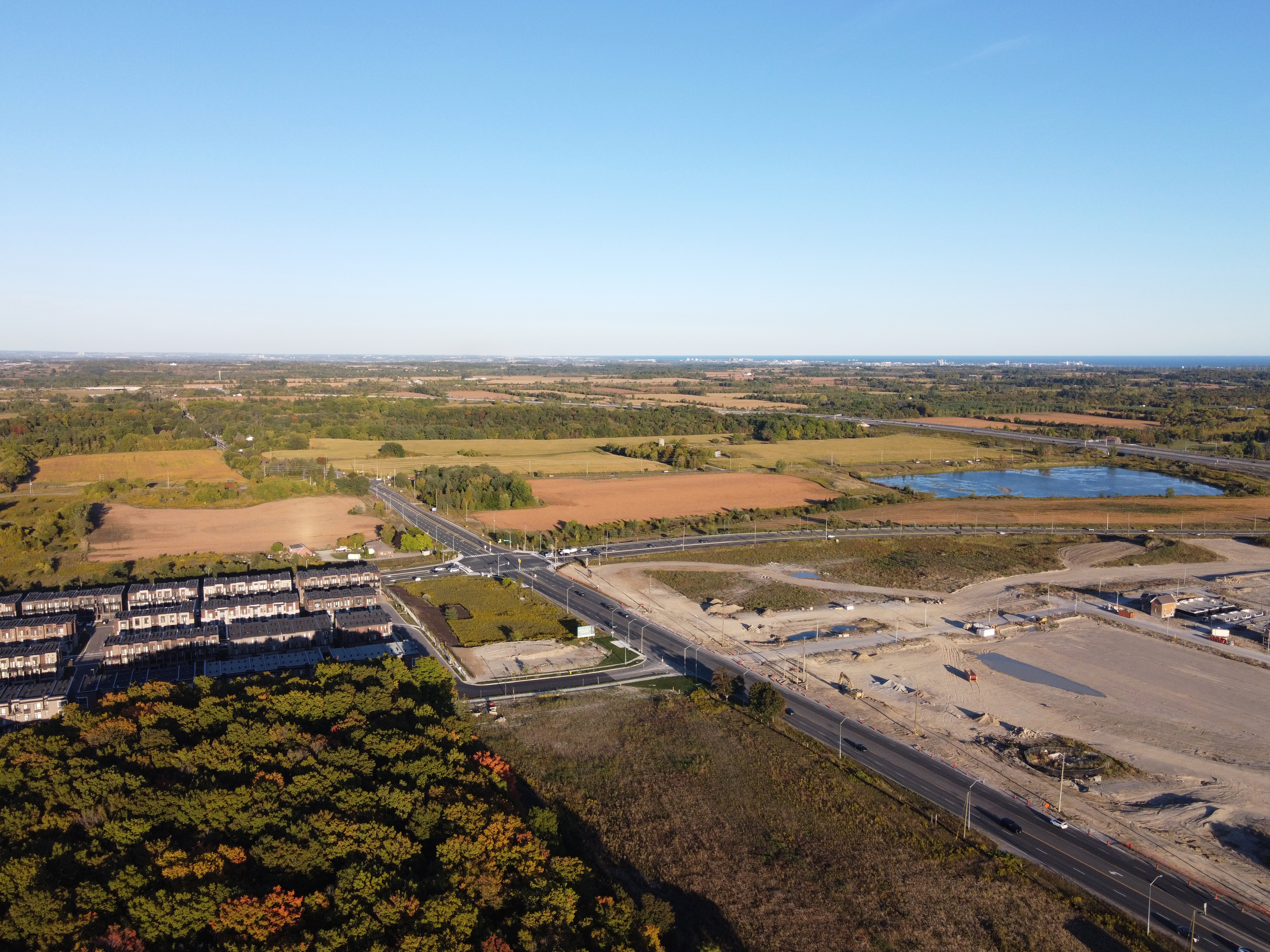
- Aerial view of Locust Hill in 2025
- Interactive map of Locust Hill
- Coordinates: 43°53′16″N 79°11′52″W
- Country: Canada
- Province: Ontario
- Regional municipality: York
- City: Markham
- Established: 1832
- Elevation: 205 m (673 ft)
- Time zone: UTC-5 (EST)
  - Summer (DST): UTC-4 (EDT)
- Area codes: 905 and 289

Locust Hill is a historic community of Markham, Ontario centred on Hwy. 7 and the Canadian Pacific Railway and within the boundaries of the future national Rouge Park.

== History ==
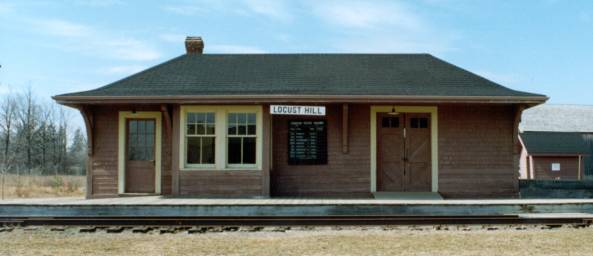
The Locust Hill railway station building is now at the Markham Museum

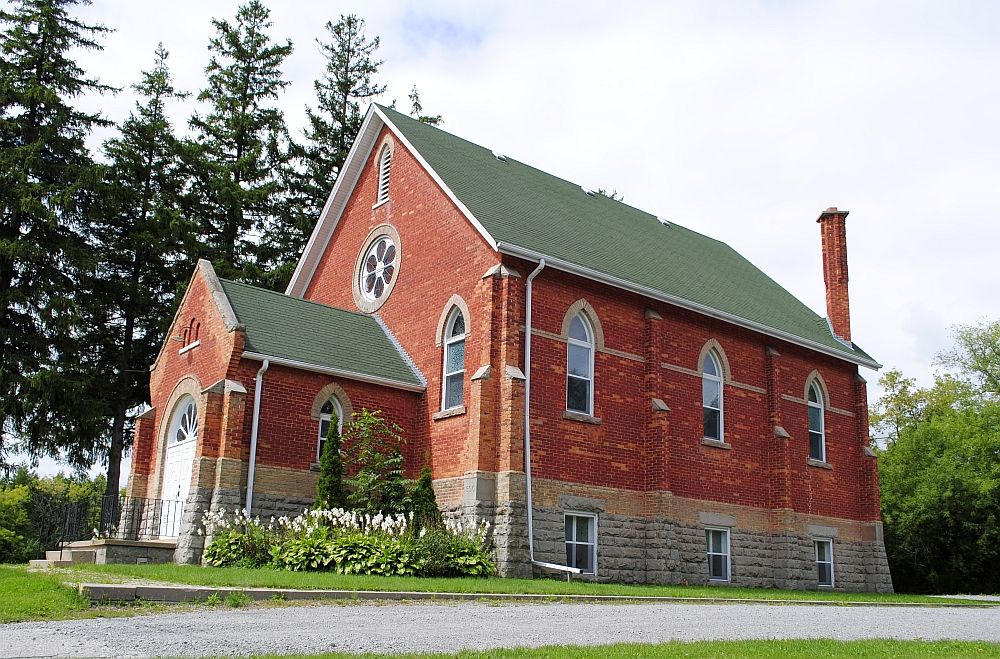
Locust Hill United Church

Locust Hill was first settled about 1799 by Samuel Reynolds, a United Empire Loyalist from Dutchess County, New York. The hamlet, centred on lots 10 and 11, concession 10. Today the area is made up of existing and newer homes along Highway 7.

Locust Hill only became a place of significance with the arrival of the Ontario and Quebec Railway in the 1884, linking Toronto with Peterborough. Area business leaders from Whitevale and Green River petitioned to create a railway station at what is now Locust Hill. Originally called Green River Station and later renamed. The hamlet and station were named after the farm of William and Esther Reesor Armstrong, where locust trees were a prominent feature.

Locust Hill was one of the busiest stations on the Toronto-Perth line and was built on the St Clair Farm owned by Captain William Button on the northwest side of Highway 7. Flour, brushes, livestock and milk were shipped out of Locust Hill in quantity. In 1887 an elevator and mill were built east of the station, a water tower on the west side, and a co-operative creamery was built on the south side of Highway 7 on the east bank of the Rouge River in 1893, which burned down in 1910. The original Van Horne style one and half storey station burned down in 1935 and was replaced by a single floor station in 1936. Rail service through Locust Hill ceased in 1969, but the line is still active. The old Locust Hill Station has been relocated in 1983 and reconstructed at the Markham Museum and Historic Village and the station platform was removed and replaced with a grass strip.

== Retail Sections ==
Locust Hill had a small number of retail businesses along Highway 7:

- Nighswander Brothers General Store and Temperance Hotel was built in 1885 and largest non residential structure. Building housed the local Standard Bank of Canada branch. The site sat vacant after 2004; it was torn down in 2012 after a partial collapse and now a vacant lot despite City of Markham request for owner to rebuild the structure.
- Sandy Duff blacksmith shop.
- Locust Hill Creamery located off Highway 7 on east bank of Little Rouge Creek; it later converted as private residence.

== Churches, post office and school ==
In 1856, a Methodist Church as well

A brick schoolhouse, SS#21, was built in 1864 on east side of Reesor Road north of Highway 7 and remained in use to the 1960s, converted to residential use and now partially repaired to the original configuration by Toronto Region Conservation Authority in 2017.

A post office, now at present day 7842 Highway 7 East, was originally opened in 1886 and remains in use today. Neighbouring community of Belford to the south closed their post office in 1889 and services moved to Locust Hill.

The present church structure, Locust Hill United Church, was built in 1890 (replacing earlier church on south side of Highway 7) is shared site with Eastside Baptist Church. A cemetery is located across Highway 7 from the church and a cairn was added in the cemetery in 1990.

== Future: Rouge National Park ==
While much of the city of Markham has become residential, the land immediately around Locust Hill is still in agricultural use. In 2011 the Canadian federal government announced plans to create a national Rouge Park. The park will completely encompass the community of Locust Hill.

== Transportation ==
The main roads linking Locust Hill is Highway 7 and Highway 407. The former was the main road into the hamlet. Reesor Road was used to reach the old school house.

=== Locust Hill Line ===
Metrolinx has a planned spur line off from the purposed Midtown corridor terminating a Locust Hill.

== In film ==
- The 1974 film, Vengeance is Mine, starring Ernest Borgnine was filmed partially at the Locust Hill train station (which now sits on the Markham Museum grounds).
- The 1976 film, Silver Streak, starring Richard Pryor includes a train scene in the hamlet where the general store can be seen.
