= Wismer =

Wismer is a toponymic surname derived from the German town of Wismar. In English, the name of the city is pronounced "w'iz mer".

An alternative derivation for some people with the surname is drift from the name Wiseman (Ƿyseman, Ƿysman, Ƿisman), which derived from the Old English words "ƿis", meaning "wise" or "knowledgeable", and "man", meaning "man". The Wiseman family in England is first found in Essex where they were anciently seated. Some of the first settlers of this name or some of its variants were: Henry and Catherine Wiseman, who settled in Maryland in 1634; John Wiseman, who settled in Virginia in 1652; and Henry Wiseman, who settled in Maryland in 1719.

== People ==
- Donald Wismer, American science fiction novelist
- Gordon Sylvester Wismer (1888–1968), Canadian lawyer and political figure
- Harry Wismer (1913–1967), American broadcaster
- Leslie Wismer (1909–1978), Canadian trade union official
- Susan Wismer (born 1955), American politician

== See also ==
- Wisner
- Wisman
- Wismann
- Wismer Commons, a neighborhood in Markham, Ontario
