= List of historic buildings in Markham, Ontario =

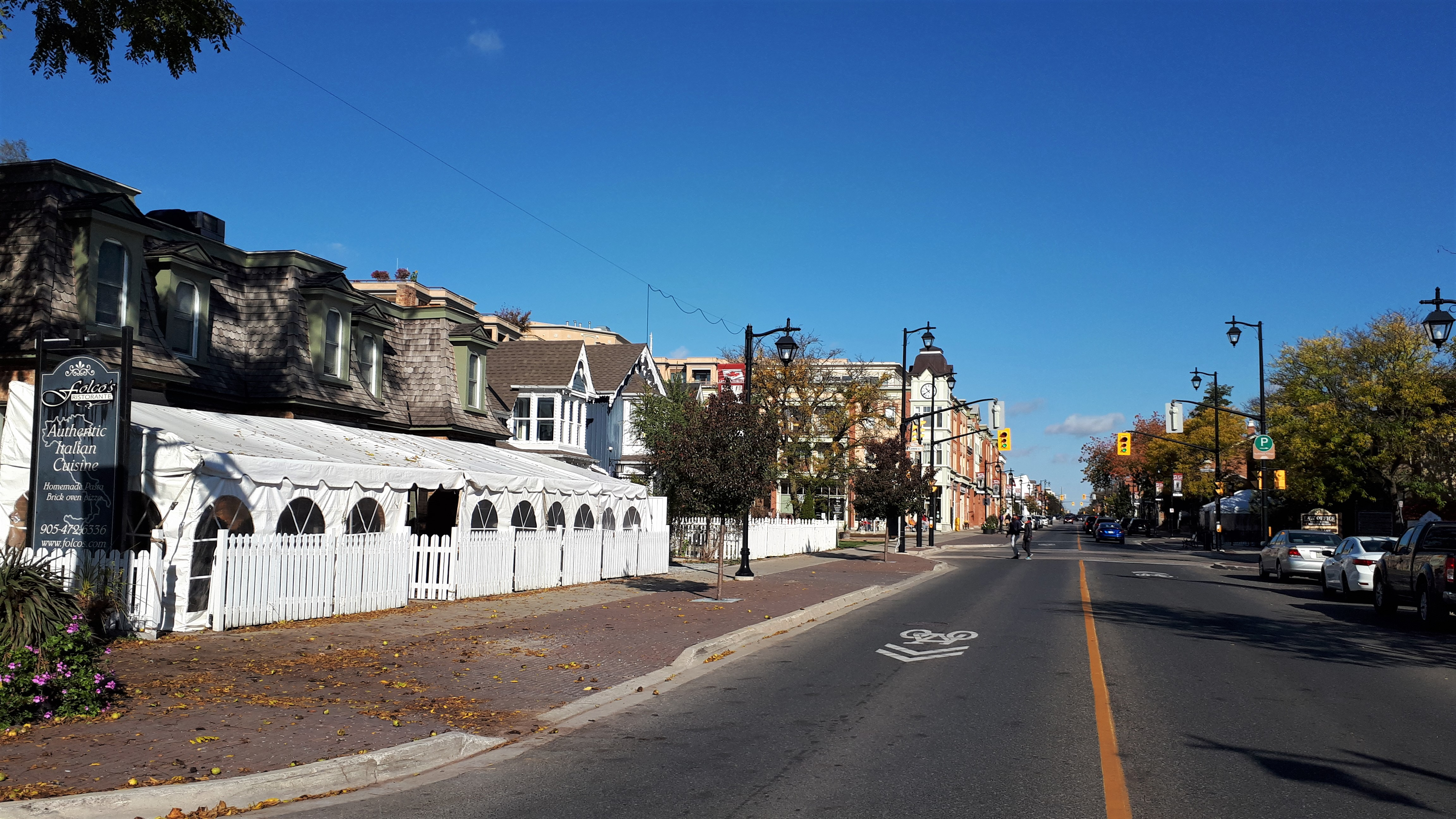
Several historic buildings along Main Street Markham in the Markham Village Heritage District, one of four heritage conservation districts in Markham.

Historic buildings in Markham, Ontario, reflect the area's long history of human activity, beginning with Indigenous communities such as the Huron-Wendat, Petun, Neutral, and Iroquois. Europeans began to build structures in Markham with the settlement of Thornhill and Unionville in 1794, and the establishment of Buttonville and Markham Village shortly afterwards during the early 19th century.

The oldest surviving building in the municipality dates back to 1800. Most of Markham's surviving historic buildings built before 1851 are residences still used for that purpose, though a small number of commercial and institutional buildings also remain.

== Existing historic buildings ==
Most historic structures and properties are presently registered with the Markham Register of Property of Cultural Heritage Value or Interest. A number of buildings and properties listed on the registry are protected under the Ontario Heritage Act. Buildings and structures in the registry are either listed as individual properties, or as a part of a larger heritage conservation district. The oldest structure listed on the registry is Philip Eckardt Log House, built in 1800.

The majority of Markham's oldest standing structures were built as private residences, many of which are still used for that purpose. However, some residences have been re-purposed for commercial use.

=== Locations ===
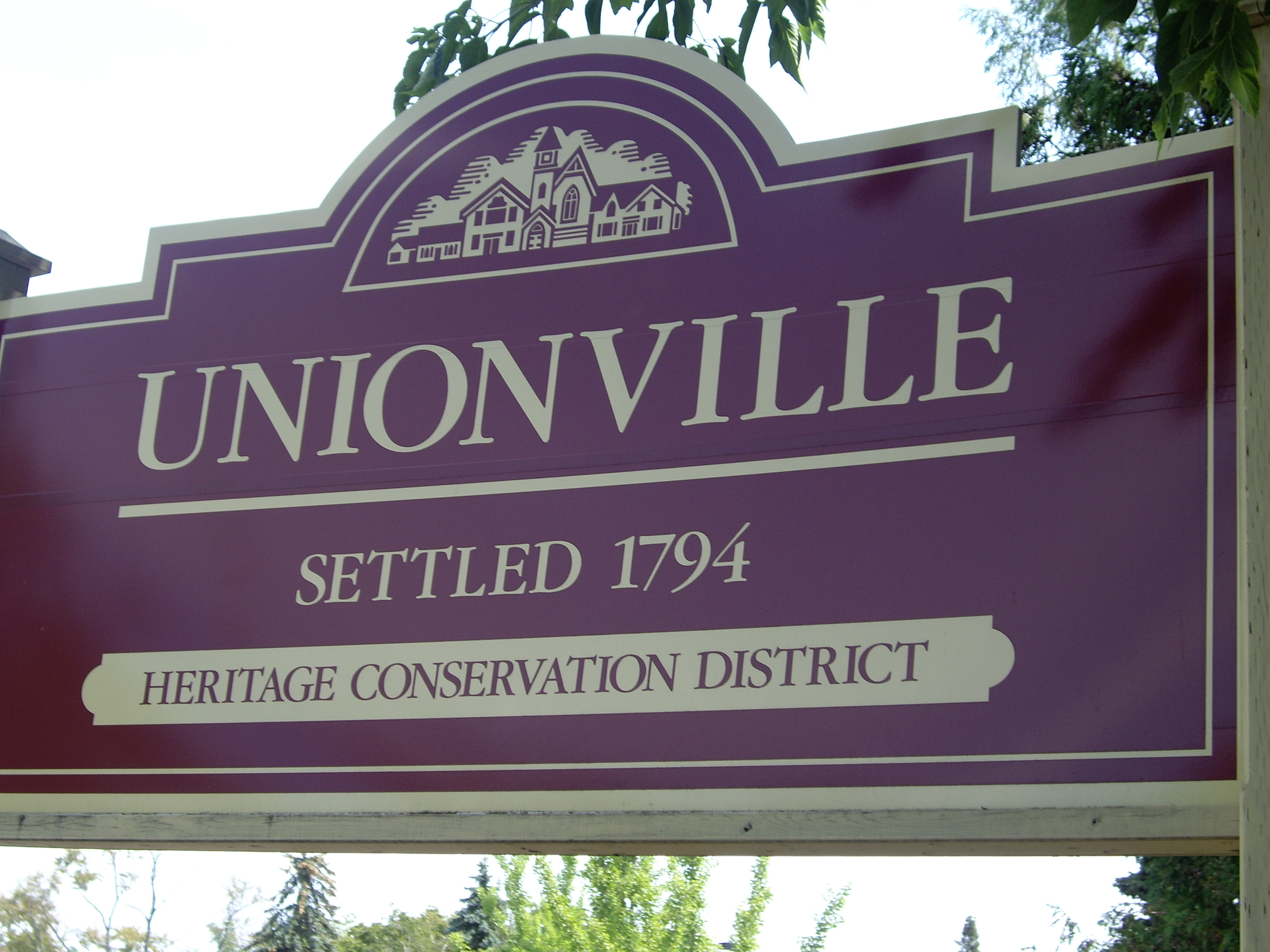
Signage for the Unionville Heritage Conservation District

Historic buildings and structures are spread throughout Markham, although several historic buildings are clustered in four "heritage conservation districts," Buttonville, Markham Village, Thornhill, and Unionville. Developments in the heritage conservation districts is required to follow municipal guidelines laid out in the heritage district's conservation plan. These conservation plans were created to protect historic buildings, and to ensure that new developments within these districts complement the "character of the neighbourhood".

In addition to the heritage conservation districts, other clusters of heritage buildings are also situated at the Markham Museum and Markham Heritage Estates. The former is an open-air local history museum; while the latter serves as the city's "subdivision last resort", an area reserved for relocated heritage buildings that cannot be retained on their existing site. The museum and subdivision are both situated near the Markham Village heritage conservation district, although they do not form a part of said district.

=== List of historic buildings (pre-1851) ===
The following is a list of the oldest buildings in Markham that are still erect, up to 1850, as listed by the Markham Register of Property of Cultural Heritage Value or Interest:

| Building | Image | Year completed | Architectural style | Listed address (Note: The listed address is the building's existing address as listed on the Markham Register of Property of Cultural Heritage Value or Interest. Several properties were assigned different addresses during their history, although the address was later changed, or the building was relocated.) | Heritage district | Ward | Ref. |
|---|---|---|---|---|---|---|---|
| Philip Eckardt Log House | | 1800 | N/A - Basic Log cabin | 128 Harbord Street (Note: The original addresses listed for Philip Eckardt Log House was 9451 Kennedy Road, and later 60 Aksel Rinck Drive.) | —N/a | 6 | |
| Christian Reesor Homestead | | 1806 | Georgian | 9035 Reesor Road | —N/a | 5 | |
| 20 Ruggles Avenue | | 1809 | Georgian | 20 Ruggles Avenue | —N/a | 1 | |
| Heintzman House | | 1816 | Regency | 135 Bay Thorn Drive | —N/a | 1 | |
| David Whaley House | | 1820 | Vernacular | 7218 Reesor Road | —N/a | 7 | |
| Joshua Miller House | | 1820 | Georgian | 10 Heritage Corners Lane (Note: The original address listed for Joshua Miller House was 10192 Reesor Road. The building was relocated to 10 Heritage Corners Lane in 2006.) | —N/a | 4 | |
| Christian K. Hoover House | | 1824 | N/A - Basic Log cabin | 9350 Markham Road (Note: The following is the address for the Markham Museum. The individual buildings at the Markham Museum do not have an address. The Christian K. Hoover House was originally located on McCowan Road and Stouffville Road, in the neighbouring community of Stouffville. The building was relocated to the museum in 1975.) | —N/a | 4 | |
| 4130 19th Avenue | | 1826–1850 | Regency | 4130 19th Avenue | —N/a | 6 | |
| Gapper-Duncan House | | 1828 | Georgian & Regency | 6 Wismer Place (Note: The original address listed for Gapper-Duncan House was on Yonge Street. In the late-1950s, the building was relocated to Duncan Street before its relocation to 6 Wismer Place.) | —N/a | 4 | |
| Johnston-Barker House | | 1828 | Georgian & Vernacular | 53 Main Street Markham South | Markham Village | 4 | |
| Byer Family Home | | 1829 | Georgian | 10235 Highway 48 | —N/a | 5 | |
| Eckardt-Stiver House | | 1829 | Ontario Cottage & Regency | 206 Main Street Unionville | Unionville | 3 | |
| Thomas and Sarah Hasty House | | 1829 | Neoclassical | 11482 McCowan Road | —N/a | 6 | |
| Peter Reesor Homestead | | 1830 | Georgian | 7273 14th Avenue | —N/a | 7 | |
| Nathan Chapman Jr. House | | 1832 | Ontario Cottage & Regency | 9350 Markham Road (Note: The following is the address for the Markham Museum. The individual buildings at the Markham Museum do not have an address. The Nathan Chapman Jr. House was originally located on Kennedy Road and Steeles Avenue, in the neighbouring community of Scarborough. The building was relocated to the museum in 1978.) | —N/a | 4 | |
| Cashel Road House | | 1835 | Georgian | 4510 Elgin Mills Road East (Note: The original address listed for Cashel Road House was on Kennedy Avenue. The building's address was later changed to 4510 Elgin Mills Road East.) | —N/a | 6 | |
| John Wurtz House | | 1835 | Regency | 8847 Reesor Road | —N/a | 5 | |
| Joseph & Sarah Henderson House | | 1835 | Georgian | 53 Main Street Markham North | Markham Village | 4 | |
| Unionville Wheelwright and Blacksmith Snop | | 1835 | | 166 Main Street Unionville | Unionville | 3 | |
| George Miller House | | 1839 | Neoclassical | 9318 Reesor Road | —N/a | 5 | |
| Thomas McMackon House | | 1840 | Gothic Revival & Vernacular | 8328 14th Avenue | —N/a | 7 | |
| David Badgerow House | | 1840 | Georgian | 8331 14th Avenue | —N/a | 7 | |
| Samuel Kendrick Farmhouse | | 1840 | Georgian | 4822 19th Avenue | —N/a | 6 | |
| Chauncy Crosby House | | 1840 | Georgian | 10451 Highway 48 (Note: The original address listed for the building was 8150 Markham Road.) | —N/a | 5 | |
| William Reynolds House | | 1840 | Ontario Cottage & Regency | 7482 Highway 7 East | —N/a | 5 | |
| Adam Hagler House | | 1840 | Georgian & Vernacular | 39 Artisan Trail (Note: The original address listed for Adam Hagler House was 10327 Woodbine Avenue. The building was relocated to 39 Aritsan Trail in the late-2010s.) | —N/a | 2 | |
| William Grant House | | 1840 | Georgian & Vernacular | 2665 Bur Oak Avenue (Note: The original address listed for William Grant House was 7006 16th Avenue and later 2667 Bur Oak Avenue.) | —N/a | 5 | |
| 15 Colborne Street | | 1840 | Georgian & Vernacular | 15 Colborne Street | Thornhill | 1 | |
| John Jacob Lunau House | | 1840 | Gothic Revival | 12 David Gohn Circle (Note: The original address listed for John Jacob Lunau House was 8030 Warden Avenue. The building was later relocated to 12 David Gohn Circle.) | —N/a | 4 | |
| William Macklin House | | 1840 | Neoclassical | 2501 Denison Street (Note: The original address listed for William Macklin House was 2501 McCowan Road. The building's address was later changed to 2501 Denison Street.) | —N/a | 7 | |
| 4478 Elgin Mills Road East | | 1840 | Neoclassical | 4478 Elgin Mills Road East | —N/a | 6 | |
| Adam Clendenen House | | 1840 | Georgian | 8 Green Hollow Court (Note: The original address listed for Adam Clendenen House was 9516 Ninth Line. The building's address was later changed to 8 Green Hollow Court.) | —N/a | 5 | |
| John Reesor House | | 1840 | Georgian, Gothic Revival & Vernacular | 1 Kalvinster Drive (Note: The original address listed for John Reesor House was 6937 Highway 7.) | —N/a | 5 | |
| St. Philip's Anglican Church Manse | | 1840 | Georgian | 9418 Kennedy Road | —N/a | 6 | |
| Sommerfeldt Homestead | | 1840 | Georgian | 10379 Kennedy Road | —N/a | 6 | |
| James and Sarah Osborn Double House | | 1840 | Georgian | 61 Main Street Markham North (Note: The original address listed was 63–65 Main Street Markham North. The building's address was later changed to 61 Main Street Markham North.) | Markham Village | 4 | |
| Old Presbyterian Manse | | 1840 | Neoclassical | 89 Main Street Markham South | Markham Village | 4 | |
| Jacob Pingle Sr. House | | 1840 | Vernacular | 4638 Major Mackenzie Drive East | —N/a | 6 | |
| William and Elizabeth McLaughlin House | | 1840 | Georgian | 5480 Major Mackenzie Drive East | —N/a | 6 | |
| William Read House | | 1840 | Georgian | 9899 Markham Road | —N/a | 4 | |
| 11137 McCowan Road | | 1840 | Neoclassical | 11137 McCowan Road | —N/a | 6 | |
| Abraham Koch House | | 1840 | Georgian | 16 Moore's Court (Note: The original address listed for Abraham Koch House was 7085 14th Avenue.) | —N/a | 7 | |
| Samuel Reesor Homestead | | 1840 | Georgian | 7450 Reesor Road (Note: The original address listed for Samuel Reesor Homestead was 7454 Reesor Road.) | —N/a | 7 | |
| White Hill Mills House | | 1840 | Georgian | 7939 Reesor Road | —N/a | 7 | |
| Noble Tenant Farmer House | | 1840 | Georgian | 11122 Reesor Road | —N/a | 5 | |
| Peterson-Jarvis House | | 1840 | Gothic Revival | 99 Thoroughbred Way (Note: The original listed address for 99 Thoroughbred Way was 9721 McCowan Road, and later 9804 Kennedy Road.) | —N/a | 6 | |
| 46 Timbermill Crescent | | 1840 | Neoclassical | 46 Timbermill Crescent (Note: The original address listed for 46 Timbermill Crescent was 5815 16th Avenue. In 2007, the building changed its address to 46 Timbermill Crescent.) | —N/a | 4 | |
| Alexander McPherson House | | 1840 | Georgian | 31 Victory Avenue | —N/a | 8 | |
| Schell House | | 1840 | Gothic Revival & Vernacular | 11242 Warden Avenue | —N/a | 2 | |
| Buttonville Mill House | | 1840 | | 2 Yans Way (Note: The original address listed for Butonville Mill House was 9064 Woodbine Avenue. The building's address was later changed to 2 Yans Way.) | Buttonville | 2 | |
| William Cornelius Home | | 1840 | Gothic Revival & Vernacular | 8346 York Durham Line | —N/a | 7 | |
| Tomlinson-Smith House | | 1841 | Georgian | 7662 Ninth Line | —N/a | 7 | |
| Briarwood Farm | | 1842 | Georgian | 4031 16th Avenue | —N/a | 3 | |
| George Pingle Jr. House | | 1842 | Gothic Revival & Vernacular | 4022 Major Mackenzie Drive East | —N/a | 6 | |
| John Lane House | | 1842 | Gothic Revival & Vernacular | 111 John Street | Thornhill | 1 | |
| Almira Flour and Woolen Mill | | 1844 | Georgian | 4160 19th Avenue | —N/a | 6 | |
| John G. Mustard House | | 1844 | Georgian | 11091 Woodbine Avenue | —N/a | 6 | |
| John Klein House/James Bowman House | | 1844 | Georgian | 4165 19th Avenue | —N/a | 6 | |
| 170 John Street | | 1845 | Neoclassical | 170 John Street | Thornhill | 1 | |
| Almira Mill Workers Cottage | | 1845 | Georgian & Vernacular | 4176 19th Avenue | —N/a | 6 | |
| Archibald Fenwick House | | 1845 | Ontario Cottage & Regency | 7 Heritage Corners Lane (Note: The original address listed was 4551 Elgin Mills Road East. The building was later relocated to 7 Heritage Corners Lane.) | —N/a | 4 | |
| Crinklewood Mansion | | 1845 | Georgian & Neoclassical | 54 Crinklewood Crescent | Thornhill | 1 | |
| Lane House | | 1845 | Georgian | 26 John Street | Thornhill | 1 | |
| Thomas Lownsborough House | | 1845 | Gothic Revival & Vernacular | 9392 Kennedy Road | —N/a | 6 | |
| Samuel Eakin House | | 1845 | Ontario Cottage & Regency | 10725 Kennedy Road | —N/a | 6 | |
| John Edey House | | 1845 | Neoclassical | 4 Leahill Drive | Thornhill | 1 | |
| Workers' Cottage | | 1845 | Ontario Cottage & Regency | 260 Main Street Unionville | Unionville | 3 | |
| Richard and Margaret Sylvester House | | 1845 | Georgian | 88 Main Street Markham South | Markham Village | 4 | |
| Thomas Peach House | | 1845 | Georgian | 10387 McCowan Road | —N/a | 6 | |
| Phillip Eckardt Jr. House | | 1845 | Georgian | 60 Meadowbrook Lane (Note: The original address listed for Phillip Eckardt Jr. House was 23 Meadowbrook Lane.) | —N/a | 3 | |
| 11303 Warden Avenue | | 1845 | Georgian | 11303 Warden Avenue | —N/a | 6 | |
| Robert A. West General Store | | 1845 | Neoclassical | 7771 Yonge Street | Thornhill | 1 | |
| William Lane House | | 1846 | Georgian | 14 Colborne Street | Thornhill | 1 | |
| Goodfellow/Arthur Lismer House | | 1846 | Georgian | 22 John Street | Thornhill | 1 | |
| Union Mills House | | 1846 | Gothic Revival & Vernacular | 209 Main Street Unionville | Unionville | 3 | |
| 7699 Yonge Street | | 1846 | Georgian | 7699 Yonge Street | Thornhill | 1 | |
| St. Luke's Roman Catholic Church and Manse | | 1847 | Gothic Revival | 15 Church Lane | Thornhill | 1 | |
| First Unionville Congregational Church | | 1847 | Vernacular | 149 Main Street Unionville | Unionville | 3 | |
| Warren Bishop House | | 1847 | Georgian | 26 David Gohn Circle (Note: The original address listed for Warren Bishop House was 7850 Ninth Line. The building was later relocated to 26 David Gohn Circle.) | —N/a | 4 | |
| Ninth Line Baptist Church | | 1848 | Gothic Revival | 9350 Markham Road (Note: The following is the address for the Markham Museum. The individual buildings at the Markham Museum do not have an address. The Ninth Line Baptist Church was originally located on Ninth Line, north of Major Mackenzie Drive. The building was relocated to the museum in 1981.) | —N/a | 4 | |
| William Morrison House | | 1848 | Georgian | 12 Buttonville Crescent West | Buttonville | 2 | |
| Joseph Marr House | | 1848 | Georgian | 3 Heritage Corners Lane (Note: The original address listed for Joseph Marr House was 8992 Reesor Road. The building was later relocated to 3 Heritage Corners Lane.) | —N/a | 4 | |
| Ambrose Noble House | | 1848 | Georgian & Neoclassical | 11 Heritage Corners Lane (Note: The original address listed for Ambrose Noble House was 9251 Highway 48. The building was later relocated to 11 Heritage Corners Lane.) | —N/a | 4 | |
| Frizzell House | | 1848 | Gothic Revival & Vernacular | 18 John Street | Thornhill | 1 | |
| Holy Anne's Cottage | | 1848 | Georgian | 32 John Street | Thornhill | 1 | |
| Abraham B. Ramer House | | 1848 | Georgian | 304 Main Street Markham North | Markham Village | 4 | |
| Henry Pingle House | | 1849 | Arts and Crafts | 11 Tannis Street (Note: The original address listed for Henry Pingle House was 9765-9767 Kennedy Road.) | —N/a | 6 | |
| 31 Colborne Street | | 1850 | Georgian | 31 Colborne Street | Thornhill | 1 | |
| 10701 Highway 48 | | 1850 | Georgian & Edwardian | 10701 Highway 48 | —N/a | 5 | |
| 10535 McCowan Road | | 1850 | Georgian | 10535 McCowan Road | —N/a | 6 | |
| 11287 McCowan Road | | 1850 | Neoclassical | 11287 McCowan Rd | —N/a | 6 | |
| Brother Haton House | | 1850 | Georgian | 10754 Victoria Square Boulevard (Note: The original address listed for Old Driveshed in Victoria Square was 10762 Woodbine Avenue. The building's address was changed in 2015 due to the construction of the Woodbine Avenue bypass.) | —N/a | 2 | |
| Christian Hoover House | | 1850 | Georgian | 11274 Highway 48 | —N/a | 6 | |
| Daniels Fairty House | | 1850 | Neoclassical | 7060 Markham Road | —N/a | 7 | |
| David Burke House | | 1850 | Georgian | 10531 Reesor Road | —N/a | 5 | |
| David Chapman House | | 1850 | Neoclassical | 148 John Street (Note: The original address listed for David Chapman House was 7396 Yonge Street. The building was relocated to 148 John Street in 1980.) | Thornhill | 1 | |
| Henry and Susan Wideman House | | 1850 | Neoclassical | 10484 Ninth Line | —N/a | 5 | |
| Jacob Pingle House | | 1850 | Gothic Revival & Vernacular | 8 David Gohn Circle (Note: The original address listed for Jacob Pingle House was on McCowan Road. The building was later relocated to 8 David Gohn Circle.) | —N/a | 4 | |
| Jacob Ramsay House | | 1850 | Vernacular | 20 David Gohn Circle (Note: The original address listed for Jacob Ramsay House was 248 Main Street Unionville. The building was later relocated to 20 David Gohn Circle.) | —N/a | 4 | |
| Jacob Size House | | 1850 | Gothic Revival | 16 David Gohn Circle (Note: The original address listed for Jacob Ramsay House was 9782 Kennedy Road. The building was later relocated to 16 David Gohn Circle.) | —N/a | 4 | |
| James Collins House | | 1850 | Georgian | 11223 Reesor Road | —N/a | 5 | |
| James Dimma House | | 1850 | Georgian | 7933 14th Avenue | —N/a | 7 | |
| John Koch House/Formerly The Jacob Wideman House | | 1850 | Georgian & Regency | 10062 Highway 48 | —N/a | 6 | |
| John Cameron Jr House | | 1850 | Georgian | 25 Fairway Heights Drive | Thornhill | 1 | |
| John Pool House | | 1850 | Georgian | 9768 Reesor Road | —N/a | 5 | |
| John Ramer Homestead and Barn | | 1850 | Gothic Revival & Vernacular | 6278 19th Avenue | —N/a | 5 | |
| John Stiver House | | 1850 | Neoclassical | 1 Millbrook Gate | Buttonville | 2 | |
| Mills Double Cottage 1 | | 1850 | Georgian | 37 Colborne Street | Thornhill | 1 | |
| Mills Double Cottage 2 | | 1850 | Georgian | 39 Colborne Street | Thornhill | 1 | |
| Nicholas Reesor House and Frame House | | 1850 | Georgian | 8724 Reesor Road (Note: The original address listed for Nicholas Reesor House and Frame House was 8662 Reesor Road.) | —N/a | 5 | |
| Old Driveshed in Victoria Square | | 1850 | Gothic Revival | 10762 Victoria Square Boulevard (Note: The original address listed for Old Driveshed in Victoria Square was 10762 Woodbine Avenue. The building's address was changed in 2015 due to the construction of the Woodbine Avenue bypass.) | —N/a | 2 | |
| Phillips-Teasdale House | | 1850 | Gothic Revival | 4 Alexander Hunter Place (Note: The original address listed for Phillips-Teasdale House was 9206 Leslie Street. The building was later relocated to 4 Alexander Hunter Place.) | —N/a | 4 | |
| Smith House | | 1850 | Neoclassical | 7507 Kennedy Avenue | —N/a | 8 | |
| William Forster House | | 1850 | Georgian | 527 William Forster Road (Note: The original addresses listed for William Forster House was 8882 Reesor Road, and later 1982 Donald Cousens Parkway.) | —N/a | 5 | |

==== Map of listed pre-1851 buildings ====
Present location of buildings and structures built before 1851 in Markham. Asterisks (*) indicate a building that was moved from its original site.: 1800 to 1810; 1811 to 1820; 1821 to 1830; 1831 to 1840; 1841 to 1850; 1 Philip Eckardt Log House 2 Christian Reesor Homestead 3 20 Ruggles Avenue 4 Heintzman House 5 David Whaley House 6 Joshua Miller House* 7 Christian K. Hoover House* 9 4130 19th Avenue 10 Gapper-Duncan House* 11 Johnston-Barker House 12 Byer Family Home 13 Eckardt-Stiver House 14 Thomas and Sarah Hasty House 15 Peter Reesor Homestead 16 Nathan Chapman Jr. House* 17 Cashel Road House 18 John Wurtz House 19 Joseph & Sarah Henderson House 20 Unionville Wheelwright and Blacksmith Snop 21 George Miller House 22 David Badgerow House 23 Samuel Kendrick Farmhouse 24 Chauncy Crosby House 25 William Reynolds House 26 Adam Hagler House* 27 William Grant House 28 15 Colborne Street 29 John Jacob Lunau House* 30 William Macklin House 31 4478 Elgin Mills Road East 32 Adam Clendenen House 33 John Reesor House 34 St. Philip's Anglican Church Manse 35 Sommerfeldt Homestead 36 James and Sarah Osborn Double House 37 Old Presbyterian Manse 38 Jacob Pingle Sr. House 39 5480 Major Mackenzie Drive East 40 William Read House 41 11137 McCowan Road 42 Abraham Koch House 43 Samuel Reesor Homestead 44 White Hill Mills House 45 Noble Tenant Farmer House 46 Peterson-Jarvis House 47 46 Timbermill Crescent 48 Alexander McPherson House 49 Schell House 50 Buttonville Mill House 51 William Cornelius Home 52 Tomlinson-Smith House 53 Briarwood Farm 54 George Pingle Jr. House 55 John Lane House 56 Almira Flour and Woolen Mill 57 John G. Mustard House 58 John Klein House/James Bowman House 59 170 John Street 60 Almira Mill Workers Cottage 61 Archibald Fenwick House* 62 Crinklewood Mansion 63 Lane House 64 Thomas Lownsborough House 65 Samuel Eakin House 66 John Edey House 67 Workers' Cottage 68 Richard and Margaret Sylvester House 69 Thomas Peach House 70 Phillip Eckardt Jr. House* 71 11303 Warden Avenue 72 Robert A. West General Store 73 William Lane House 74 Goodfellow/Arthur Lismer House 75 Union Mills House 76 7699 Yonge Street 77 St. Luke's Roman Catholic Church and Manse 78 First Unionville Congregational Church 79 Warren Bishop House* 80 Ninth Line Baptist Church* 81 William Morrison House 82 Joseph Marr House* 83 Ambrose Noble House* 84 Frizzell House 85 Holy Anne's Cottage 86 Abraham B. Ramer House 87 Henry Pingle House 88 31 Colborne Street 89 10701 Highway 48 90 10535 McCowan Road 91 11287 McCowan Road 92 Brother Haton House 93 Christian Hoover House 94 Daniels Fairty House 95 David Burke House 96 David Chapman House* 97 Henry and Susan Wideman House 98 Jacob Pingle House* 99 Jacob Ramsay House* 100 Jacob Size House* 101 James Collins House 102 James Dimma House 103 John Koch House/Formerly The Jacob Wideman House 104 John Cameron Jr House 105 John Pool House 106 John Ramer Homestead and Barn 107 John Stiver House 108 Mills Double Cottage 1 109 Mills Double Cottage 2 110 Nicholas Reesor House and Frame House 111 Old Driveshed in Victoria Square 112 Phillips-Teasdale House* 113 Smith House 114 William Forster House

== List of notable demolished buildings (pre-1851) ==
The following were notable buildings and structures that were erected in Markham by 1850, but were later demolished:

| Building | Location | Year Completed | Comment | Image |
|---|---|---|---|---|
| Lutheran School House | Located north side of Lutheran Cemetery at Berczy Historical Settlement in Berczy Village | c. 1800s | Little details available but school offered schooling in German only led by Rev. George Sigmund Liebich | |
| School Section # 9 | SE corner of Main Street Unionville and Highway 7 | 1832 | Was main school for Unionville until #10 built 1858; location likely in vacant lot once occupied by service station. | |
| School Section #10 | Main Street Unionville, now north parking lot at Unionville Public School | c. 1830s | Replaced by new schoolhouse in 1892, additions added in 1949 and 1955; demolished and replaced 1977 | |
| Union Mills | Along Rouge River in Unionville | 1841 | Burned down 1934; located on west side of Main Street South and Rouge River (near site of Bill Crothers Secondary School) | |
| Grace Anglican Church | 8th Line (Markham Main Street South) and Old Wellington Street | 1848 | Demolished 1963 and now site of Esso gas station. Grace Church moved to Parkway Avenue. | |
| Thomas Speight Wagon Works Factory | approximately 20 Main Street North (west) and 25 Main Street North (east), Markham Village | c. 1840s | Originally on west side and later moved to east side of Main Street; operations ceased in 1917 and burned down with garage in 1922; both sites now occupied by commercial buildings | |
| Ratcliff Sawmill | Lot 35, Concession 6 (Stouffville Road and Kennedy Road), Stouffville | c. 1840s–1850s | Built by William Ratcliff and remained operational until 1970s, but destroyed by fire 1982, but mill equipment saved and used in Ashmore Reesor's mill at Markham Museum. Family owned Century Mill Lumber continues to operate on site | |

== See also ==
- History of Markham, Ontario
- List of oldest buildings in Canada
