= Wisner Township =

Wisner Township may refer to the following places:

- Wisner Township, Franklin County, Iowa
- Wisner Township, Tuscola County, Michigan
- Wisner Township, Cuming County, Nebraska

== See also ==
- Wisner (disambiguation)
