= History of Markham, Ontario =

History of Canadian city

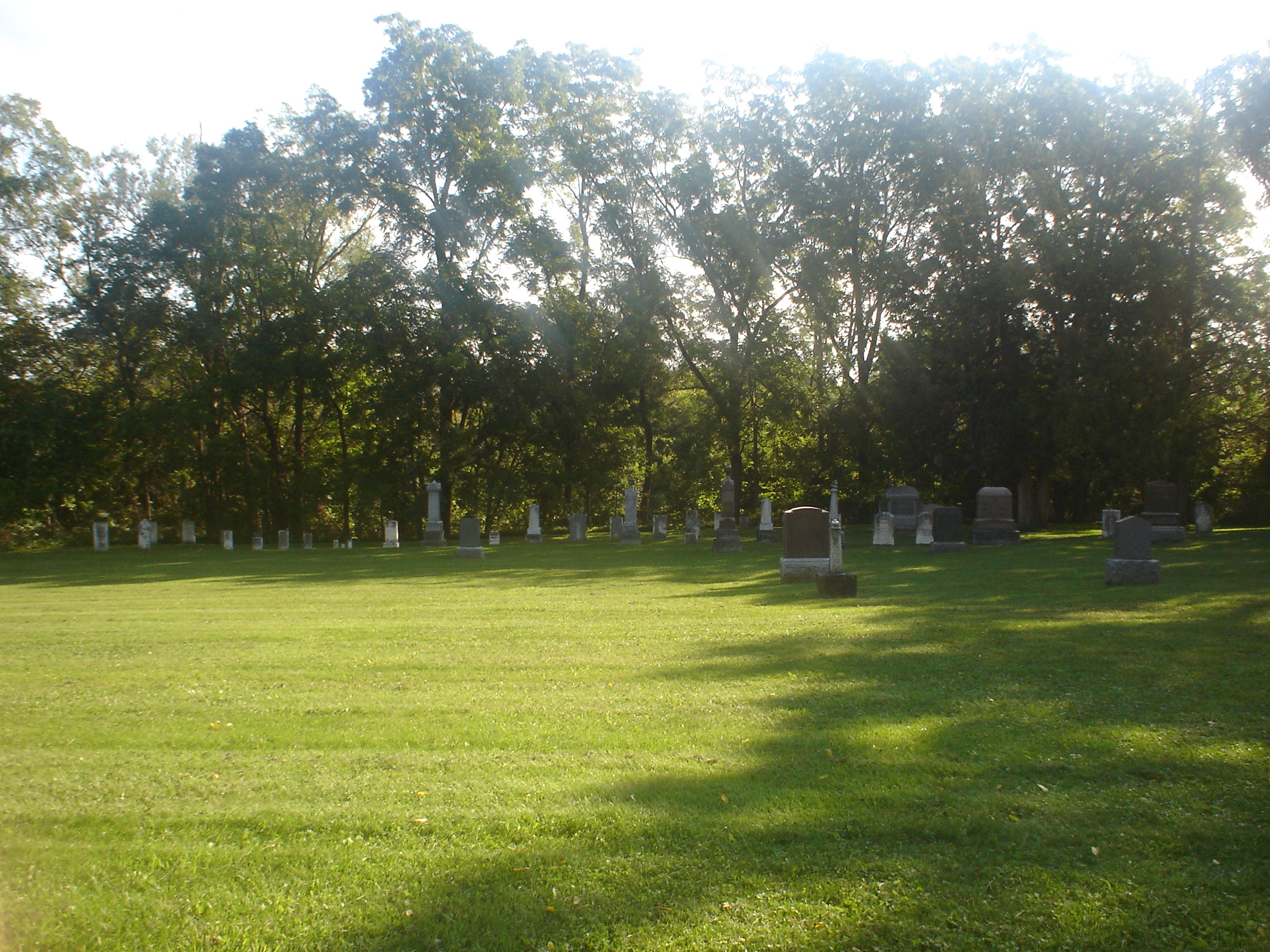
St. John's Lutheran Cemetery in Markham dates to the 1820s, decades after European settlement of the area.

The history of Markham, Ontario dates back several millennia. What would become Markham, Ontario was home to First Nations long before European settlement. Seasonal settlements were found from 900 BC to 1650, but traces of these first residence were buried before the area was farmed.

== 18th century ==
What would become western end of Markham was acquired in the Toronto Purchase in 1787 and eastern parts under the Rouge Tract Claim or Gunshot Treaty (Johnson-Butler Purchase) 1788 covering most of Markham, as well as Stouffville and Scarborough.

When Upper and Lower Canada were established in 1791, Colonel John Graves Simcoe was appointed the first Lieutenant-Governor of Upper Canada. Simcoe named the township of Markham, north of the town of York (now Toronto), after his friend William Markham, the Archbishop of York.

Markham Township was originally surveyed in 1793–94, but not until 1801 was the township divided into 10 concession roads (now named as Street, Avenue, Road or Line) running north and south, with six sideroads running east–west (now numbered avenues or named Drive or Road). Many of these concession and sideroads in Markham still exist today. Eventually, the boundaries of Markham occupied the area, as follows:

- NORTH: Whitchurch Town Line (Between 19th Avenue and Stouffville Side Road)
- SOUTH: Scarborough Town Line (Steeles Avenue)
- EAST: Pickering Town Line
- WEST: Vaughan Town Line (Yonge Street)

In 1794, William Berczy led 64 German families from New York State to Markham Township, an area known as German Mills today. Each family was granted 200 acres (0.8 km^{2}). Because of hardships, many returned to York and Niagara and the area became a ghost town. In 1797, because of the revolution in France in 1789, many nobility fled the country and set off for Canada to take advantage of free land grants in Upper Canada. They were totally unprepared for survival under such crude conditions and most of them returned to their homeland.

== 19th century ==
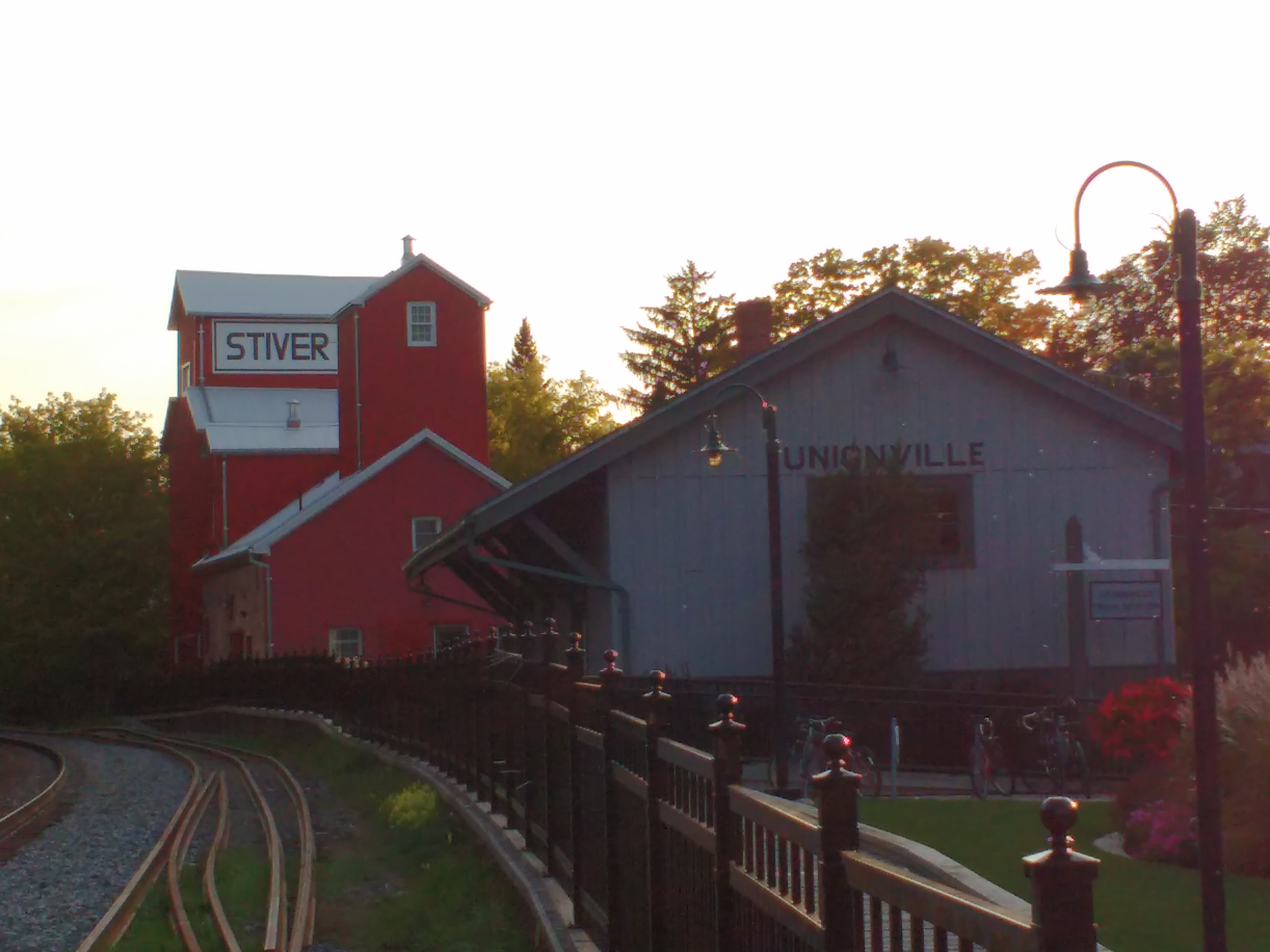
Built in 1871 by Toronto and Nipissing Railway, Unionville Station brought renewed prosperity and rapid development to the area.

From 1803 to 1812, the largest group of settlers were Pennsylvania Germans, most of whom were Mennonites. These highly skilled craftsmen and knowledgeable farmers had the best chance for survival because they had already survived harsh conditions in Pennsylvania. Prior to 1825 the community is referred to as Reesorville. In 1805 the details of the Toronto Purchase were clarified. From 1830 on, many Irish, Scottish and English emigrated to Upper Canada to escape the famine and overpopulation of their homeland.

Markham's early years blended the rigours of homesteading with the development of agriculture-based industries. The many rivers and streams in the Township soon supported water-powered saw and grist mills and, later, woollen mills. With improved transportation routes, such as Yonge Street and the growing population, urbanization increased. In 1850 the Township of Markham was created and by 1857 most of the Township had been cleared of timber and was under cultivation. Villages like Thornhill, Unionville and Markham greatly expanded and new, specialized industries such as wagon works, tanneries, farm implement and furniture factories sprang up.

In 1871, the Toronto and Nipissing Railway Company, with stations in Unionville and Markham, officially opened its line from Scarborough to Uxbridge. Initially, the railway brought renewed prosperity and rapid development. Farmers and millers had a more convenient means of transporting their products to Toronto. Other merchants had easier access to supplies and business boomed.

The first form of structured municipal government occurred in 1850 when the Township of Markham was created. On November 20, 1872, the Warden of York County signed the By-law of Incorporation, which provided for the election of a Council for the Village of Markham. The Village of Markham grew to a population of 1100 by 1891.

== 20th century ==
The increased communication with Toronto brought on by the railway and further enhanced by the development of the telegraph, the telephone and the automobile, ultimately led to the demise of the villages in the Township after the turn of the century. Local industries were simply unable to compete with the larger manufacturers and suppliers of Toronto, and Markham soon reverted to a quiet, rural community.

=== Post-World War II development ===
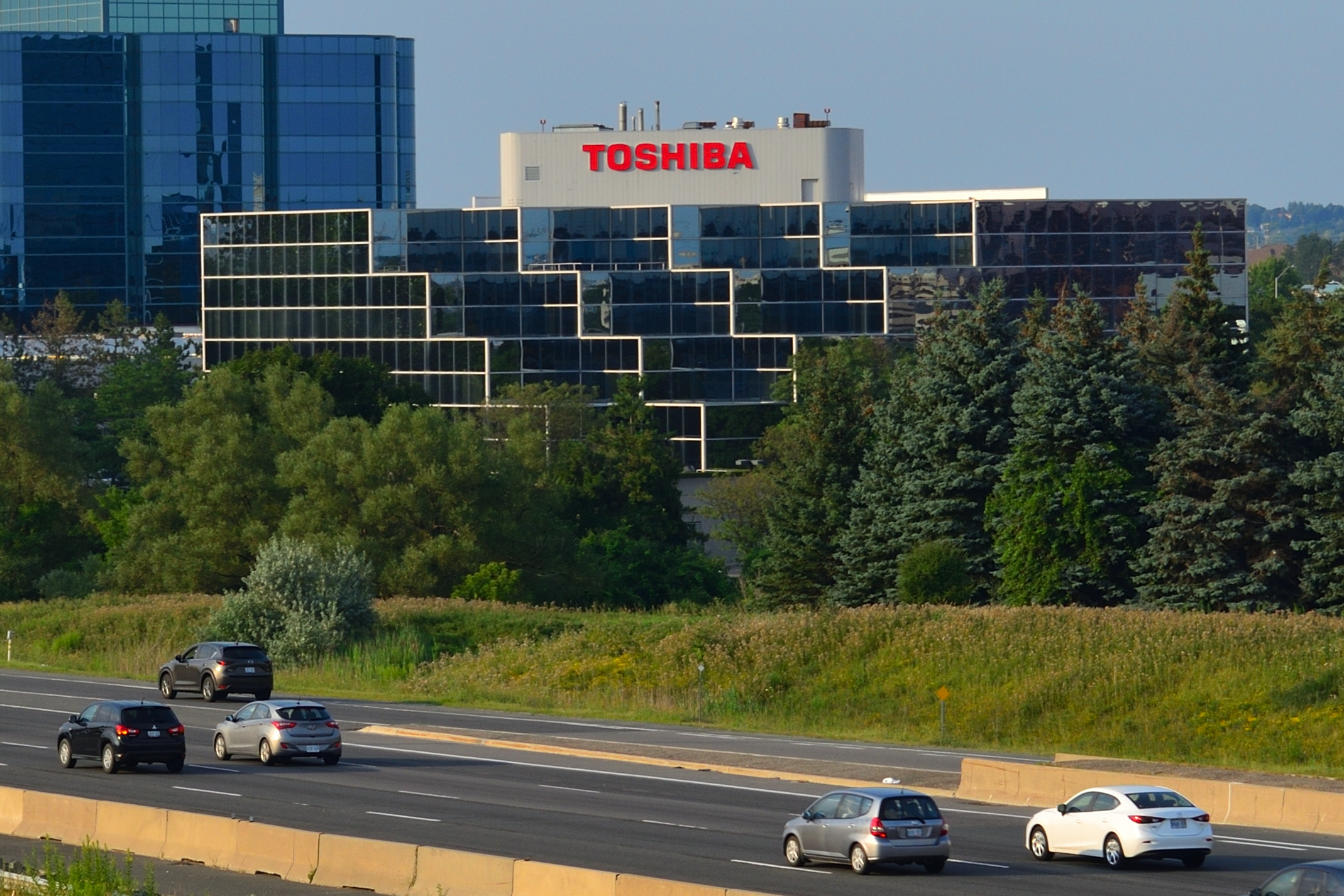
Toshiba Canada headquarters, north of Highway 7 and west of Highway 404. Highway 404 north of Highway 7 was named the new western boundary for Markham in 1971.

Following World War II, the face of Markham began to change rapidly. It was no longer a community whose inhabitants worked mainly within the area. It evolved into a fast-growing suburb, where the majority of its residents commuted into Toronto. As a result, rural Markham disappeared in the face of tremendous urban growth.

By 1969, the Township of Markham consisted of several villages, including Markham, Unionville, and parts of Thornhill. In 1971, the Regional Municipality of York was established by the Government of Ontario. Northern portions of Markham Township were annexed to the municipalities of Richmond Hill and Whitchurch-Stouffville (four farm lots south of Main Street Stouffville), while the balance of Markham Township was incorporated in the Town of Markham and the present town boundaries set.

The boundaries of Markham were altered following the reorganization of York County into York Region. Its present boundaries include begins at the southeastern corner, the boundary stretches northward along the York-Durham Line until approximately one half concession between 19th Avenue and Stouffville Side Road. The boundary continues westward until it reaches highway 404, where it runs in a southerly direction until intersecting Regional Road Seven, (formerly King's Highway 7.) From this point it stretches westward following Langstaff Road until Yonge Street, and travels south until Steeles Avenue East. The Southern border straddles the centre line of Steeles Avenue East until it reaches the city's southeastern corner at the York-Durham Line. All boundaries and concessions are straight lines at slightly more than a right angle to each other, forming a geographical area roughly in the shape of two connected parallelograms.

In 1976, Markham's population was approximately 56,000. Since that time, the population has more than quadrupled. Explosive growth in new subdivisions has led to a jump in population since the 1980s. Much of Markham's farm land has disappeared, now found well north of 16th Avenue. Concerns from environmentalist and concerns with the future of the Oak Ridges Moraine will impact the extent of growth of the northern portion of Markham.

At present Markham comprises several distinct communities: Markham Village, Cornell, Unionville, Wismer Commons, Milliken and Thornhill. Since the 1980s the town has been recognized as a suburb of Toronto, though it has an independent economy. Many high-tech industries have located in Markham for the relative abundance of land, low tax rates and good transportation routes. Advanced Micro Devices Canada, IBM Canada, Motorola Canada and many other well-known companies have chosen Markham as their home in Canada. Hence, the town branding itself as Canada's "High-Tech Capital". Although with further and more diverse growth, the Town of Markham has become the City of Markham and is now branding itself the "Diversity Capital of Canada".

== 21st century ==
In 2012, Markham Town Council voted to change its status from town to city.

== See also ==
- List of historic buildings in Markham, Ontario
