= Leslie Street =

North–south route in Ontario, Canada

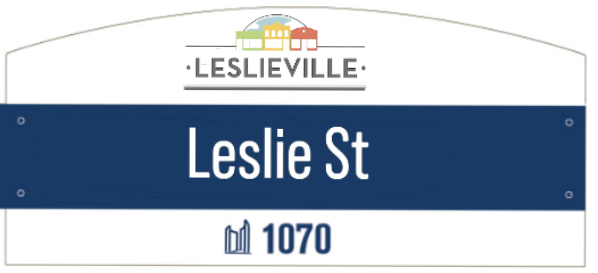
- York Regional Road 12
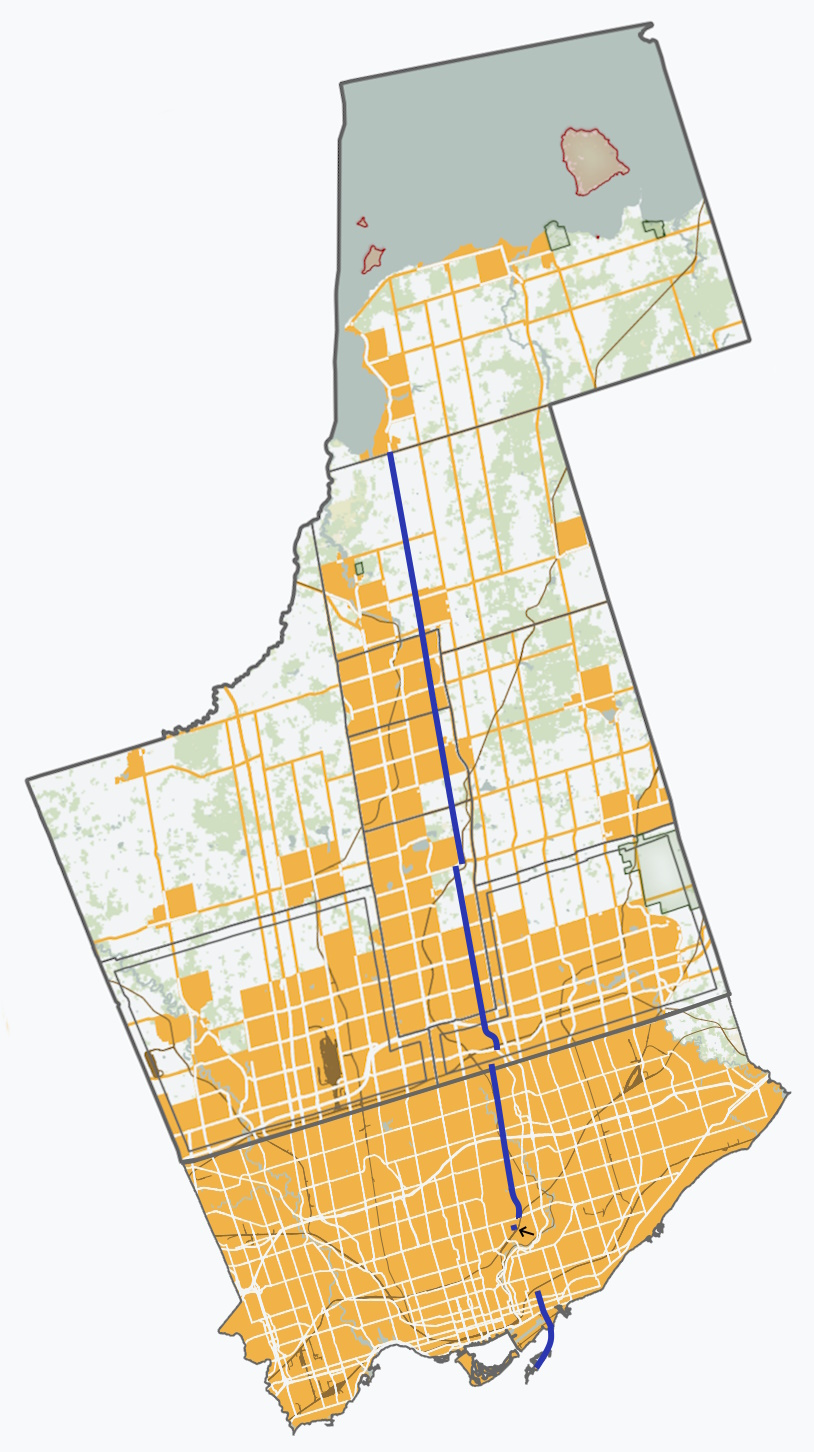
- Route of Leslie Street through Toronto and York Region (blue line)
- Maintained by: City of Toronto; Region of York
- Length: 46 km (29 mi)
- Location: Toronto; Markham; Richmond Hill; Aurora; Newmarket; East Gwillimbury; Georgina
- South end: Leslie Street Spit in Toronto
- Major junctions: Lake Shore Boulevard; Queen Street; Dundas Street; Gerrard Street —Road breaks— (Intervening minor segment) —Road breaks— Eglinton Avenue; Lawrence Avenue; Highway 401; Sheppard Avenue; Finch Avenue; Steeles Avenue —Road breaks— John Street; Highway 407; Highway 7; 16th Avenue; Major Mackenzie Drive; Stouffville Road; Bloomington Road; Wellington Street; St. John’s Sideroad; Mulock Drive; Davis Drive; Green Lane; Mount Albert Road; Queensville Sideroad
- North end: Ravenshoe Road in Georgina (continues as The Queensway South)

Other
Nearby arterial roads
← Pape Avenue; Bayview Avenue	Greenwood Avenue; Don Valley Parkway / Highway 404 →

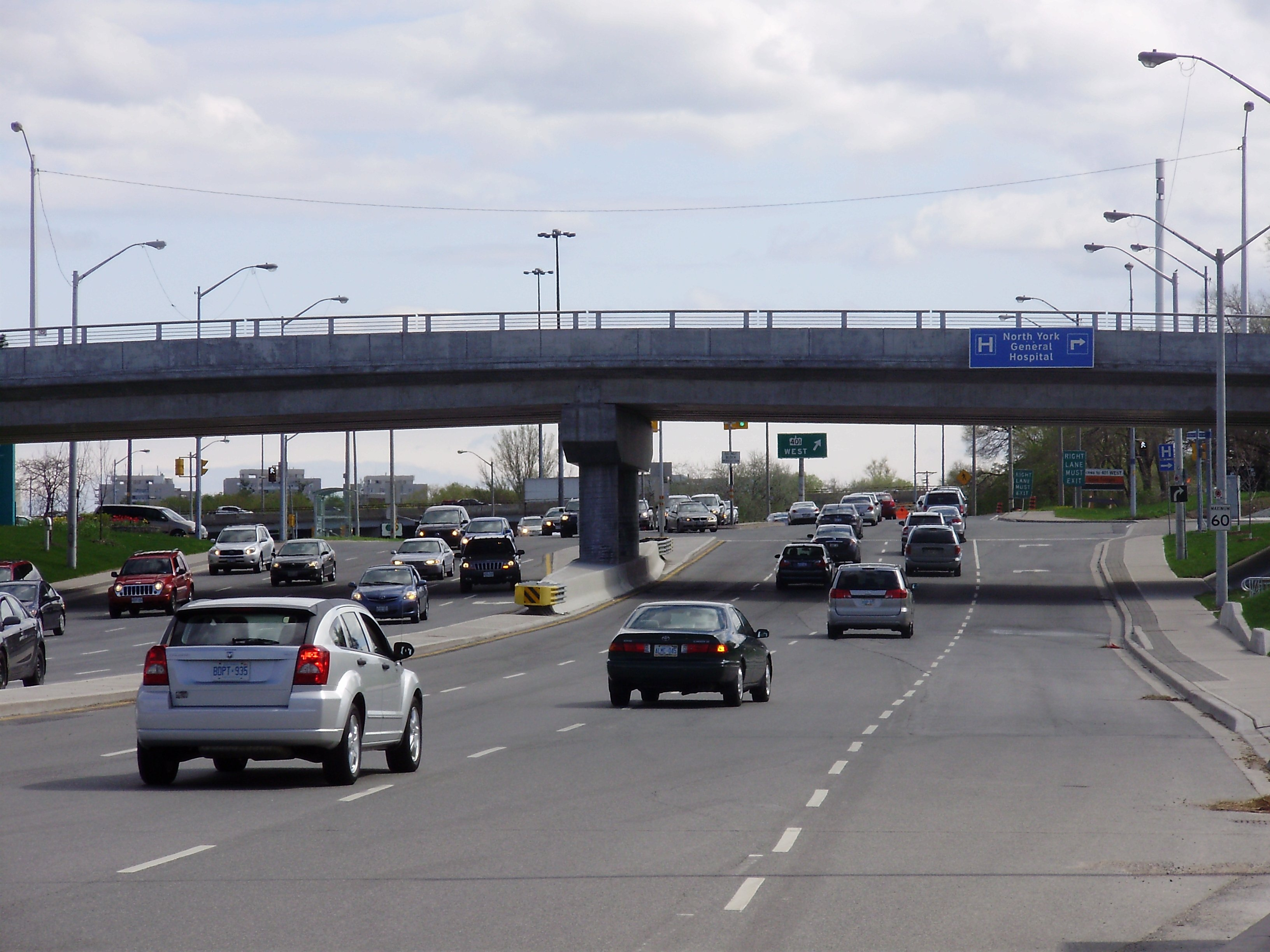
Looking south along the third segment of Leslie Street, in North York

Leslie Street is a north–south route in Toronto and York Region, Ontario, Canada. It is distinctive because of its four unconnected segments.

== History ==
The road has a long history and dates back to 1850s Toronto Nursery that was run by George Leslie. Leslie was one of the first settlers in the area, at the time a community named Leslieville, located two miles east of the city limits of Toronto at the time. There were two Leslies mentioned in the city directory of 1869, G. Leslie and Sons of the nursery fame and George Leslie Jr. who ran the post office and, by 1899, the telegraph station.

The concession road that passed close to the nursery was later named after the Leslies, running as far north as the Grand Trunk Railway (now Canadian National Railway) tracks, with an unopened road allowance continuing north to Danforth Avenue. North of Danforth, the open concession resumed to end at the Don River Valley (near present-day O'Connor Drive), but that section is named Donlands Avenue today.

The section north of Eglinton Avenue originally terminated near Lawrence Avenue in the south, but was extended to meet Eglinton in the 1950s through a more northerly area of the Don valley. This was done in tandem to connect two separate sections of Eglinton across the valley to meet the Leslie extension.

== Route description ==
In Toronto, the route begins at Lake Ontario at the foot of the Leslie Street Spit, so named because this is the most southerly point of Leslie Street. Just north at Lake Shore Boulevard East was the former eastern terminus of the Gardiner Expressway. Leslie Street continues north to railway tracks north of Gerrard Street East, where the first segment ends. Donlands Avenue, which runs from Danforth Avenue to north of O'Connor Drive, follows Leslie's alignment and was originally another segment of it.

The second segment is a side street running only a single block from Wicksteed Avenue to Research Road, then curving west to become Vanderhoof Avenue in the Leaside Business Park. It is separated from the third segment by the Ernest Thompson Seton parklands.

The third segment begins as a principal arterial road at Eglinton Avenue at the E.T. Seton / Wilket Creek Park area and continues north through residential neighbourhoods in Don Mills and the Don Valley. A proposed extension from Eglinton Avenue south to Bayview Avenue at Nesbitt Drive never came to fruition. The street numbers change erratically near Highway 401, going from the 4400 block at Sheppard Avenue to the 2000 block under the Canadian National Railway tracks in a short distance. It exits Toronto and enters York Region at Steeles Avenue, west of Don Mills Road. Leslie is reduced to a local road at Steeles Avenue and ends shortly thereafter in Wycliffe Park.

Leslie's fourth segment continues and resumes as an arterial road north of John Street, where the parallel Don Mills Road ends and turns into said segment. After a short curved realignment connecting to the end of Don Mills, this section rejoins the same alignment as the more southerly sections. There is a small jog in the road at Stouffville Road in Richmond Hill, and two sets of lights were installed in the summer of 2006 to ease the morning traffic congestion. Leslie extends 29 kilometres (18 mi) northward to the town of Keswick where it becomes the Queensway South.

The stretch of Leslie Street in York Region is also designated as York Regional Road 12.

== Landmarks ==
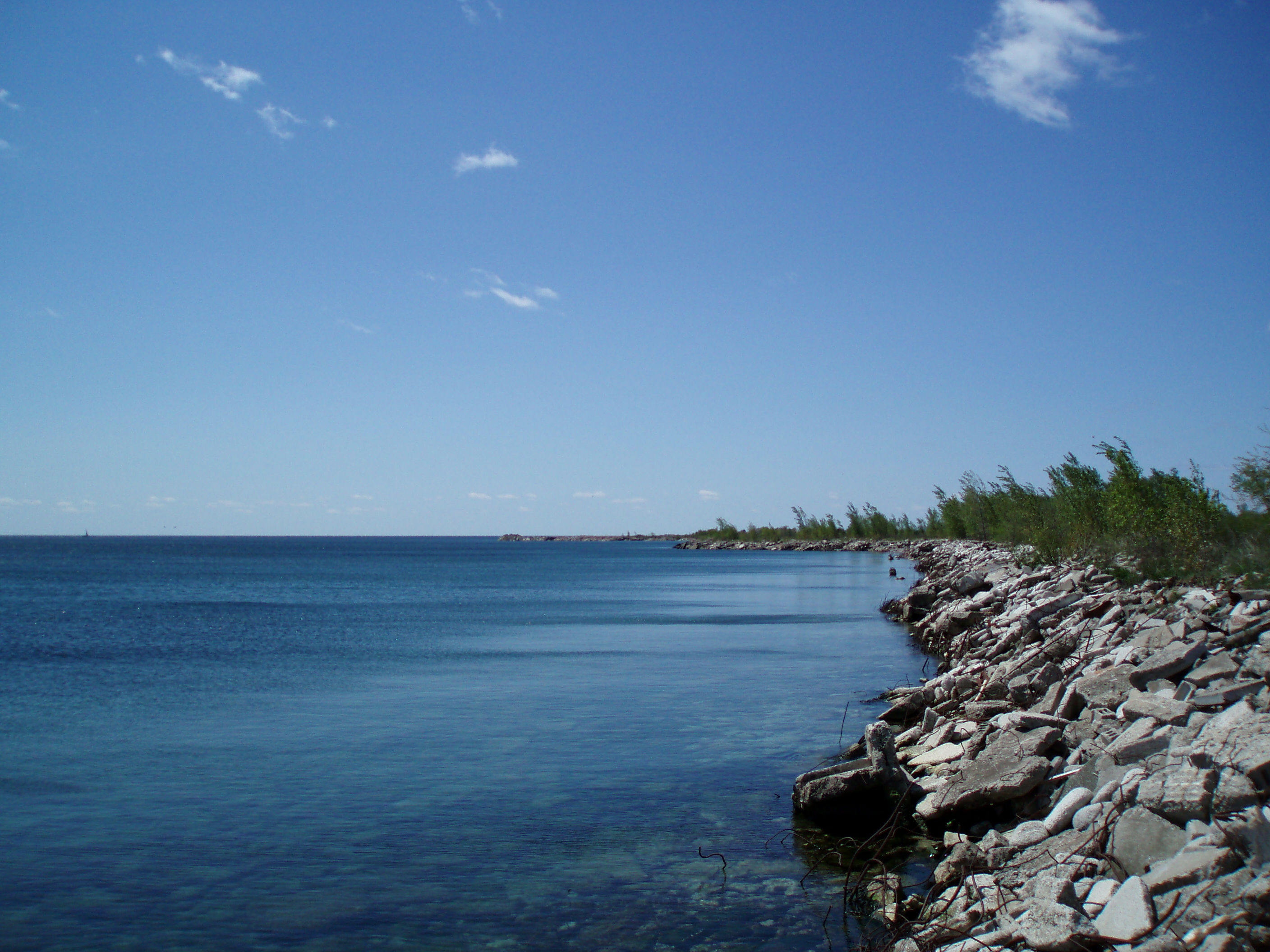
Leslie Street Spit

- Leslie Street Spit (Tommy Thompson Park)
- Sunnybrook Park
- Inn on the Park
- Edwards Gardens
- Leslie station (on Line 4 Sheppard) and Oriole GO Station
- North York General Hospital
- Historic Zion Schoolhouse
- Old Cummer GO Station
- Sharon Temple

== Sources ==
- Muir, E.G. (2014). Riverdale: East of the Don. Dundurn. ISBN 978-1-4597-2872-1.
