= Wisner =

Wisner may refer to:

== People ==
- Wisner (surname)

== Places ==
In the United States:

- Wisner, Louisiana, a town in Franklin Parish
- Wisner, Nebraska, a city in Cuming County
- Wisner Township, Michigan, a township in Tuscola County
- Wisner Township, Cuming County, Nebraska

== See also ==
- Wiesner
