= Hillary House and Koffler Museum of Medicine =

House and museum in Aurora, Ontario, Canada

Hillary House National Historic Site
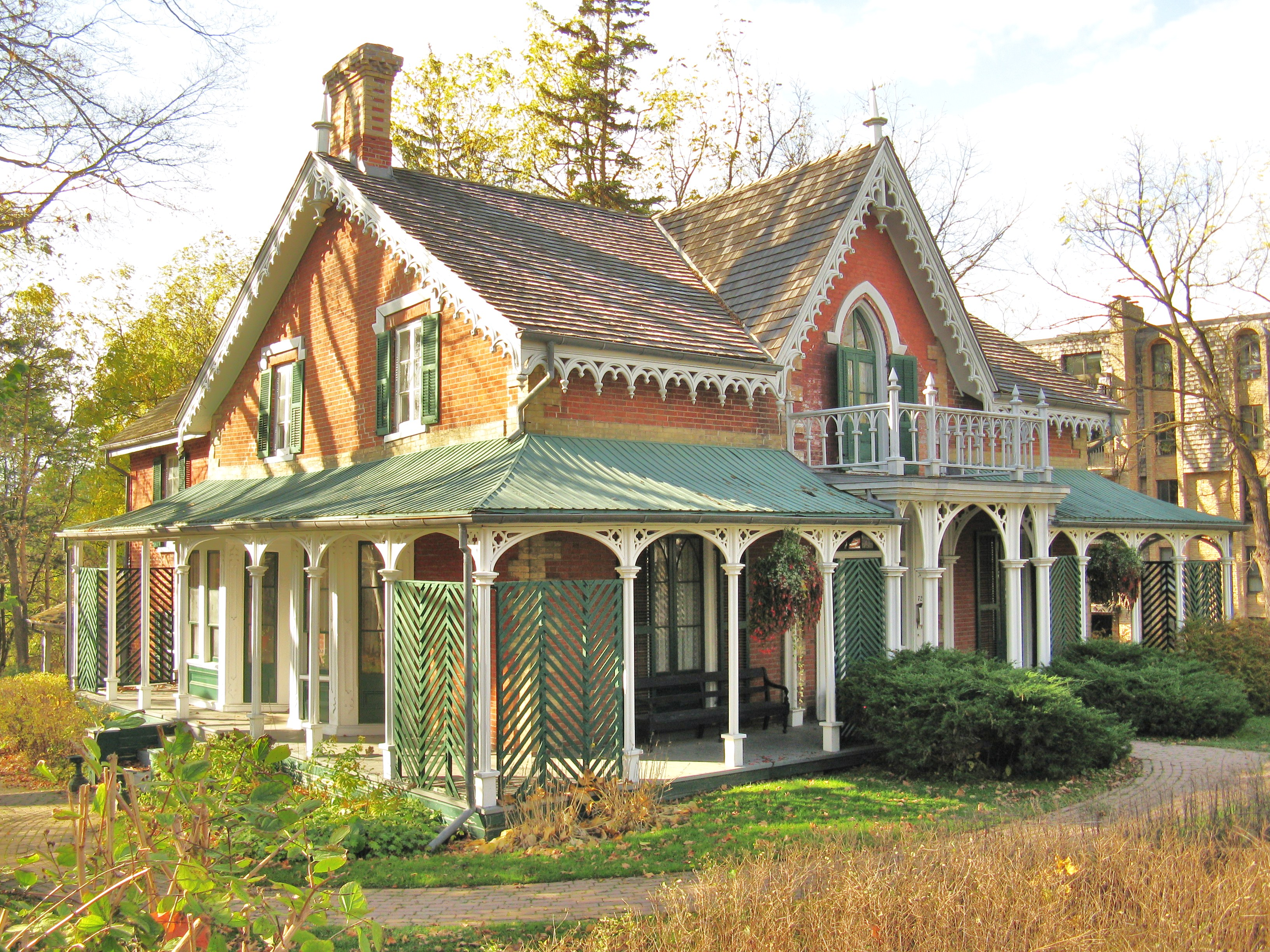

- Aurora, ON
- Established: 1862
- Location: 15372 Yonge Street, Aurora, ON. L4G 1N8
- Coordinates: 44.002803°N 79.468628°W
- Public transit access: GO Transit
- Website: Hillary House

National Historic Site of Canada
- Designated: 1973

Hillary House, the Koffler Museum of Medicine is a Gothic Revival house and a museum in Aurora, Ontario, Canada. Built in 1862, it is recognized by the National Historic Sites and Monuments Board as one of the best examples of Gothic Revival architecture in Canada. The building contains a collection of medical instruments, books, papers, household furnishings, and equipment dating from the early nineteenth to the late twentieth century. It has been owned by the Aurora Historical Society since 1981 and is open to the public as Hillary House, the Koffler Museum of Medicine.

== History ==
Four doctors have lived in Hillary House with their families. They worked from home; operating their medical practice out of the dispensary and consulting room located in the front of the house. The doctors also spent a significant amount of time travelling to the homes of their patients via horse and buggy, serving Aurora and the surrounding area. Each doctor became an important part of the fabric of the community, and the Hillary family descendants would live in the home for over 100 years.

- 1862 – 69: Hillary House is built for Dr. Water Bayne Geikie, b. 1830 in Scotland, d. 1917. Lived in the house with his wife Miriam Woodhouse (m.1854), and his 4 children.
- 1869 – 76: Dr. Frederick William Strange, Surgeon Lieutenant-Colonel to the Royal Regiment of Canadian Infantry (b. 1844 in England, d. 1897). Lived in the house with his wife, Esther Rose, and daughter who died at age 3.
- 1876 – 1894: Robert William Hillary (b. 1832 in Ireland, d. 1894). Lived in the house with his wife Annie Fry (d. 1904) and their 7 children.
- 1894: Robert Michael Hillary acquired property from the mortgage holders. Married Edith Mussen 1895 and lived in house with their 9 children.

Nora Hillary, daughter of Robert Michael, would live in the home until 1993.

== Architecture ==
In the 18th century, a growing spirit of Romanticism and interest in the Medieval past led to a revival of Gothic styles in Britain. The style made its way to Canada in the early 19th century. As the style became accepted and popular, architects became more willing to experiment and modify its conventions. Gothic Revival spread throughout the country, appearing on buildings of all types, from civic buildings to churches to rural homes such as Hillary House and ultimately becoming part of Canadian Nationalism. Hillary House, completed in 1862, has many elements of the Gothic Revival style which was widely used in Canada at the time. These elements include a highly vertical emphasis on the structure; ornate decorations on the gables and bargeboards; the incorporation of classic Gothic trefoil forms; and lancet windows and door frames. These features are found on the exterior of the home and throughout the interior; appearing on staircases, wainscoting and more. The building’s architecture was the cause for its designation as a National Historic Site in 1971.

== See also ==
- Sharon Temple National Historic Site
- McMichael Canadian Art Collection
- Markham Museum
- Ontario Cottage
