= John Street (Markham) =

Street in Markham, Ontario

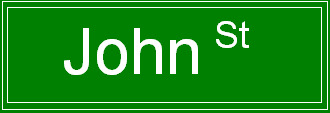

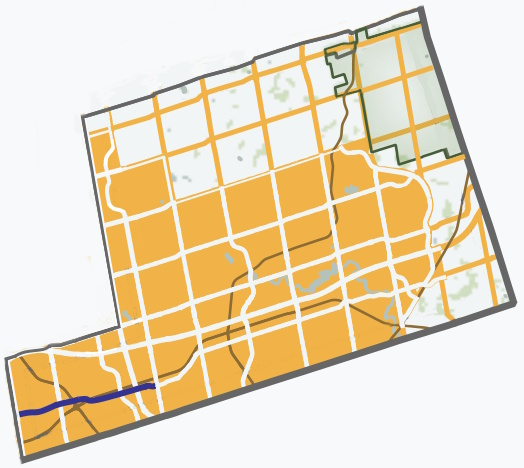
- Route of John Street in Markham (blue line)
- Maintained by: City of Markham
- Length: 6.0 km (3.7 mi)
- Location: Markham, York Region
- West end: Yonge Street
- Major junctions: Bayview Avenue; Don Mills Road / Leslie Street
- East end: Woodbine Avenue (continues as Esna Park Drive)

Construction
- Inauguration: 1800s

Other
Nearby arterial roads
← Steeles Avenue	Highway 7 →

John Street is an east-west collector and arterial road in the City of Markham, Ontario, Canada. It is one of the oldest roads in the Markham and forms the east-west backbone of the 200-year-old community of Thornhill.

The street originally ran east from Yonge Street across a tributary of the Don River, at which point it branched north to what is now Leslie Street and south on German Mills Road. This was a travelled road which did not match the alignment of any concession road or lot line and was constructed along the most convenient route to farms and mills to serve the needs of the inhabitants at that time.

John Street has had a major impact in shaping the community; the parallel 14th Avenue east-west concession road allowance (today named Green Lane) was never fully opened and Leslie Street still diverts from the route laid out by the township survey to join Don Mills Road near the former easterly end of John Street. However, in the late 20th century an extension of the street across Highway 404 to Woodbine Avenue, did ultimately link the street with 14th Avenue at Warden Avenue via Esna Park Drive and Alden Road, which themselves bypass another section of 14th Avenue.

== Route Description ==
John Street is a four-lane arterial road between Woodbine Avenue and Bayview Avenue, and due to the presence of Thornhill village, a two-lane local collector street between Yonge and Bayview. East of Bayview, John Street currently serves to relieve traffic on Steeles Avenue, and Highway 7. John Street also serves as a western extension (and bypass) of 14th Avenue via Alden Road and Esna Park Drive. The combined roadway (although not including John itself, nor most of Alden or any of Esna Park), as well as part of the offset Centre Street in the City of Vaughan west of Yonge, is designated York Regional Road 71.

Between Bayview Avenue and Yonge Street, there are several stop signs along the two-lane section. This part of the street goes up and down through valleys and ridges. As it approaches Pomona Mills Park, the landscape becomes more level. Along this section of the road, the roadway is narrow. When the road approaches Yonge, light residential areas are found.

Between Bayview Avenue and Leslie Street, John Street has seven intersections with traffic lights. The road is fairly straight, and heads in a southeasterly direction. West of Leslie Street, the street heads into a steep valley, and rise up again shortly to meet Leslie Street. Between Leslie and Highway 404, the road passes by the R.J Clatworthy arena and Bishops Cross Park. Between Highway 404 and Woodbine Avenue, all zonings are industrial.

John Street forms a link in what is otherwise the first concession road north of Steeles Avenue, with 14th Avenue, Centre Street, and the portion of Highway 7 west of Dufferin Street. However, due to the aforementioned presence of Thornhill village and the desire to eliminate a jog in Highway 7 (which east of Dufferin, follows the next concession to the north) by the Province of Ontario, the concession alignment was never developed into a single, continuous cross-region arterial.

== History ==
A historic map of John Street in the Township of Markham

This road, along with many side streets in Thornhill, is one of the oldest roads in Markham, with over 200 years of history. The road is believed to be built in the 19th century, named after John Colborne along with Colborne Street, immediately south of John Street. John Street was believed to be built around 1828-1836. Prior to that, Thornhill was a little community with houses along Yonge Street. John Street allowed eastward developments. The development of Thornhill in the 19th century stopped at what is now Henderson Avenue, and along the section of John Street between Yonge Street and Henderson Avenue are developments from that time. The area is now preserved under the city of Markham's Heritage Department. Along John Street in this area, the road signs are labelled as "Old Thornhill Circa 1794". This part of John Street is also considered as the heart of Old Thornhill.

The road is also home to the Sutton Frizzel's house. Originally located on Yonge and Royal Orchard, it was moved in the 20th century due to the widening of Yonge Street. It was built by the Tory Loyalist in the 19th century, and its original occupants played a significant role in the Rebellions of 1837.

In the 20th century, as Markham's population rapidly grew, John Street was extended to its current length, with modern housing along the road.

In 2004, the corner of John and Bayview was redeveloped into medium dense residential. This redevelopment has been referred to as "Olde Thornhill Village".

== Landmarks ==
- Sutton Frizzell's House, 18 John Street.
- Thornhill Cemetery (1867)
- Pomona Mills Park
- Thornhill Community Centre has two ice rinks, 3 community halls, an auditorium and a library.
- John Welsh House (known as Thornlea), 288 John Street, now 'Santorini Bar & Grill'
- Thornhill Square Shopping Centre, 300 John Street, now mostly demolished and replaced by a Townhouse development.
- R.J. Clathworthy Arena is equipped with one ice rink.
- Bishops Cross Park has a major baseball and soccer field, along with playgrounds and running track.

== Public transit ==
York Region Transit operates Route #2 (Milliken) on John Street east of Henderson Avenue at the following frequencies:

- 20-25 minutes during weekday rush hour
- 30-40 minutes during weekday off-peak hours
- 35 minutes on Saturdays
- 67 minutes on Sundays
