= Mile Road System (Michigan) =

Several counties in the state of Michigan use a Mile Road System to name different roads and streets. The most commonly known system is that of Detroit, including 8 Mile Road, the dividing line between Detroit and its northern suburbs as well as Wayne County and Oakland, Macomb and Washtenaw counties. The roads in the Detroit-area system are laid out in a grid and named with reference to a zero-mile "point of origin" in Campus Martius Park in downtown Detroit.

== Bay County ==
In Bay County, roads west of the Saginaw River are numbered with the river (or, north of the river, State Street) marking the origin.

- 0 Mile—Saginaw River
- 1 Mile—Euclid Avenue
- 2 Mile—Two Mile Road
- 3 Mile—Three Mile Road
- 4 Mile—Four Mile Road
- 5 Mile—Mackinaw Road
- 6 Mile—Fraser Road
- 7 Mile—Seven Mile Road
- 8 Mile—Eight Mile Road
- 9 Mile—Nine Mile Road
- 10 Mile—Garfield Road
- 11 Mile—Eleven Mile Road
- 12 Mile—Carter Road
- 13 Mile—Flajole Road
- 14 Mile—Rockwell Road (Bay–Midland county line)
- 15 Mile—Waldo Road
- 16 Mile—Jefferson Road
- 17 Mile—Eastman Road
- 18 Mile—Sturgeon Road
- 19 Mile—Dublin Road
- 20 Mile—Stark Road
- 21 Mile—Hope Road
- 22 Mile—Meridian Road
- 23 Mile—Water Road
- 24 Mile—Flock Road (Lake Sanford Road)

== Calhoun County ==
Going east from the county line between Calhoun and Kalamazoo counties. Many of the roads are known by both their mile names and their traditional names.

- 0 Mile—Calhoun–Kalamazoo county line
- 1/2 Mile—1/2 Mile Road
- 1 Mile—1 Mile Road, Renton Road
- 1 1/2 Mile—1 1/2 Mile Road
- 2 Mile—Stone Jug Road
- 2 1/2 Mile—2 1/2 Mile Road
- 3 Mile—Helmer Road
- 3 1/2 Mile—3 1/2 Mile Road
- 4 Mile—Sonoma Road
- 4 1/2 Mile—4 1/2 Mile Road
- 5 Mile—Capital Avenue
- 6 Mile—Cotton Lake Road
- 6 1/2 Mile—6 1/2 Mile Road
- 7 Mile—7 Mile Road
- 7 1/2 Mile—Beadle Lake Road
- 8 Mile—Union City Road
- 8 1/2 Mile—Woodlin Road
- 9 Mile—9 Mile Road
- 9 1/2 Mile—9 1/2 Mile Road, Wattles Road
- 10 Mile—Cady Road
- 10 1/2 Mile—Jessup Road
- 11 Mile—Wheatfield Road
- 11 1/2 Mile—11 1/2 Mile Road
- 12 Mile—12 Mile Road
- 13 Mile—13 Mile Road
- 14 Mile—14 Mile Road
- 15 Mile—15 Mile Road
- 16 Mile—16 Mile Road
- 16 1/2 Mile—16 1/2 Mile Road, Linden Street
- 17 Mile—Kalamazoo Avenue, Old 27
- 17 1/2 Mile—Marshall Avenue
- 18 Mile—18 Mile Road
- 18 1/2 Mile—18 1/2 Mile Road
- 19 Mile—19 Mile Road
- 20 Mile—20 Mile Road
- 21 Mile—21 Mile Road
- 22 Mile—22 Mile Road
- 22 1/2 Mile—22 1/2 Mile Road
- 23 Mile—23 Mile Road
- 24 Mile—24 Mile Road
- 25 Mile—25 Mile Road
- 26 Mile—Starr Commonwealth Road
- 27 Mile—27 Mile Road
- 28 Mile—Duck Lake Road, Eaton Road
- 28 1/2 Mile—Maple Street
- 29 Mile—Clark Street
- 29 1/2 Mile—Newburg Road
- 30 Mile—Van Wert Road, Calhoun Road

== Metropolitan Detroit ==
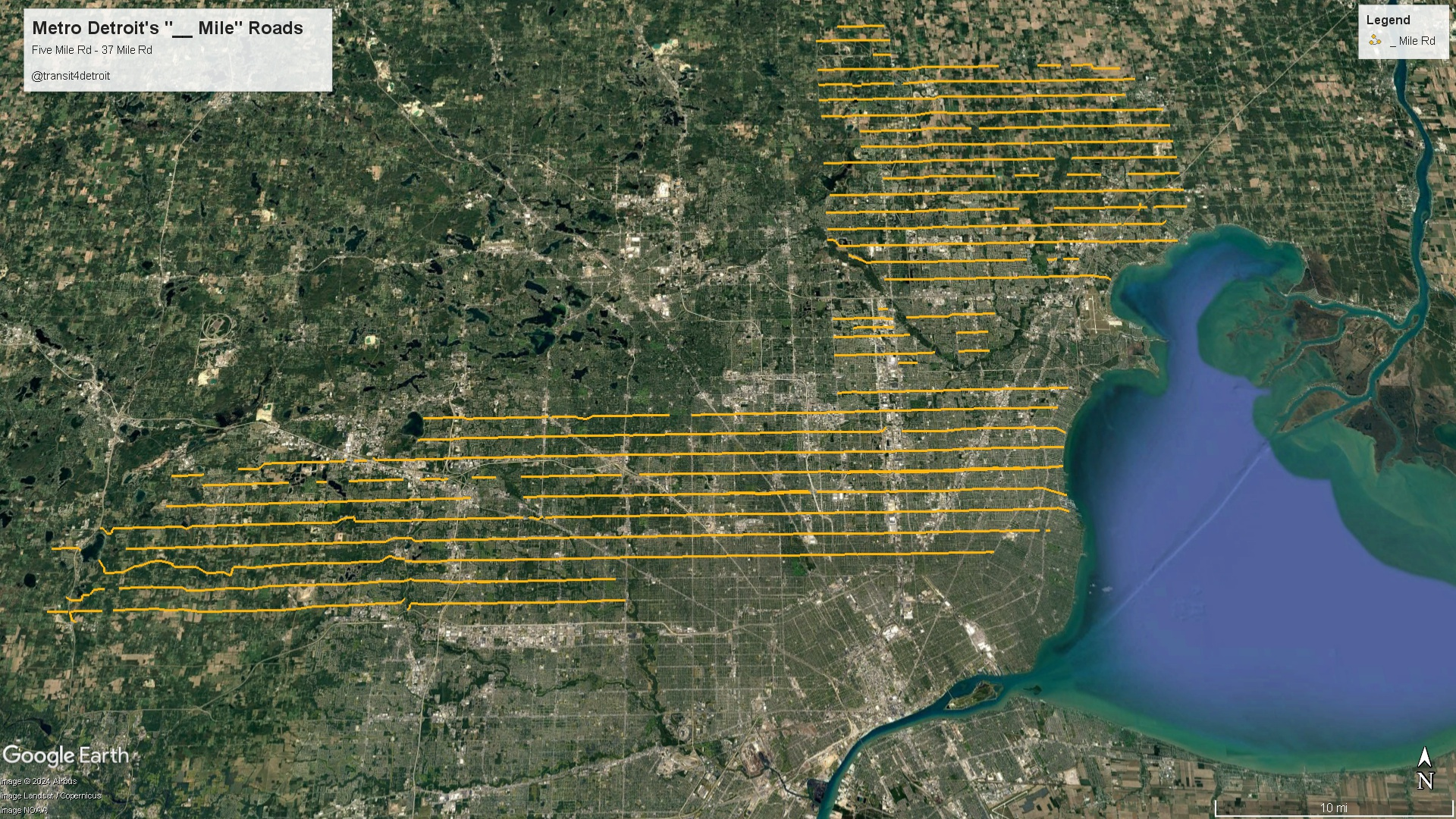
Metro Detroit's "_ Mile Rd" System

The mile roads are measured from the distance from Michigan Avenue in Detroit. So 5 Mile road is 5 miles from Michigan Avenue, 8 Mile is 8 miles from Michigan Avenue, and so on. (In most of Detroit, Michigan Avenue runs east west, it veers southwest at Springwells Street). Ford Road begins at Wyoming at the same latitude).

- Ford Road (equivalent of 0 Mile Road, western city, suburbs)
- Paul Street is generally the equivalent of 1/2 Mile Road on Detroit's West Side (housing and industrial areas cut Paul Street off in several sections, but it generally follows the same east-west route)
- Warren Avenue (equivalent of 1 Mile Road, western city, suburbs)
- Tireman Avenue is the equivalent of 1 1/2 Mile Road (Detroit's West Side)
- Joy Road (equivalent of 2 Mile Road in Washtenaw and Wayne counties)
- Chicago Street is the equivalent of 2 1/2 Mile Road (Detroit West Side)
- Plymouth Road (equivalent of 3 Mile Road, western city, suburbs)
- Fullerton Street is the equivalent of 3 1/2 Mile Road (Detroit West Side)
- Schoolcraft Road (equivalent of 4 Mile Road, western city, suburbs)
- Lyndon Street is the equivalent of 4 1/2 Mile Road (West of Livernois Avenue, Detroit's West Side)
- 5 Mile Road—Fenkell Avenue (in Detroit)
- Puritan Street is the equivalent of 5 1/2 Mile Road (Detroit's West Side)
- 6 Mile Road—McNichols Avenue (in Detroit)
- Curtis Avenue is the equivalent of 6 1/2 Mile Road (Detroit's West Side)
- 7 Mile Road—No other name (Ends at the curve west of Kelly Road. Moross Avenue in Grosse Pointe is not a mile road)
- 7 1/2 Mile Road—State Fair Street. (Outer Drive E in Eastbound direction starting at Dequindre Street. Returns to E State Fair Avenue at Conner Street. Pembroke Avenue is the equivalent of 7 1/2 Mile Road west of the Woodlawn Cemetery and Woodward Avenue. Continues through parts of the western suburbs)
- 8 Mile Road—Baseline Road (old name), (Ends at Helen Street. east of Harper in Grosse Pointe Woods, with a 1-block stretch running east from Greater Mack. Vernier Road is not a mile road as 8 Mile Road continues east from point where Vernier branches off)
- 8 1/2 Mile Road—Toepfer Road (By alignment only. 1/2 mile road designation not used)
- 9 Mile Road—School Road (old name)
- 9 1/2 Mile Road—Stephens Road (By alignment only. 1/2 mile road designation not used)
- 10 Mile Road—Kern Road (old name), Labadie Road (old name, St. Clair Shores)
- 10 1/2 Mile Road—Frazho Road (Macomb County) (By alignment only. 1/2 mile road designation not used) Lincoln Avenue (Oakland County)
- 11 Mile Road—Townhall Road (old name)
- 11 1/2 Mile Road—Catalpa Drive (West of N. Main Street) Gardenia Avenue (East of N. Main Street in Royal Oak) Martin Road (Macomb County) (By alignment only. 1/2 mile road designation not used)
- 12 Mile Road—Champagne Road (old name)
- 12 1/2 Mile Road—Common Road. (By alignment only. 1/2 mile road designation not used)
- 13 Mile Road—Chicago Road (old name) Canfield Road in Roseville, Couchez Road in St. Clair Shores (old names)
- 13 1/2 Mile Road—Masonic Boulevard. (By alignment only. 1/2 mile road designation not used)
- 14 Mile Road—Townline Road (old name)
- 14 1/2 Mile Road—Quinn Road. (By alignment only. 1/2 mile road designation not used)
- 15 Mile Road—Wolf Road (old name, Macomb County), Maple Road (Oakland County)
- 16 Mile Road—Metropolitan Parkway (Macomb County), Big Beaver Road, Quarton Road, Walnut Lake Road (Oakland County) Nunneley Road in Clinton Township (old name)
- 16 1/2 Mile Road—(In Sterling Heights) Lone Pine Road (Oakland County)
- 17 Mile Road—Wattles Road (Oakland County)
- 18 Mile Road—Long Lake Road (Oakland County)
- 18 1/2 Mile Road—(In Sterling Heights)
- 19 Mile Road—Square Lake Road (Oakland County)
- 19 1/2 Mile Road—(In Sterling Heights)
- 20 Mile Road—Hall Road (Macomb County), Dobry Drive (Utica County), South Boulevard (Oakland County)
- 21 Mile Road—Shoemaker Road (old name, Macomb County), Auburn Road (Oakland County)
- 22 Mile Road—Waldenburg Road (old name, Macomb County), Hamlin Road, Featherstone Road (Oakland County)
- 23 Mile Road—Telegraph Road, Old Telegraph Road, Whiskey Road, Coldwater Road, New Baltimore Highway, Yates Road (old names, Macomb County), Avon Road (Oakland County)
- 24 Mile Road—Cemetery Road, French Road (old names, Macomb County), Disco Road (old name, Oakland County), Parkdale Road, Walton Boulevard (Oakland County)
- 25 Mile Road—Arnold Road, Runyon Road (old names, Macomb County), Runyon Road, Tienken Road (Oakland County)
- 26 Mile Road—Town Line Road, Marine City Highway (old names, Macomb County), Mead Road, Dutton Road, Brown Road (Oakland County)
- 27 Mile Road—Davis Road, Big Stone Road (old names, Macomb County), Silverbell Road (Oakland County)
- 28 Mile Road—Gass Road (old name, Macomb County), Gunn Road, Waldon Road (Oakland County)
- 29 Mile Road—Knight Road (old name, Macomb County), Buell Road (Oakland County)
- 30 Mile Road—Sikes Road (old name, Macomb County), Parks Road, Stoney Creek Road, Clarkston Road (Oakland County)
- 31 Mile Road—Hart Road (old name, Macomb County), Predmore Road (Oakland County)
- 32 Mile Road—Division Road in Richmond; Fred Moore Highway, east of Richmond, Macomb County, Romeo Road (Oakland County)
- 33 Mile Road—Schooley Road (old name, Macomb County), Brewer Road, Drahner Road (Oakland County)
- 34 Mile Road—Woodbeck Road (old name, Macomb County), Mack Road, Lakeville Road (Oakland County)
- 35 Mile Road—School Road (old name, Macomb County), Frick Road (Oakland County)
- 36 Mile Road—Dewey Road (old name, Macomb County), Noble Road (Oakland County)
- 37 Mile Road—315th Street (old name, Macomb County), Gerst Road, Oakwood Road (Oakland County)
- 38 Mile Road-Bordman Road (old name, Macomb County), Davidson Lake Road (Oakland County)

== Grand Traverse County ==
In Grand Traverse County, the mile roads are numbered from the location of the Boardman River and the ghost town of Keystone, named after its location at an important point on the river.

- 0 Mile—Keystone Road, Boardman River
- 1 Mile—Garfield Avenue, Garfield Road
- 2 Mile—Town Line Road (former name)
- 3 Mile—Three Mile Road
- 4 Mile—Four Mile Road
- 5 Mile—Five Mile Road, High Lake Road
- 6 Mile—Six Mile Road, Haaland Road
- 7 Mile—Lautner Road
- 8 Mile—Bates Road
- 9 Mile
- 10 Mile—Williamsburg Road

== Kent County ==
Fulton Street is the north–south dividing line of the city of Grand Rapids. But since Fulton Street is on a half-section line, Michigan Street is the baseline in Kent County, not Fulton Street.

- 0 Mile—Michigan Street
- 1 Mile—Leonard Street
- 2 Mile—Knapp Street (a separate 2 Mile Road exists east of the Grand River, where Knapp curves north to what would theoretically be 2 1/2 Mile Road)
- 3–21 Mile—3–21 Mile roads
- 22 Mile—22 Mile Road (Kent–Montcalm and Kent–Newaygo county lines)

== Manistee County ==
In Manistee County, roads are numbered north from the village of Eastlake

- 0 Mile—M-55
- 1 Mile—Pine Creek Road
- 2 Mile—Guenthardt Road
- 3 Mile—Becker Road, River Road
- 4 Mile
- 5 Mile—River Road
- 6 Mile—Coates Highway
- 7 Mile—Kerry Road
- 8 Mile—8 Mile Road
- 9 Mile—9 Mile Road
- 10 Mile—Maidens Road
- 11 Mile—11 Mile Road
- 12 Mile—Potter Road
- 13 Mile—13 Mile Road
- 14 Mile
- 15 Mile—Alkire Road
- 16 Mile—Lumley Road
- 17 Mile—Glovers Lake Road
- 18 Mile—Manke Road, Kernberger Road)
- 19 Mile—County Line Road (Manistee-Benzie County Line)

== Midland County ==
- 0 Mile—Downtown Midland, marked by the line formed by Eastman Avenue and Poseyville Road—located exactly four miles west of Rockwell Road
- 1 Mile—Patterson Road
- 2 Mile—Vance Road
- 3 Mile—Sandow Road
- 4 Mile—Homer Road
- 5 Mile—Five Mile Road
- 6 Mile—Meridian Road
- 7 Mile—Seven Mile Road
- 8 Mile—Eight Mile Road
- 9 Mile—Nine Mile Road
- 10 Mile—Ten Mile Road
- 11 Mile—Eleven Mile Road
- 12 Mile—Castor Road
- 13 Mile—Magrudder Road
- 14 Mile—Alamando Road
- 15 Mile—Geneva Road
- 16 Mile—Lewis Road
- 17 Mile—Coleman Road
- 18 Mile—County Line Road (Midland–Isabella county line)
