= Wismer Commons =

- Neighbourhood
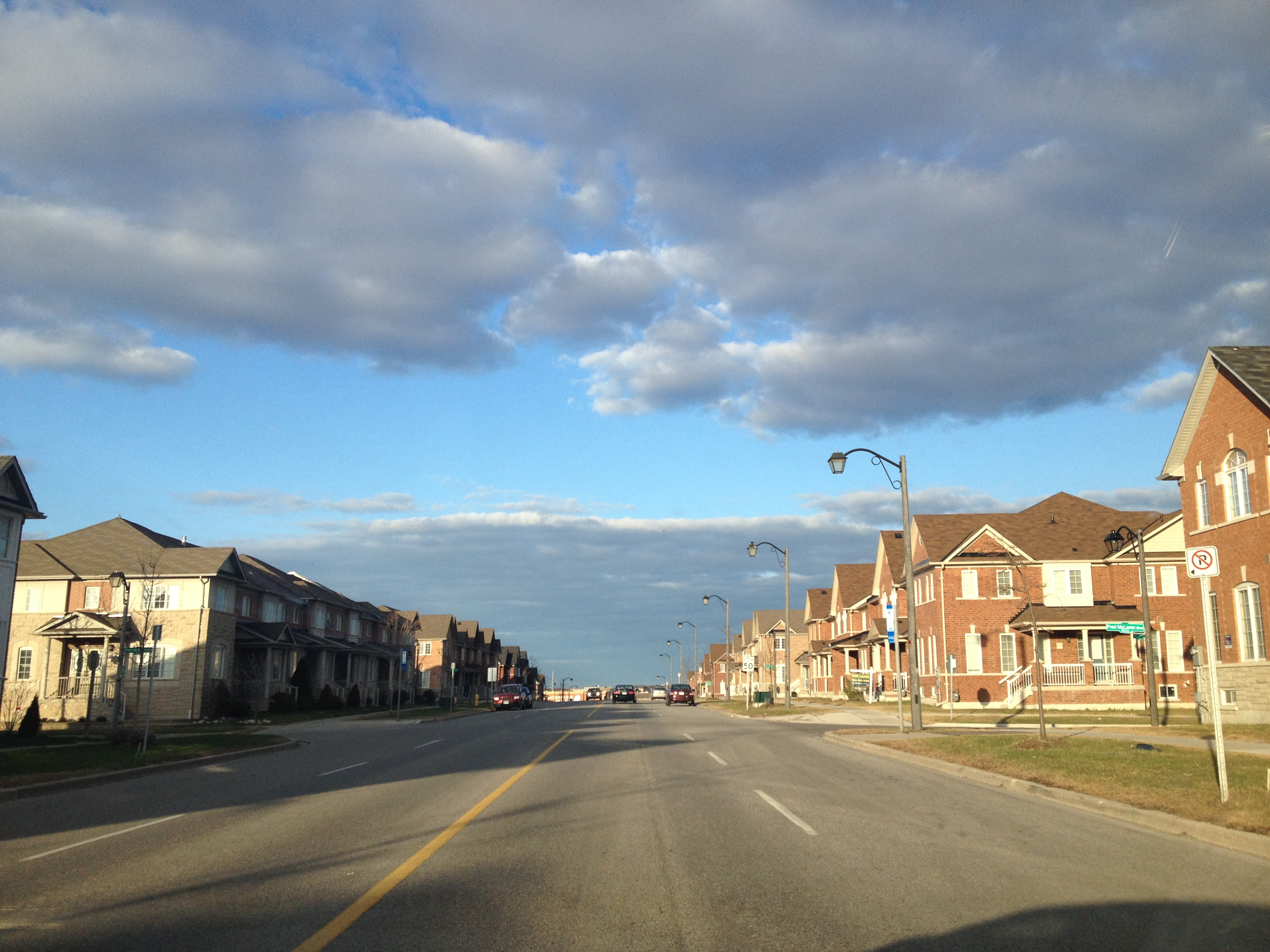
- Looking East on Bur Oak Avenue, by Fred McLaren Boulevard.
- Interactive map of Wismer Commons
- Coordinates: 43°53′37″N 79°16′40″W
- Country: Canada
- Province: Ontario
- Regional Municipality: York
- City: Markham
- Founded by: Wismer Family

Government
  - MP: Paul Chiang (Markham— Unionville)
  - MPP: Billy Pang (Markham—Unionville)
  - Councillor: Karen Rea (Ward 4)
- Postal codes: L6E

Wismer Commons is a residential area of Markham, Ontario, Canada, north of 16th Avenue, west of Markham Road and east of McCowan Road. Wismer Commons is named after the Wismer Family, one of the founding pioneer families of Markham, Ontario. The family of David Wismer, originally from Germany and subsequently Pennsylvania, arrived in Markham Township in 1806.

After the deaths of David and Lydia Wismer in 1856, the Wismer family continued to donate property to community organizations, including the land for the area's first school. This original one-room schoolhouse, near the south west corner of 16th Avenue and Markham Road was replaced around 1864 with a new school to the north near the present Markham Museum.

The name Wismer Commons can be found on stone plaques on both sides of the road at main arterial road entrances of developed regions of the community, such as the intersection of Bur Oak Avenue and McCowan Road.

== Future developments ==
Future developments will include construction of more: community schools, churches, plazas, public facility buildings (i.e. Emergency Services Stations), recreational facilities (i.e. Community Centres).

According to the Markham city planner, at Markham Road and Bur Oak Avenue, on the east edge of Wismer Commons, an area is reserved and proposed for a new shopping mall or plaza.
