= Ontario Cottage =

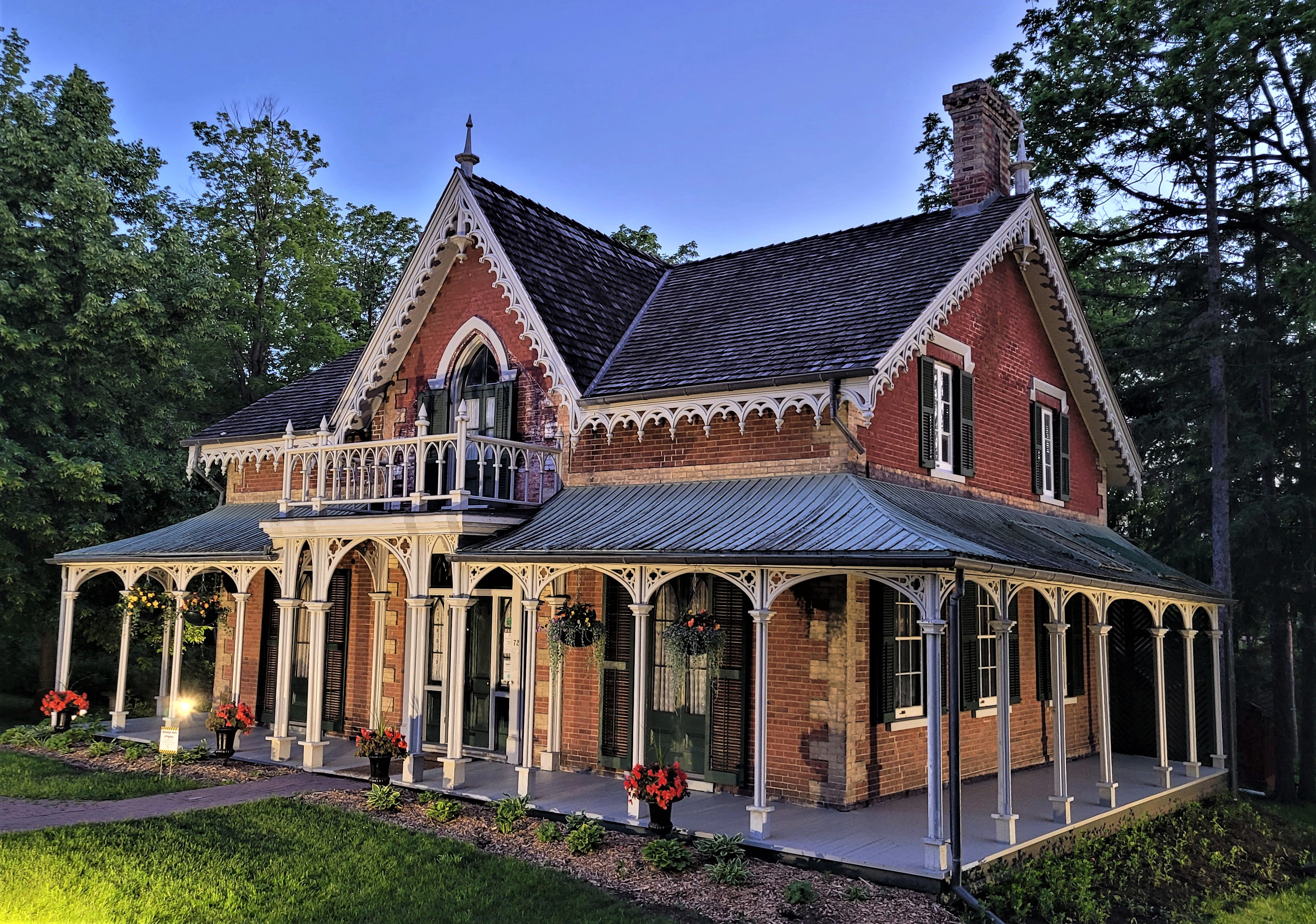
Hillary House and Koffler Museum of Medicine, Aurora, Ontario

The Ontario Cottage is a style of house that was commonly built in 19th century Ontario, Canada. The Ontario Cottage became popular in the 1820s and remained a common style until the end of that century. They were mainly built in rural and small town areas, less so in larger cities. This was the period in which European settlers first populated the interior of the province, and throughout it Ontario Cottages are some of the oldest houses.

An Ontario Cottage is essentially a regency-style structure, with symmetrical, rectangular plans. The style was efficient and easy to build for settlers with limited resources. The typical cottage had one-and-a-half storeys and large windows, made possible by relatively cheap mass-produced glass. The most distinctive feature of the Ontario Cottage was the single gable above the door in the centre of the building. By the second half of the 19th century Gothic had become the most popular architectural style in Canada. Many Ontario Cottages built during this era incorporate Gothic ornamentation, most often added to the gable.

== Gallery ==
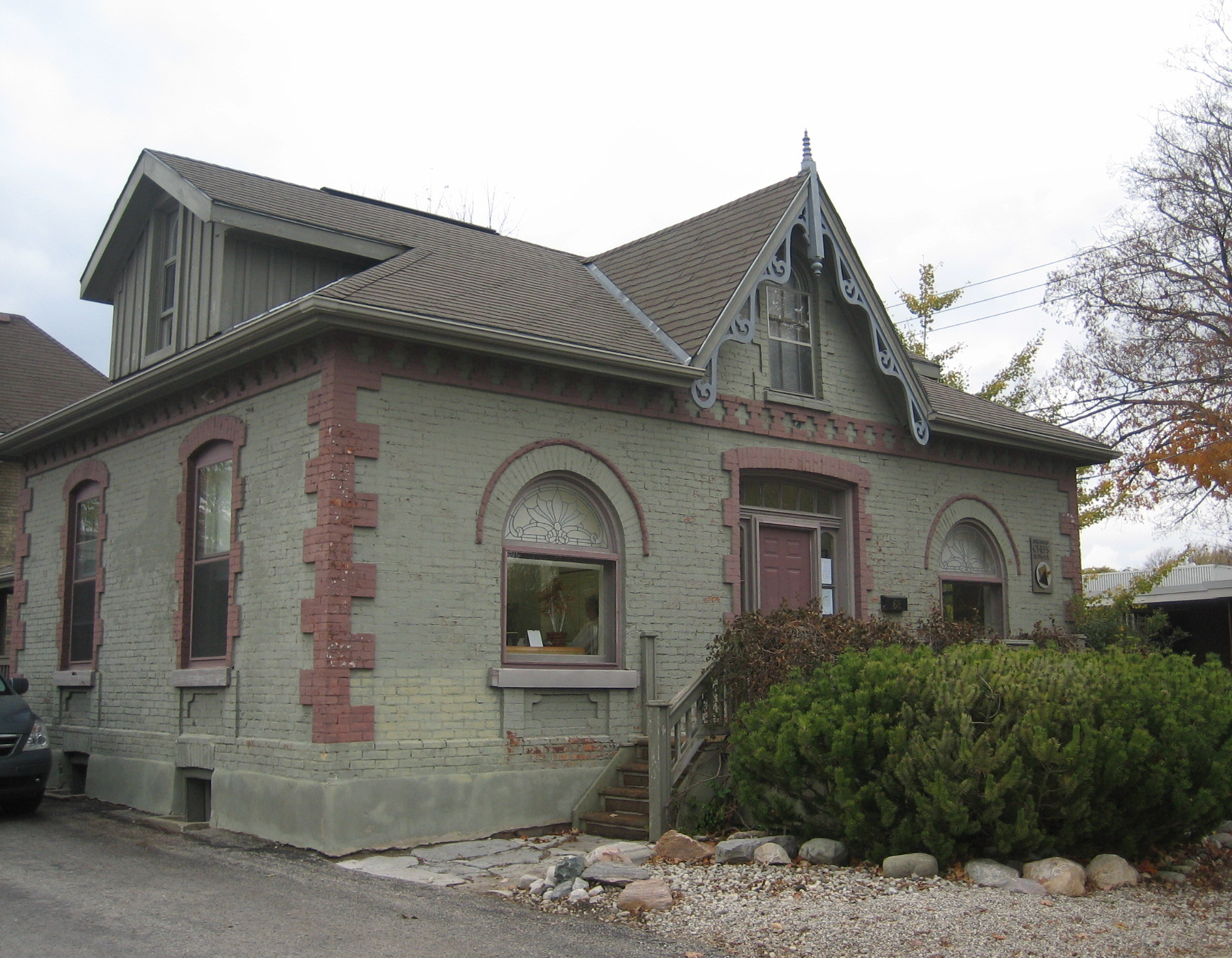
An Ontario cottage in Stratford, Ontario, a town known for its large collection of such structures

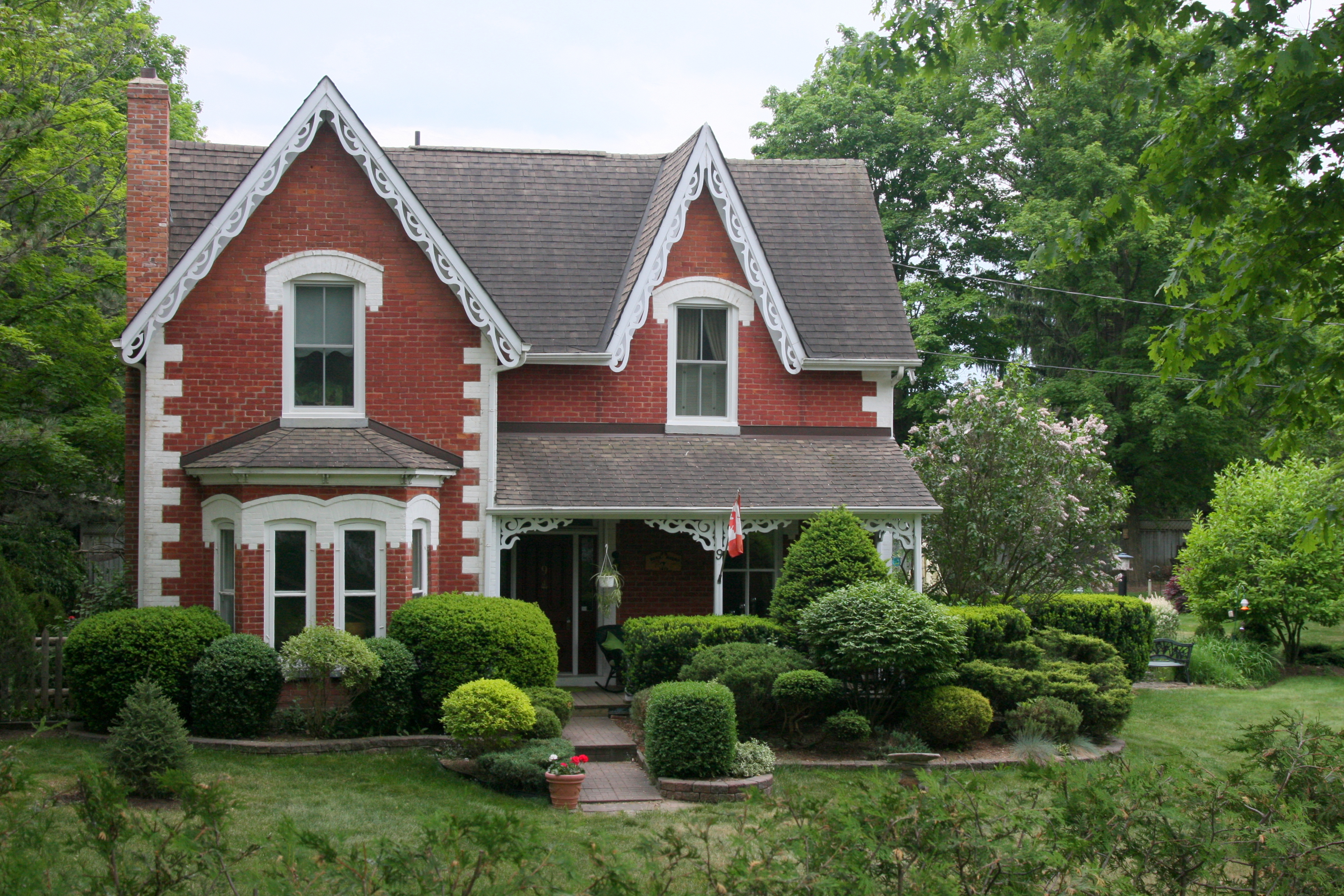
Norton House, Glen Williams, Ontario

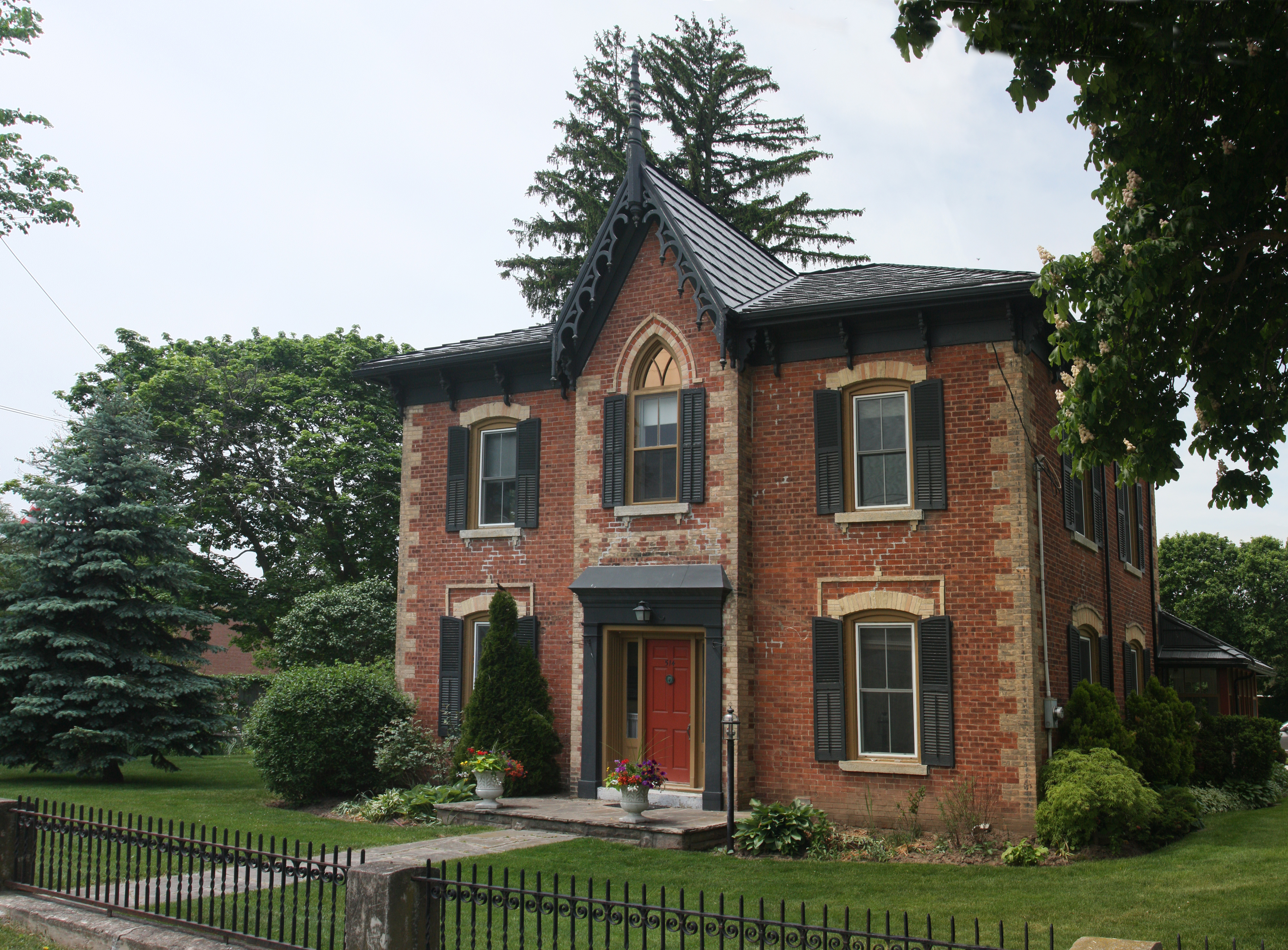
Charles Williams House, Glen Williams, Ontario

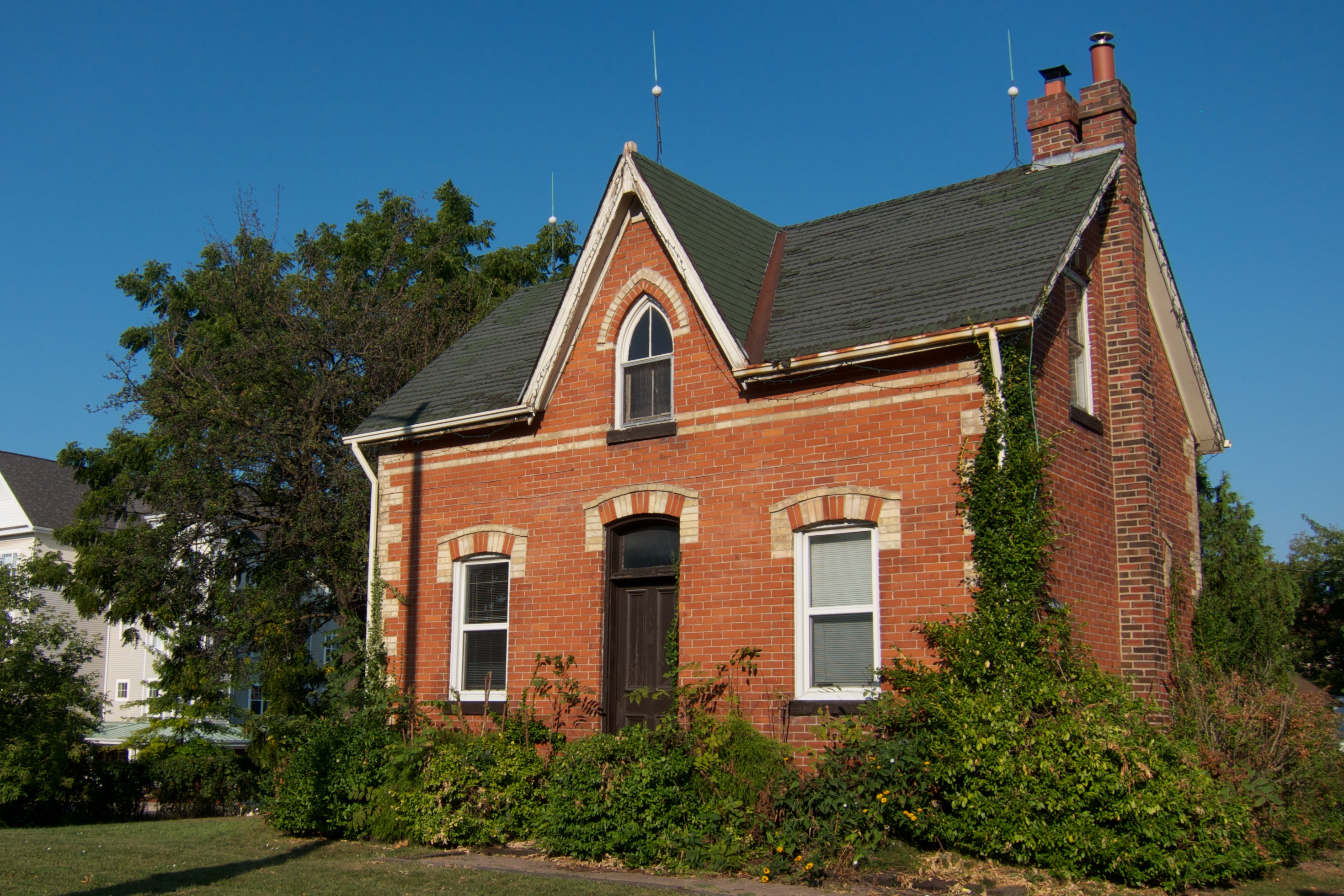
Moore-Stanfield House, Missisauga, Ontario
