= Wismann =

Wismann is a surname. Notable people with the surname include:

- Heinz Wismann (born 1935), Franco-German philologist and philosopher
- Pete Wismann (1922–2023), American football player

== See also ==
- Wisman, surname
