= Concession road =

Type of road in pre-Confederation Canada

In Upper and Lower Canada, concession roads were laid out by the colonial government through undeveloped Crown land to provide access to rows of newly surveyed lots intended for farming by new settlers. The land that comprised a row of lots that spanned the entire length of a new township was "conceded" by the Crown for this purpose (hence, a "concession of land"). Title to an unoccupied lot was awarded to an applicant in exchange for raising a house, performing roadwork and land clearance, and monetary payment. Concession roads and cross-cutting sidelines or sideroads were laid out in an orthogonal (rectangular or square) grid plan, often aligned so that concession roads ran (approximately) parallel to the north shore of Lake Ontario, or to the southern boundary line of a county.

Unlike previous American colonial practice, land in Ontario was surveyed first before being allocated to settlers.

The provision of road allowances was an advance over earlier survey systems which allocated no roadways. Waterloo township, for example, had no road allowances.

In some townships, the "line road" name (e.g., Ninth Line) was applied to the roads that elsewhere were called "concession roads", i.e., roads that ran between two adjacent concessions.

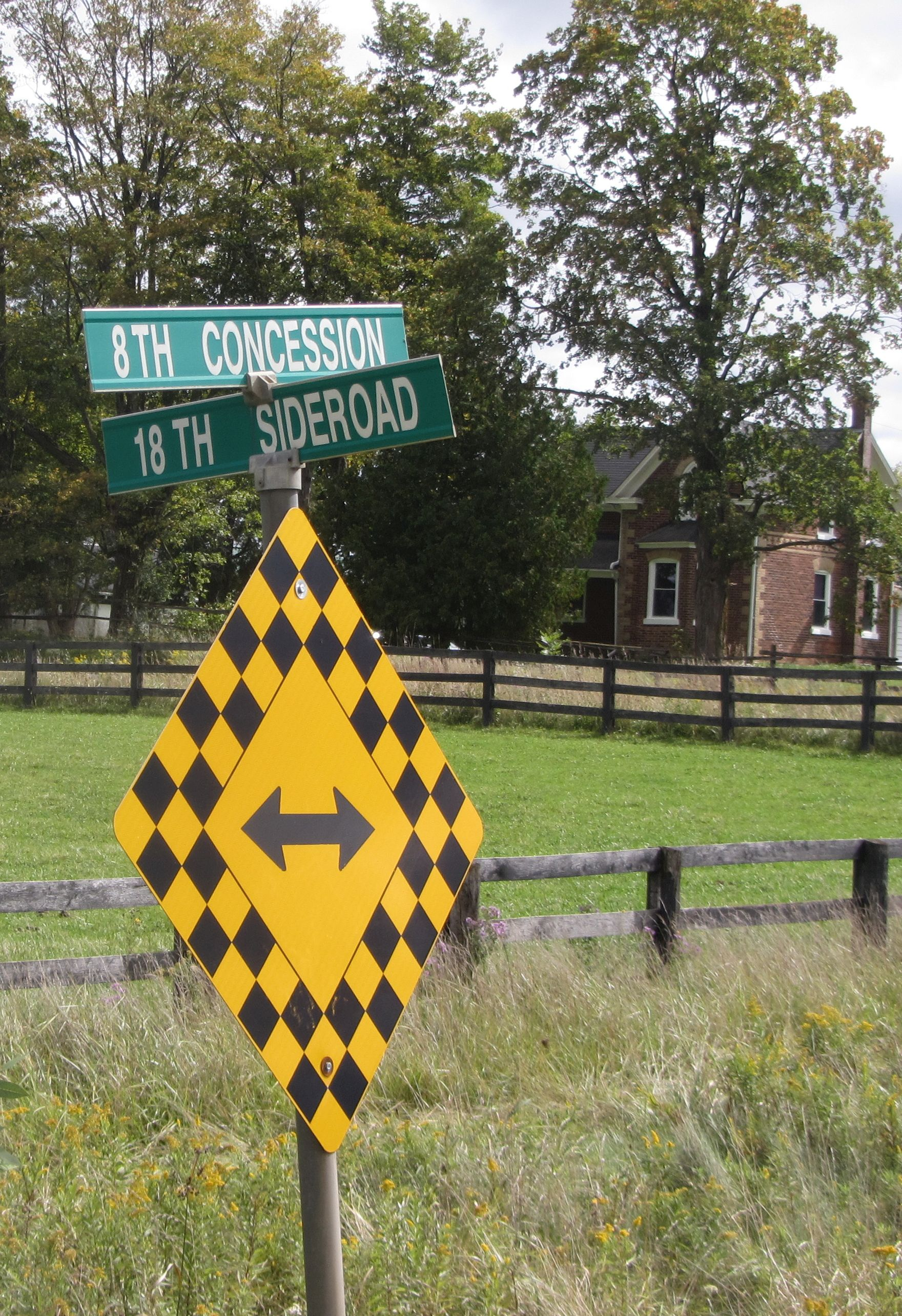
Corner of 8th Concession and 18th Sideroad, King Township, Ontario

== Survey systems ==
By one count, there were five major Ontario survey systems, with 166 variations, resulting in a "crazy quilt" of surveys. In many cases special colonization roads ran diagonally across the grid. Survey lines referenced back from the Great Lakes ran at different angles, forming triangles and other irregular shapes. Some townships had more than one survey. Holland, Nelson and Toronto Township (today Mississauga) are examples.

In a single-front survey, one of the earlier systems in use, lots were measured from one side of the concession to the other. Any errors in the survey became apparent at the road junctions, with the side roads being offset.Example Jogged Intersection in Single Front Township

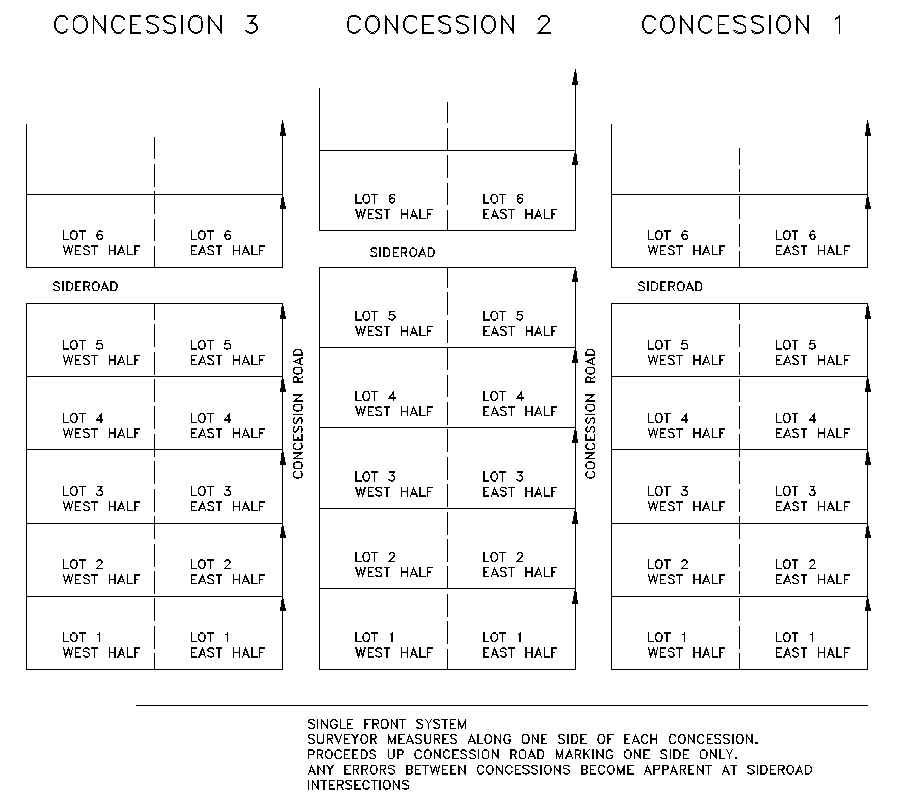
Single-front survey example (Ontario)

This was refined to a double-front system, where lots were measured from the front of the concession to a midpoint, and then from the back of the concession to the midpoint. This makes the road junctions even, but any errors result in jogs at the midpoint of the side road. Example Even-Intersection Jogged-Sideroad in Double Front Township

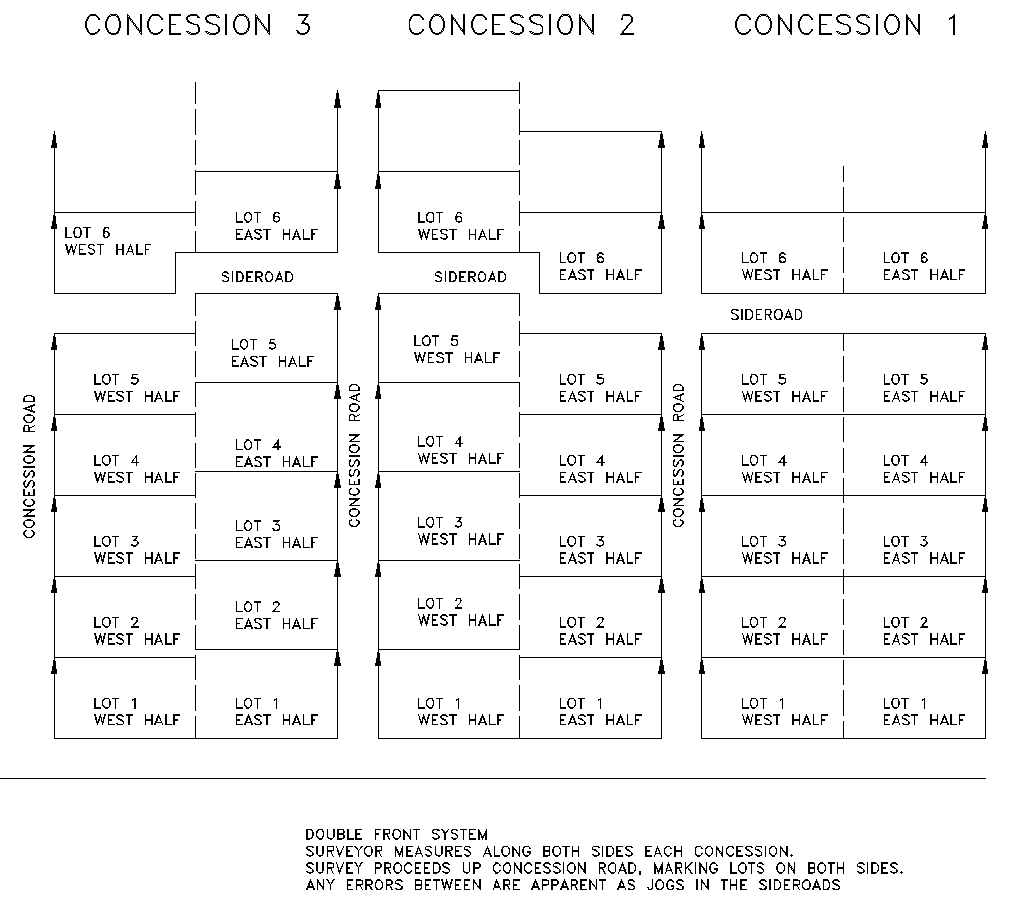
Double-front survey example (Ontario)

As townships were established further away from the St Lawrence, other systems developed. In a common square grid layout known as a 1,000-Acre Sectional System, adjacent parallel roads were 100 chains or 1 1/4 miles (2.0 km) apart, and arranged as ten 100-acre lots each 20 chains by 50 chains so that two consecutive concession roads and two consecutive side roads enclosed a square of 1,000 acres (4.0 km^{2}).

Another system used 100-acre lots each 30 by 33 1/3 chains, again arranged in 1000-acre blocks. Concession roads were 5/6 mile (1.3 km) apart, while sideroads were 1 7/8 miles (3.0 km) apart.

Other plans used during colonial surveying used different layouts and lot sizes of 100, 150, 160, 200 or 320 acres.

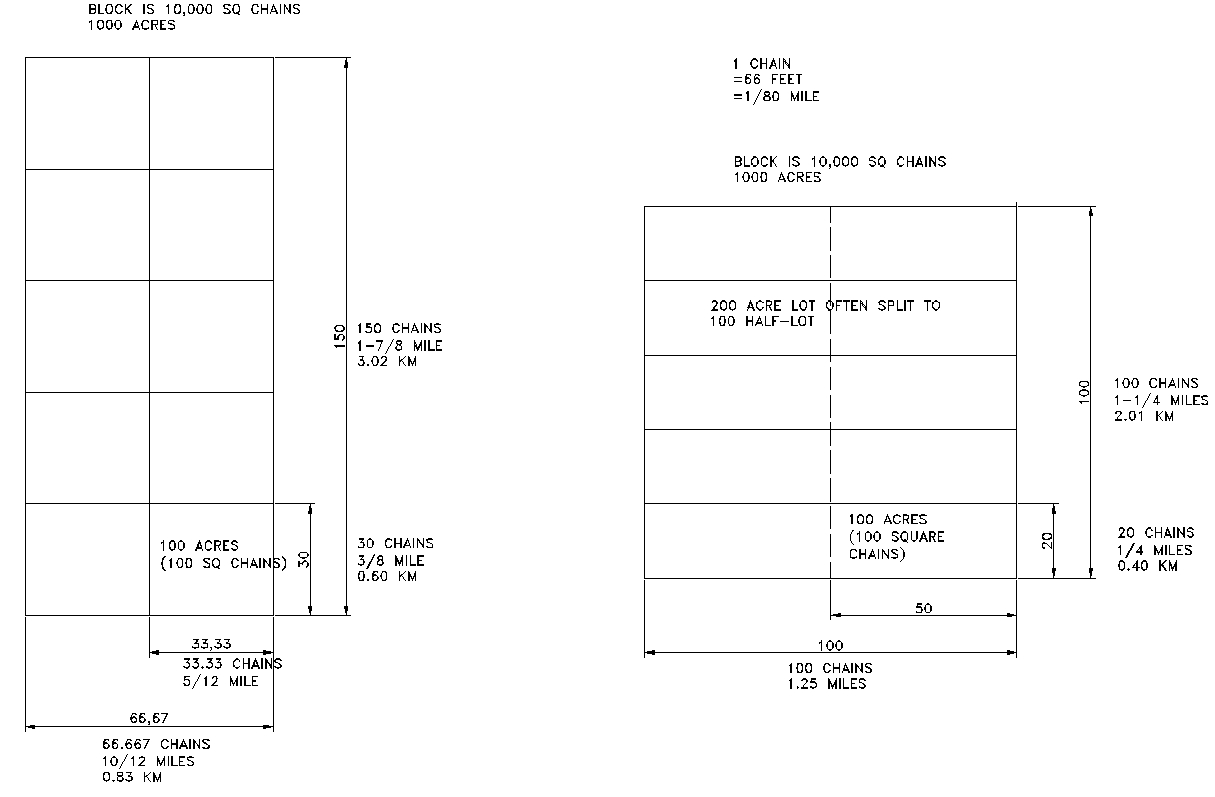
Sample survey size, Ontario Concession System

== Special terms ==
- Road allowance—a strip of land for provision of a public road between lots. Typically 66 feet wide or one chain.
- Unopened road allowance - is a public highway that has not been opened and assumed for maintenance purposes by-law of the township.
- Baseline—The first concession road in a township, was often called the baseline (from the surveying term), and roads so named remain in many municipalities, including Ottawa, Clarington and London.
- Front—the first concession road was also frequently called the front.
- Broken front—concession along a lake shore.
- Townline—a boundary line or road between two townships, e.g., Adjala-Tecumseth Townline. Note that townlines might be side roads.
- Given roads—special roads made to avoid natural obstacles that interfere with the grid.
- Gore—triangular shaped lots

== Concession road numbering ==
There is considerable variation in concession road nomenclature. Markham, for example, has both "Ninth Line" and "11th Concession Road".

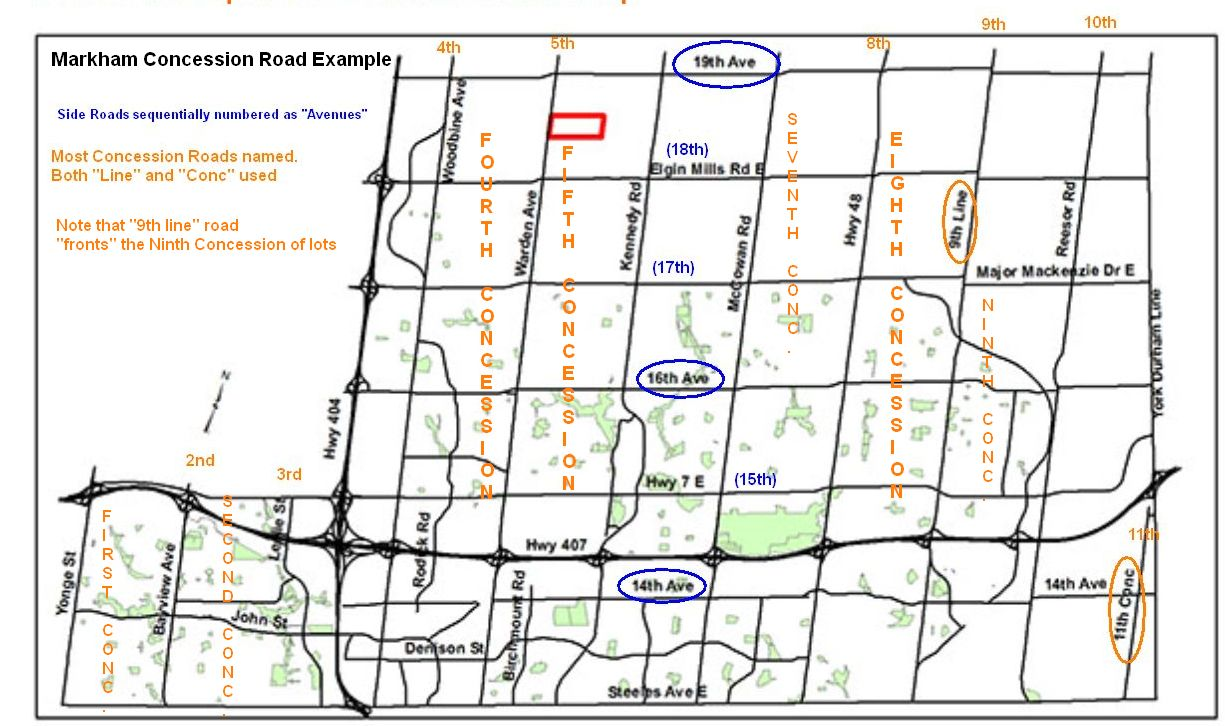

In some townships, numbering is sequential, starting from one side. For example, in King Township, concessions start from Yonge. Bathurst is the (former) Second Concession road, between concessions 1 and 2 (forms the front of the second concession of land). There is no "first" concession road.

In some townships, the baseline passed through the middle, with concessions numbered on each side.

- For example, in Peel Region and Dufferin County, Hurontario Street is the centre line, with concession line roads to either side being numbered East or West. In present-day Mississauga (which has two surveys – the 1,000-Acre Sectional and the 30 by 33 1/3 chain systems – divided by Eglinton Avenue) Kennedy Road is the former "First Line East" in the northern survey, and McLaughlin Road is the former "First Line West". The abbreviations "EHS" for "East of Hurontario Street" and "WHS" for "West of Hurontario Street" are used in Dufferin.
- In Warwick Township in Lambton County, the Egremont Road was the baseline, with successive concessions numbered either "North of the Egremont Road" ("NER") or "South of the Egremont Road" ("SER").

In some townships, such as those in Bruce County, each side of each successive concession road comprised a separate numbered concession. Thus, the south side of a road might be Concession 2 and the north side Concession 3. In this system, for the purposes of road signing only even (or, sometimes, odd) numbers were used, so that concession roads were successively numbered, e.g., 2, 4, 6, etc. This simplified the address numbering of farm lots, especially along township boundary roads where opposite sides of the same road were in different townships. Where even numbers were used, the numbers of odd-numbered concessions would appear only in property records (e.g., Lot 18, Concession 11, Brant Township, which would be on the north side of Concession Road 10).

Many concession roads retain their original names. Less developed areas are often referred to as "back concessions".

== Side road numbering ==
Side road or sideline numbering varies depending on the township. Some examples:

- Sequential—In King Township, sideroads were numbered consecutively. The last concession road was 13, so the first sideroad was 14, the next 15, and so on. Similarly, in Markham, 13th concession is proceeded by 14th Avenue (formerly 14th Side road).
- By adjacent lot number—Many townships in Bruce County, are numbered in multiples of 5, i.e., starting with the town line (road on township boundary), then numbered 5th, 10th, 15th, and so on, with five lots between each pair of successive sidelines in the original township survey. The side road number is tied to the adjacent lot number.

Many side roads are no longer numbered, but have been given names for the purposes of quicker locating by emergency services. For example, most of Renfrew County's side roads are given names such as Stokes Road, Patterson Road, Dillabough Road, Cheese Factory Road. The naming process has been underway for many years.

== Impact ==
In most of Upper Canada this layout of roads preceded urban development, so that most Ontario municipalities now have grid patterns of streets. In cities, many concession roads have become major streets. However, a few of the "sideline" roads in urban areas still retain their historic numbered lines or use "Line" for their street designations: Brown's Line, Ninth Line, and Guelph Line are important thoroughfares in Toronto and its western suburbs.

== See also ==
- Range road
- Dominion Land Survey
- County road
- Township road
- Mile Road System (Michigan)
