= Wisman =

Wisman is a surname. Notable people with the surname include:

- Henk Wisman (born 1957), Dutch football manager
- Thomas Wisman (born 1949), Australian-American basketball player and coach

== See also ==
- Wismann, surname
