= Wisner (surname) =

Wisner is a surname. Notable people with the surname include:

- Frank Wisner (1910–1965), American civil servant and father of Frank G. Wisner
- Frank G. Wisner (1938–2025), American diplomat and son of Frank Wisner
- Henry Wisner (c. 1720–1790), American politician
- Moses Wisner (1815–1863), American politician
- Quintrevion Wisner (born 2005), American football player
