= Wisner Township, Cuming County, Nebraska =

Wisner Township
- Township
- Location in Cuming County
- Coordinates: 41°57′40″N 096°57′45″W
- Country: United States
- State: Nebraska
- County: Cuming

Area
  - Total: 34.85 sq mi (90.25 km^{2})
  - Land: 34.27 sq mi (88.76 km^{2})
  - Water: 0.58 sq mi (1.49 km^{2}) 1.65%
- Elevation: 1,430 ft (436 m)

Population (2020)
  - Total: 138
  - Density: 4.03/sq mi (1.55/km^{2})
- GNIS feature ID: 0838336

Wisner Township is one of sixteen townships in Cuming County, Nebraska, United States. The population was 138 at the 2020 census. A 2021 estimate placed the township's population at 137.

== See also ==
- County government in Nebraska
