= Markham Museum =

Museum in Markham, Ontario, Canada

Coordinates: 43°53′38″N 79°15′56″W

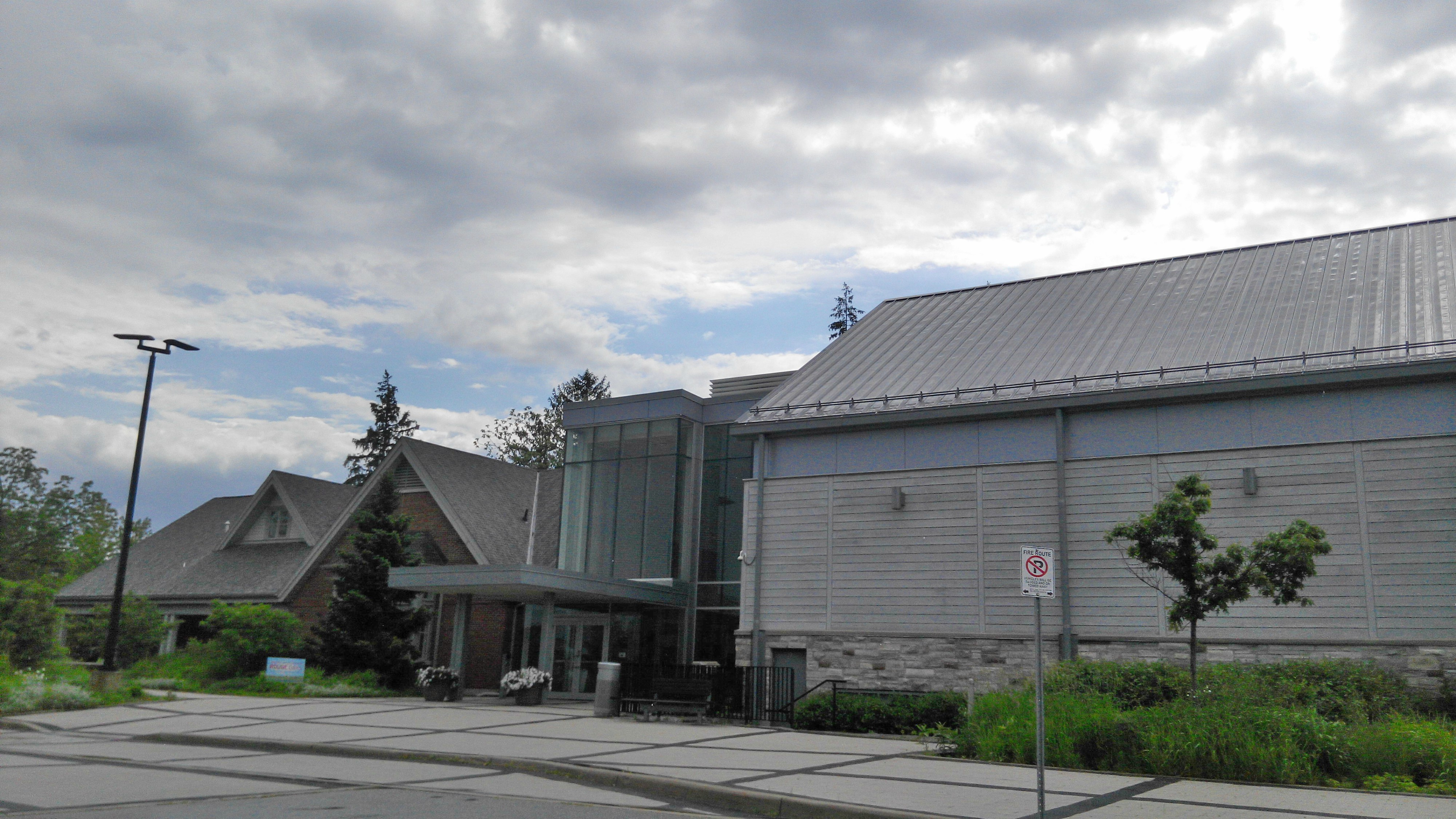
- Established: 1971
- Location: Markham, Ontario, Canada
- Website: www.markhammuseum.ca

Markham Museum (originally founded as The Markham District Historical Museum) is a 25-acre (10 ha) open-air museum located in Markham, Ontario, Canada. Opened in 1971 by the Markham District Historical Society with assistance from Markham-Unionville Lions Club and Town of Markham, the Museum used the former Mount Joy School and the surrounding 2 acres.

Over time, heritage structures from the area were moved to the Museum, adding to the 23 surrounding acres of farmland later purchased by the Town of Markham that were slated for redevelopment. In 2011, a new collections storage and exhibition hall opened to the public and in 2019 it was officially named as the John Lunau Centre.

Markham Museum comprises over 30 historic buildings, interactive exhibits, public and educational programs], and seasonal events like AppleFest and Scaryfest. The Museum has a goal of fostering community collaboration, offering programs and partnerships that bring people together to celebrate shared heritage and creativity. Regionally and nationally award-winning events and exhibitions mark the Museum's contribution to the community.

== Overview ==
Over 30 historic buildings and three interactive gallery spaces showcase the heritage of the community, combining historical stories and contemporary voices. Tours of the historic buildings take visitors through different eras of Markham's history, ranging from domestic dwellings to artisan workshops to commercial spaces.

The Christian K. Hoover House (c.1824) and the James Maxwell Log Cabin (c.1850) share the stories of local families through historical diorama while the Nathan Chapman Jr. House (c.1832) and the Burkholder House (c.1860) integrate exhibits and working studio space.

The Cedar Grove Blacksmith Shop (c.1862), the Print Shop, and the Burkholder House are working studio spaces, in which trained artisans provide live demonstrations during special events like AppleFest and ScaryFest and for specialized programming. The Sawmill and the Cider Mill are two of the Museum's agricultural spaces that showcase older technologies; the Cider Mill is used during AppleFest to produce fresh apple cider from local apples.

The Ninth Line Baptist Church (1848) is now a non-denominational building used for public programs, tours, and is available for venue rental. The Wilson Variety Hall (c.1875) was originally located in the heart of Markham Village and shares the story of a family retail business during the Victorian era. The Locust Hill Train Station (1936) was used by the Canadian Pacific Railway until 1969 and emphasizes the importance of transportation and commerce to the growth of hamlets and villages.

In addition to three modern and interactive gallery spaces and over 30 historic buildings, the Markham Museum hosts seasonal events and festivals, offers programming for all ages and interests, and is available for venue rental of its many spaces and grounds.
