= Cardinal Carter Catholic High School =

- Cardinal Carter (Ontario)

Location
- 210 Bloomington Road West; Aurora, Ontario, L4G 0P9; Canada; 43°57′44″N 79°27′56″W

Information
- School type: High school
- Motto: Pax et Lux
- Religious affiliation: Roman Catholic
- Founded: 1989; 37 years ago
- School board: York Catholic District School Board
- Superintendent: Rocchina Antunes
- Area trustee: Elizabeth Crowe
- School number: 728632
- Principal: Sabrina Bartolini
- Grades: 9-12
- Enrolment: 1,355 (2021-2022)
- Language: English
- Colours: Gold and Green
- Mascot: Celtic Leprechaun
- Website: cch.ycdsb.ca
- Last updated: April 2024

Cardinal Carter Catholic High School, often shortened to Cardinal Carter, is an International Baccalaureate high school in Aurora, Ontario, Canada in the York Catholic District School Board.

Cardinal Carter was established in 1989, commencing operation for grades eight and nine at Our Lady of the Annunciation elementary school. Once construction of the school was completed, service boundaries were defined by the school board to alleviate overcrowding of other Roman Catholic schools in the region, notably St. Robert and St. Elizabeth high schools in Thornhill, and Sacred Heart Catholic High School in Newmarket. It takes its name after Cardinal Gerald Emmett Carter, former archbishop of Toronto. It is also sometimes confused with Cardinal Carter Academy for the Arts.

== Notable alumni ==
- Dakota Goyo, actor
- James Tuck, Canadian football player

== See also ==
- Education in Ontario
- List of secondary schools in Ontario
