= Bressani =

Bressani is a surname. Notable people with the name include:

- François-Joseph Bressani SJ (1612–1672), Italian-born Jesuit priest and missionary
- Gregorio Bressani (1703–1771), Italian philosopher
- Lorenzo Bressani (born 1973), Italian sailor
- Piergiorgio Bressani (1929–2022), Italian politician
- Ricardo Bressani (1926–2015), Guatemalan food scientist

== See also ==
- Bressani Award
- Father Bressani Catholic High School in Woodbridge, Ontario, Canada
