= Tim Jacobs =

Tim Jacobs may refer to:

- Tim Jacobs (ice hockey)
- Tim Jacobs (American football)
