= St. Jean de Brebeuf Catholic High School =

Location
- 2 Davos Road; Vaughan, Ontario; Canada; 43°50′3″N 79°33′33″W

Information
- School type: Catholic High School
- Motto: Eruditio mentis animae nutrimen (Educating the mind, nurturing the soul)
- Religious affiliation: Roman Catholic
- Founded: 2005
- School board: York Catholic District School Board
- Superintendent: Jennifer Sarna
- Area trustee: Maria Marchese
- Principal: Elisa Mastromartino
- Grades: 9-12
- Enrolment: 1,590 (2023-2024)
- Language: English
- Colours: Black and Yellow
- Mascot: Buddy the Black Bear
- Team name: Black Bears
- Website: sjdbh.ycdsb.ca

St. Jean de Brebeuf Catholic High School, also known as SJDB or SJB, is a Catholic high school located in Vaughan, Ontario, Canada. Opened in September 2005 to about 600 students, it has since grown to just over 1500 enrolled students. The school started with only grades 9 and 10 in the first year it opened. SJB is part of the York Catholic District School Board (YCDSB). St. Jean de Brebeuf has six computer labs, two full size gyms, two full size grass soccer fields, a running track, tennis courts, and a baseball diamond. It has an agreement with the Vellore Village Community Center, which is directly connected to the school, granting students patronage of the full size swimming pool, gym and youth room.

In June 2026, the school's Robotics Club completed a student-led project named Bear Force One, launching a weather balloon into the stratosphere. Reaching an altitude of over 30,000 metres, the balloon's payload captured video footage of the Earth's curvature and trained an onboard artificial intelligence model during the flight, becoming the first high school to do atmospheric AI training. The AI model is now publicly available to download or use as a chatbot at sjdb-ai.vercel.app.

== Feeder schools ==
The feeder schools for St. Jean de Brebeuf are:

- St. Emily Catholic School
- St. Agnes of Assisi Catholic School
- St. Veronica Catholic School
- St. John Bosco Catholic School
- St. Clare Catholic School
- St. Michael the Archangel Catholic School
- St. Mary of the Angels Catholic School
- Guardian Angles Catholic School

=== Dual Feeder schools ===
Students in at the following schools have the option to attend Holy Cross, Father Bressani, or St. Jean De Brebeuf.

- St. Andrew Catholic School
- St. Stephen Catholic School
- St. Padre Pio Catholic School
- Our Lady of Fatima Catholic School

== Notable Alumni ==
- Typical Gamer, Canadian YouTuber
- Luka Gavran, Canadian soccer goalie

== See also ==
- Education in Ontario
- List of secondary schools in Ontario
