= St. Maximillian Kolbe Catholic High School =

St. Maximilian Kolbe Catholic High School
- St. Maximillian Kolbe (Ontario)

Location
- 278 Wellington St. East; Aurora, Ontario, L4G 1J5; Canada; 44.00337°N 79.45414°W

Information
- School type: High school
- Motto: Choice, Not Chance, Determines Destiny
- Religious affiliation: Roman Catholic
- Founded: 2009
- School board: York Catholic District School Board
- Superintendent: Joel Chiutsi
- Area trustee: Elizabeth Crowe
- Principal: Michelle Miranda
- Grades: 9-12
- Enrolment: 1297 (October 2023)
- Language: English
- Colours: Gold and Blue
- Team name: Mustangs
- Website: smkh.ycdsb.ca

St. Maximillian Kolbe Catholic High School is a high school in Aurora, Ontario, Canada. The school opened in September 2009, and is administered by the York Catholic District School Board. St. Maximilian Kolbe CHS's patron saint is Saint Maximilian Kolbe, a Franciscan priest from Poland that was incarcerated and executed at the Auschwitz concentration camp as a political prisoner during World War II.

When the school opened in September 2009, there were less than 800 students in grades 9 and 10. In the 2010/2011 school year, St. Max had students in grades 9, 10, and 11. By the following school year, the school was teaching curriculum for grades 9 to 12 and graduated its first senior class in June 2012. The following June, St. Max graduated its first class of students that attended the institution from grades 9 to 12.

The school crest, logo, colour scheme, and mascot were chosen and during the 2008/2009 school year, before the school's completion.

The school currently offers French Immersion, Advanced Placement (AP), and High Performance Athlete (HPA) programs as of February 2025.

== See also ==
- Education in Ontario
- List of secondary schools in Ontario
