= Father Michael McGivney Catholic Academy =

Coordinates: 43°51′3″N 79°16′47″W

Location
- 5300 14th Avenue; Markham, Ontario, L3S 3K8; Canada

Information
- School type: High school
- Motto: All things in Christ
- Religious affiliation: Roman Catholic
- Founded: 1992
- School board: York Catholic District School Board
- Superintendent: Jennifer Sarna
- Area trustee: Frank S.D Alexander
- School number: 706809
- Principal: Camille Robinson
- Grades: 9-12
- Enrolment: 1123
- Language: English
- Colours: Black, Blue, White
- Mascot: Wizard
- Team name: Magic
- Website: fmmh.ycdsb.ca
- Last updated: December 2021

Father Michael McGivney Catholic Academy (commonly known as FMM) is a Catholic high school of the York Catholic District School Board. It is located at the intersection of 14th Avenue and McCowan Road in the city of Markham, Ontario. The school was founded by the York Catholic District School Board in 1989 and is named in honour of Father Michael J. McGivney, founder of the Knights of Columbus. The school is authorized as an International Baccalaureate World School. The school officially opened to students in September 1992.

Students have the option of being enrolled in the International Baccalaureate program as of January 2011. This program is designed as an academically challenging and balanced program that prepares students for success in their post-secondary education and beyond. In the IB program, students study six courses at higher or standard level. Students must choose one subject from each of groups 1 to 5 (to gain experience in languages, social studies, the experimental sciences and mathematics). Moreover, the sixth subject may be an arts subject chosen from group 6 or another subject from groups 1 to 5.

The school has an enrolment of 1400 students ranging from grade 9 to 12.

== Facilities & productions ==
Facilities in FMM include:

- Main and attendance office
- Guidance office
- Chaplancy office
- Organic Greenhouse
- Visual art rooms
- Cafeteria
- Classrooms
- Communication/new media lab
- Building and construction shop
- Design & technological lab
- Dance studio
- Stage (in cafeteria)
- Three gymnasiums
- Music rooms
- Lecture hall (rehabilitated in 2015–2016)
- Co-op room
- Special Education aka FLS or Best Buddies room
- Tuck shop
- Drama room
- Dome (opened 3 October 2015)
- Resource center
- Science labs
- Staff room
- Staff workrooms
- Student government office
- Student and guest parking facilities
- Washrooms for students
- Portables for ESL Adult classes
- Gymnasium change room with shower and washroom
- Weight room
- Yearbook office

Father Michael McGivney has had numerous productions for their drama classes, such as the Grade 11 production of The Big Bad in January 2011 adapted from the story of The Big Bad Wolf. In 2012 that class produced the first musical in over 4 years at the school, "You're A Good Man Charlie Brown" performed with live music. The school also has other numerous arts events, including the Grade 12 Art Exhibition at McKay House Gallery in Unionville. They had another show later that year to exhibit more photography and design work at the Unionville Station. They also host Annual Arts Night held at the school where they exhibit work by all the grades, have drama showcases, band performances and in 2012 the addition of the school's newly founded choir.

== Feeder schools ==
- Sir Richard W. Scott Catholic School
- St. Benedict Catholic School
- St. Francis Xavier Catholic School

== 2003 SARS lockdown ==
In 2003, the entire school was quarantined and closed due to a case of the SARS virus.

== Notable alumni ==
- Phylicia George (class of 2005), track and field athlete who competed in the 2016 Rio Olympics. Also won a bronze medal Winter Olympics at Pyeongchang 2018, in bobsleigh
- Andrew "Burd" Liburd (class of 2004), JUNO nominated music producer for Meek Mill, MGK, Pusha T, Joe Budden and others
- Jordan Romano (class of 2011), pitcher for the Toronto Blue Jays
- Mike Zigomanis (class of 2000), former professional hockey player who played for the Carolina Hurricanes, Phoenix Coyotes, St. Louis Blues, Pittsburgh Penguins, and Toronto Maple Leafs

== See also ==
- Education in Ontario
- List of secondary schools in Ontario
