= James Tuck (Canadian football) =

Canadian gridiron football player (born 1990)

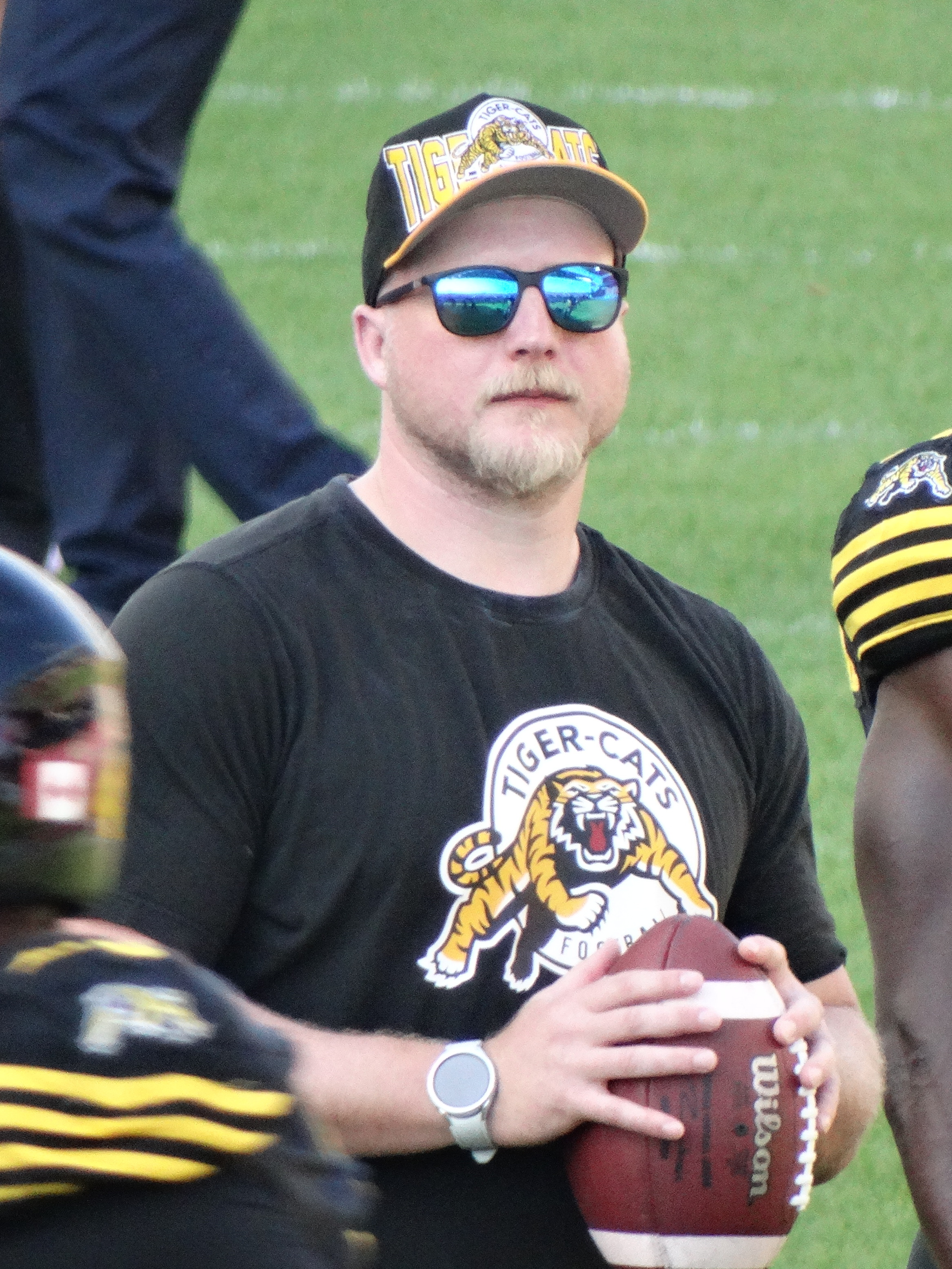
- Tuck with the Hamilton Tiger-Cats in 2025

Hamilton Tiger-Cats
- Title: Running backs coach

Personal information
- Born: June 12, 1990 (age 36); Aurora, Ontario, Canada
- Listed height: 6 ft 0 in (1.83 m)
- Listed weight: 230 lb (104 kg)

Career information
- Position: Fullback (No. 40)
- High school: Cardinal (Aurora)
- OVFL: Newmarket Storm
- University: York
- CFL draft: 2014: 4th round, 31st overall pick

Career history

Playing
- 2014–2016: Montreal Alouettes
- 2016: Winnipeg Blue Bombers
- 2017: Toronto Argonauts
- 2017–2021: Edmonton Eskimos / Elks
- 2022: Saskatchewan Roughriders
- 2023: Montreal Alouettes
- 2024: Hamilton Tiger-Cats

Coaching
- 2025–present: Hamilton Tiger-Cats (Running backs coach, Assistant special teams coach)

Awards and highlights
- Grey Cup champion (2023)

Career CFL statistics
- Games played: 123
- ST tackles: 66
- Receptions: 30
- Receiving yards: 261
- Stats at CFL.ca

James Tuck (born June 12, 1990) is a Canadian former professional football fullback who is the running backs coach for the Hamilton Tiger-Cats of the Canadian Football League (CFL). He played in ten seasons for six different teams and won a Grey Cup championship with the Montreal Alouettes in 2023. He played CIS football for the York Lions. Tuck also played junior football for the Newmarket Storm of the Ontario Varsity Football League.

== Early life ==
Tuck played hockey at Cardinal Carter Catholic High School in Aurora, Ontario. He played hockey in the Aurora Minor Hockey Association and York Simcoe Express triple-A programs growing up. He did not play football in high school as Cardinal Carter Catholic was a non-football school. Tuck first played football for the Newmarket Storm of the Ontario Varsity Football League, where he played for two seasons.

== University career ==
Tuck played for the York Lions of York University from 2010 to 2013. He was a linebacker his first two seasons before switching to defensive end for his last two years. He played in seven games for the team during his freshman year in 2010, recording 24.5 tackles and one pass breakup. Tuck appeared in three games for the Lions in 2011, totaling 9.5 tackles and one forced fumble. He started eight games for the team in 2012, accumulating 33 total tackles, 6.5 sacks, and one forced fumble. He won the Nobby Wirkowski Defensive MVP Trophy as the Lions' most valuable defensive player and played in the 2013 East West Bowl. Tuck started eight games his senior season in 2013, recording 41.5 tackles, 4.5 sacks, two pass breakups, one forced fumble and one fumble recovery. He again earned the Nobby Wirkowski Defensive MVP Trophy in 2013. He was in the Business and Society program at York.

== Professional career ==
=== Pre-draft ===
Tuck earned an invite to the CFL's National Combine after participating in the Toronto regional combine.

=== Montreal Alouettes (first stint) ===
Tuck was selected by the Montreal Alouettes in the fourth round with the 31st pick in the 2014 CFL draft. He played in nine games for the Alouettes as a linebacker in 2014, totaling five special teams tackles. He also recorded four special teams tackles in two playoff games. Tuck played in five games for the team during the 2015 season, spending time at defensive end and fullback. He signed a one-year contract with the Alouettes on February 5, 2016. He was released by the Alouettes on July 2, 2016. He played in one game for the Alouettes in 2016.

=== Winnipeg Blue Bombers ===
Tuck was signed by the Winnipeg Blue Bombers on July 4, 2016. He was placed on the injured list on August 2 and was activated on August 25, 2016. He played in 14 games for the Blue Bombers in 2016.

=== Toronto Argonauts ===
In February 2017, he signed with the Toronto Argonauts. He was demoted to the practice squad on July 22 and was released by the Argonauts on August 21, 2017. He played in four games for the Argonauts in 2017, recording four special teams tackles.

Tuck with the Montreal Alouettes in 2023

=== Edmonton Eskimos / Elks ===
Tuck signed with the Edmonton Eskimos on August 30, 2017. He was released by the Eskimos on September 8 and re-signed on September 12, 2017. In seven games with Edmonton, Tuck recorded an impressive 16 tackles on special teams, as well as one forced fumble. He added another forced fumble during the playoffs; his performance in 2017 lead to his contract being extended for 2018. However, during April minicamp, Tuck was lost for the season to a ruptured Achilles tendon. Tuck returned to form in 2019, making 15 special teams tackles and forcing a fumble. He also received his first professional touch, a carry for five yards in Edmonton's season finale, which was Tuck's 58th game. He signed a contract extension through the 2021 season on January 11, 2021.

In the first game of the 2021 season, he recorded his first career reception on August 7, 2021, against the Ottawa Redblacks on the last play of the game where he fell one yard short of a game-winning touchdown. He played in all 14 regular season games in 2021 where he had one defensive tackle, four special teams tackles, and four receptions for 45 yards. However, he was released on December 28, 2021.

=== Saskatchewan Roughriders ===
On January 7, 2022, it was announced that Tuck had signed with the Saskatchewan Roughriders. He played in 15 regular season games where he had four catches for 38 yards and three special teams tackles. He became a free agent upon the expiry of his contract on February 14, 2023.

=== Montreal Alouettes (second stint) ===
On February 14, 2023, it was announced that Tuck had signed with the Alouettes. He played in all 18 regular season games where he had nine receptions for 57 yards. He became a free agent upon the expiry of his contract on February 13, 2024.

=== Hamilton Tiger-Cats ===
On February 13, 2024, Tuck signed with the Hamilton Tiger-Cats. He played in all 18 regular season games where he had a career-high 14 catches for 121 yards along with 13 special teams tackles. His contract expired on February 11, 2025.

== Coaching career ==
On March 18, 2025, it was announced that Tuck had joined the coaching staff for the Hamilton Tiger-Cats where he was named the team's running backs coach and assistant special teams coach.
