= St. Luke Catholic Learning Centre =

Location
- 160 Dudley Avenue; Thornhill, Ontario, L3T 2E6; Canada; 43°48′34″N 79°25′13″W

Information
- School type: High school
- Religious affiliation: Roman Catholic
- School board: York Catholic District School Board
- Superintendent: Joel Chiutsi
- Area trustee: Board of Trustees
- School number: 905-832-4773
- Principal: Christian Scenna
- Grades: 9-12
- Enrolment: 43 (2020)
- Language: English
- Website: stluke.ycdsb.ca

St. Luke Catholic Learning Centre is a high school in Thornhill, Ontario, Canada. It is administered by the York Catholic District School Board.

== See also ==
- Education in Ontario
- List of secondary schools in Ontario
