= St. Theresa of Lisieux Catholic High School =

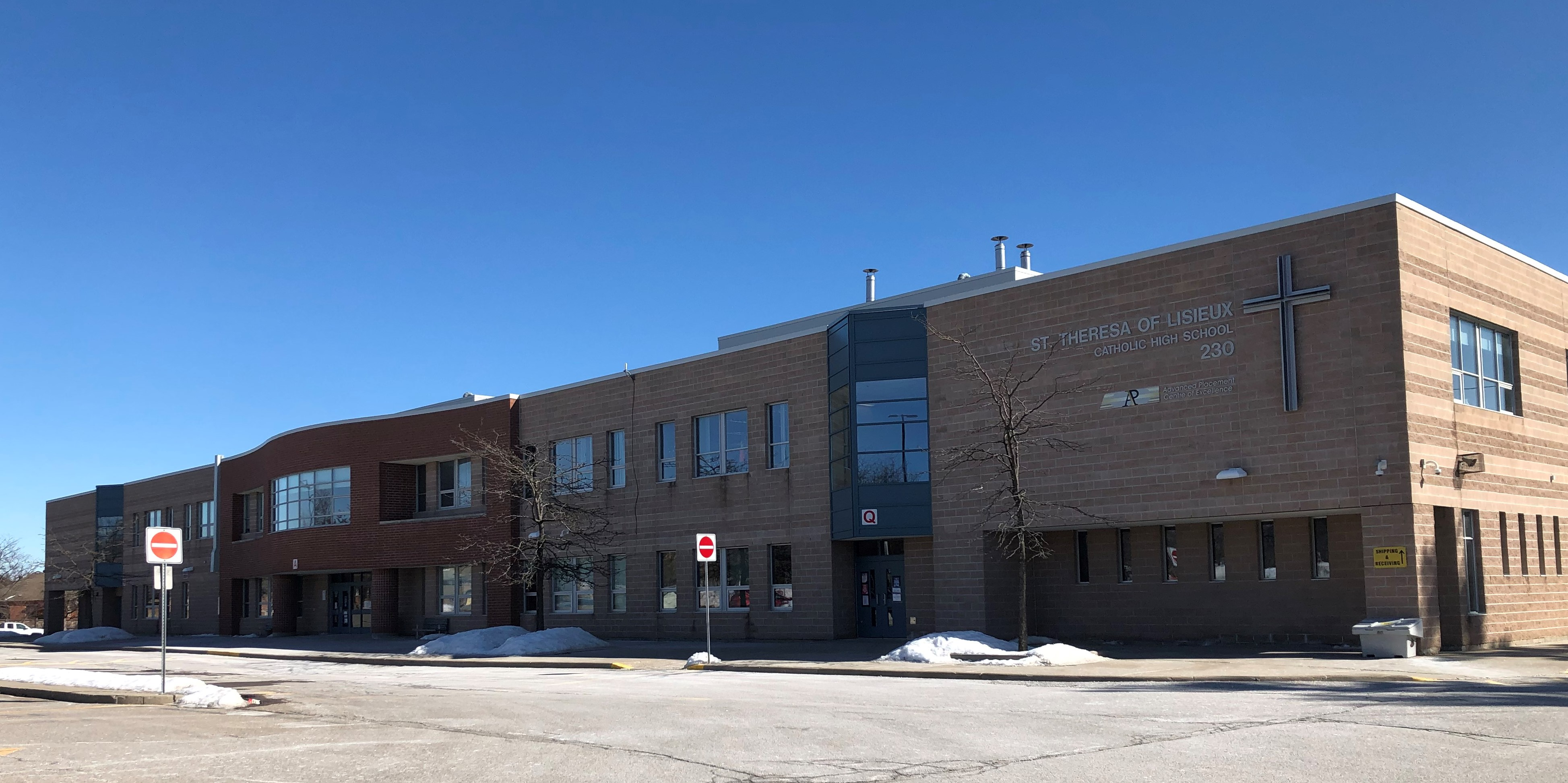

Location
- 230 Shaftsbury Avenue; Richmond Hill, Ontario, L4C 0E8; Canada; 43°53′41″N 79°27′56″W

Information
- School type: High school
- Motto: Parva tamen magna cum caritate age (Latin for "Do ordinary things with extraordinary love")
- Religious affiliation: Catholic
- Patron saint: Thérèse of Lisieux
- Founded: 2002; 24 years ago
- School board: York Catholic District School Board
- Superintendent: Joel Chiutsi
- Area trustee: Joseph Dimeo, Maria Iafrate
- Principal: Peter Parente
- Grades: 9–12
- Enrolment: 1,592 (2023)
- Language: English
- Campus: 15 acres
- Colours: Black, White, Green, Gold
- Mascot: Roary the Lion
- Team name: The Lions
- Website: stlh.ycdsb.ca

St. Theresa of Lisieux Catholic High School is a high school in Richmond Hill, Ontario. The school is named after 19th-century French Discalced Carmelite Thérèse of Lisieux. The school was founded by the York Catholic District School Board in 2002. The first graduating class was that of 2005; the graduating class of 2006 was the first class to have gone through all four grades at this school.

The school team is named The Lions, with the mascot being Roary the Lion. St. Theresa's athletics offers a wide variety of sports and other recreational events held throughout the school year.

St. Theresa of Lisieux Catholic High School also offers the AP (Advanced Placement) and pre-AP program to students. Students in this regular program have the opportunity to participate in differentiated courses in English, Mathematics, Science, and Social Sciences. In addition, the school offers Specialist High Skills Major (SHSM) programs to its students.

== Academics ==
As of November 2026, St. Theresa of Lisieux ranks 1st in Ontario out of 747 high schools according to the Fraser Institute, tied with four other schools. The school also ranks 1st out of 8 high schools in Richmond Hill.

== Elementary feeder schools ==
"Feeder schools" refer to elementary schools from around the area that provide automatic enrolment in the high school.

- Father Henri J.M. Nouwen Catholic Elementary School
- St. Anne Catholic Elementary School
- St. Charles Garnier Catholic Elementary School
- St. Marguerite d'Youville Catholic Elementary School
- St. Mary Immaculate Catholic Elementary School

== See also ==
- Education in Ontario
- List of secondary schools in Ontario
