= Our Lady of the Lake Catholic Academy =

Location
- 185 Glenwoods Avenue; Keswick, Ontario, L4P 2W6; Canada; 44°12′45″N 79°27′38″W

Information
- School type: High school Middle school
- Motto: "My soul proclaims the greatness of the Lord."
- Religious affiliation: Roman Catholic
- Founded: 2001
- School board: York Catholic District School Board
- Superintendent: Joel Chiutsi
- Area trustee: Theresa NcNicol
- School number: 748528
- Principal: Theresa Romeo
- Grades: 7-12
- Enrolment: 996 (2020)
- Language: English
- Colours: Navy Blue and White
- Mascot: Bulldogs
- Website: ollh.ycdsb.ca

Our Lady of the Lake Catholic Academy (O.L.L.) is a high school in Keswick, Ontario, Canada in the York Catholic District School Board.

The high school's philosophy and unique inclusion of grades 7 and 8 were cited by Principal Mike Nasello in a Toronto Sun interview explaining the school's jump from a 4.8 to a 7.9 rating in the Fraser Institute's rating between 2002 and 2007. Over 90% of first-time writers of the province's literary test passed in 2007 compared with 67.1% in 2002.

== Notable alumni ==
- Sean Walker, (2012) professional ice hockey player

== See also ==
- Education in Ontario
- List of secondary schools in Ontario
