= St. Augustine Catholic High School, Ontario =

St. Augustine Catholic High School
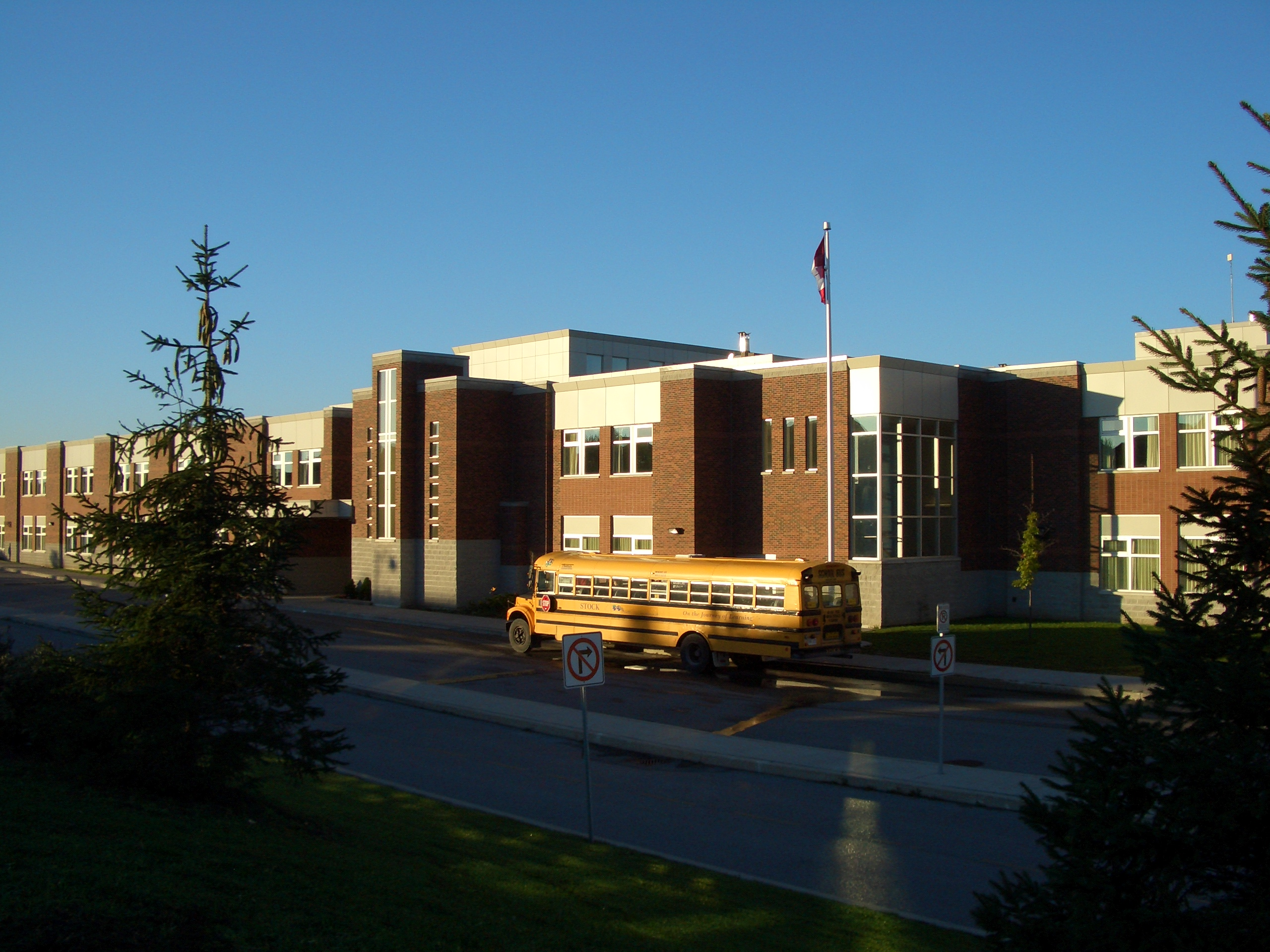

Location
- 2188 Rodick Road; Markham, Ontario, L6C 1S3; Canada; 43°52′31″N 79°21′28″W

Information
- School type: High school
- Motto: Caritas Veritas Unitas (Charity, Truth, Unity)
- Religious affiliation: Catholic
- Founded: 2001
- School board: York Catholic District School Board
- Superintendent: Jennifer Sarna
- Area trustee: Carol Cotton
- School number: 765708
- Principal: Danny Dilallo
- Grades: 9–12
- Enrolment: 1705 (September 2025)
- Language: English
- Colours: Maroon, Gold, White, Blue
- Team name: Titans
- Website: stau.ycdsb.ca staugustinechs.ca

St. Augustine Catholic High School (/ɔːˈɡʌstɪn/) is a high school in Markham, Ontario, Canada. It is a technologically-oriented school, is part of the York Catholic District School Board, and opened in 2001. As of September 2025, it had an enrolment of 1705 students and 92 faculty members. In the Fraser Institute's Report Card on Ontario’s Secondary Schools 2025, the school was ranked 6th out of 746 secondary schools in Ontario with an overall rating of 9.6 out of 10.

St. Augustine CHS offers many different opportunities that set it apart from other high schools in Ontario, featuring programs like a Specialist High Skills Major (SHSM) program and the STREAM Focus program. The St. Augustine CHS STREAM Focus program is an inter-disciplinary approach to inquiry and problem-based learning. It incorporates real-world challenges and the engineering design process to foster critical thinking, creativity, collaboration, and communication skills guided by the traditional principles of Catholic social teachings.

== Curriculum ==
Following the Ontario curriculum like other Catholic high schools in the York Catholic District School Board, studies at St. Augustine CHS include: mathematics, English language studies, modern language studies, Canadian and world studies, technology, visual arts, musical studies, religion, business, and the sciences.

== Elementary feeder schools ==
The term "feeder schools" refers to the elementary schools from around the area that provide automatic enrolment in the high school.

- All Saints Catholic Elementary School
- St. Justin Martyr Catholic Elementary School
- St. Monica Catholic Elementary School
- Blessed John XXIII Catholic Elementary School
- St. Matthew Catholic Elementary School

== See also ==
- Education in Ontario
- List of secondary schools in Ontario

== Gallery ==
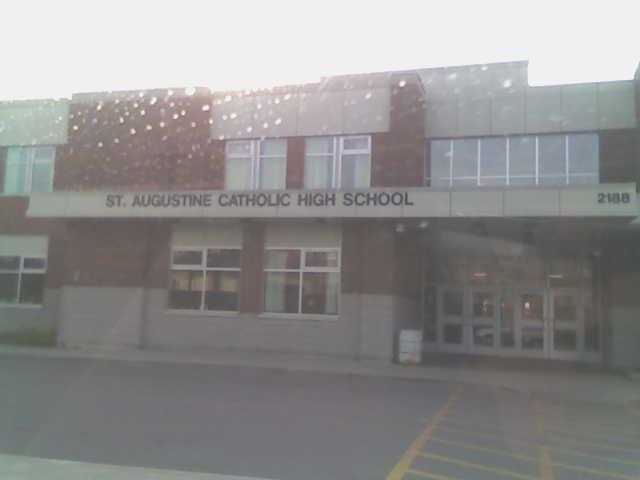
Taken near the front door of the school, November 2006.

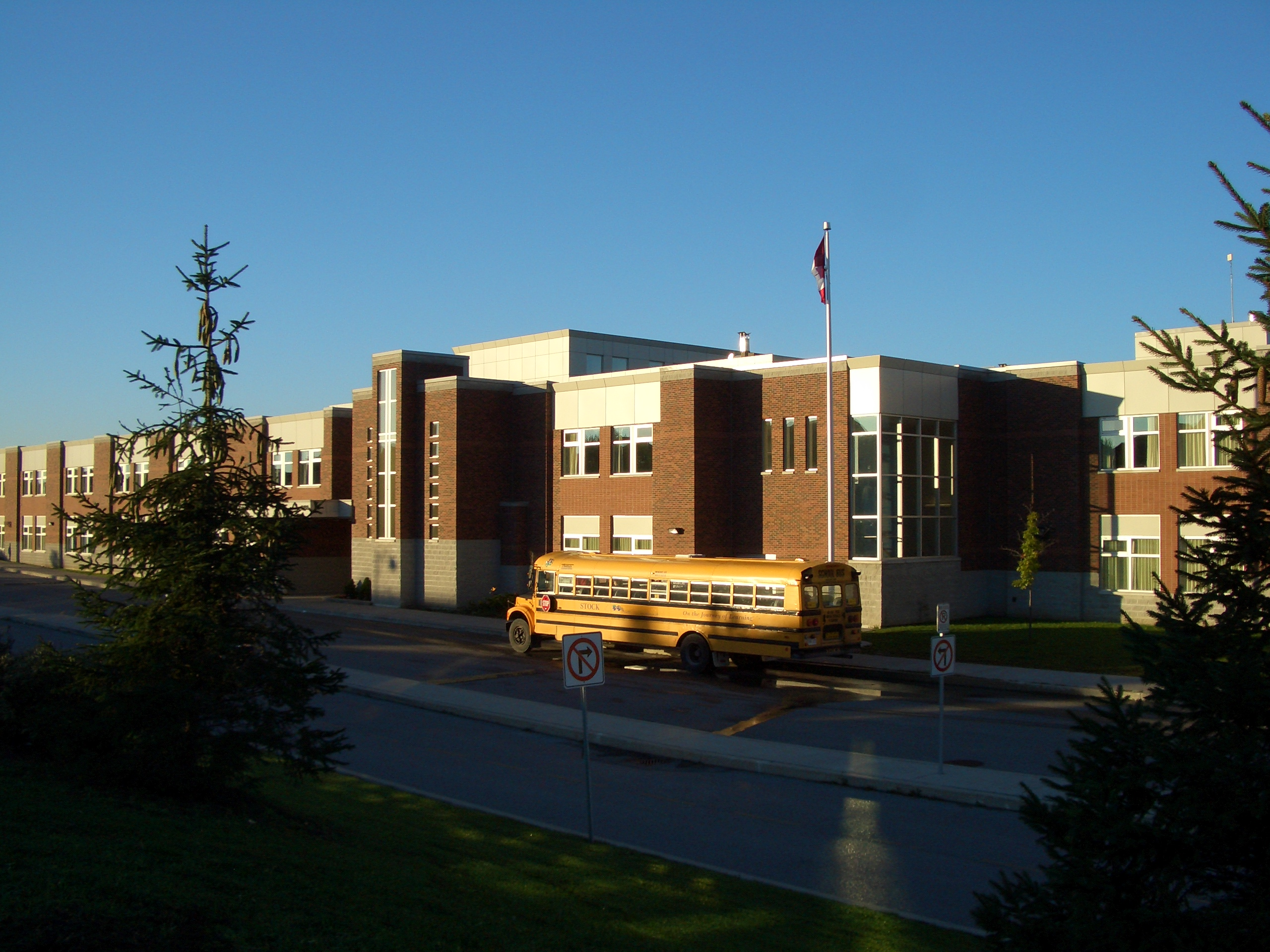
An overall picture of the school taken near Rodick Road Parking Lot Entrance
