= Keswick, Ontario =

Community in Ontario, Canada

Keswick
- Unincorporated community
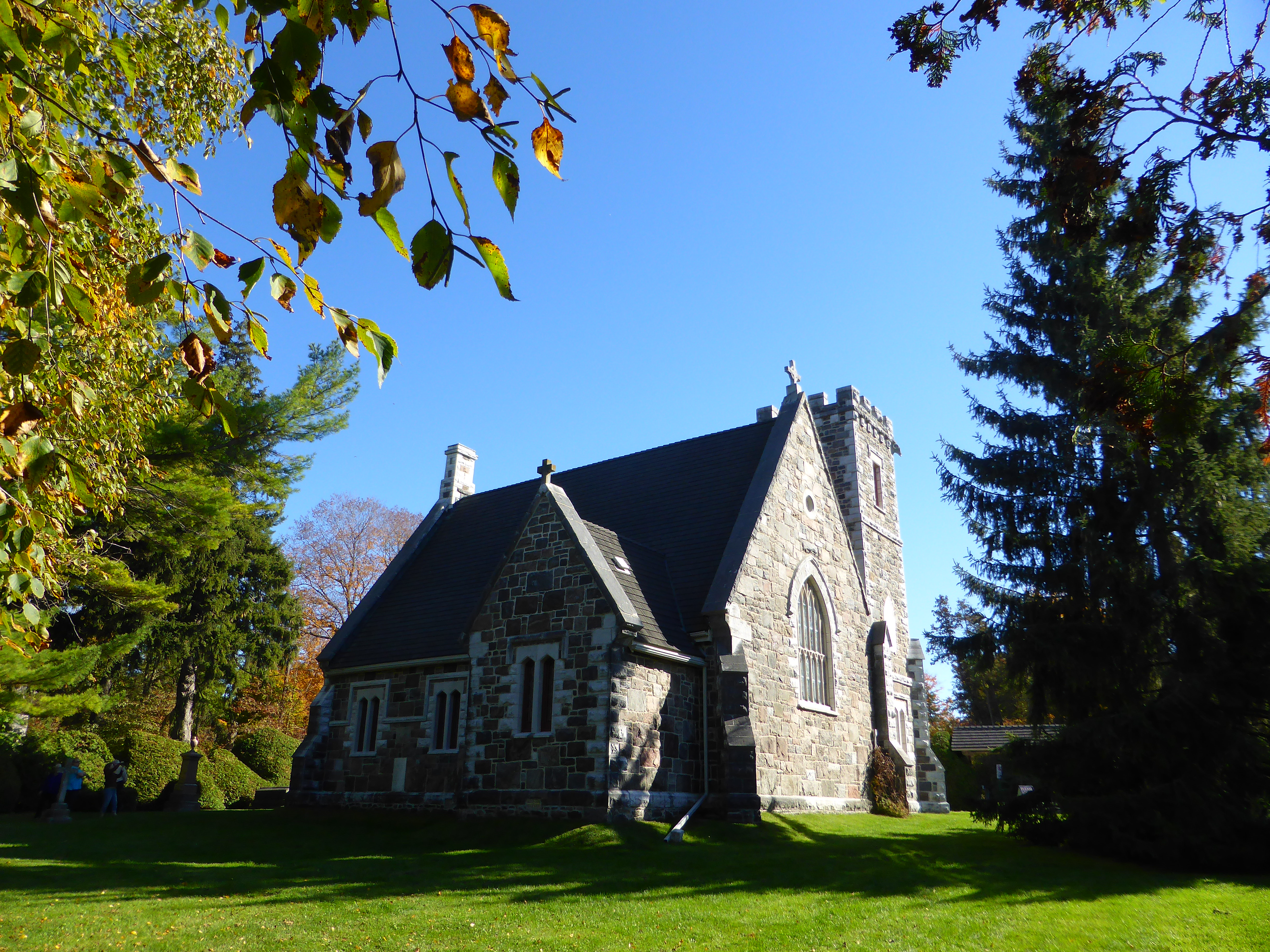
- Nickname: The 'Wick
- Location within Southern Ontario
- Coordinates: 44°14′37″N 79°28′33″W
- Country: Canada
- Province: Ontario
- Region: York
- Municipality: Georgina

Area
  - Land: 16.25 km^{2} (6.27 sq mi)

Population (2016)
  - Total: 26,757
  - Density: 1,647/km^{2} (4,270/sq mi)
- Time zone: UTC-5 (EST)
  - Summer (DST): UTC-4 (EDT)
- Forward sortation area: L4P
- Area codes: 905 and 289
- NTS Map: 31D3 Newmarket
- GNBC Code: FEEFR

Keswick (/ˈkɛzwɪk/) is a community located in the Canadian province of Ontario. It is located 72km (45mi) from Downtown Toronto and is the northernmost municipality inside of York Region. Situated on Lake Simcoe, there are boat ramps and water access points in the area. As of the 2016 Census, the municipal population of Keswick was 26,757, however growth rates have increased in recent years due to relatively low housing costs, especially when comparing rates across the GTHA. The cost of living is 14% less than the provincial average.

Roches Point (44°16′19″N 79°29′59″W) is a small residential community on the shore of Lake Simcoe in Keswick.

== History ==
Keswick was originally known as Medina, founded by Chris Armstrong. It was a part of the Township of North Gwillimbury before becoming part of the Township of Georgina. It may have been renamed after Keswick, Cumbria in England. The area was formerly considered part of "cottage country" for those who lived in Toronto up until the late 1980s, when major development further opened up access to Keswick, expanding its population.

Since the completion of the extension of Highway 404 into the region, the Simcoe Landing community has resumed construction. In 2017 the development started construction on Phase 9 overtop of existing farmers fields. The completed community will span from Ravenshoe Rd to Glenwoods Ave, The Queensway South to Woodbine Ave. Future plans indicate an additional elementary and secondary school to be located in this area as well as parks and green space.

Roches Point was named after the Irish settler James O'Dell Roch, who obtained land in the area sometime before 1812 and sold it after being forced to retreat during the War of 1812. It became Government Reserves by 1822, and the name disappeared within the new community of Keswick, beginning in 1824. After the War of 1812 the Roches Point area was considered as a possible alternative capital to replace York (now Toronto), as it was farther from American encroachment.

== Geography ==
Keswick's geographical coordinates are 44.22°N, 79.45°W, and its elevation above sea level is 221m/762 ft. It has a geographical area of 16.25 km^{2} according to Statistics Canada. It is bound on the north by Roches Point, the east by Woodbine Avenue, the south by East Gwillimbury (Ravenshoe Road) and the west by Cook's Bay, part of Lake Simcoe. Included in Keswick is the Keswick Marsh, part of the Holland Marsh. Having been built mainly as a cottage community, Keswick is fairly long north-to-south as it hugs the shore of Lake Simcoe. The Maskinonge River weaves through Keswick, across both of its main streets, The Queensway South and Woodbine Avenue.

== Demographics ==
Historical population
Year	Pop.	±%
1991	Unknown	—
2001	Unknown	—
2006	24,502	—
2011	26,002	+6.1%
2016	26,757	+2.9%

According to the Canada 2016 Census conducted by Statistics Canada:

- Population: 26,757
- Population % Change (2011–2016): 2.9%
- Dwellings: 9,918
- Area (km².): 16.25
- Density (persons per km².): 1647.0

Specific demographics for Keswick are not available, since it is counted as part of Georgina.

== Economy ==
The town boasts a number of shopping areas and attractions along the lakeshore and nearby agricultural areas. The majority of residents commute south to Newmarket or Toronto to work as there are no major employers in Keswick. The majority of businesses in Keswick are retail in nature, the largest is Walmart which opened in 2010.

== Arts and culture ==
The Stephen Leacock Theatre, opened in 1985, presents performances ranging from musicals and plays to orchestras and band performances.

- Elm Hurst Beach Association (who, amongst other things, spearheaded a drive to clean up part of Lake Simcoe)
- Kinsmen Club of Keswick - a division of Kin Canada which was established in 1976.
- The Georgina Arts Centre and Gallery, established near the end of the twentieth century and displays over 500 original paintings and photographs donated by various Canadian Artists.
- Georgina Pioneer Village and Archives, opened in 1975 by the Chief of the Chippewas of Georgina Island, is a 10-acre site home to numerous buildings that represent the history of Georgina between 1850 and 1920. The site includes a schoolhouse, a general store, a train station, a blacksmith shop, an apothecary and a backwoods log house.
- The Link, located in Sutton, is a former school the Town of Georgina is re-purposing into a community hub that brings together many partners, including the Georgina Chamber of Commerce and Tourism Information Centre, Hospice Georgina, Georgina Trades Training Inc., and Georgina Community Food Pantry. The Link offers programs geared towards health and wellness, arts and culture, youth engagement, recreation, and job training.
- Music in the Streets is a music festival, hosted by Connors Music, a local music store, celebrating talent from around Georgina.

== Attractions ==
The Georgina Military Museum is located at the north end of Keswick. The town has become a popular destination in Ontario for swimming, boating, ice fishing, and snowmobiling. Georgina offers a number of year-round activities including many public parks, beaches, forested areas, conservation areas such as the Morning Glory Provincial Nature Reserve, Sibbald Point Provincial Park, and the Keswick Marsh Fish and Bird Sanctuary. The ROC, located in Georgina is an all season outdoor adventure park that features activities such as tubing, snowboarding and skiing in the winter and soccer, volleyball and bike trails in the summer. Lake Simcoe, located north of the city of Toronto, is a 3580 km^{2} lake boarding on the Town of Georgina. Lake Simcoe is part of the Trent Severn Waterway which acts as the connection between Lake Ontario to Georgian Bay in Lake Huron. With 52 km of shoreline, lake activities include boating, swimming and fishing.

== Sports ==
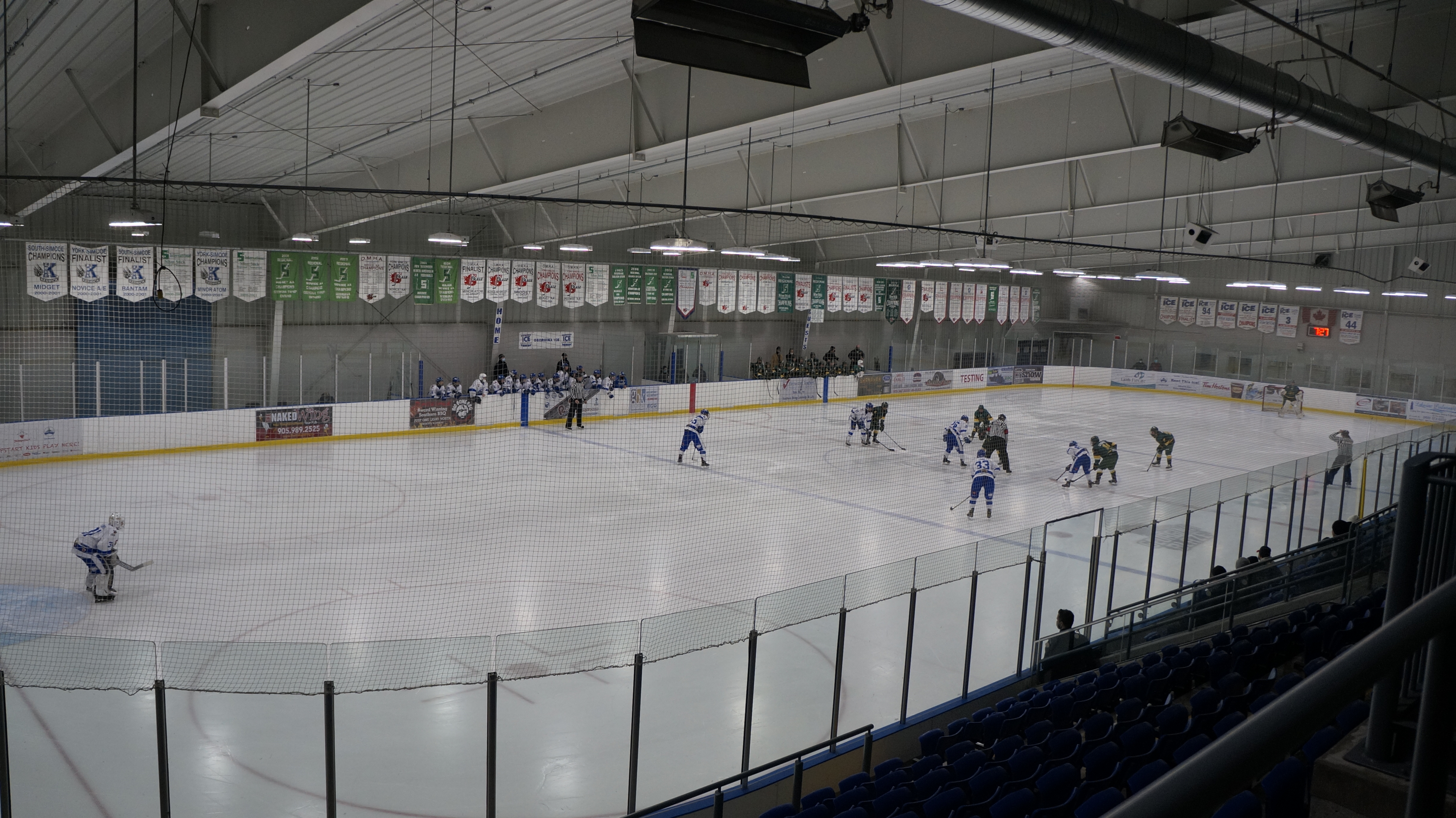
Georgina Ice Palace

Keswick houses the Georgina Ice Palace where the Georgina Blaze hockey team, Georgina Girls Hockey Association and Georgina Skating Club are headquartered. The Georgina Ice Palace is a combination library/skating rink with a skate park outside. The two ice pads can seat almost 1,500 people between them.

== Infrastructure ==
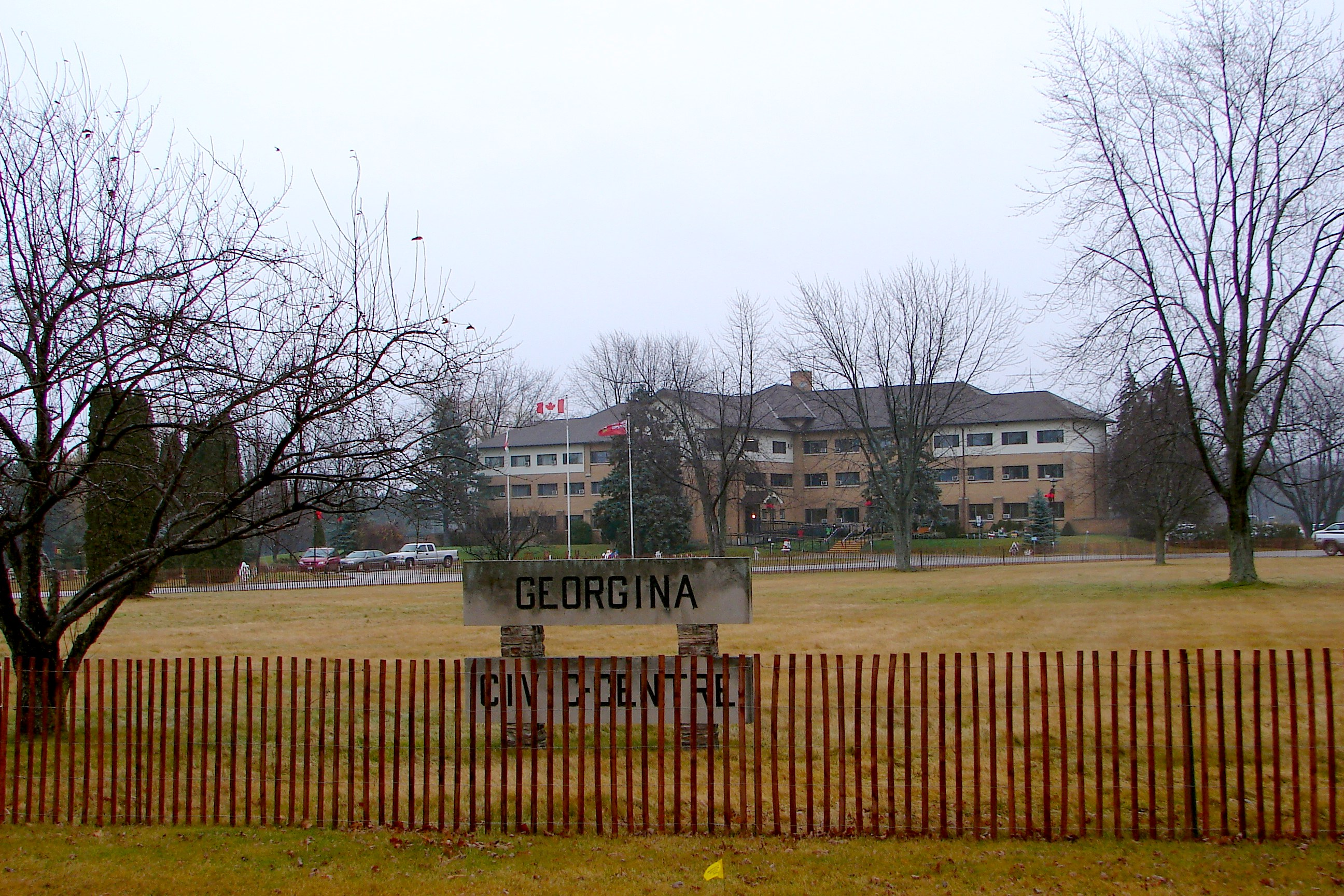
Georgina Civic Centre

In 2014, Highway 404 was extended to meet the Keswick / East Gwillimbury border at Woodbine Ave., south of Ravenshoe Rd. Woodbine Avenue, the town's longest street, runs from Steeles Avenue at the Toronto-Markham border and ends at Lake Drive in Georgina.

== Education ==
Public elementary and secondary education in Keswick is overseen by York Region's two school boards: the York Region District School Board (YRDSB), and the York Catholic District School Board (YCDSB).

The YRDSB operates one secondary school in Keswick: Keswick High School, in addition to eight elementary schools: Deer Park P. S., Fairwood P. S., Jersey P. S., Keswick P. S., Lake Simcoe P. S., Lakeside P. S., R. L. Graham P. S., and W. J. Watson P. S.

The YCDSB operates one secondary school in Keswick: Our Lady of the Lake Catholic College School, in addition to two elementary schools: Prince of Peace and St. Thomas Aquinas.

== Media ==
Local papers include the Georgina Post, and the Georgina Advocate. The Georgina Advocate was delivered door to door on Thursdays.

== Points of interest ==
Notable buildings in the area include Roche's Point Anglican Church, which dates to c. 1862.

=== Beechcroft and Lakehurst Gardens ===
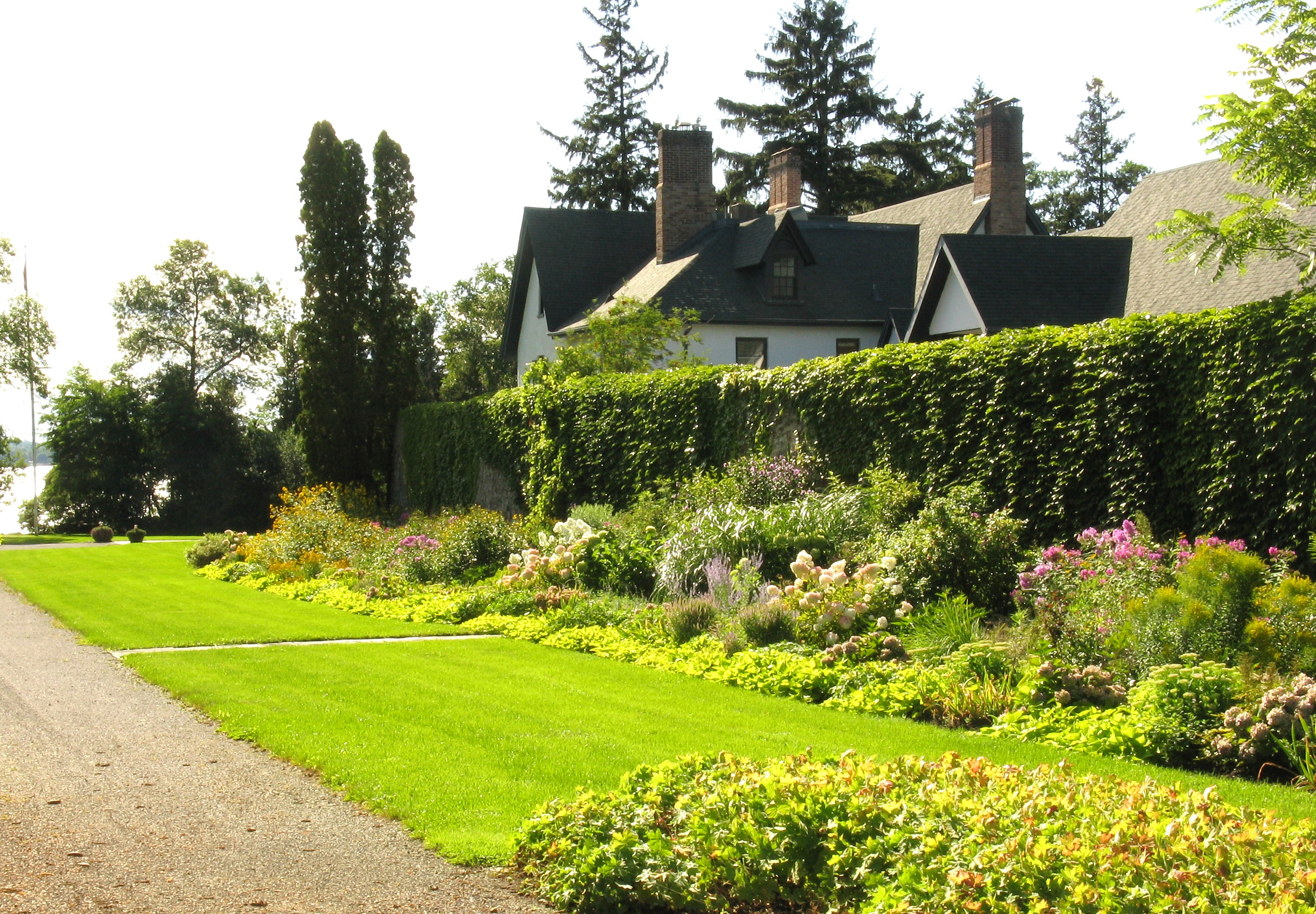
The Beechcroft and Lakehurst Gardens National Historic Site may have been influenced by the work of Frederick Law Olmsted.

Beechcroft and Lakehurst Gardens National Historic site consists of two properties along the shoreline of Lake Simcoe.

The Beechcroft property was an estate on 97 acres that had been owned by Captain Issac May around the 1860s. The English-landscape-inspired grounds were laid out for the owner Anson Greene Phelps Dodge, an American-Canadian lumber baron and short-lived Member of Parliament, around 1870 and are believed to have been designed or influenced by Frederick Law Olmsted. Unlike Beechcroft, Lakehurst Gardens was a formal horticultural garden.

Although designated historical, the grounds are privately owned, with no public access.

== Notable people ==
- Erin Ambrose
- Sharon Belle
- David Boothby
- Len Carlson
- Ernie Godden
- Joel Hanley
- Tim Jacobs
- Curtis Joseph
- Chris Tierney
- Sean Walker
- Whipper Billy Watson
