= Father Bressani Catholic High School =

Location
- 250 Ansley Grove Road; York Region; Woodbridge, Ontario, L4L 3W4; Canada; 43°47′55″N 79°33′48″W

Information
- School type: Secondary School
- Motto: Omnia in Christo (All things in Christ)
- Religious affiliation: Roman Catholic
- Founded: 1983
- School board: York Catholic District School Board
- Superintendent: Tim Laliberte
- Area trustee: Angela Grella, Jennifer Wigston
- School number: 849901
- Principal: Edward Lavor
- Grades: 9–12
- Age range: 13–18
- Enrolment: 1272 (October 31, 2023)
  - Grade 9: 293
  - Grade 10: 321
  - Grade 11: 363
  - Grade 12: 245
- Language: English, French
- Hours in school day: 6
- Area: 10 Acres
- Colours: Black, white, royal blue
- Mascot: Eagle
- Team name: Bressani Eagles
- Website: fbh.ycdsb.ca
- Last updated: January 11, 2025

Father Bressani Catholic High School (or Father Bressani) is a secondary school in Woodbridge, Ontario, Canada, operated by the York Catholic District School Board (YCDSB). The school was founded in 1983, and offers the Advanced Placement Program, as well as a French Immersion Program. School mass at Father Bressani occurs at the Immaculate Conception Parish.

== Feeder schools ==
Father Bressani's feeder schools are the following:

- Immaculate Conception Elementary School
- St. Gabriel the Archangel
- St. Gregory the Great
- St. John Bosco

=== Dual and triple feeder schools ===
Feeder schools of students in the following schools are determined by the location of their home address:

==== Dual feeder schools for Holy Cross and Father Bressani ====
- St. Catherine of Siena
- St. Margaret Mary

==== Dual feeder schools for St. Jean de Brebeuf and Father Bressani ====
- St. Clare

==== Triple feeder schools for Holy Cross, St. Jean de Brebeuf, and Father Bressani ====
- Our Lady of Fatima
- St. Andrew
- St. Padre Pio
- St. Stephen

== Notable alumni ==
- David Rocco, author and television personality
- Dina Pugliese, former co-host of Citytv's Breakfast Television
- Mark Cundari, former professional ice hockey player for EC VSV
- Robert Barbieri, former rugby player for Benetton Treviso and the Leicester Tigers
- Vince Petrasso, former football player and director of the Woodbridge Strikers

== See also ==
- Education in Ontario
- List of secondary schools in Ontario
