= Sean Walker (ice hockey) =

Canadian ice hockey player (born 1994)

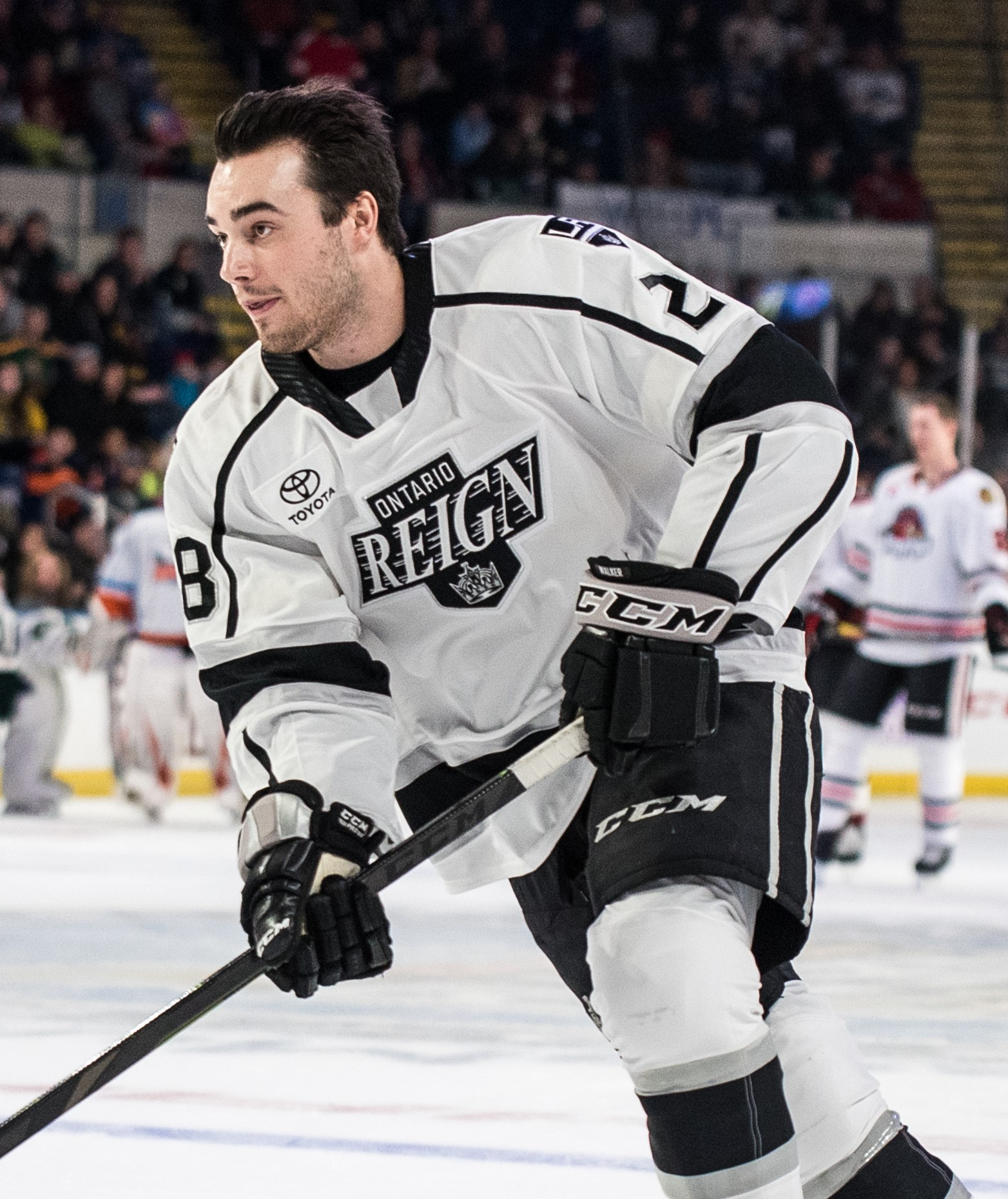
- Walker with the Ontario Reign in 2019
- Born: November 13, 1994 (age 31) Keswick, Ontario, Canada
- Height: 5 ft 11 in (180 cm)
- Weight: 191 lb (87 kg; 13 st 9 lb)
- Position: Defence
- Shoots: Right
- NHL team Former teams: Carolina Hurricanes; Los Angeles Kings; Philadelphia Flyers; Colorado Avalanche
- National team: Canada
- NHL draft: Undrafted
- Playing career: 2017–present

Sean Iain Walker (born November 13, 1994) is a Canadian professional ice hockey player who is a defenceman for the Carolina Hurricanes of the National Hockey League (NHL).

Undrafted, he previously played college ice hockey for Bowling Green State University where he was twice named to the All-WCHA Second Team. Walker won the Stanley Cup with the Hurricanes in 2026.

== Playing career ==
Walker began his minor hockey career playing for the Georgina Blaze AA hockey in Keswick, Ontario. He then moved up to play with York Simcoe Express AAA in the Eastern AAA Hockey League. Following the York Simcoe Express, Walker played Junior ice hockey with Georgina Ice for the 2011–12 season. While playing in his first season with Georgina Ice, Walker was called up by the Newmarket Hurricanes, Georgina Ice's Junior "A" ice hockey affiliate, for five games. He then spent one season with the Newmarket Hurricanes, tallying 24 points in 53 games. It was during his first full year with the Hurricanes that Walker committed to playing college ice hockey at Bowling Green State University.

=== Collegiate ===
In his freshman year at Bowling Green University, he played in 38 games. His 13 points that season ranked second among Falcon rookies as he helped guide them to the 2014 WCHA Men's Ice Hockey Tournament. However, the Bowling Green Falcons lost in the Semi-Finals to Minnesota State. In his sophomore year, Walker played in all 39 games of the season and had a +10 on-ice rating. At the end of the season, Walker was awarded the team's Jim Ruehl Best Defensive Player award.

In October 2015, Walker was named the captain of the Bowling Green Falcons. At the conclusion of his junior year, and first as a captain, Walker was named to the All-WCHA Second Team. He was again named captain for his senior year and named to the All-WCHA Second Team for the second time. Following his senior year at Bowling Green University, Walker signed with the Ontario Reign of the American Hockey League (AHL) to begin his professional career.

=== Professional ===
==== Los Angeles Kings ====
Walker made the Reign's 2017–18 opening night roster out of training camp. He scored his first professional point in a 7–4 loss to the Cleveland Monsters on October 27, 2017. Walker ended the season having played in 64 regular season games for the Reign and collecting 28 points.

Walker signed a two-year, entry-level contract with the Los Angeles Kings on July 3, 2018, after playing one season in the AHL. Walker began the 2018–19 season with the Reign after being cut from training camp. After playing in seven games for the Reign, and collecting six points, Walker was recalled from the Reign to the NHL on October 22. He made his NHL debut on October 23, against the Dallas Stars, and recorded his first NHL point in his debut with an assist on Tyler Toffoli's second period goal. After playing in three games, Walker and teammate Austin Wagner were re-assigned to the AHL. Walker was recalled to the NHL on December 21, and scored his first career NHL goal on December 31, against the Colorado Avalanche. He scored in the first period to help the Kings take the lead but the goal was called back due to goaltender interference. Walker scored again later that game in the second period, and the goal was upheld. The Kings won the game 3–2 in overtime. On January 3, 2019, while playing with the Kings, Walker was selected to the Pacific Division All-Stars for the 2019 American Hockey League All-Star Classic.

Walker participated in the Kings training camp and made their 2019–20 opening night roster. He skated in 70 games for the club, scoring 24 points as the Kings failed to make the 2020 Stanley Cup playoffs. On September 11, 2020, the Kings signed Walker to a four-year, $10.6 million contract extension.

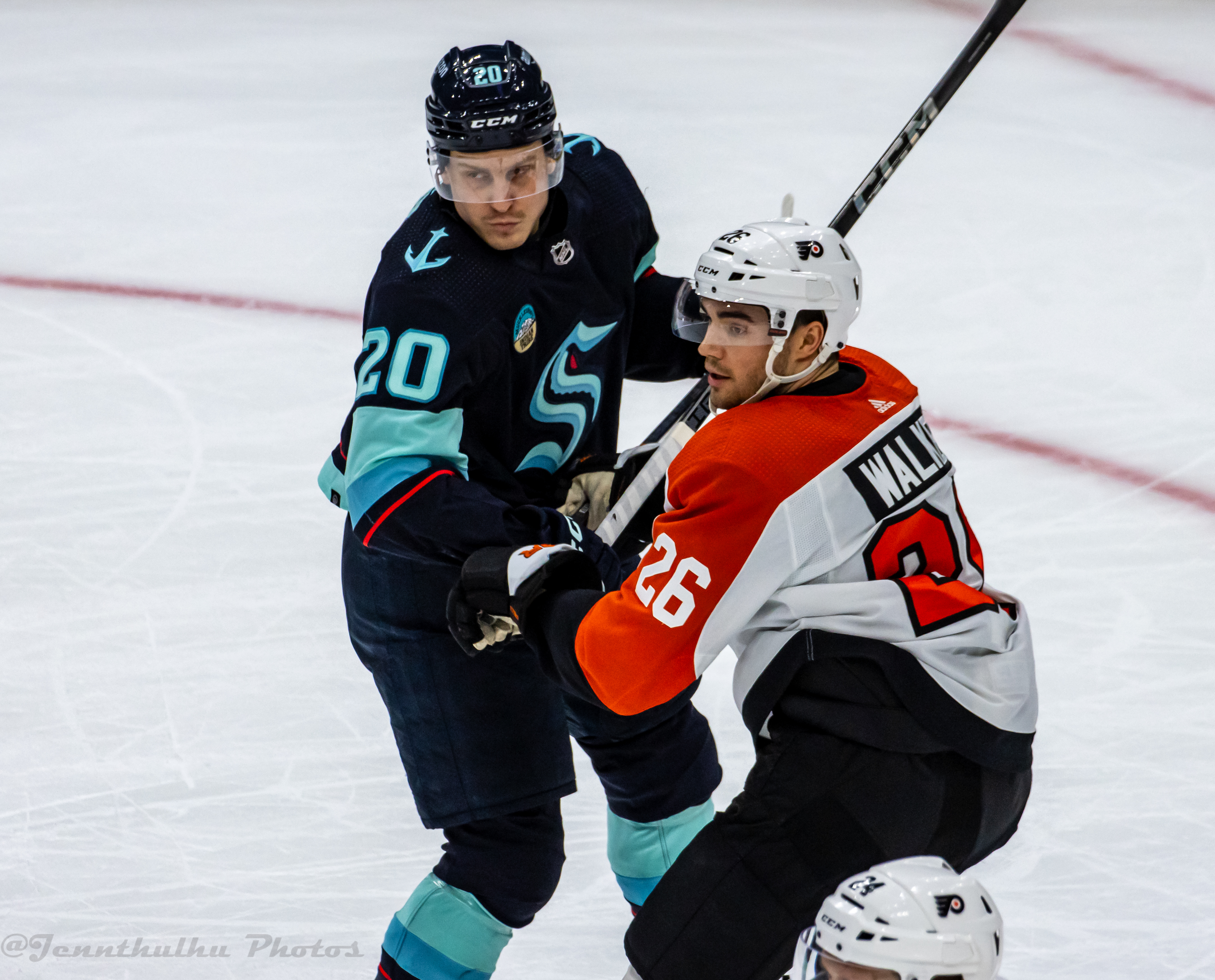
Walker (right) and Eeli Tolvanen of the Seattle Kraken in 2023.

==== Philadelphia Flyers ====
On June 6, 2023, approaching his final season under contract, the Kings traded Walker to the Philadelphia Flyers as part of a three-team trade also involving the Columbus Blue Jackets. In the 2023–24 season, Walker made an immediate impact on the Flyers blueline and was second among team defensemen in scoring through 63 regular season games, having already surpassed his career high with 6 goals, while his 22 points were the highest he has posted since the 2020 with Los Angeles.

==== Colorado Avalanche ====
Approaching the NHL trade deadline, on March 6, 2024, the Flyers traded Walker to the Colorado Avalanche along with a 2026 fifth-round pick in exchange for forward Ryan Johansen and a first-round pick in the 2025 NHL entry draft. Walker continued to contribute offensively with the Avalanche notching 7 points in 18 regular season games and establishing new season highs with a combined 10 goals and 29 points in 81 regular season games. In the playoffs, Walker was utilised in a bottom pairing role with Colorado, going scoreless through 11 appearances.

==== Carolina Hurricanes ====
As a free agent at the conclusion of his contract with the Avalanche, Walker was signed to a five-year, $18 million contract with the Carolina Hurricanes on July 1, 2024.

== Personal life ==
Walker graduated from Our Lady of the Lake Catholic College School in 2012.

== Career statistics ==
=== Regular season and playoffs ===
			Regular season					Playoffs
Season	Team	League	GP	G	A	Pts	PIM	GP	G	A	Pts	PIM
2010–11	York Simcoe Express 18U AAA	ETAHL	—	—	—	—	—	—	—	—	—	—
2011–12	Georgina Ice	COJHL	36	4	11	15	32	9	1	2	3	6
2011–12	Newmarket Hurricanes	OJHL	5	0	3	3	2	—	—	—	—	—
2012–13	Newmarket Hurricanes	OJHL	53	4	20	24	61	24	0	4	4	42
2013–14	Bowling Green State University	WCHA	38	2	11	13	75	—	—	—	—	—
2014–15	Bowling Green State University	WCHA	39	5	15	20	85	—	—	—	—	—
2015–16	Bowling Green State University	WCHA	42	5	18	23	48	—	—	—	—	—
2016–17	Bowling Green State University	WCHA	41	10	14	24	42	—	—	—	—	—
2017–18	Ontario Reign	AHL	64	7	21	28	59	4	1	1	2	0
2018–19	Ontario Reign	AHL	22	6	11	17	18	—	—	—	—	—
2018–19	Los Angeles Kings	NHL	39	3	7	10	8	—	—	—	—	—
2019–20	Los Angeles Kings	NHL	70	5	19	24	26	—	—	—	—	—
2020–21	Los Angeles Kings	NHL	47	5	13	18	18	—	—	—	—	—
2021–22	Los Angeles Kings	NHL	6	0	2	2	4	—	—	—	—	—
2022–23	Los Angeles Kings	NHL	70	3	10	13	36	2	0	0	0	0
2023–24	Philadelphia Flyers	NHL	63	6	16	22	34	—	—	—	—	—
2023–24	Colorado Avalanche	NHL	18	4	3	7	16	11	0	0	0	6
2024–25	Carolina Hurricanes	NHL	82	5	11	16	46	12	1	2	3	2
2025–26	Carolina Hurricanes	NHL	81	9	22	31	59	19	0	3	3	16
NHL totals			476	40	103	143	247	44	1	5	6	24

Medal record

Representing Canada

Ice hockey

World Championships
Gold medal – first place	2021 Latvia	

=== International ===
Year	Team	Event	Result	GP	G	A	Pts	PIM
2021	Canada	WC	1st place, gold medalist(s)	10	0	2	2	12
Senior totals				10	0	2	2	12

== Awards and honours ==
Award	Year	Ref
College
All-WCHA Second Team	2016, 2017	
NCAA (WCHA) All-Academic Team	2016, 2017	
Jim Ruehl Best Defensive Player award	2015	
AHL
AHL All-Star Game	2019	
NHL
Stanley Cup champion	2026	
