= York Catholic District School Board =

School board in Ontario, Canada

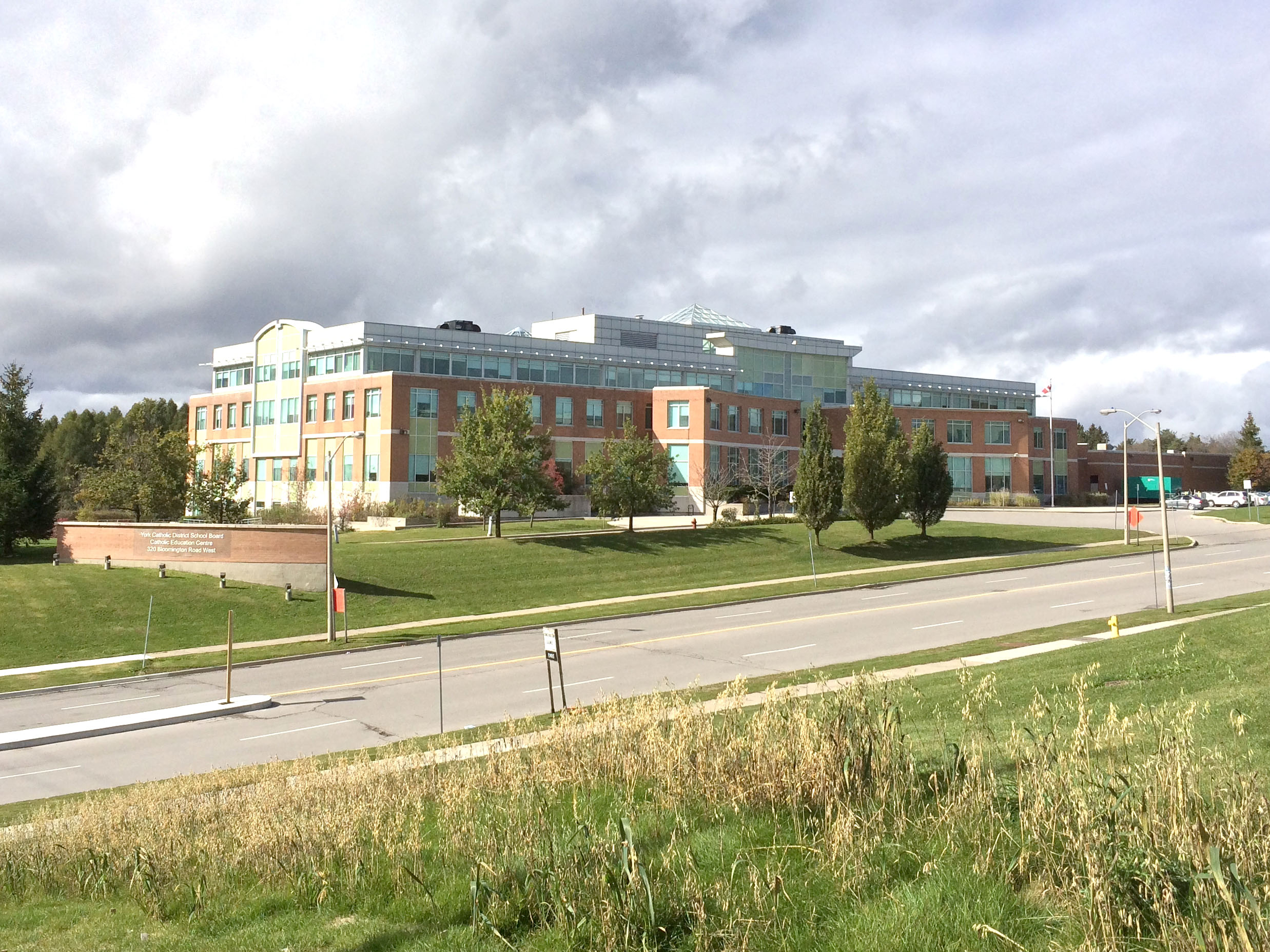
- Headquarters of the York Catholic District School Board in Aurora

Location
- 320 Bloomington Road West, Aurora, Ontario All of York Regional Municipality Canada

District information
- Grades: K-12
- Chief executive officer: John De Faveri
- Chair of the board: Elizabeth Crowe
- Schools: 102; 86 elementary, 17 secondary
- Budget: CAD$607.5 million (2020–2021)
- District ID: B67075

Other information
- Elected Trustees: 10
- Student Trustees: 3 Jonah James (Senior) Amira Zamanifar (Senior) Monica Galstyan (Junior)
- Website: http://www.ycdsb.ca/

The York Catholic District School Board (YCDSB, known as English-language Separate District School Board No. 42 prior to 1999) is the English-language public-separate school district authority for the Regional Municipality of York in Ontario, Canada. Its head office is in Aurora.

The YCDSB operates schools in each of the nine municipalities in York Region. It employs over 5,000 instructional staff to teach over 54,000 students in 86 elementary schools and 17 secondary schools. The school board until 1998 was originally known as the York Region Roman Catholic Separate School Board (YRRCSSB) as an anglophone/francophone school district.

== Instructional services ==
The Instructional Services department is responsible for the development and delivery of the YCDSB curriculum, guided by the following criteria:

- religious education,
- alternative education,
- continuing education,
- co-operative education,
- student assessment, and
- equity in curriculum.

The 86 elementary schools are administered as part of an elementary school area; there are four areas in the school board. Each area is administered by a superintendent of education, and the schools are divided into two groups, each of which has a trustee.

The 17 secondary schools are administered as a single group with two superintendents of education. Each school also has at least one trustee, and each trustee may serve one or more schools.

The department also has a superintendent of curriculum & assessment, and a superintendent of education & student services.

== Notable Elementary Schools ==
School Name	Street Address	Community
St. John XXIII Catholic Elementary School	125 Krieghoff Ave	Unionville
St. Justin Martyr Catholic Elementary School	140 Hollingham Rd	Unionville
Sainte-Marguerite-Bourgeoys Catholic Elementary School	111 John Button Blvd	Markham

== Secondary Schools ==
School name	Street address	Community
Cardinal Carter Catholic High School	210 Bloomington Rd. W.	Aurora
St. Maximillian Kolbe Catholic High School	278 Wellington St.	Aurora
Our Lady of the Lake Catholic College School	185 Glenwoods Ave.	Keswick
St. Joan of Arc Catholic High School	1 St. Joan of Arc Ave.	Maple
Father Michael McGivney Catholic Academy	5300 14th Ave.	Markham
St. Augustine Catholic High School	2188 Rodick Road	Markham
St. Brother André Catholic High School	6160 16th Ave. E.	Markham
St. Robert Catholic High School	8101 Leslie St.	Markham
Sacred Heart Catholic High School	1 Crusader Way	Newmarket
Our Lady Queen of the World Catholic Academy	10475 Bayview Ave.	Richmond Hill
St. Theresa of Lisieux Catholic High School	230 Shaftsbury Ave.	Richmond Hill
St. Elizabeth Catholic High School	525 New Westminster Dr.	Thornhill
St. Luke Catholic Learning Centre	160 Dubley Ave.	Thornhill
Father Bressani Catholic High School	250 Ansley Grove Rd.	Woodbridge
Holy Cross Catholic Academy	7501 Martin Grove Rd.	Woodbridge
St. Katharine Drexel Catholic High School	55 Meridian Drive.	Stouffville
St. Jean de Brebeuf Catholic High School	2 Davos Rd.	Woodbridge

== See also ==
- York Region District School Board
- Conseil scolaire de district catholique Centre-Sud
- Conseil scolaire Viamonde
- Archdiocese of Toronto
- Education in Ontario
- List of school districts in Ontario
- List of high schools in Ontario
