= Sacred Heart Catholic High School (Newmarket) =

Catholic high school in Newmarket, Canada

Coordinates: 44°3′29″N 79°26′24″W

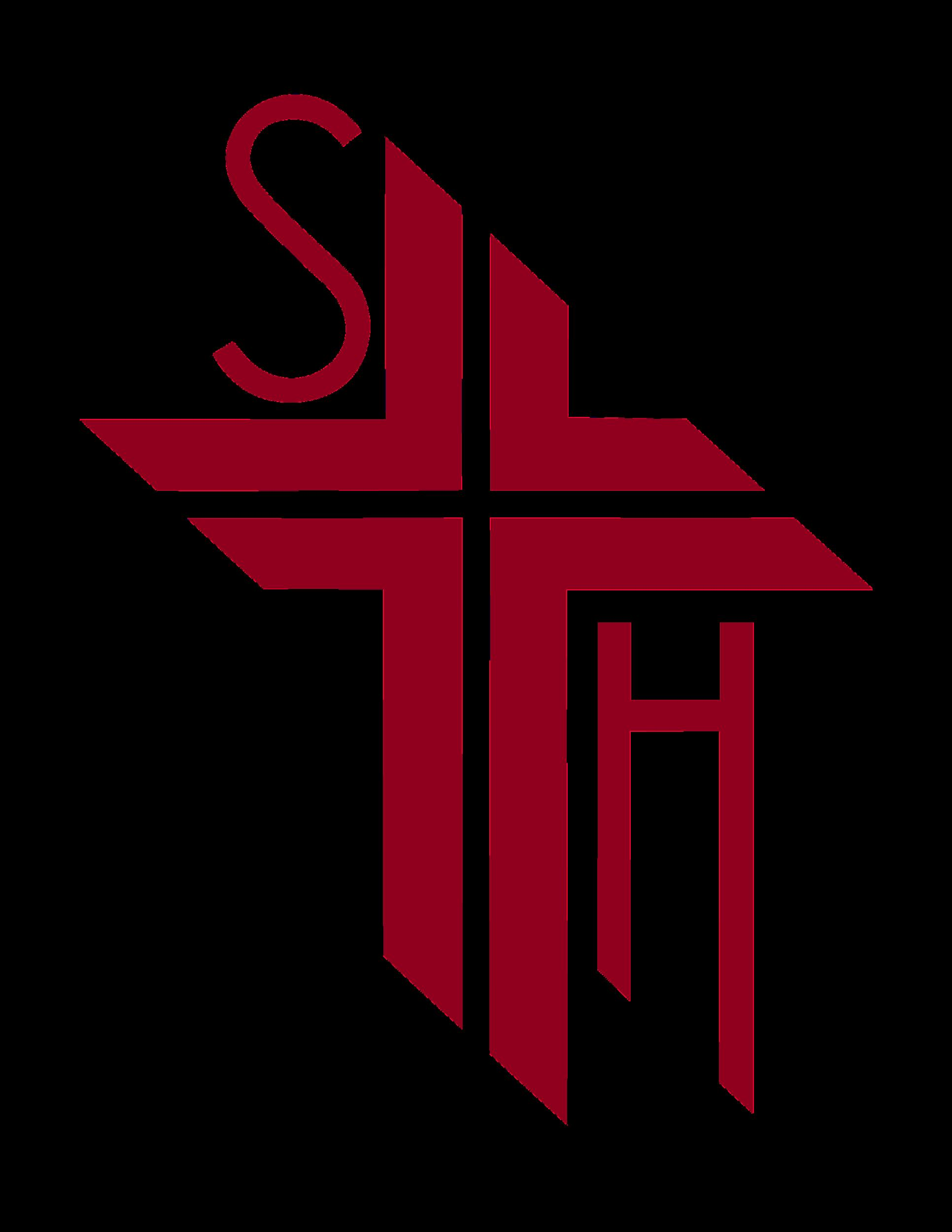

- Sacred Heart (Ontario)

Location
- 908 Lemar Road; Newmarket, Ontario; Canada

Information
- School type: High school
- Motto: "A community called to share in the development of the whole person"
- Religious affiliation: Roman Catholic
- Founded: 1979
- School board: York Catholic District School Board
- Superintendent: Joel Chiutsi
- Area trustee: Theresa McNicol
- Principal: Donato Anthony Dilallo
- Grades: 9-12
- Enrolment: 1188 (2020)
- Language: English
- Colours: Maroon and Grey
- Mascot: Corky the Crusader
- Team name: Sentinels
- Website: http://sahe.ycdsb.ca/

Sacred Heart Catholic High School is a public Catholic high school in Newmarket, Ontario, Canada. It is currently the only high school in Newmarket under the jurisdiction of the York Catholic District School Board. The school contains 2 SHSM programmes for students to take, an arts SHSM and a health SHSM. There were 1620 full-time registered students for the 2005/2006 year, 95 full-time staff members, and 24 support staff.

== History ==
In January 1969, the York Region Separate School Board came into existence with the combining of eleven small school boards. Initially, the Board continued to transport students to Catholic high schools in Metropolitan Toronto. In 1973, the Metro Separate School Board declared that these students could no longer be accommodated. Therefore, in 1974, the York Separate School Board decided to establish St. Robert Catholic High School in Thornhill, Ontario. In doing so, the Board made a statement that a second junior high school would be built north of Toronto at a future date "if the extension of Catholic education is supported by the Catholic community of York Region".

After four years St. Robert was filled to capacity. The Board, therefore, opened the doors of Sacred Heart Junior High School in September 1979, providing 265 students with a Grades 7 to 9 program. Through the cooperative efforts of the Board and the Toronto Archdiocese High School Commission, Grade 11 was introduced in September 1981 and one grade was added each subsequent year.

Simultaneously, a building program was undertaken and updated new facilities were made available to students in September 1983. The student population continued to increase and a new addition to the building was opened in May 1987.

In 2002 two new additions were added which gave the school a new cafeteria, upgraded physical education equipment and facilities, an expanded library resource centre, a theatre/lecture hall, new administrative offices as well as guidance and special education additions.

Another major renovation took place in the summer of 2004. The entire second floor of the old wing received new Science Labs and Art Rooms.

In 2020, Sacred Heart CHS created the Integrated Regional Arts Program (iRAP) for students that are excelling in arts, or would like to take arts courses.

== Community ==
In the spring of 2012, Sacred Heart's students' raised over $150,000 for Relay for Life, the highest amount ever raised by any high school in Canada. The graduating class were featured on a CTV News broadcast. They raised $143,000 in 2014. In 2016, the students raised over $186,000, setting both a personal and Canada-wide record yet again.

== Notable alumni ==
- Steve Downie – former Pittsburgh Penguins player and member of the gold medal-winning 2006 and 2007 Canadian World Junior hockey teams
- Sheila Reid – distance runner who represented Canada at the 2012 Summer Olympics in London.
- Italia Ricci - actress

== See also ==
- Education in Ontario
- List of secondary schools in Ontario
