= Forest green =

Average color of the leaves of the trees of a temperate zone deciduous forest

Color coordinates
- Hex triplet: #228B22
- sRGB^{B} (r, g, b): (34, 139, 34)
- HSV (h, s, v): (120°, 76%, 55%)
- CIELCh_{uv} (L, C, h): (51, 70, 128°)
- Source: X11
- ISCC–NBS descriptor: Vivid yellowish green
- B: Normalized to [0–255] (byte)

Forest green is a representation of the average color of the leaves of the trees of a temperate zone deciduous forest.

The first recorded use of forest green as a color name in English was in 1810.

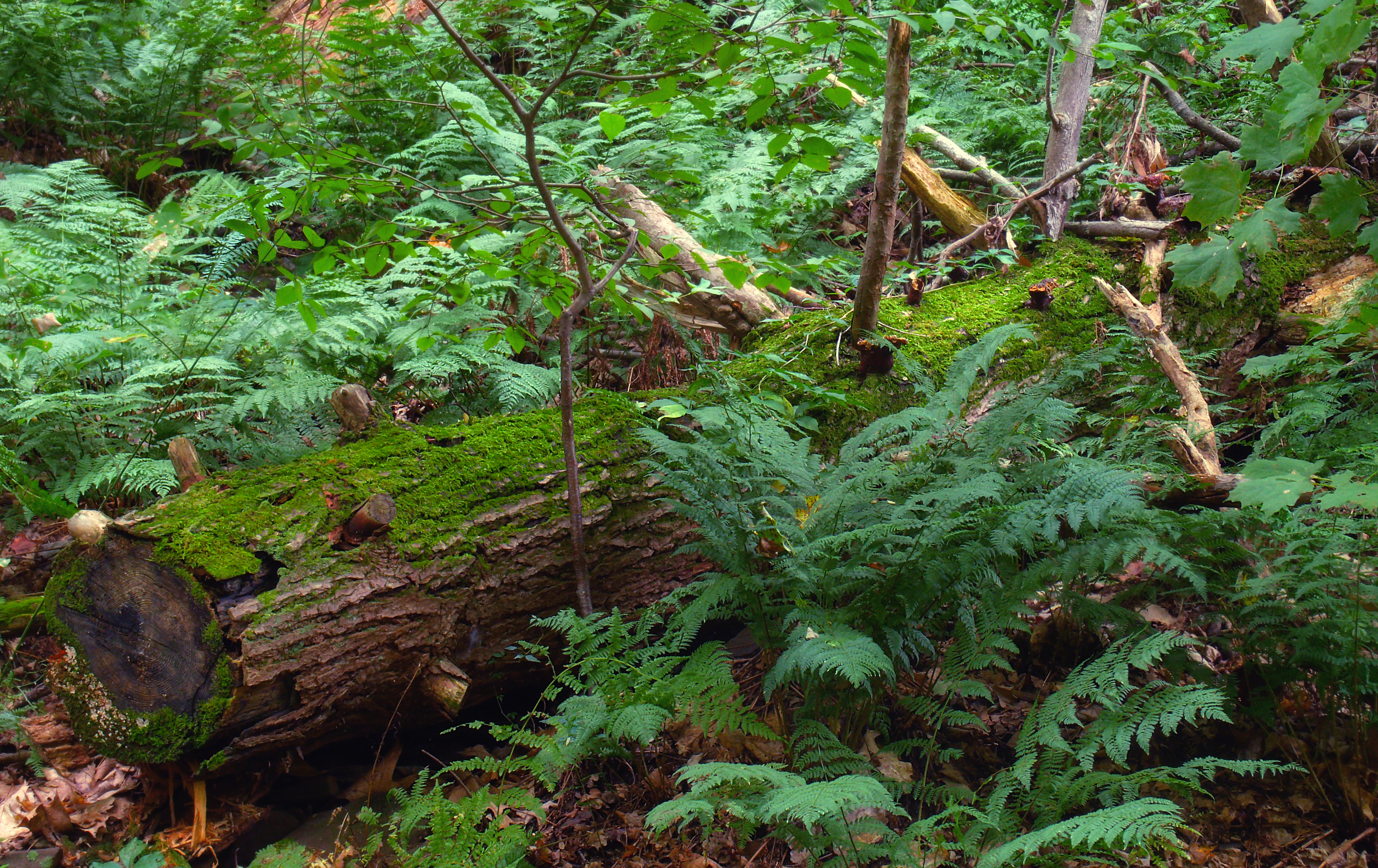
Ferns in a forest

When written as an HTML color name, it is written without a space: forestgreen.

== Shades ==
=== Forest green (Crayola) ===
Forest green (Crayola)

Color coordinates
- Hex triplet: #5FA777
- sRGB^{B} (r, g, b): (95, 167, 119)
- HSV (h, s, v): (140°, 43%, 65%)
- CIELCh_{uv} (L, C, h): (63, 45, 139°)
- Source: Crayola
- B: Normalized to [0–255] (byte)

Displayed at right is the color called "forest green" in Crayola crayons. Forest green has been a Crayola crayon name since 1958, when it was renamed from dark green.

=== Tropical rainforest ===
Tropical Rainforest

Color coordinates
- Hex triplet: #00755E
- sRGB^{B} (r, g, b): (0, 117, 94)
- HSV (h, s, v): (168°, 100%, 46%)
- CIELCh_{uv} (L, C, h): (44, 38, 163°)
- Source: Crayola
- ISCC–NBS descriptor: Moderate green
- B: Normalized to [0–255] (byte)

Displayed at right is the color tropical rainforest, a bluish-shade of forest green.

The color tropical rainforest was formulated by Crayola in 1993.

=== Petrified forest ===
Petrified Forest

Color coordinates
- Hex triplet: #005B39
- sRGB^{B} (r, g, b): (0, 91, 57)
- HSV (h, s, v): (158°, 100%, 36%)
- CIELCh_{uv} (L, C, h): (34, 35, 146°)
- Source: Crayola
- B: Normalized to [0–255] (byte)

Displayed at right is the color petrified forest, a metallic shade of forest green.

The color petrified forest was formulated by Crayola in 2019. It was one of eight new Metallic FX colors that year.

Although this is supposed to be a metallic color, there is no mechanism for displaying metallic colors on a computer.

== In culture ==
=== Cartography ===
- Forest green is used to represent deciduous forest on maps depicting natural vegetation.

=== Environmentalism ===
- Forest green may be used to represent the Green movement, especially in graphic design for environmental literature regarding issues having to do with forest conservation.
- A forest green environmentalist (also called a dark green environmentalist) is an environmentalist who is seriously committed to environmentalism.

=== School colors ===
- Forest green is one of the school colors of University of the Philippines, The Evergreen State College, Agincourt Collegiate Institute, Wagner College, Cass Technical High School, The Westminster Schools, Newark Arts High School (Newark, New Jersey), Canyon Lake High School, St Robert Catholic High School, Westlake High School, Mesa Verde High School (Citrus Heights, California), and Elk Grove High School (Elk Grove Village, Illinois).

=== Scouting ===
- Forest green is used in the uniforms of the Boy Scouts of America, Venture Scouts, and other Scouting organizations.

=== Military ===
- Forest green is a frequent color used in woodland camouflage. Beyond camo uniforms, soldiers will spray their weapons using a multitude of colors including forest green to what would otherwise be black or wooden material.

=== Sports ===
- Forest green is one of the team colors of the Nottingham Hoods, an English basketball team. It is also found on the team colors of the Saskatchewan Roughriders, as related to the flag of Saskatchewan. The Minnesota Wild of the NHL has forest green as one of their team colors.

== See also ==
- Pine green
