= Jordan Romano =

Canadian baseball player (born 1993)

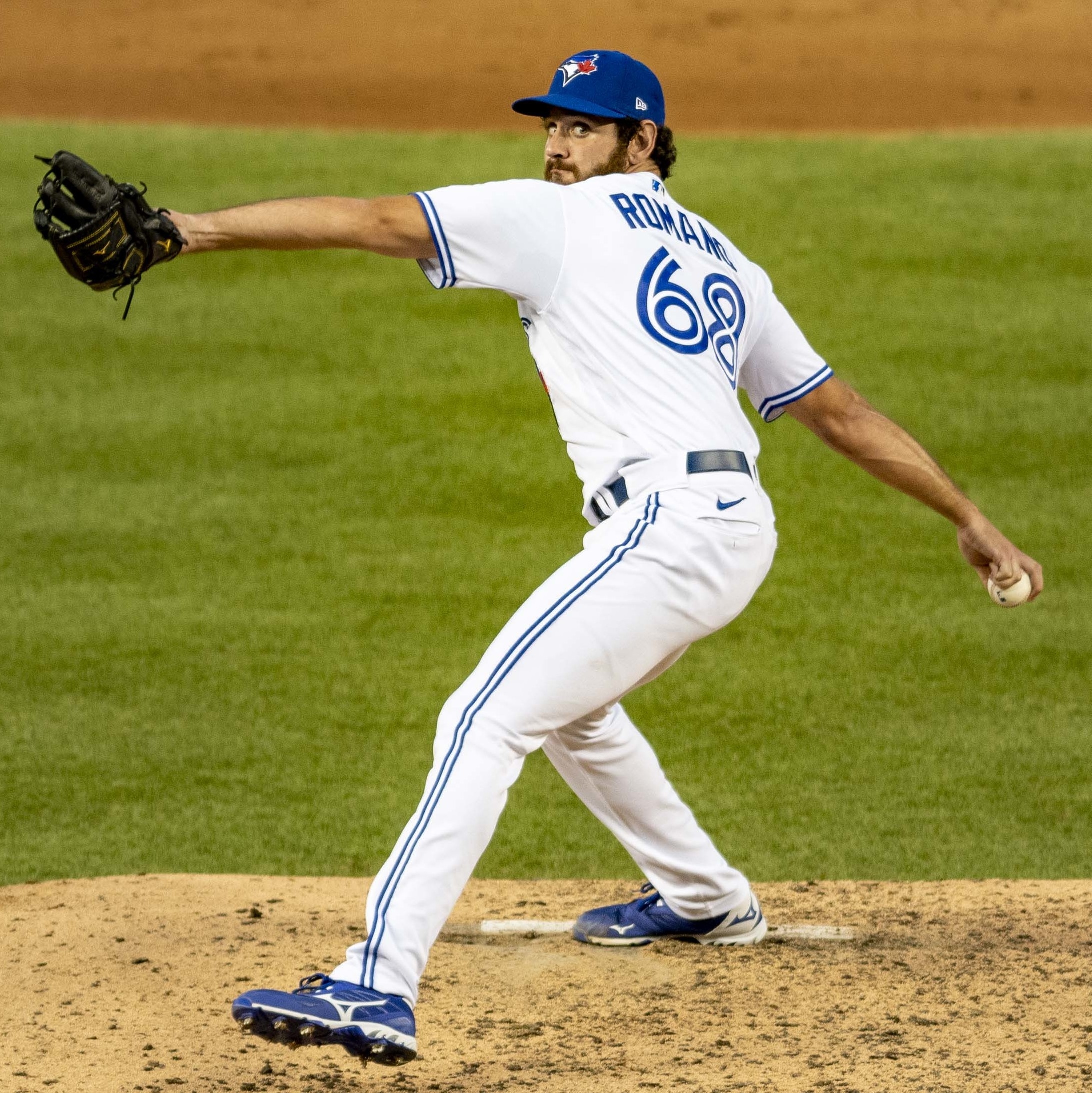
- Romano with the Toronto Blue Jays in 2020

Free agent
- Pitcher
- Born: April 21, 1993 (age 33); Markham, Ontario, Canada
- Bats: Right Throws: Right

MLB debut
- June 12, 2019, for the Toronto Blue Jays

MLB statistics (through 2026 season)
- Win–loss record: 22–25
- Earned run average: 3.94
- Strikeouts: 371
- Saves: 128
- Stats at Baseball Reference

Teams
- Toronto Blue Jays (2019–2024); Philadelphia Phillies (2025); Los Angeles Angels (2026); Colorado Rockies (2026)

Career highlights and awards
- 2× All-Star (2022, 2023)

Jordan Robert Romano (born April 21, 1993) is a Canadian professional baseball pitcher who is a free agent. He has played in Major League Baseball (MLB) for the Toronto Blue Jays, Philadelphia Phillies, Los Angeles Angels, and Colorado Rockies. Romano is a two-time All-Star.

Romano set the Blue Jays franchise record for most consecutive saves converted (31), passing the previous record held by Tom Henke (25). Romano's career 128 saves is the 3rd most by a Canadian-born player.

== High school and college ==
Romano attended Father Michael McGivney Catholic Academy in his home town of Markham, Ontario. A standout athlete, he excelled in baseball, basketball, soccer, and volleyball. Undrafted out of high school, he attended Connors State College. In his first season for Connors State, Romano pitched to a 0–1 win–loss record, 8.68 earned run average (ERA), and 14 strikeouts in 9 1/3 innings. The following season, Romano made 10 starts and posted a 4–3 record with a 4.74 ERA and 53 strikeouts in 38 innings pitched, helping get the Cowboys to the National Junior College Athletic Association (NJCAA) World Series. After the season, Romano transferred to Oral Roberts University, where he played one season for the Golden Eagles. Pitching as the team's closer, Romano made 29 relief appearances and posted a 3–4 record, 11 saves, 2.66 ERA, and 49 strikeouts in 40 2/3 innings.

== Professional career ==
=== Toronto Blue Jays ===
==== Minor leagues ====
Romano was selected in the tenth round of the 2014 Major League Baseball draft by the Toronto Blue Jays. He received a $25,000 signing bonus and was assigned to the Rookie-level Gulf Coast League Blue Jays. After making two appearances, he was promoted to the Bluefield Blue Jays of the Rookie-Advanced Appalachian League, where he finished the 2014 season. In 13 total appearances, Romano posted a 1–1 record, 1.93 ERA, and 34 strikeouts in 28 innings pitched. During spring training for the 2015 season, Romano tore his ulnar collateral ligament, and in April he underwent Tommy John surgery. Due to the procedure, he missed the entire 2015 minor league season. Romano was assigned to the Lansing Lugnuts of the Single-A Midwest League at the start of the 2016 season, and was activated off the disabled list on June 13, 2016, to make the first start of his professional career. In the start, he held the Great Lakes Loons to two hits while striking out seven in a 4–1 complete game win. Romano finished the 2016 season with a 3–2 record, 2.11 ERA, and 72 strikeouts in 72 2/3 innings pitched. He spent the entire 2017 minor league season with the Dunedin Blue Jays of the Advanced-A Florida State League, and pitched to a 7–5 record, 3.39 ERA, and 138 strikeouts in 138 innings.

In 2018, the Blue Jays invited Romano to spring training. He began the season with the New Hampshire Fisher Cats of the Double-A Eastern League. On May 16, Romano pitched six no-hit innings against the Hartford Yard Goats, and became the first pitcher in the minors to reach seven wins. After reaching an 8–0 record with a 2.04 ERA, Romano was promoted to the Triple-A Buffalo Bisons on May 27.

On December 13, 2018, Romano was taken third overall in the Rule 5 draft by the Chicago White Sox and was immediately traded to the Texas Rangers for cash considerations. On March 24, 2019, he was returned to the Blue Jays.

==== Major leagues ====
Romano opened the 2019 season back with Buffalo. On June 12, his contract was selected and he was called up to the major leagues for the first time. He made his major league debut that night, pitching a scoreless 7th inning in an 8–6 victory over the Baltimore Orioles and collecting his first major league strikeout against Pedro Severino.

On July 24, 2020, Romano earned his first MLB win. On August 21, he earned his first MLB save. With the 2020 Toronto Blue Jays, Romano appeared in 15 games, compiling a 2-1 record with 1.23 ERA and 21 strikeouts in 14 2/3 innings pitched. In 2021, Romano became the Blue Jays closer and went 7–1 with a 2.14 ERA in 63 innings, compiling 23 saves.

On April 11, 2022, Romano set a Blue Jays club record with his 26th consecutive converted save stretching back to the 2021 season, in helping the team to a 3–0 victory over the New York Yankees. On July 17, 2022, it was announced that Romano was selected to the American League All-Star team, his first ever selection.

In 2022, Romano finished third in the American League with 36 saves, striking out 73 batters in 64 innings with a 2.11 ERA. He was charged with the blown save and loss in the Blue Jays Wild Card Game 2 defeat giving up two runs.

On January 13, 2023, Romano signed a one-year, $4.5375 million contract with the Blue Jays, avoiding salary arbitration. He was named to his second-consecutive All-Star team on July 9. To that point in the season, he had recorded 25 saves with a 2.96 ERA

In 2024, Romano made 15 appearances for Toronto, struggling to a 6.59 ERA with 13 strikeouts and 8 saves over 13 2/3 innings pitched. On July 3, 2024, he was shut down for six weeks after undergoing arthroscopic surgery to repair an impingement in his throwing elbow. On September 7, manager John Schneider announced that Romano would be shut down for the remainder of the season. On November 22, the Blue Jays non–tendered Romano, making him a free agent.

=== Philadelphia Phillies ===
On December 9, 2024, Romano signed a one-year, $8.5 million contract with the Philadelphia Phillies. Romano made 49 relief appearances for the Phillies during the 2025 season, but struggled to a 2-4 record and 8.23 ERA with 47 strikeouts and eight saves across 42 2/3 innings pitched.

=== Los Angeles Angels ===
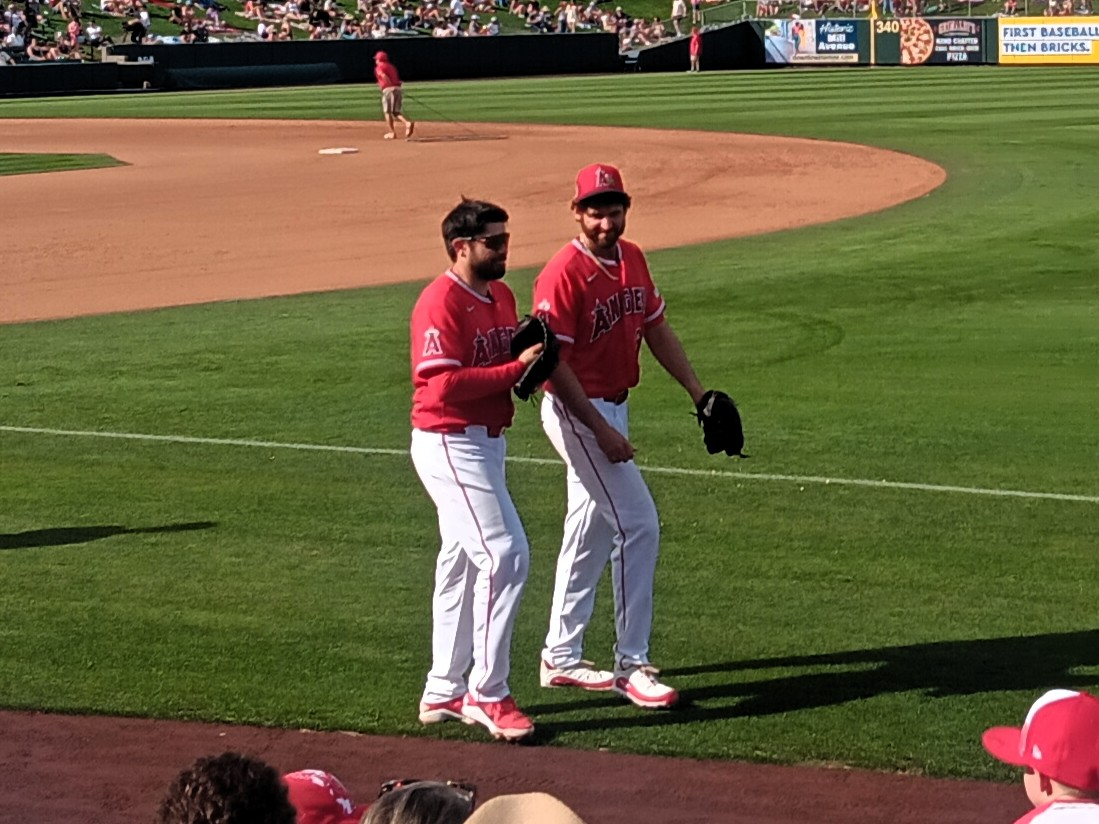
Romano (right) and Travis d'Arnaud during 2026 Spring Training with the Angels

On December 16, 2025, Romano signed a one year, $2 million contract with the Los Angeles Angels. He made 11 appearances for Los Angeles, registering an 0-2 record and 10.13 ERA with 12 strikeouts and four saves over eight innings of work. On April 26, 2026, Romano was designated for assignment by the Angels. He was released by the team the following day.

=== Colorado Rockies ===
On May 5, 2026, Romano signed a minor league contract with the Colorado Rockies. He made nine appearances for the Triple–A Albuquerque Isotopes, posting an 0–1 record and 4.15 ERA with 10 strikeouts and one save across 8 2/3 innings pitched. On July 4, the Rockies selected Romano's contract, adding him to their active roster.

== International baseball ==
In February 2017, it was announced that Romano would play for Team Italy at the 2017 World Baseball Classic.

At an undisclosed time, Romano agreed to play for Team Canada for the first time at the 2026 World Baseball Classic. However, he informed the team that he would not be available, after signing a one year contract with the Los Angeles Angels.

== Player profile ==
Romano is listed at 6 feet 5 inches (1.96 m) and 210 pounds (95.25kg). He utilizes 3 pitches, including the four-seam fastball (49% usage), the slider (46.4% usage), and the split finger (4.7% usage). Romano previously relied on the fastball and slider, but introduced the split finger in 2026.

His walkout song is Lethal Industry by Sunnery James & Ryan Marciano. Previously, he used Tsunami (Jay Cosmic Remix) by DVBBs & Borgeous.

== Personal life ==
Romano and his wife, Sam, announced the birth of their son in December 2025. He is of Italian descent.

Romano enjoys playing golf as a pastime. He frequently went to courses with other players on the Toronto Blue Jays, including Whit Merrifield.

== See also ==
- Rule 5 draft results
- List of Major League Baseball players from Canada
