= Tim Jacobs (ice hockey) =

Canadian ice hockey player

- Born: March 28, 1952 (age 74) Espanola, Ontario, Canada
- Height: 5 ft 10 in (178 cm)
- Weight: 180 lb (82 kg; 12 st 12 lb)
- Position: Defence
- Shot: Left
- Played for: California Golden Seals
- NHL draft: 70th overall, 1972; California Golden Seals
- Playing career: 1972–1979

Timothy James Jacobs (born March 28, 1952, in Espanola, Ontario, and raised in Keswick, Ontario) is a retired professional ice hockey defenceman who briefly played in the National Hockey League for the California Golden Seals.

== Career statistics ==
=== Regular season and playoffs ===
			Regular season					Playoffs
Season	Team	League	GP	G	A	Pts	PIM	GP	G	A	Pts	PIM
1969–70	St. Catharines Black Hawks	OHA	26	0	0	0	6	—	—	—	—	—
1970–71	St. Catharines Black Hawks	OHA	60	1	10	11	23	—	—	—	—	—
1971–72	St. Catharines Black Hawks	OHA	56	6	19	25	46	—	—	—	—	—
1972–73	Salt Lake Golden Eagles	WHL	72	7	14	21	33	9	0	1	1	18
1973–74	Salt Lake Golden Eagles	WHL	75	2	26	28	46	5	1	2	3	2
1974–75	Springfield Indians	AHL	73	3	31	34	57	17	2	13	15	28
1975–76	California Golden Seals	NHL	46	0	10	10	35	—	—	—	—	—
1975–76	Salt Lake Golden Eagles	CHL	30	4	12	16	22	—	—	—	—	—
1976–77	Salt Lake Golden Eagles	CHL	71	1	19	20	34	—	—	—	—	—
1977–78	Springfield Indians	AHL	78	6	20	26	16	4	0	1	1	0
1978–79	Springfield Indians	AHL	80	7	35	42	33	—	—	—	—	—
NHL totals			46	0	10	10	35	—	—	—	—	—
