= Gregorio Bressani =

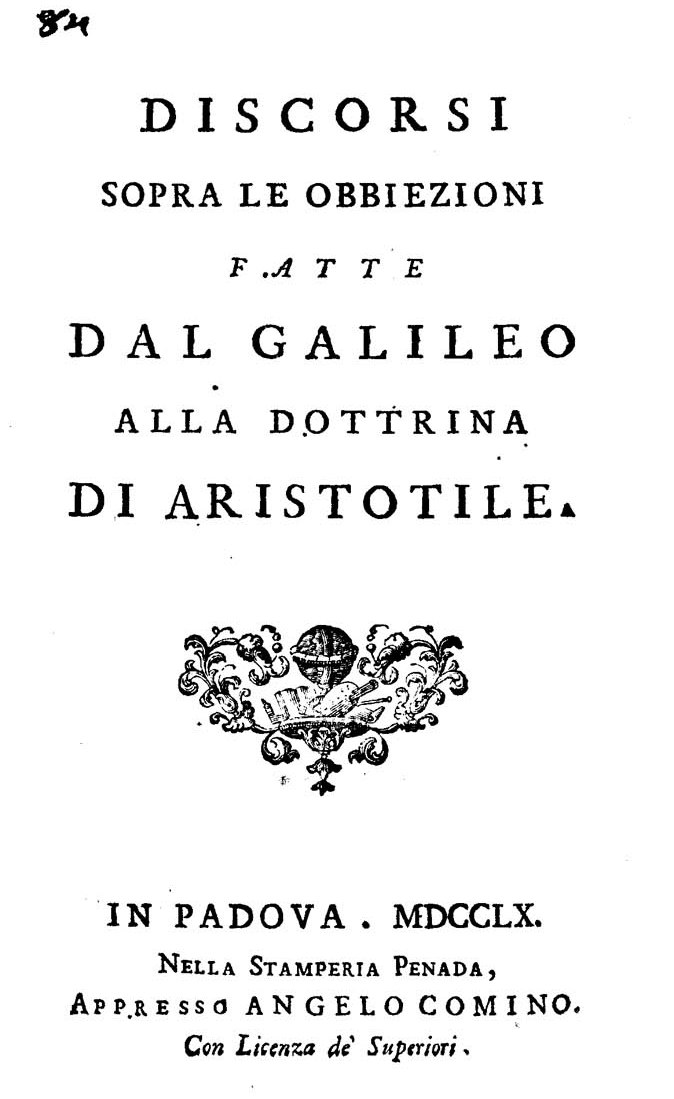
Discorsi sopra le obbiezioni fatte dal Galileo alla dottrina di Aristotile (1760)

Gregorio Bressani (3 February 1703 – 12 January 1771) was an Italian philosopher.

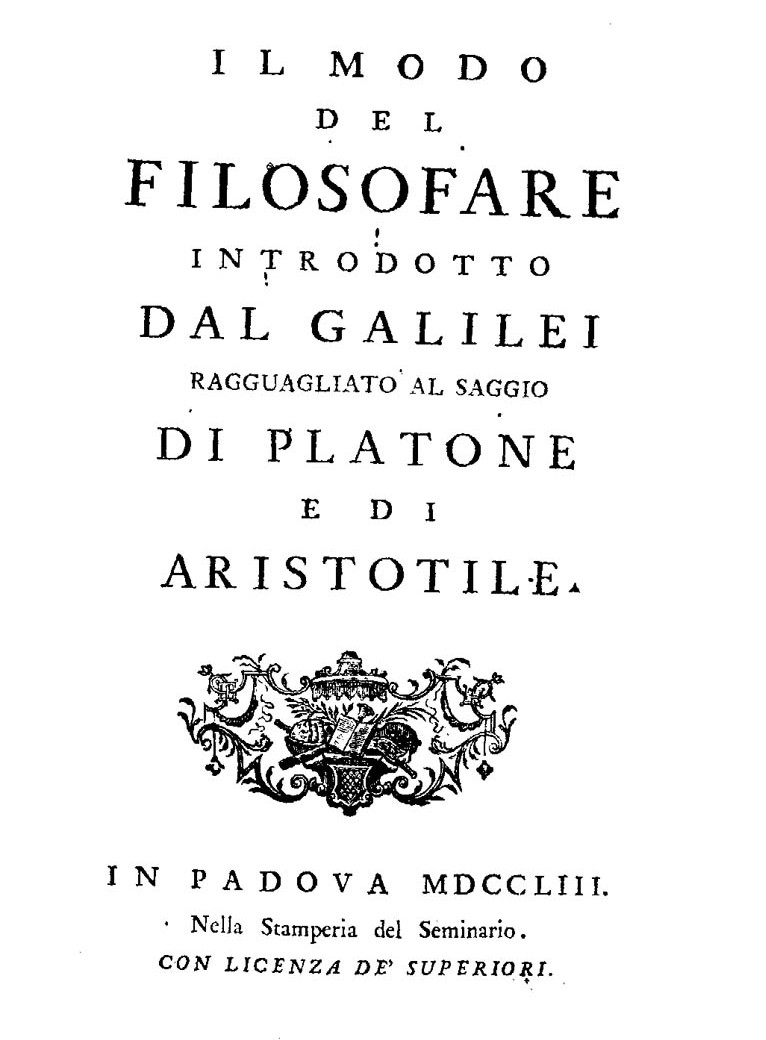
Il modo del filosofare introdotto dal Galilei (1753)

== Life ==
Bressani was born in Treviso. At the age of 16, he entered the seminary of Ceneda, and became a priest. He graduated from the University of Padua studying literature and philosophy. He was a dear friend of Francesco Algarotti although they had very different opinions. Bressani opposed Galilei and Newton theories in favor of a more scholastic approach. He died in Padua.

== Works ==
- Il modo del filosofare introdotto dal Galilei, ragguagliato al saggio di Platone e di Aristotile (in Italian). Padua: Tipografia del Seminario. 1753.
- Discorsi sopra le obbiezioni fatte dal Galileo alla dottrina di Aristotile (in Italian). Padua: Angelo Comino. 1760.
