= St. Elizabeth Catholic High School =

Catholic high school in Thornhill, Canada

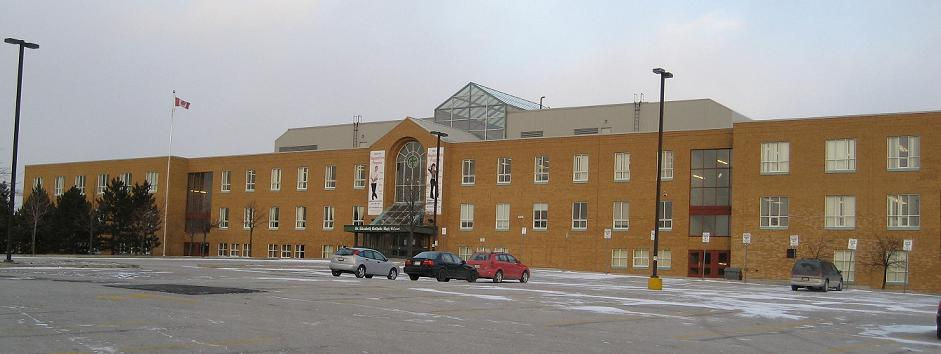

Location
- 525 New Westminster Drive; Thornhill, Ontario, L4J 7X3; Canada; 43.80366°N 79.45573°W

Information
- School type: Catholic High school
- Religious affiliation: Roman Catholic
- Founded: 1987
- School board: York Catholic District School Board
- Superintendent: Jennifer Sarna
- Area trustee: Jennifer Wingston
- Principal: Martina Fasano
- Grades: 9-12
- Enrolment: 1334 (October 2020)
- Language: English,
- Colours: Black, white and red
- Mascot: Pedro the Panther
- Team name: Panthers
- Website: seh.ycdsb.ca

St. Elizabeth Catholic High School is a high school in Thornhill, Ontario, Canada. St. Elizabeth CHS was founded by the York Catholic District School Board in 1987, celebrating its 20th anniversary in 2007. St. Elizabeth is the home of Regional Arts Program for drama, dance, visual arts, and music students in York Region. The enrollment averages between 1300 and 1500 students per school year.

In the beginning, St. Elizabeth consisted of (and was only open to) grade nine students. However, the school added the tenth grade for the 1988–1989 school year and the eleventh grade for the remainder of 1989. Due to the overpopulation of school enrolment, a change of site was announced and the current location began construction in 1988. Once completed in January 1990, it was officially opened to students and staff in February 1990. The high school's original location (at 21 Mullen Drive in Thornhill) was changed to Holy Family Catholic School, and officially opened in September 1990.

== Feeder schools ==
- Blessed Scalabrini (Bishop Scalabrini)
- Our Lady of the Rosary
- Father John Kelly
- Our Lady of Peace
- St. Joseph the Worker
- Blessed Trinity
- St. Cecilia

== Notable alumni ==
- Anthony Adur – soccer player
- Paula Brancati – actress
- Luke Bilyk – actor
- Christopher Morales-Williams – athlete
- Amanda Cupido - podcast producer
- Nicolina Bozzo – singer

== See also ==
- Education in Ontario
- List of secondary schools in Ontario
