= St. Robert Catholic High School =

Coordinates: 43°49′56″N 79°22′44″W

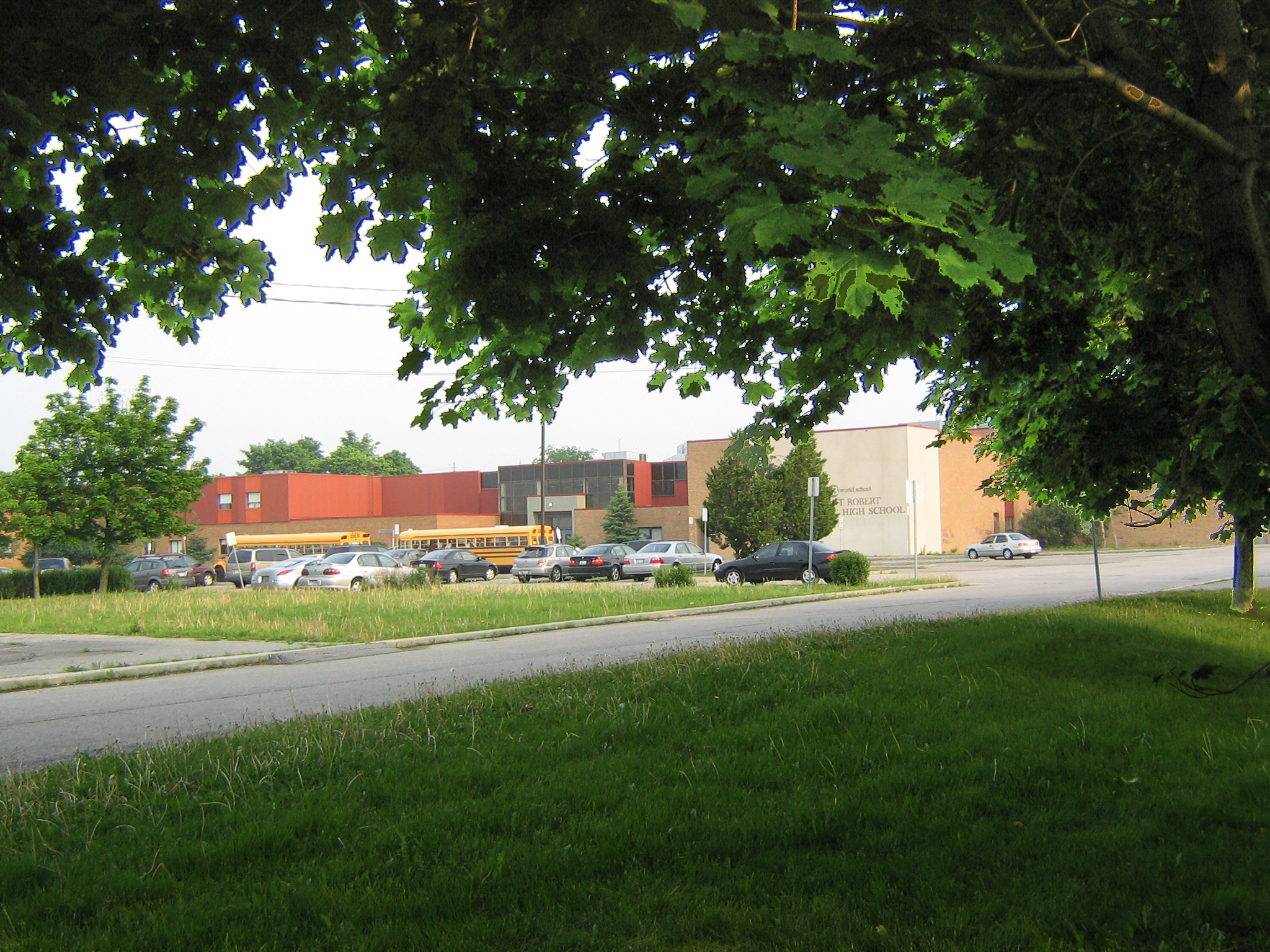

Location
- 8101 Leslie Street; Thornhill, Ontario, 100 25300; Canada

Information
- School type: High school International Baccalaureate World School
- Motto: Knowledge is the Beginning
- Religious affiliation: Roman Catholic
- Founded: 1975
- School board: York Catholic District School Board
- Superintendent: Joel Chiutsi
- Area trustee: Carol Cotton
- Principal: Elaine Dharmai
- Grades: 9-12
- Enrolment: 1681 (2023)
- Language: English, French
- Colours: Forest Green, White and Black
- Mascot: Ram
- Nickname: St. Robs, STR
- Newspaper: The Axiom, La Silhouette (French newspaper)
- Website: stro.ycdsb.ca
- Last updated: December 2024

St. Robert Catholic High School is a secondary school in Markham-Thornhill, Ontario, Canada.

== History ==
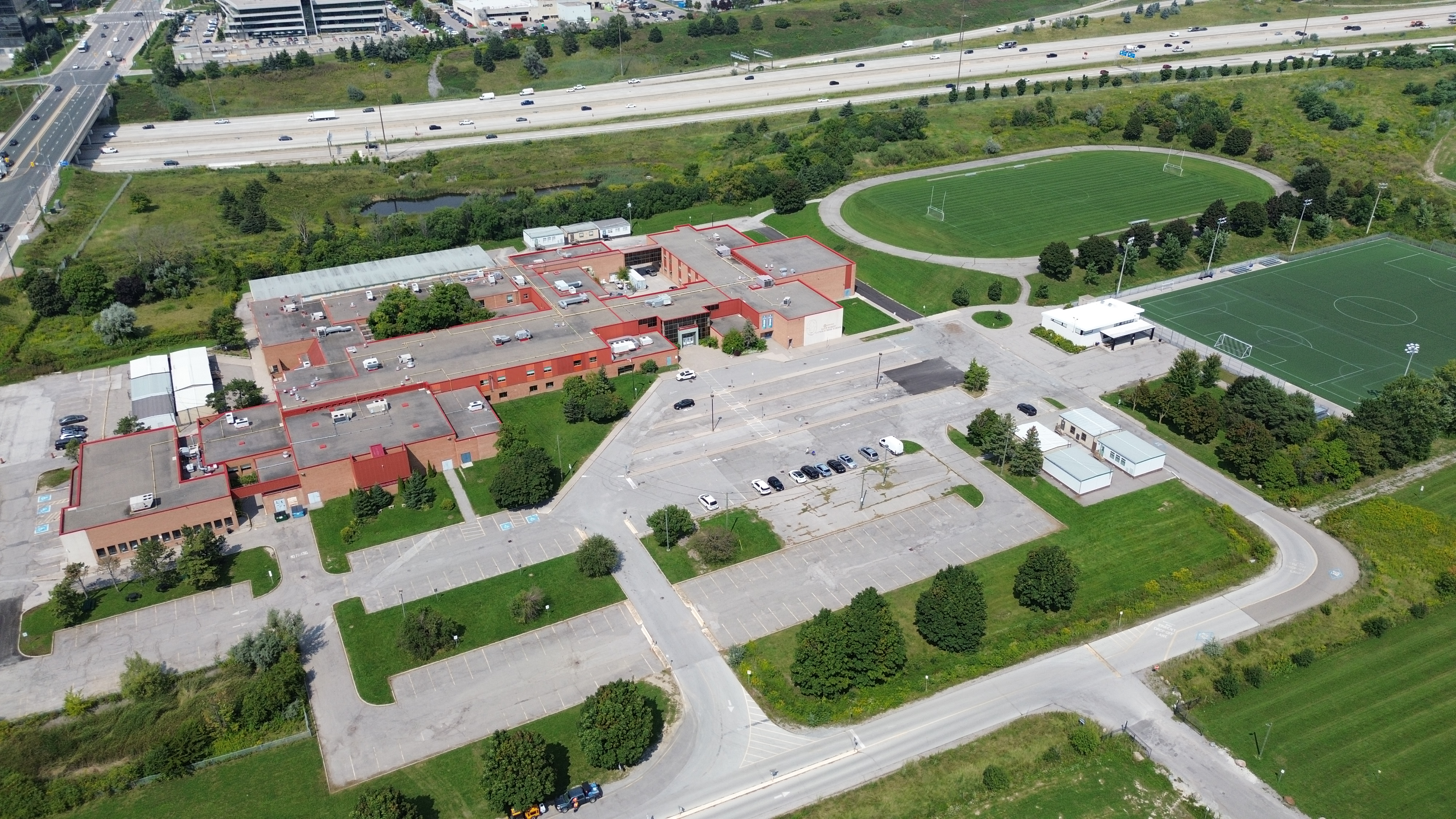
The school campus.

St. Robert CHS was opened by the York Catholic District School Board in 1975. It is named after its patron saint, St. Robert Bellarmine. The extension added in January 1989 completed the school as it stands today. A $3.5 million indoor artificial turf soccer field adjacent to the main parking lot was completed in 2010.

Between 2013 and 2016, Paul Paterson, then vice principal at St. Robert Catholic High School in Thornhill, Ontario, was accused of developing an inappropriate relationship with a male student. Allegations included that he allowed the student to stay overnight at his home, shared alcohol and marijuana with him, and slept in the same bed. Additional complaints from other students suggested similar boundary violations, including inappropriate comments and physical contact.

Following a criminal investigation, Paterson was charged with sexual assault and related offences. In mid-October 2017, a court in Newmarket, Ontario, acquitted Paterson of all criminal charges, finding him not guilty of sexual misconduct. However, in a separate proceeding, the Ontario College of Teachers found him guilty of professional misconduct and revoked his teaching licence, also ordering him to pay a $5,000 penalty.

== School rankings ==
St. Robert CHS is consistently ranked as the top secondary schools in Ontario according to the Fraser Institute. In the 2024 Report Card on Ontario's Secondary Schools, the school scored a perfect 10 out of 10, ranking 1st out of 742 schools, an improvement from the 2023 report's score of 9.2 (4th of 689). The five-year average ranking places it second in Ontario, trailing only Ursula Franklin Academy in Toronto. This school is deemed the most sought after public Catholic high school in Ontario and places among the most desired high schools in all of Canada.

St. Robert CHS received high placements in the University of Waterloo's Euclid Mathematics Contest, placing 1st in 2025,

== Notable alumni ==
- Frank Dukes, record producer
- Marco Bruno, record producer
- Tanisha Scott, choreographer
- Paul McGuire, television host

== See also ==
- Education in Ontario
- List of secondary schools in Ontario
- International Baccalaureate
- York Catholic District School Board
