= Holy Cross Catholic Academy =

Location
- 7501 Martin Grove Road; Woodbridge, Ontario, L4L 1A5; Canada; 43°46′9″N 79°36′28″W

Information
- School type: Catholic
- Motto: "Sharing The Future"
- Religious affiliation: Roman Catholic
- Founded: September 1986
- School board: York Catholic District School Board
- Superintendent: Tim Laliberte
- Area trustee: Michaela Barbieri
- School number: 720488
- Principal: Sandra Abate
- Vice Principals: Daniel Castronovo, Davide Lamonica, Nadia Pescador
- Grades: 9-12
- Enrolment: 1263 (October 2023)
- Colours: Navy and White
- Mascot: Marty the Hawk
- Team name: Hawks
- Website: hocr.ycdsb.ca

Holy Cross Catholic Academy (or Holy Cross) is a Catholic high school. It was first established in September 1986 to serve western Woodbridge, a community in Vaughan, Ontario, Canada. The school serves grades nine through twelve (ages 14 – 18).

== Programs ==
Holy Cross offers various student programs such as the High Performer Athlete Program (HPA), and Specialist High School Majors (SHSM) in the areas of Arts and Culture, Health and Wellness, and Business.

== Notable alumni ==
- Frank Corrado, NHL hockey player; played for both the Vancouver Canucks and Toronto Maple Leafs
- Steve Eminger, NHL hockey player; played for the New York Rangers
- Marco Reda, professional soccer player; played for Toronto FC
- Malik Owolabi-Belewu, professional soccer player; plays for Forge FC
- Carson Rehkopf, NHL hockey player; under contract for the Seattle Kraken
- Ivan Pavela, professional soccer player; plays for Inter Toronto FC
- Shola Jimoh, professional soccer player; plays for Inter Toronto FC and the Canada men's national soccer team

== See also ==
- Education in Ontario
- List of secondary schools in Ontario
- York Catholic District School Board
- Woodbridge, Ontario
