= Markville =

Markville may refer to:

- Markville Shopping Centre
- Arna Township, Pine County, Minnesota
- Markville Secondary School
- Raymerville – Markville East, Ontario
