= Raymerville – Markville East =

Raymerville - Markville East
- Community
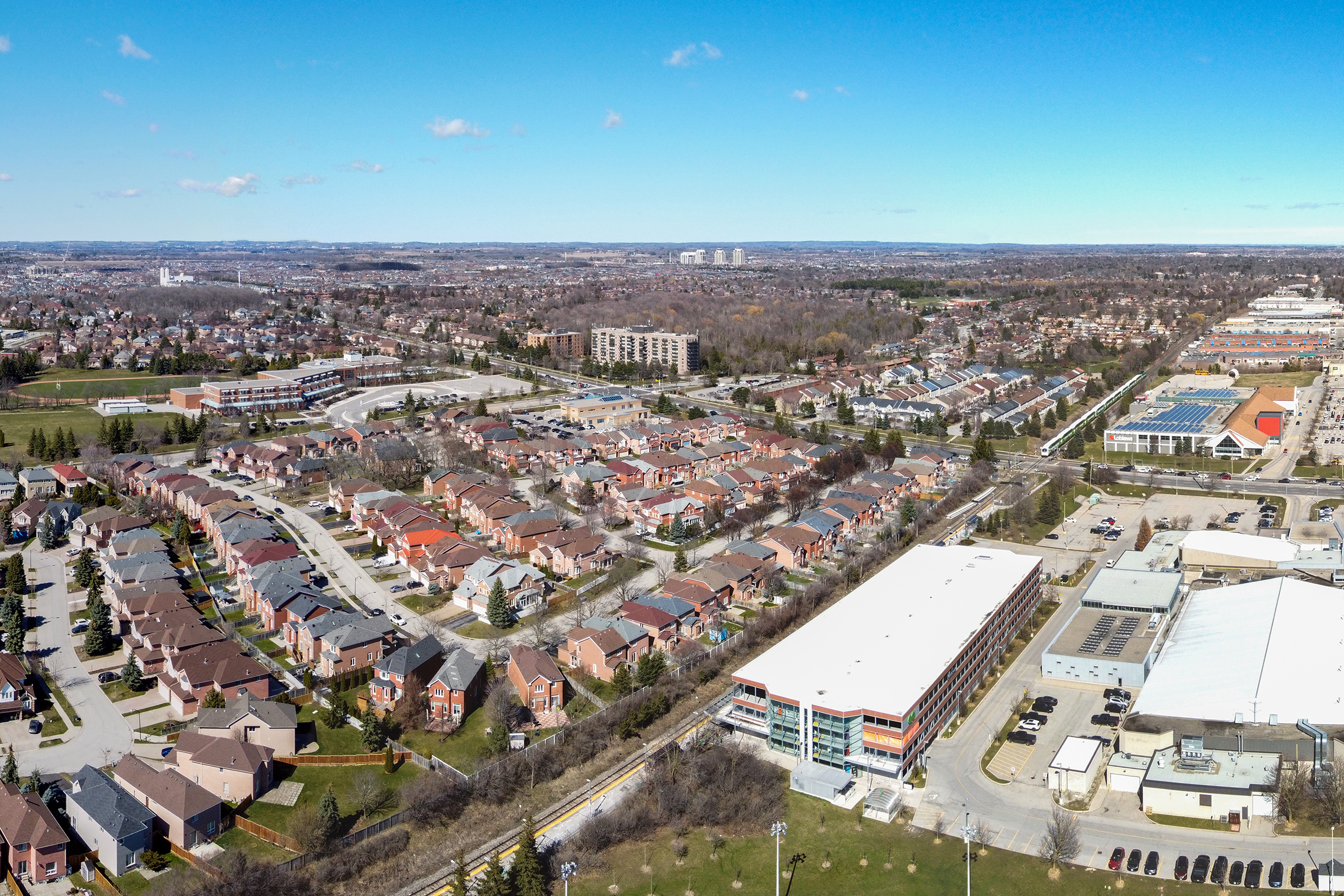
- Aerial view of Raymerville – Markville East in 2024

- Location within York
- Coordinates: 43°52′56″N 79°16′38″W
- Country: Canada
- Province: Ontario
- Regional Municipality: York
- City: Markham

Area
  - Total: 2.52 km^{2} (0.97 sq mi)

Population (2006) Census Tract Number 5350400.03 / 5350400.12
  - Total: 10,562
  - Density: 4,191.27/km^{2} (10,855.3/sq mi)
- Time zone: UTC-5 (EST)
  - Summer (DST): UTC-4 (EDT)

Raymerville - Markville East (2006 population 10,562) (Census Tract No. 5350400.03 and 5350400.12) is a community in Markham, Ontario, Canada. The name "Raymerville" came from the community's major collector road, Raymerville Drive. The name "Markville" came from the local major shopping mall, Markville Shopping Centre. The community is referred to as "Markville East" because it is located immediately east of Markville Shopping Centre.

It is also one of the very few communities in Markham that has a declined population when compared to the population in the 2001 census.

== Demography ==
For areas west of Springdale Park,

Canada census – Raymerville – Markville East community profile

Population
Land area
Population density
Median age
Private dwellings
Median household income

For areas east of Springdale Park,

Canada census – Raymerville – Markville East community profile

Population
Land area
Population density
Median age
Private dwellings
Median household income

== History ==
The first family who settled in the area was the Raymer family. They farmed the land around the school built in 1986 known as Ramer Wood Public School which was named after them. From this, the naming of the street "Raymerville Drive" came to be.

The land is known for the Neilson milk company (formerly Nelson).

== Boundaries ==
The northern boundary of the community is located at 16th Avenue. The southern boundary is at Bullock Drive. Its western boundary is at McCowan Road. The eastern boundary is at Robinson river.

== Education ==
This region is home to Ramer Wood Public School and Saint Edwards Catholic School. Although there are no secondary schools in the area, students in Raymerville - Markville East generally attend either Markville Secondary School or Brother Andre Catholic High School.

== Transportation ==
=== Public transit ===
The area is serviced by York Region Transit (YRT) Route 41 Markham Local, Route 45 Mingay and Route 301 Markham Express, providing easy access to Finch GO Bus Terminal. Centennial and Markham GO Stations serve the community, though geographically they are not located within the community's boundaries. Also the community is serviced on the boundary by Route 129A McCowan Road North and Route 85 16th Ave.

=== Raymerville Drive ===
Raymerville Drive
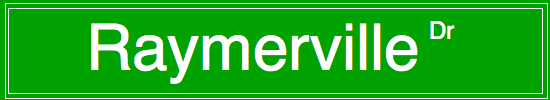
- Interactive map of Raymerville Drive
- Length: 4.5 km (2.8 mi)
- Location: Carlton Road to Manhattan Drive

Raymerville Drive is a major collector contour-shaped road that forms the backbone of the community. Most of the community residents rely on Raymerville Drive to get them to major arterial roads such as McCowan Road and Main Street Markham.

Raymerville Drive forms an U-shape, spanning across the community's eastern end to its western end. The road connects to Carlton Road on its southwestern end, and Manhattan Drive on its northwestern end. The Carlton-Raymerville corridor is one of the most important road corridors in Markham as this corridor spans large portions of the city, including the communities of Unionville and Raymerville - Markville East, and consequently, serves a large population within the city. The area's residential character and proximity to key transit routes make it a notable part of Markham's real estate landscape.

Raymerville Drive has two lanes throughout its entire route, and is part of the Neighbourhood Traffic Calming Zone program. The program is put in effect to discourage heavy traffic utilizing the corridor to connect from McCowan Road to Main Street.

== Parks ==
The community is home to 4 parks: Raymerville Woodlot Park, Raybeck Park, Springdale Park, and Stargell Park. In November 2010 the soccer field at Raybeck park has been under construction for a sprinkler system. Many of the community are upset that the city started construction on this project so close to winter. Construction was put on hold a week after started due to the first snowfall of the winter.

== Roads ==
Raymerville-Markville East consists mainly of suburban streets, many of which have speed humps, which is a part of Markham's plan to calm traffic. The main roads that connect the people that live in the community to the rest of Markham are Raymerville Drive and Cairns Drive. The roads in the community consists of Adrian Crescent, Beck Drive, Bendamere Crescent, Black Cherry Drive, Brookbank Court, Burwell Crescent, Crandall Drive, Graham Crescent, Hemlock Drive, Hickory Drive, Higginson Street, Mercer Crescent, Stargell Crescent, Strathmore Crescent, Sunway Square, Tunney Crescent, and White Ash Drive.
