= South Unionville =

South Unionville Village Green
- Neighbourhood
- South Unionville within Markham
- Coordinates: 43°51′39.08″N 79°17′32.26″W
- Country: Canada
- Province: Ontario
- Regional Municipality: York Region
- City: Markham

Area
  - Total: 2.24 km^{2} (0.86 sq mi)

Population (2011)
  - Total: 7,854
- Postal Code span: L3R

South Unionville is a neighbourhood located in, Markham, Ontario, Canada. It is bounded to the north by Highway 7, south by Highway 407, east by McCowan Road and west to about Kennedy Road. The community is named after its location south of the historic Unionville district.

A majority of developed parkland is found just north of South Unionville Avenue. South Unionville also has a large variation of mixed-income housing, most townhouses are found along South Unionville Avenue, Semi-detached houses south of the street and detached houses along other residential lanes. A condominium complex along with a shopping centre locates in the west end of the community. Construction on the newer parts of the community began in 2000 and was mostly finished by 2003. The local school is Unionville Meadows Public School.

== Population dynamics ==
South Unionville, like most other communities in Markham, has a diverse population. The Chinese and East Asian make up a large portion of the population heritage. Residents of South Unionville also include South Asian, Middle Eastern, European, African, and mixed heritage Canadian families.

Population and Dwelling Counts	South Unionville	Toronto (CMA)
Population in 2011	7,854	5,583,064
Population in 2006	6,686	5,113,149
2006 to 2011 population change (%)	17.5	9.2
Total Private Dwellings	2,187	2,079,459
Population Density (Per km^{2})	3,503.9	945.4
Land Area (km^{2})	2.24	5905.71

== Parks ==
Although South Unionville is known for its lack of developed parkland, the neighbourhood does contain several woodlots. Because of this lack of Community Centers and recreational areas as a whole, there was heavy opposition from community groups when Primont Homes was to build 6 townhouses on a portion of undeveloped greenspace. Public meetings were held to discuss the issue.

=== South Unionville Pond Green ===
A large park that surrounds South Unionville Pond, at the heart of the community. The park includes benches, groves and a circular pathway that overlooks the pond itself. The park also includes a bridge and pathways that allow visitors to walk around the lake. During winter, ducks frequent the pond.

=== Bianca Park ===
A rectangular green-space located in the southwest of the community. Although a majority of Bianca Park is a large field it is bordered by trees and includes a playground with swings. The park is named after the street that borders its north; Bianca Drive.

=== Unionville Meadows Park ===
A large park, in the south of the Union Meadows Public School that is used most. Park contains a large playground, a splash pool and a circular walkway. The park also has a dual soccer field in its east end.

=== Ray Street Park ===
A large park, bordered between Ian Baron Ave and South Unionville Ave, and Unity Gardens Dr N and Ray Street, opened in 2014. The park contains a large variety of facilities including basketball court, a splash pool, two playgrounds for age 5-12 and age 5 or under, a kids rock climbing fixture and also an obstacle course designated for cycling or roller skate.

=== Other Parks ===
Avoca Park Located in the older, northern area of the community.

== Local institutions ==
There is one church and a school in South Unionville. A Kingdom Hall of Jehovah's Witnesses serving the community and other parts of Unionville is located across McCowan Avenue.

=== Unionville Meadows Public School ===
355 South Unionville Ave. The community elementary school for South Unionville that teaches from Jk to Grade 8. Although built only in 2003, is considerably young compared to other local schools. The school has 200- 300 students.

=== Hope Bible Church Markham ===
Formerly 'Harvest Bible Chapel York Region', Hope Bible Church Markham is a bible-believing church with a mission to glorify God through the fulfillment of the Great Commission in the spirit of the Great Commandment (Matthew 28:19-20).

It currently offers two services every weekend (Sunday morning at 9 and 11am) with child care for babies up to 18 months old and children ministry for toddlers through Grade 5.

=== Kingdom Hall of Jehovah's Witnesses. ===
Three meetings are held in English, one in Mandarin and one in Cantonese each week and is a base for public witnessing of Bible truths to the local communities.

== Shopping Centres ==
The Mall at Langham Square (朗豪坊) (formerly known as South Unionville Square) is well located with direct public transit and ready access to Highways 7 and 407, and focuses on the South-East community. With its T&T Supermarket and Asian themed retail mall, professional offices, commercial retail, restaurants and residential, it provides a venue for living, working, shopping and entertainment. Across the road, the Peachtree Center has additional Chinese cuisines restaurants, and small shops.

== Politics ==
South Unionville is currently a part of the following districts:

Ward 3, represented by Councilor Reid McAlpine

Markham-Unionville, provincial electoral riding, represented by Billy Pang (Conservative)

Markham-Unionville, federal electoral riding, represented by Michael Ma (Liberal)
