= Main Street Unionville =

Street in Markham, Ontario, Canada

Coordinates: 43.86585°N 79.31093°W

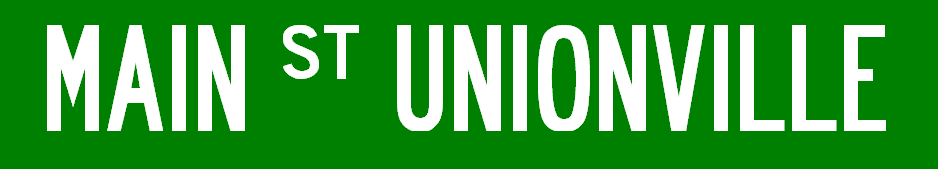
- (Main Street)
- Main Street Unionville is shown in red
- Interactive map of Main Street Unionville
- Length: 2.75 km (1.71 mi)
- Location: Markham; York
- South end: Enterprise Drive / Unionville Gate
- Major junctions: Highway 7
- North end: Rosemary Close

Construction
- Inauguration: 1840

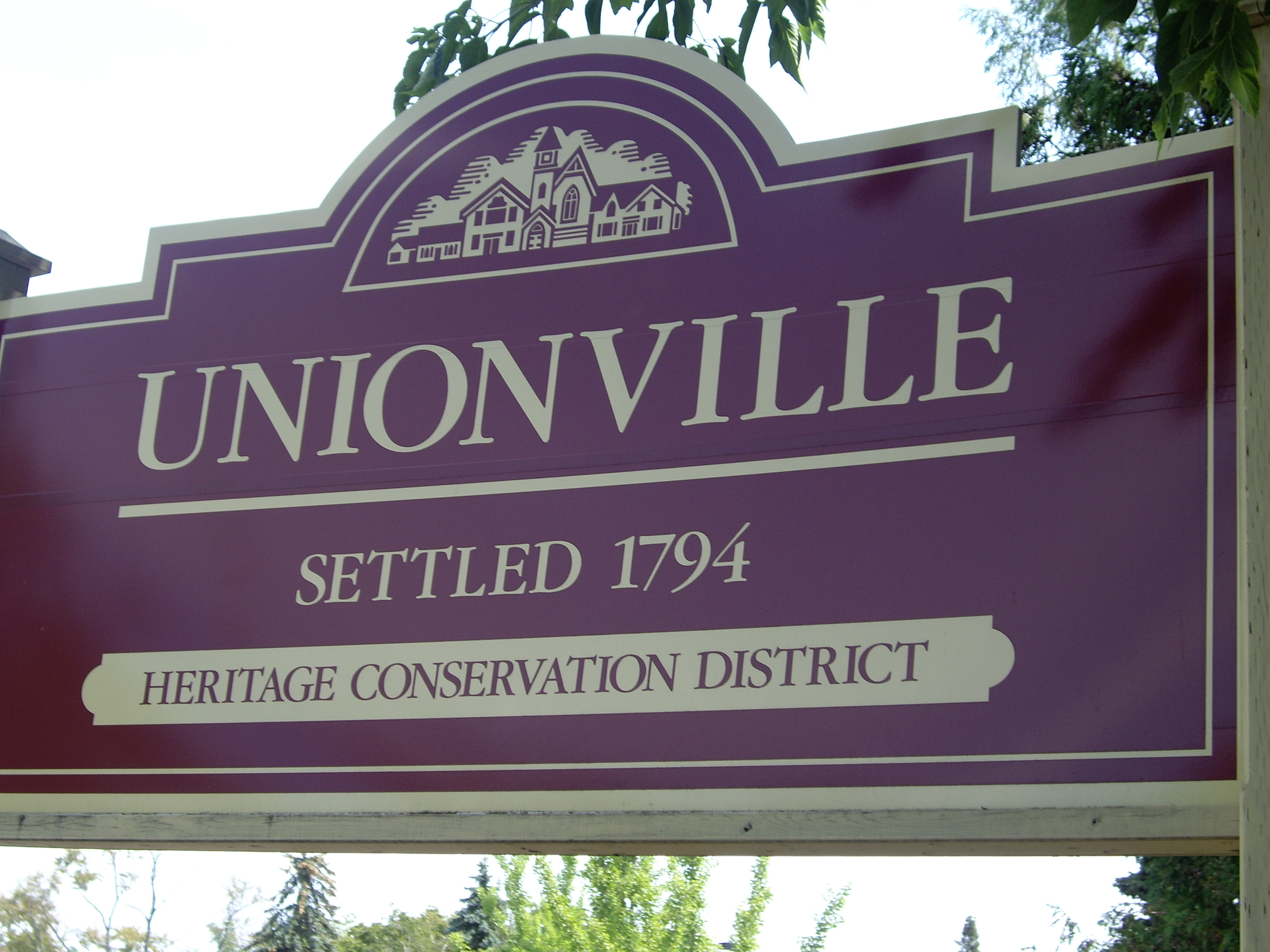
Unionville's Welcome Sign found near the street's intersection with Fred Varley Drive.

Main Street Unionville is a collector route that runs through the historical suburban community of Unionville, in Markham, Ontario, Canada. Like most other Main Streets, the street serves as an important road for local tourism development. All along the road, the street has structures that are virtually unchanged from its founding in 1794. Renowned for its pubs, parks, restaurants, and its historical European view, the road also hosts the annual Unionville Festival, which draws several thousand visitors to the neighbourhood.

== Road Information ==
- Local name: Main Street
- Attractions: Historic Village of Unionville, Varley Gallery, Starks Barber Company
- Road Status: From Unionville Gate to Carlton Road, the road is a paved 2-lane avenue, with a speed limit of 40 km/h. However, the right lane is often blocked due to parked vehicles left by tourists. North of Carlton Road, the road is a paved, two-lane street.
- Zonings: Mainly commercial and parklands, with residential zonings from 1794.

== History ==
=== Entertainment ===
Main Street Unionville hosts annual jazz and Celtic festivals, as well as live music in the bandstand in the summer. The street was also used as a stand-in for fictional Connecticut town Stars Hollow during the first season of The WB's Gilmore Girls television show. Other productions to have used Main Street as a filming location include The Scream Team in 2002, and Secrets of Eden in 2011.

The 1994 John Carpenter film, In the Mouth of Madness prominently features the northernmost part of the street as a stand-in for a fictional New England town, especially the exterior of the Unionville Arms Pub.

=== Road History ===
Main Street Unionville was the original 6th line of Markham Township. This road was undeveloped until about 1840 when the mill was developed at what is now Carlton Road. The mill needed the water from the pond to the north-west but the swamp to its immediate south made travel virtually impossible. The common road developed along the ridge to the south, and this became the main passageway. About this time the area on the north-west corner of the road and 15th Avenue (later Highway 7, and now York Regional Road 7) was subdivided but undeveloped until the coming of the railway in 1872. Unionville, as the center of the township, had until the 1970s held the town offices. The development of the subdivision immediately to the west of the small town in the late 1960s, brought attention to the run down nature of the buildings in the business area. The provincial government, with support of the regional and township governments were prepared to widen the road, which would have meant the demolition of the buildings. A great furor arose, culminating the Unionville Annual Festival, whose original purpose was to bring attention to the situation and to raise funds to fight the widening. Quickly, local politicians came on board and the road widening was stopped. In the early 1980s, the bypass was built around Main Street Unionville to relieve the heavy traffic. The bypass became the new alignment for Kennedy Road, though it was named Unionville By-pass for a number of years at first, and the original line was renamed as Main Street Unionville. With the coming of change the buildings were revived and a unique Victorian Village atmosphere came into being.

== Landmarks ==
- Historical Village of Unionville
- Varley Art Gallery
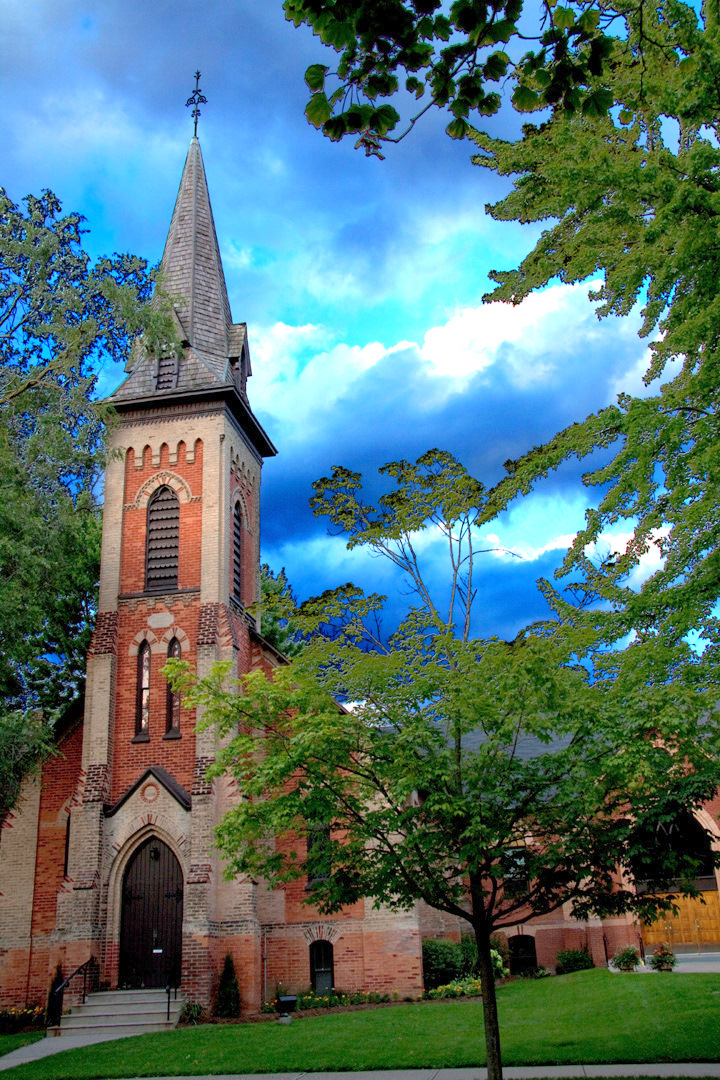
Central United Church

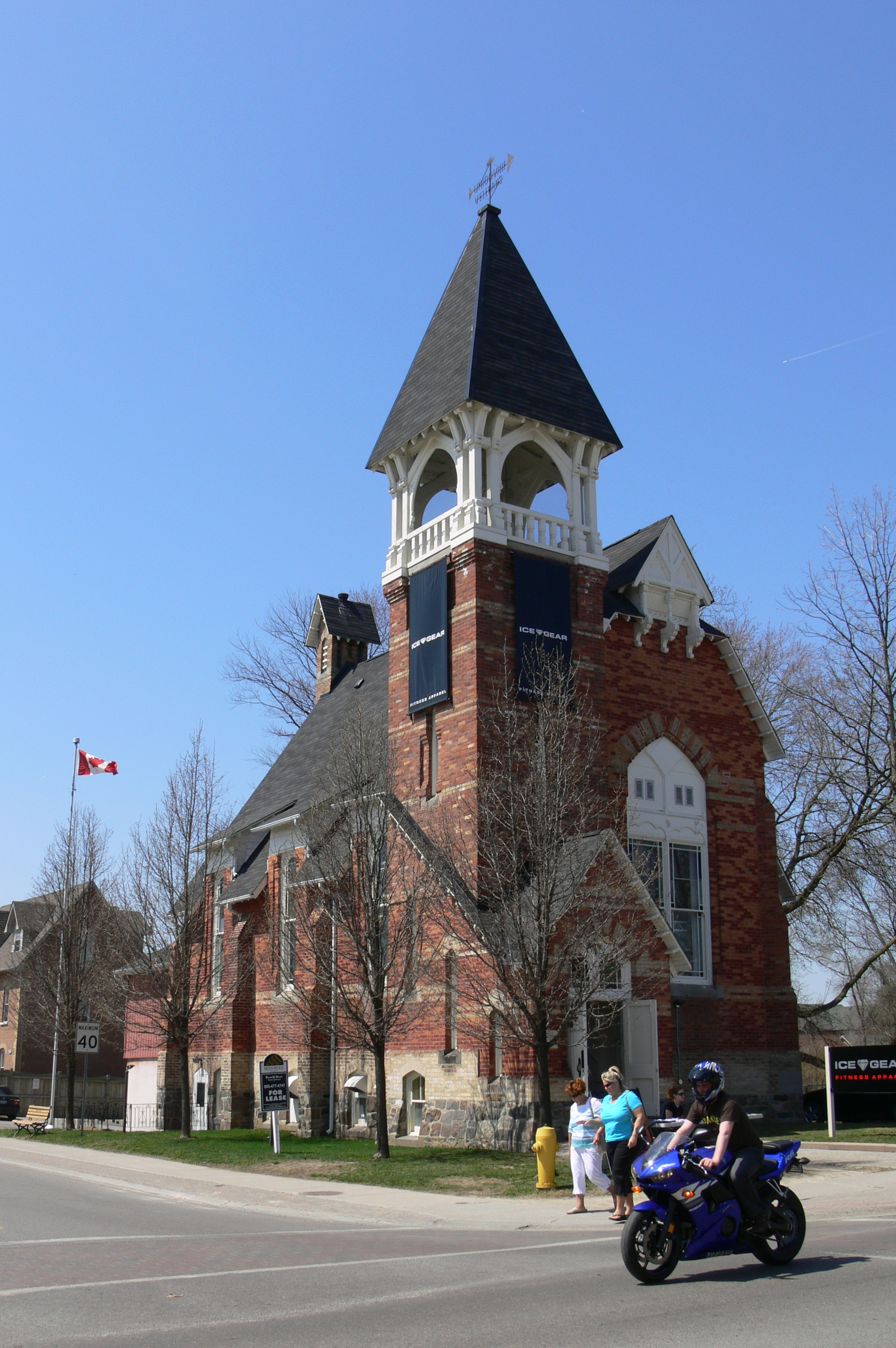
Old Unionville church, built by the architect of Casa Loma

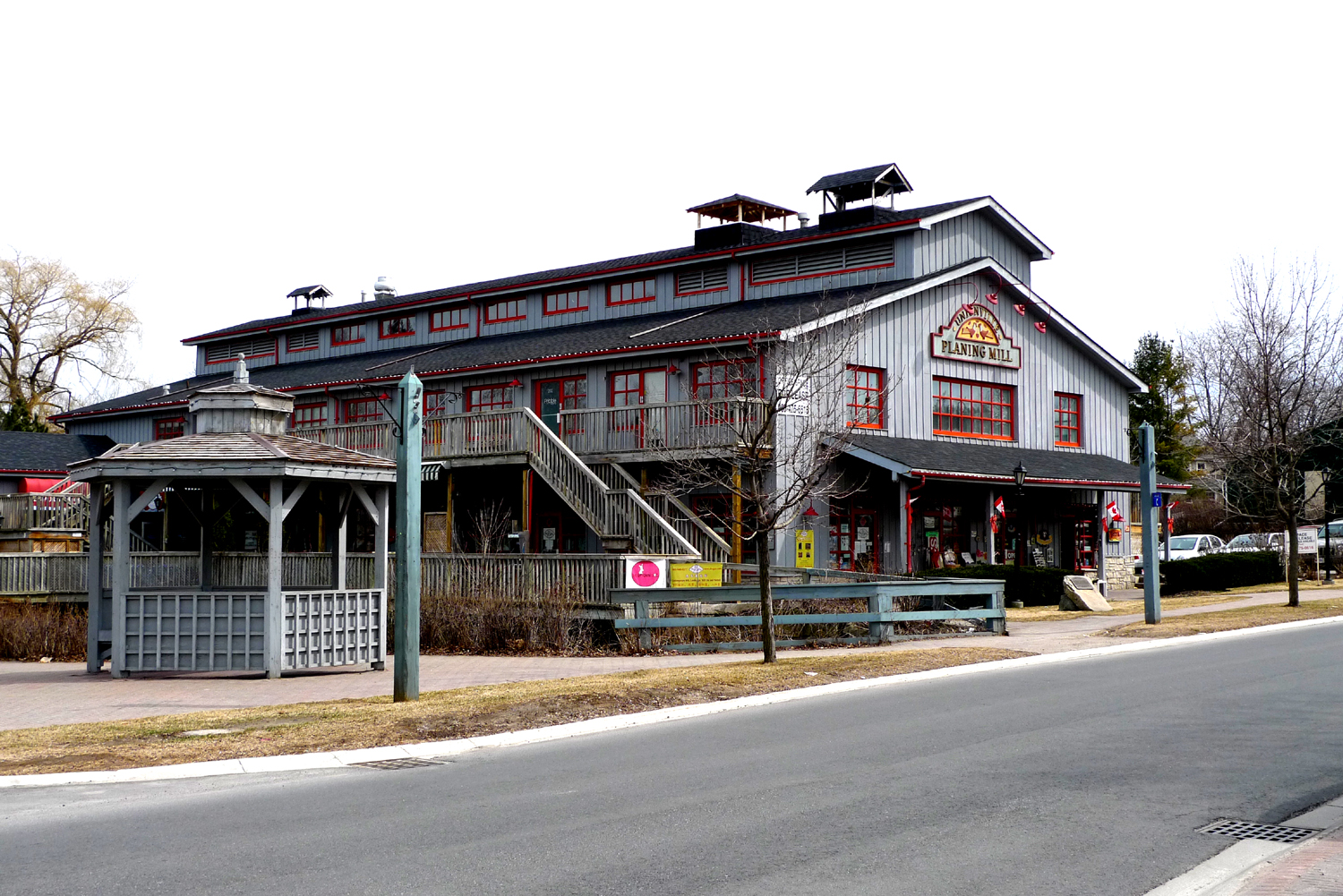
Unionville Planing Mill

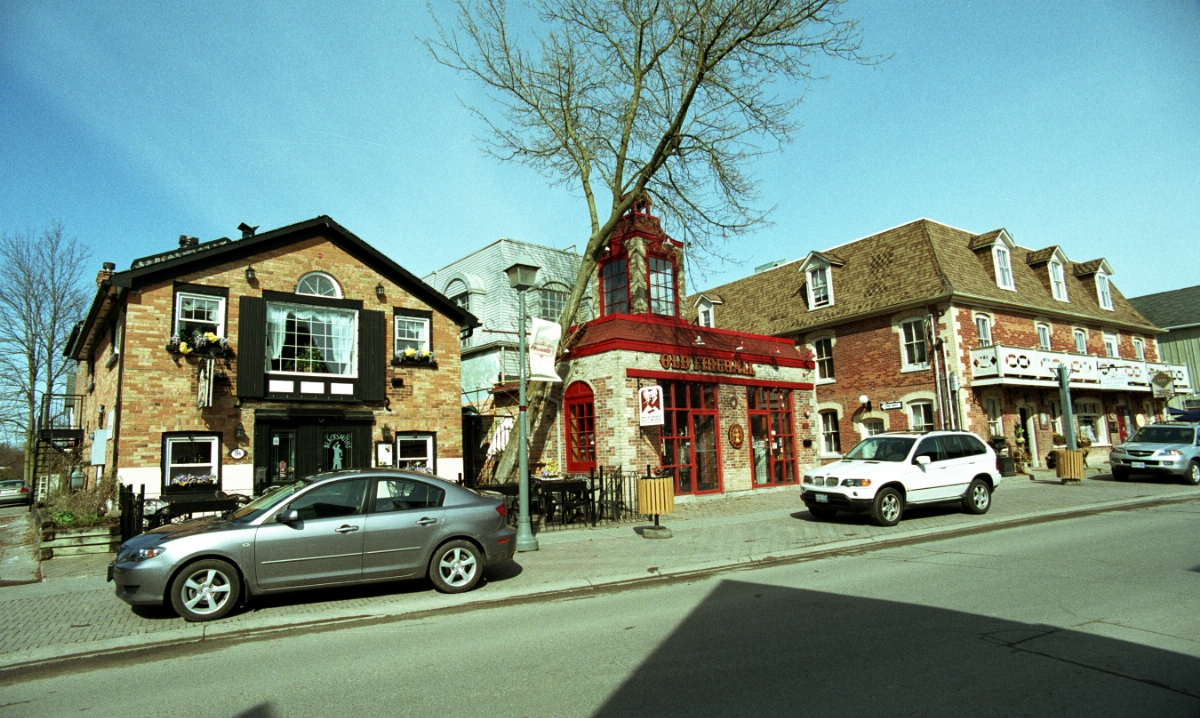
Unionville Main Street

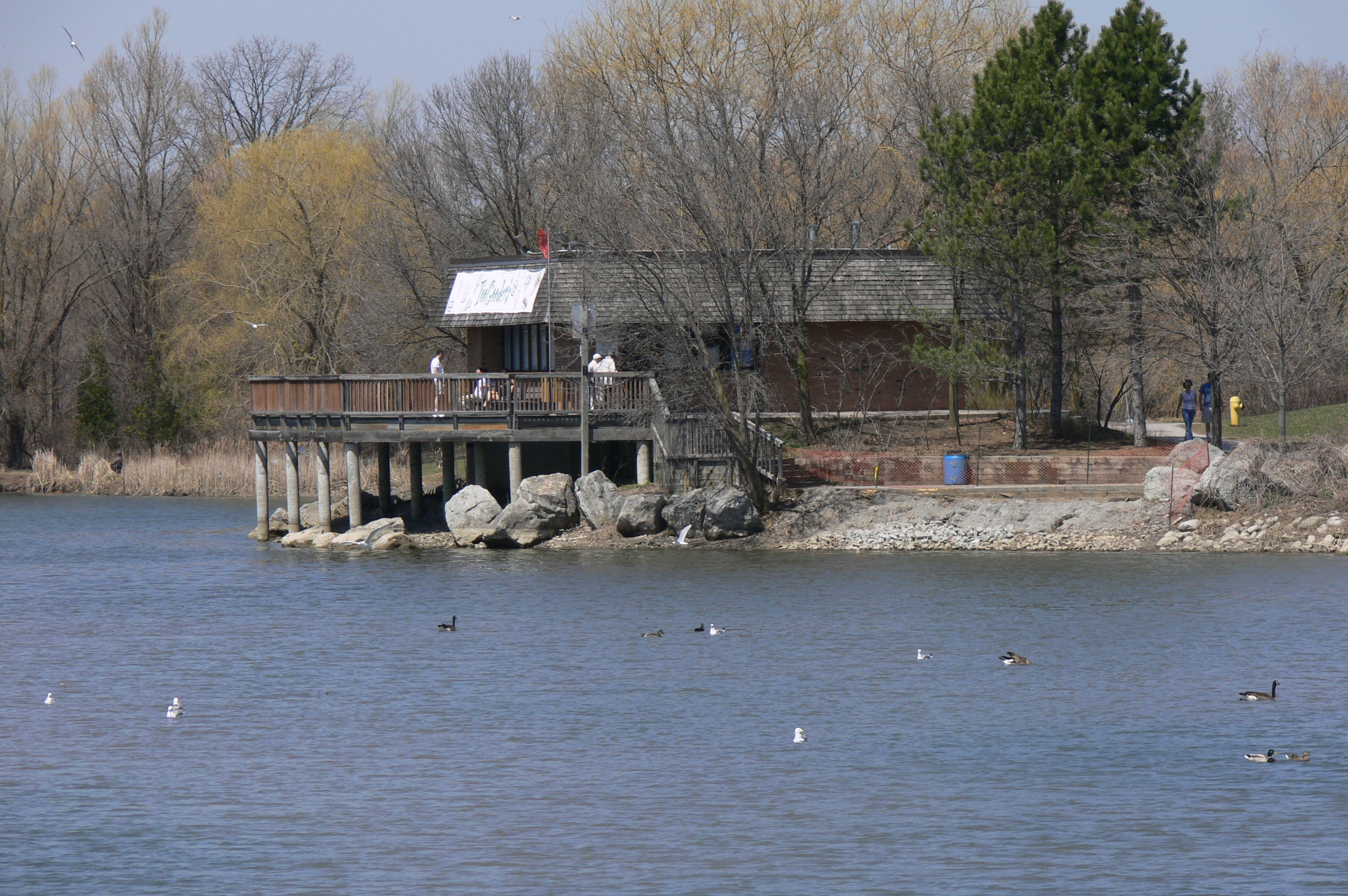
Toogood Pond

== Major intersections ==
The following table lists the major junctions along Main Street Unionville. The entire route is located in Markham, Ontario, within the Regional Municipality of York.

km	mi	Destinations	Notes
0.0	0.0	Cul-de-sac south of Enterprise Avenue	
0.2	0.12	Enterprise Avenue / Unionville Gate	Markham Pan Am Centre located southwest of intersection
0.8	0.50	Highway 7	
1.7	1.1	Carlton Road	
2.4	1.5	Rosemead Close	Exit of Fire Station north of intersection
1.000 mi = 1.609 km; 1.000 km = 0.621 mi
