= Toogood Pond Park =

Park in Ontario, Canada

Coordinates: 43.87428°N 79.31805°W

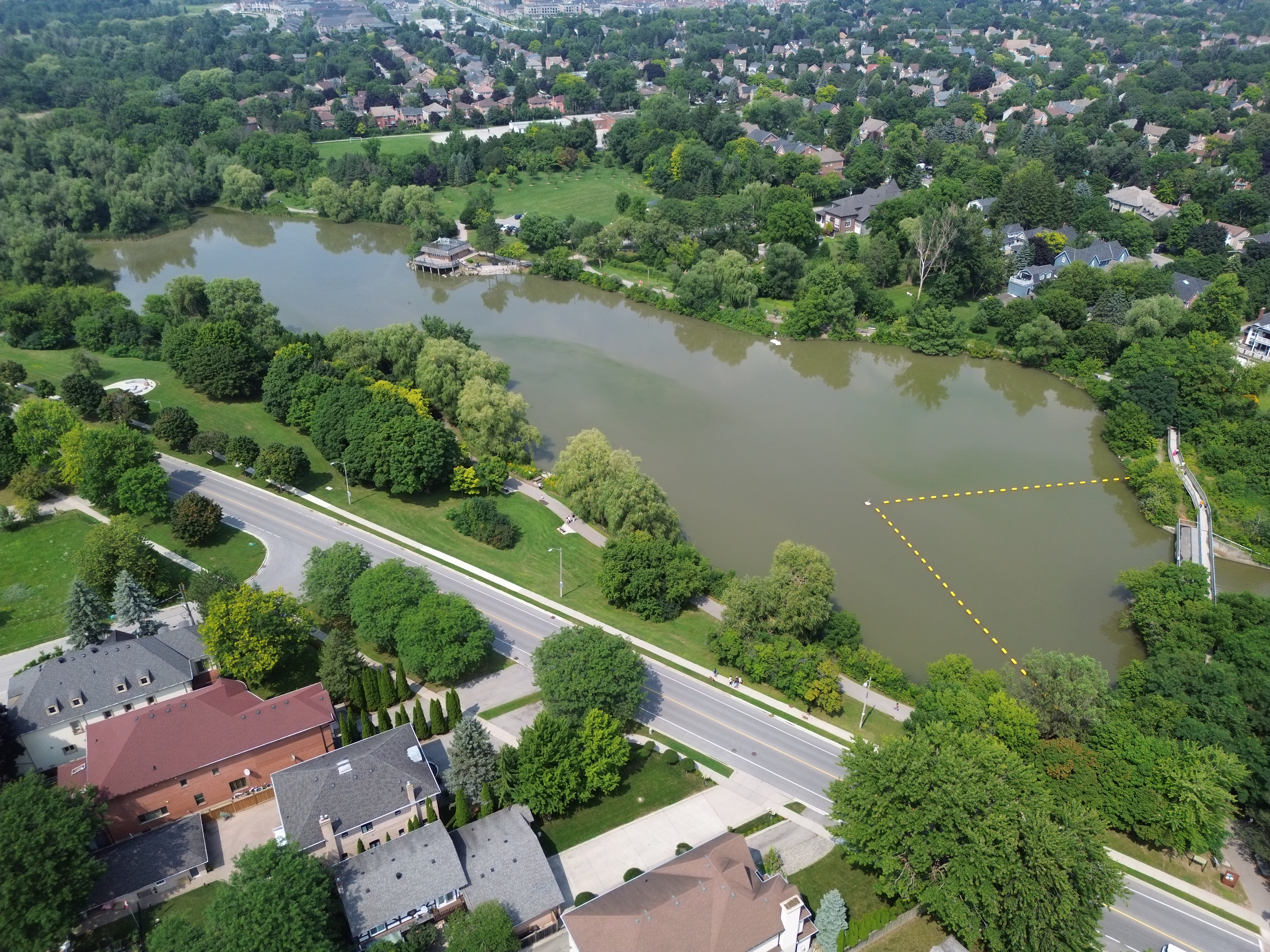
Aerial view of Toogood Pond.

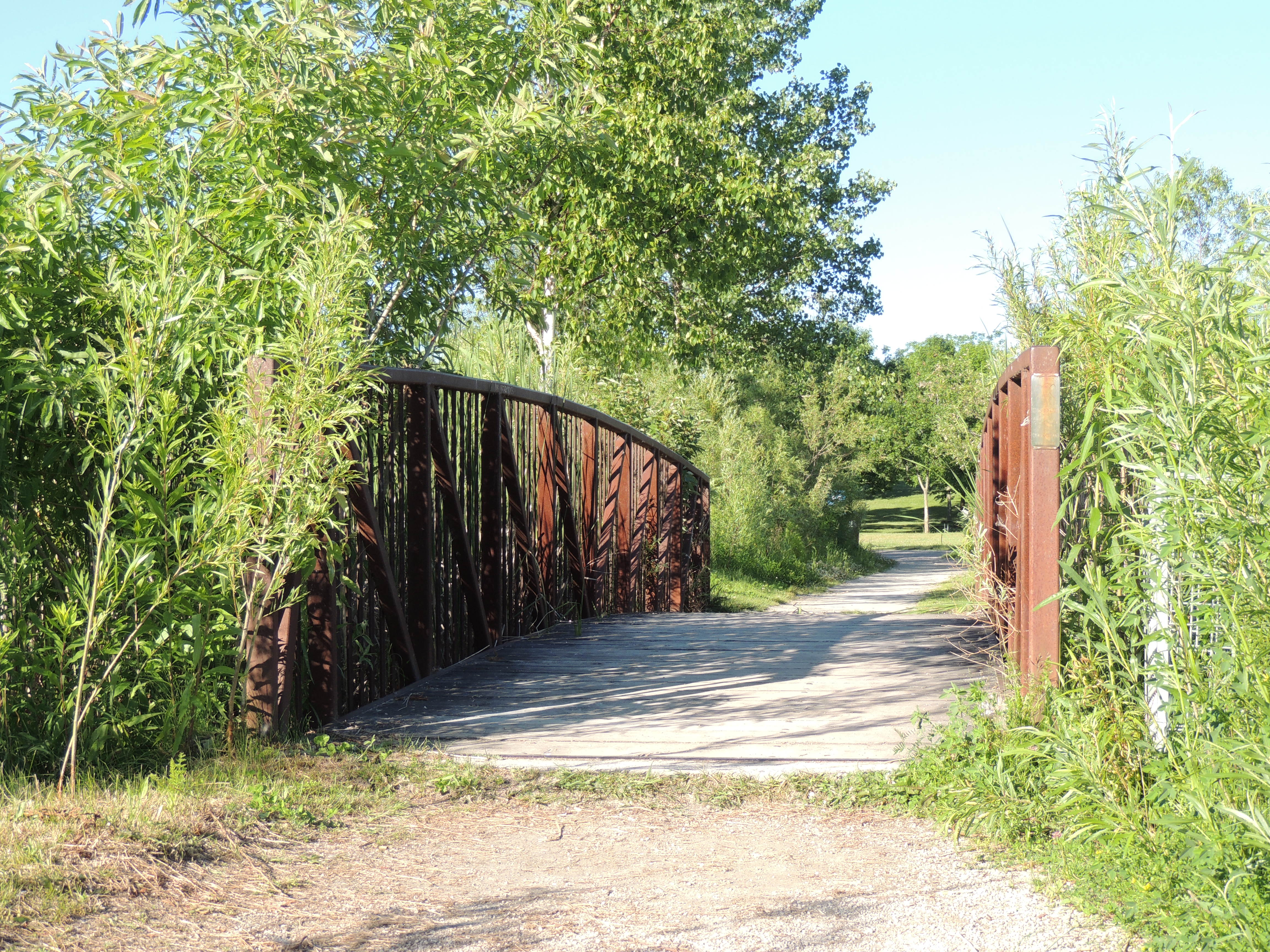
A view of a bridge in Toogood Pond Park.

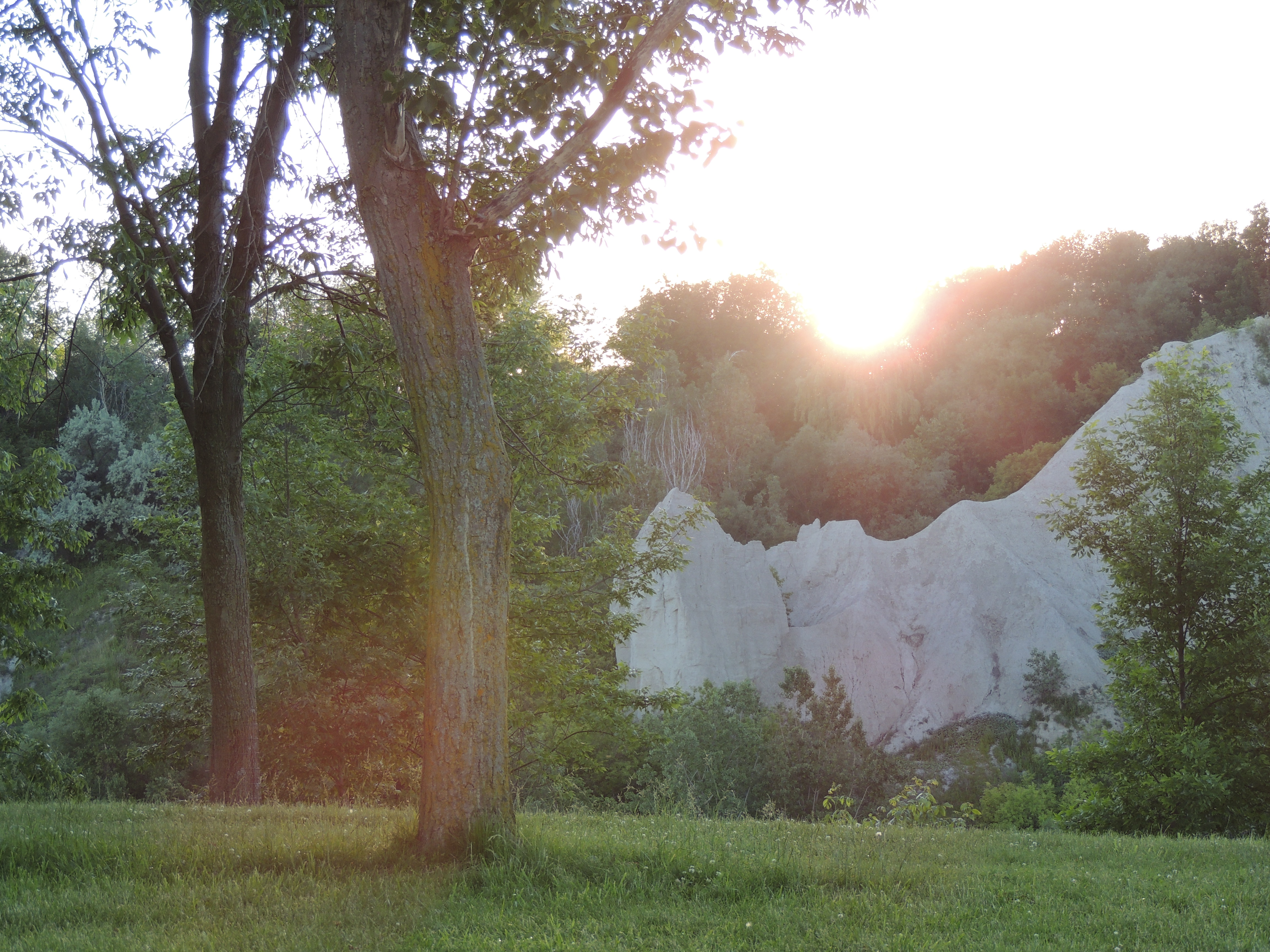
Several rocky hills can be found in the park, as shown in this photo.

Toogood Pond Park is a 33.3-hectare park located in the neighbourhood of Unionville, in Markham, Ontario, Canada that is best known for Toogood Pond. The pond is home to many Canada geese, ducks, fish, and plants. The park is owned and operated by the Corporation of the City of Markham, and is maintained by the city's Parks Department.

== History ==
At the intersection of Carlton Road and Main Street Unionville, a flour mill, the Union Grist Mill, was built at around 1840. Toogood Pond, earlier named Willow Lake and often referred to only as "the pond", was formed when a dam was placed across Bruce Creek, a tributary of the Rouge River, to make a mill race to provide water to power a flat mill wheel for the grist mill. In the 1930s, during a flash flood, the mill race was washed away, and the mill was destroyed by fire four years later in 1934 and never rebuilt.

The Toogood family bought the property around 1939 after moving from Alberta. In 1953, in response to Mr. Toogood's concern that children might drown while swimming in the pond, local service clubs established the Unionville Swimming Club, with the aim of providing supervised swimming and Red Cross swimming and water safety lessons.

In the 1980, the City of Markham acquired the property and the area now became Toogood Park.

== Plant species ==
- Black-eyed susan
- Giant hogweed
- Sumac
- Manitoba maple
- Norway maple
- Weeping willow
- Bull thistle
- Wild burdock
- Oxeye daisy
- Common milkweed
- Poison ivy
- Dog strangling vine
- Garlic mustard
- White ash
- Cattails

== Improvement projects ==
A Sediment Removal and Restoration project was recently undertaken, which included removing sediment, restoring the shoreline, and the planting of native plants species.

== Skating on the pond ==
Though many locals were accustomed to ice skating on the frozen pond during winter, Markham's city council voted to ban skating on the pond in late 2015 due to maintenance complications.

In 2016, Markham considered to hire an engineer to monitor the condition of ice on Toogood Pond. In November of that year, city council decided to not continue with the decision and announced that users of the park can skate at their own risk.

== See also ==
- Milne Dam and Reservoir - man-made lake created by flood control dam on Rouge River in Toronto
- Clairville, Reservoir - man-made lake created by flood control dam on Humber River in Toronto
- G. Lord Ross Dam and Reservoir - created by flood control dam along Don River in Toronto
