= Unionville, Ontario =

Unionville
- Suburban district
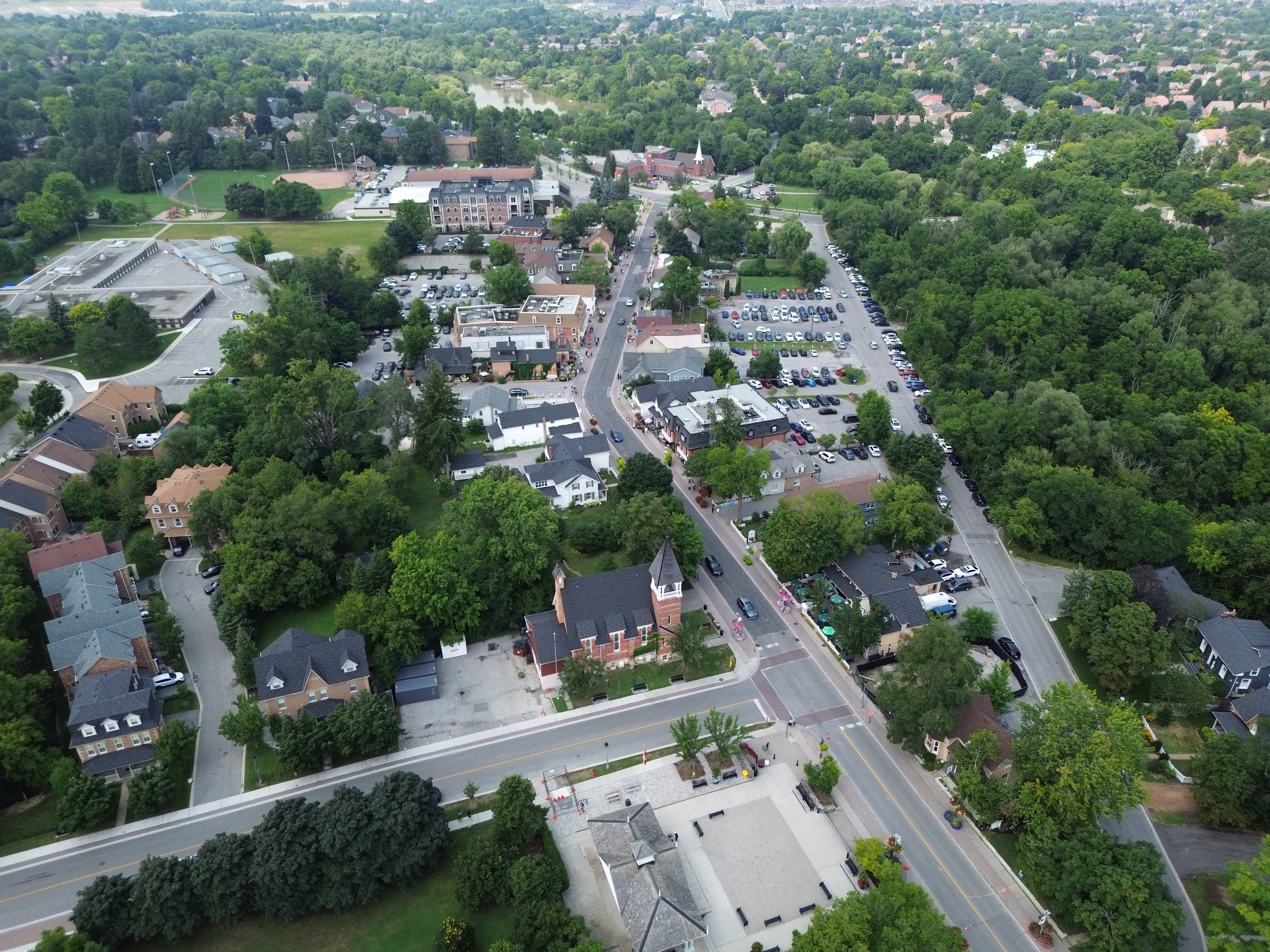
- Aerial view of old Unionville: Main Street Unionville (centre), Toogood Pond Park (top) and Crosby Park (top left)

- Unionville within Markham
- Coordinates: 43°51′53″N 79°18′37″W
- Country: Canada
- Province: Ontario
- Regional Municipality: York
- City: Markham
- Founded: 1794
- Incorporated: 1907? (Police village)
- Changed Municipality: 1971 York Region from York County
- Amalgamated: 1971 into Markham (as Town); 2012 (as City)

Government
  - Founder: William Berczy
  - MPs: Michael Ma (Markham—Unionville)
  - MPPs: Billy Pang (Markham—Unionville)
  - Councillors: Reid McAlpine (Ward 3); Karen Rea (Ward 4)*; Amanda Yeung Collucci (Ward 6)*; *Commonly considered Unionville, although the City of Markham designates Unionville as only within Ward 3
- Time zone: UTC-5 (EST)
  - Summer (DST): UTC−4 (EDT)
- Postal codes: L3P, L3R, L3S, L6B, L6C, L6E and L6G
- NTS Map: 030M14
- GNBC Code: FCYXB

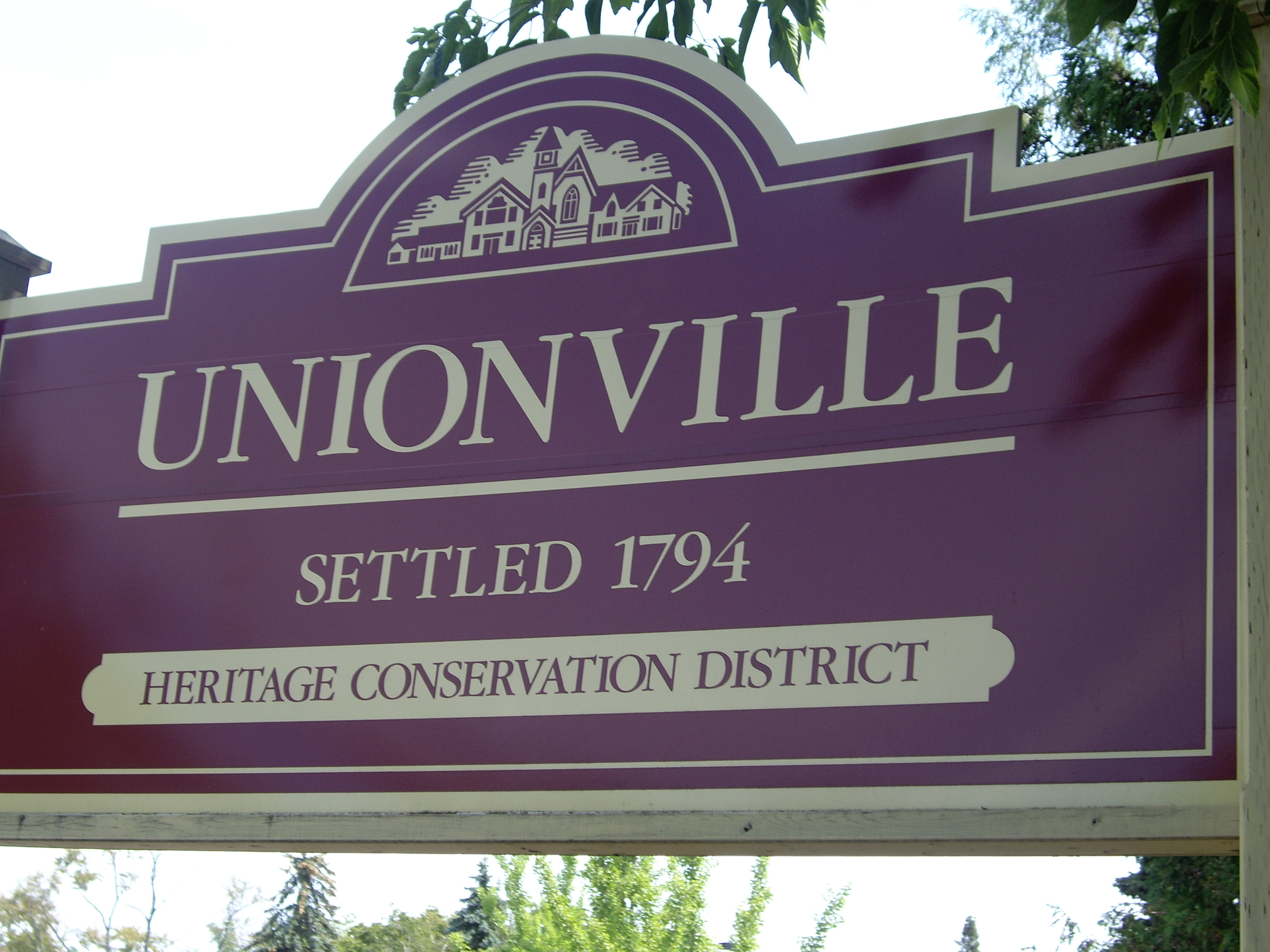
Unionville Welcome Sign

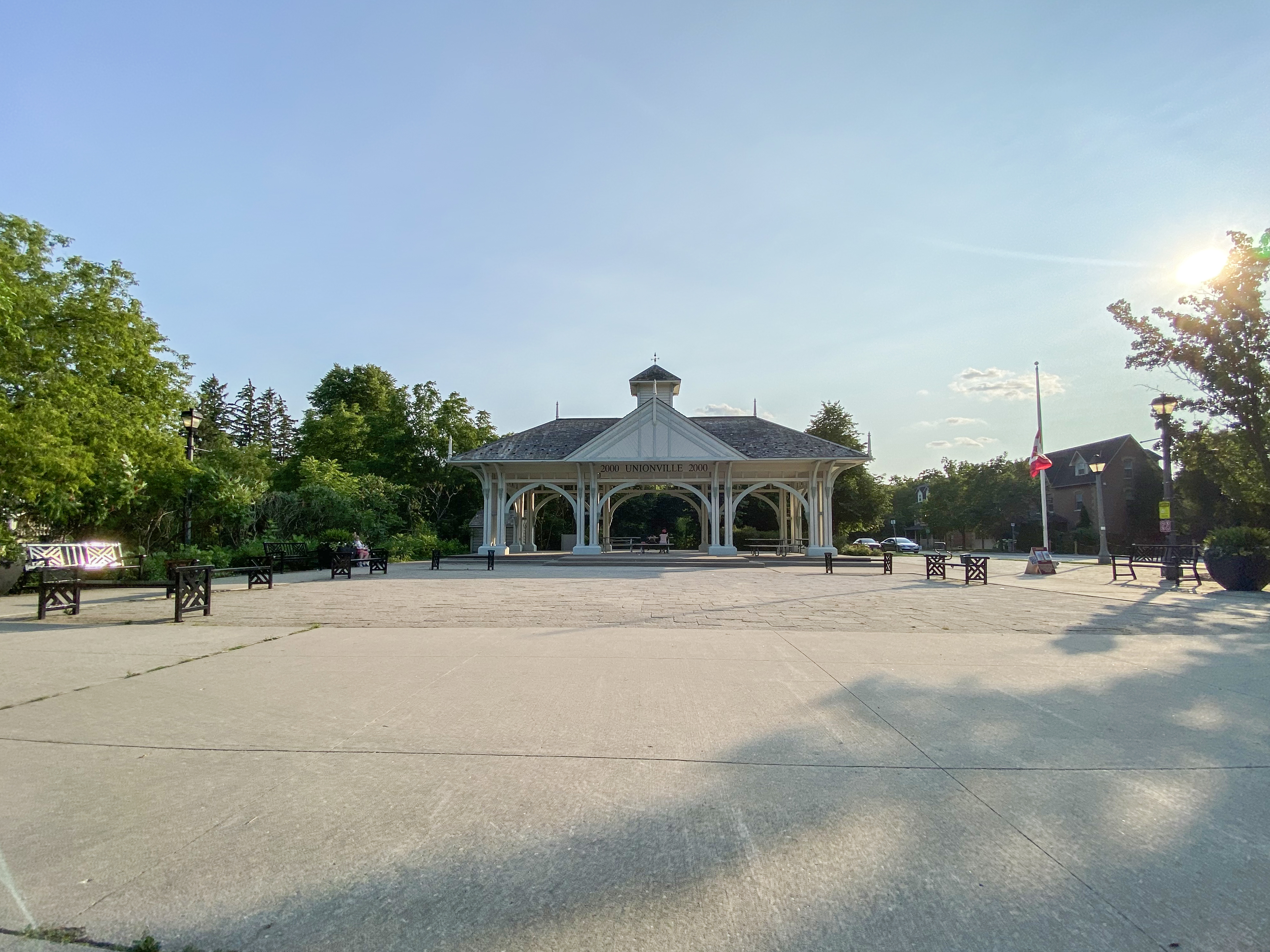
Unionville Millennium bandstand

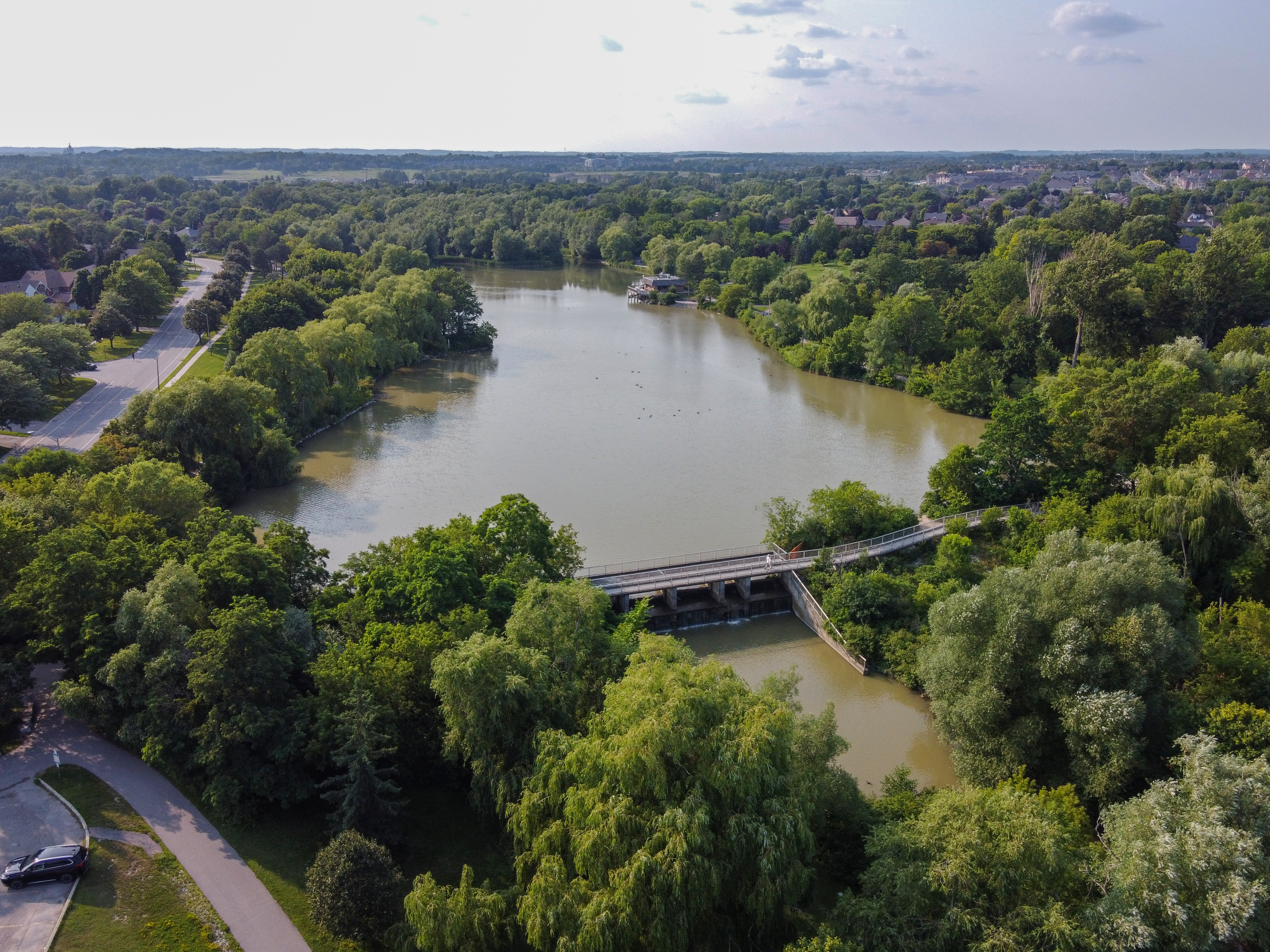
Toogood Pond

Unionville is a suburban district and former village in Markham, Ontario, Canada, 2 km (2.5 mi) northeast of Downtown Markham (the City of Markham's modern downtown), 2 km (2.5 mi) west of Markham Village (Markham's historic downtown), and 33 km (20.5 mi) northeast of Downtown Toronto, centred around the intersection of Highway 7 and Kennedy Road. The boundaries of Unionville are not well-defined. Several nearby neighbourhoods are claimed to be part of it however, this has been disputed between the various wards. The Unionville Ratepayers Association designates Rodick Road as its western boundary.

Unionville was founded north of 16th Avenue in 1794 as the farms on and around Kennedy Road. Main Street Unionville; originally part of the course of Kennedy Road, runs through Unionville village, with a new alignment of Kennedy running 300 metres (330 yd) to the east. Rouge River runs north of the village and to the southeast. Highway 404 is to the west, with the nearest interchange with Highway 407 is 2 kilometres (1.2 mi) south on Kennedy Road. Unionville is predominantly residential except for the south central industrial area, which is slated for massive intensification.

Tourism is a major part of Unionville's economy. The village itself still resembles the small town that developed over a century or so starting in the early 1840s (when Ira White erected his Union Mills) through the middle to late 20th century. Now a 'heritage conservation district', it attracts thousands of visitors each year — as of 2006 it boasted nine restaurants, including three pubs. Main Street (originally the laneway from the village's first grist mill) also has a number of "century homes" dating back to the 19th century. Each year, thousands of people visit Unionville during the Unionville Festival.

The main street has been a stand-in for fictional Connecticut town Stars Hollow during the first season of Gilmore Girls television show, and for other television and movie backdrops.

Most of the historic buildings in Unionville are included in List of historic buildings in Markham, Ontario.

== History ==
Unionville's name was derived from American-born Ira Allen White's Union Mills built in 1839, which in turn was named for the Act of Union 1840 of Upper Canada and Lower Canada. White would remain in the area at least up to 1860 but by 1878 his property as per York County Atlas belong to Hugh Powell Crosby as White moved to Yarmouth, Ontario where he died in 1887 (but buried in Cedar Grove Mennonite Cemetery Markham).

William von Moll Berczy brought the first settlers to Markham Township in 1794; they were originally from Germany but first moved to New York State. After arriving here, they acquired large tracts of land near current day Berczy Village at 16th Avenue and Kennedy Road.

Illness and famine in 1795–1796 reduced the population but the others remained on the develop a settlement:

- Johann Niclaus Stober or John Stiver was another Berczy settler who is descendant of Charles and Francis Stiver whom established Stiver Mills
- Philip Eckardt who is a Berczy settler who descendant farmed lands in Markham. Eckardt is tied to the Bethesda Lutheran Church

By 1851, the population was 200, served by a grist mill, a saw mill and two churches (Primitive Methodist and Presbyterian).

Unionville was a police village within what was then Markham Township within York County until the end of 1970, at which time the county was reorganized into Regional Municipality of York. Unionville and the other police village in the township (Thornhill) as well as the Village of Markham were abolished and amalgamated with Markham Township, which was reincorporated as the Town of Markham (changed to city in 2012), with some of the township's lands being ceded to neighbouring Richmond Hill and Whitchurch–Stouffville. The town and the township were named after two different people named "Markham".

A historic concrete bridge carrying Unionville Main Street was built by Octavius Hicks in 1909.

The name "Unionville" remained a valid postal address until the early 1990s at which time most addresses were changed to "Markham". In 2009, Markham Town Council reinstated the name "Unionville" for that portion of postal addresses within its Ward 3, which lies between Warden, 16th, McCowan and the 407. However, the Post Office used "Unionville" as the postal address for a larger delivery area that included the farms and later urban areas that it considered to be in Unionville. Unionville's historical boundaries, therefore, may be based on the historic Post Office delivery area for the name "Unionville". These varied somewhat over a century and a half, as neighbouring post offices came and went, but at some time or other the following areas had a Unionville address:

- Highway 7 and southward: all of the area north of Steeles Avenue between Woodbine Avenue on the west and McCowan Road on the east, including both sides of Woodbine, McCowan and Highway 7.
- North of Highway 7: all of the area to 19th Avenue between Warden on the west and McCowan on the east, including both sides of Woodbine, McCowan and 19th.

Unionville has six postal codes, L3P, L3R, L3S, L6C, L6E, and L6G, in its postal service area.

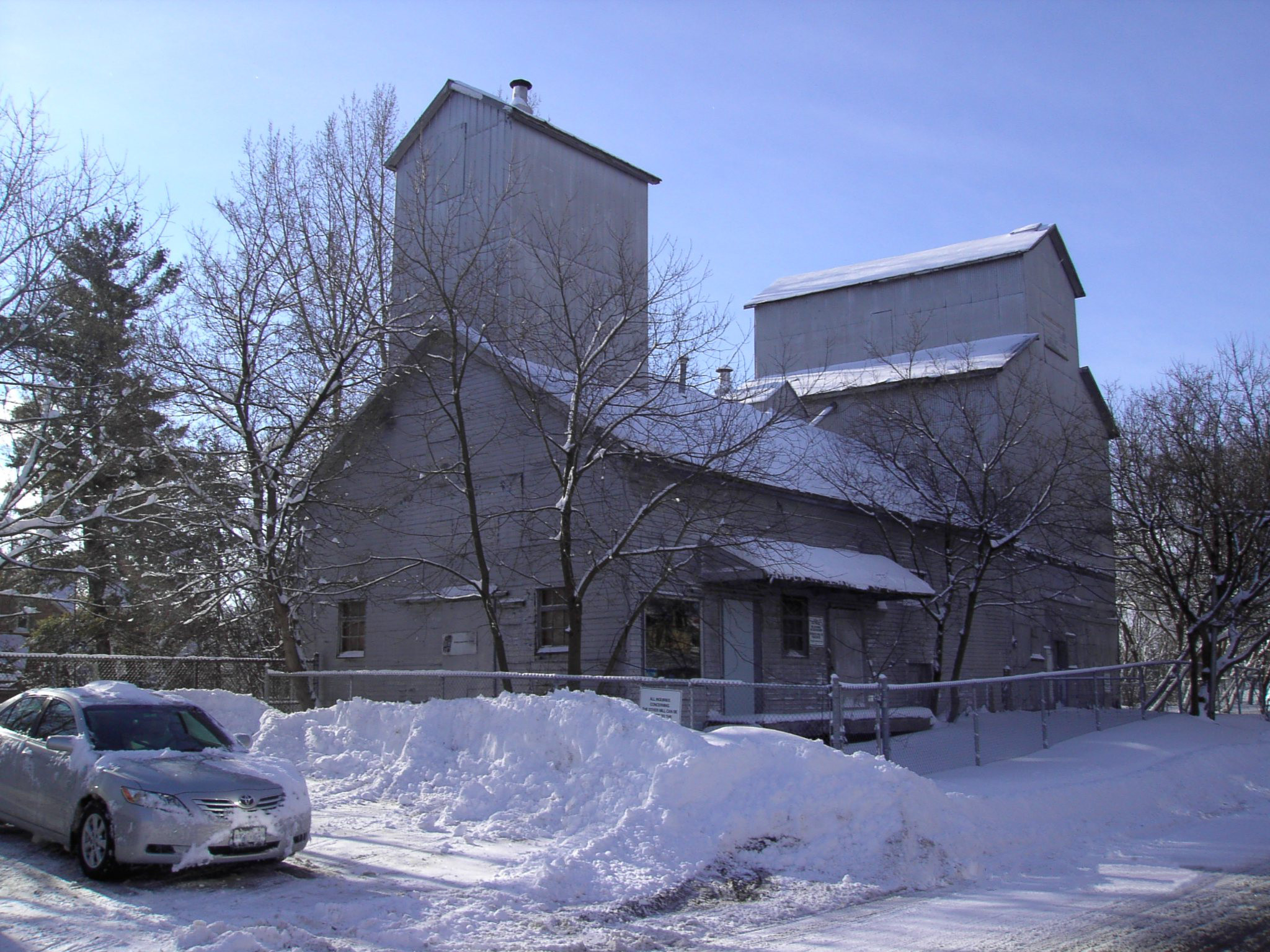
(Charles E.) Stiver Mill

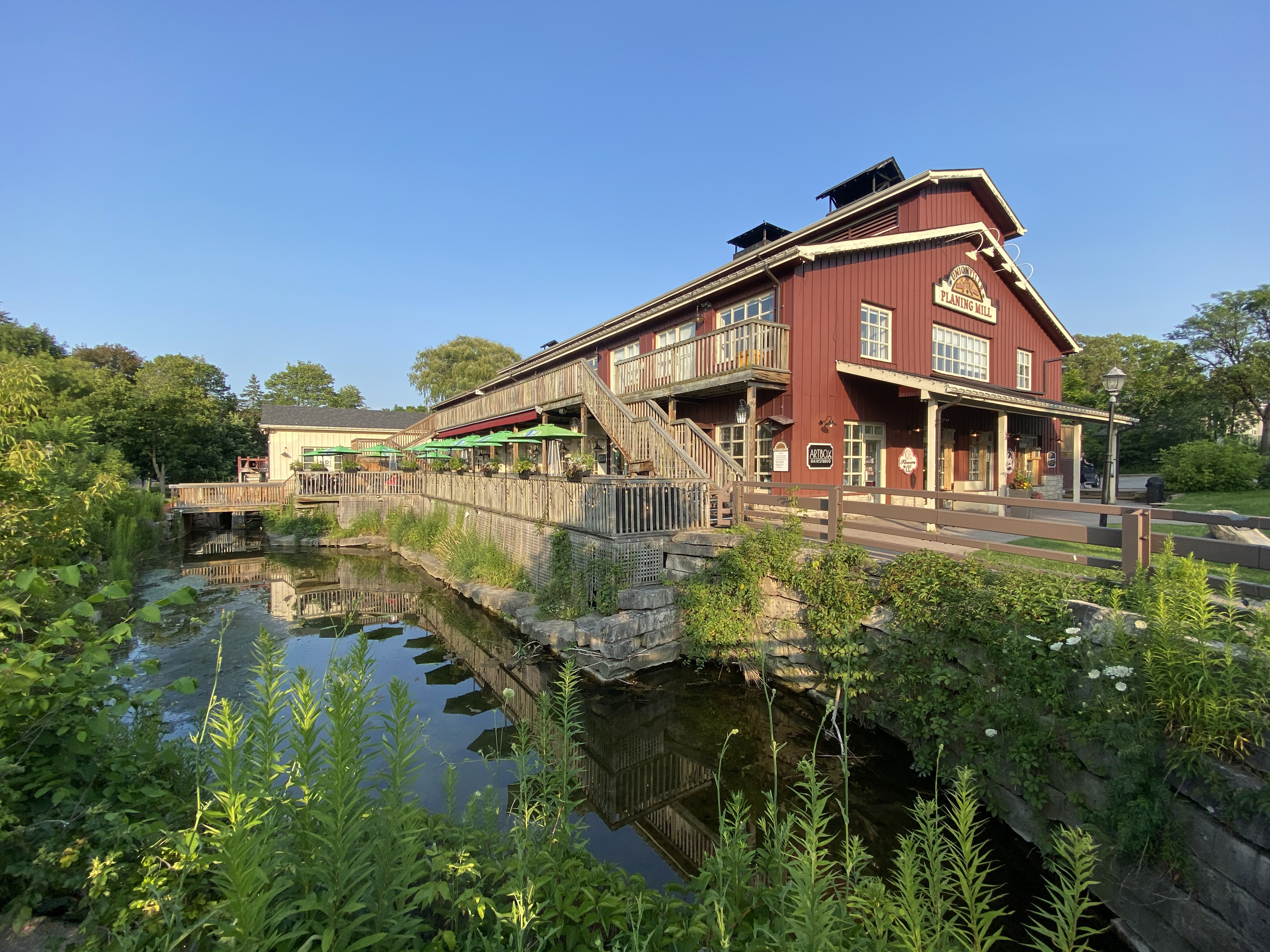
Unionville Planing Mill

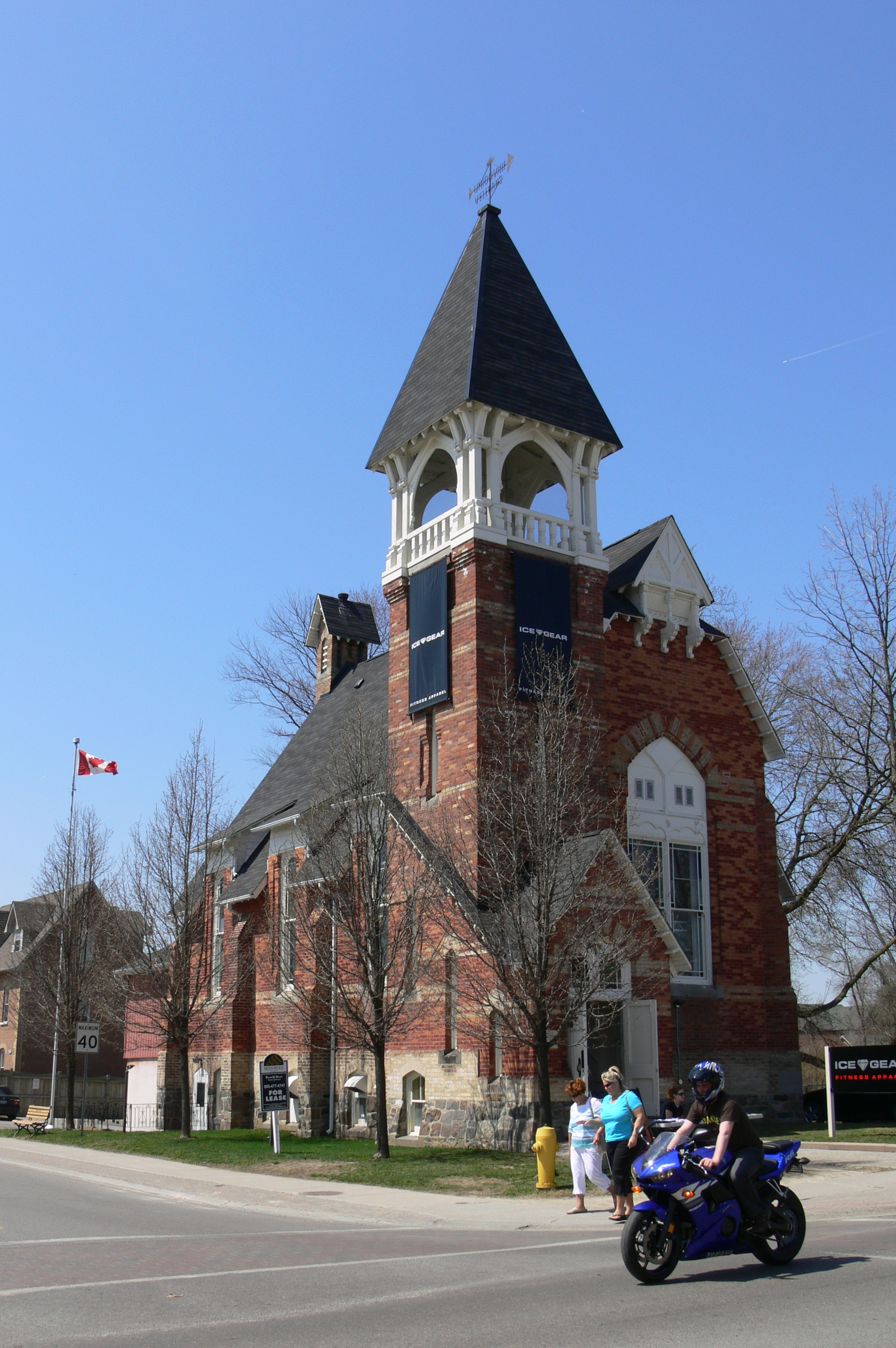
Old Unionville Congregational Church, built by Casa Loma architect E. J. Lennox 1879

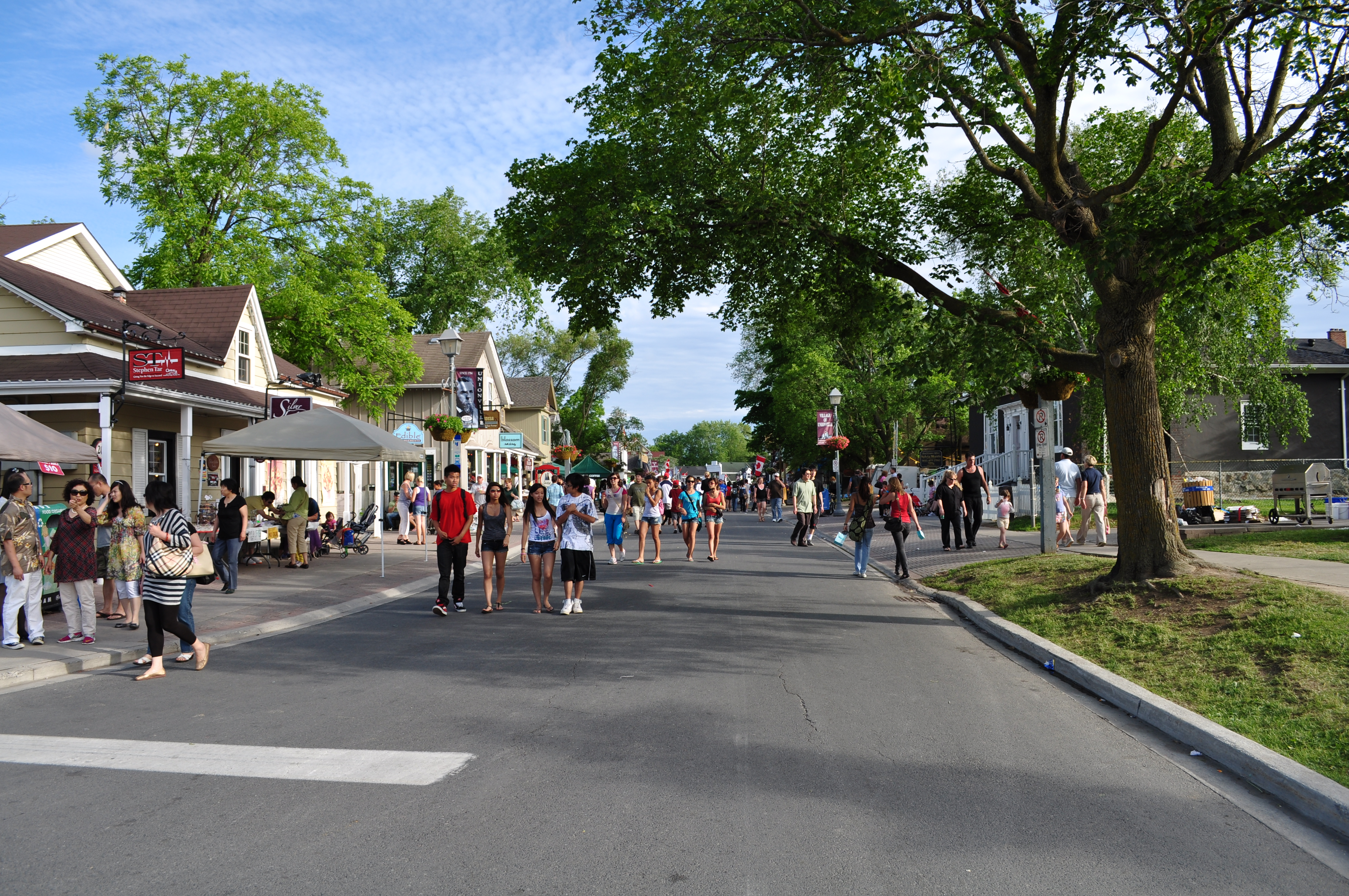
Unionville Main Street

In the 1960s, major housing development came to Unionville and is still ongoing. Having old buildings available at low cost, a number of antique stores sprang up and for a while in the 1970s Unionville ranked high on the list of places to go to get antiques. After the commitment to a bypass was realised, in the 1970s, entrepreneurs appeared. The Old Country Inn opened for business and Old Firehall Sports brought a new clientele to the village. Over the next decades, the typical antique places disappeared, being replaced by higher-end antique and replica outlets, restaurants, pubs, and clothing establishments. Tourism was born. Starbucks appeared in the late 1990s. Many of the buildings have been spruced up, extended and upgraded to meet this new reality. The old original road, to the immediate east of Main Street, has been converted to a large parking lot.

Walking paths through the local conservation lands connect directly to the village roads, one of the most used being the path around Toogood Pond, named after the Toogood family – the pond was originally the mill pond that powered the grist mill in the 1840s and created by flooding a section of Bruce Creek. In the early 20th century the pond was called Willow Pond or Willow Lake and was the home to several small summer cottages on north Main Street. Some had been cottages, for grist mill workers, in their earliest incarnation. Those cottages evolved into homes by the middle of the century, but are almost all gone now being replaced by large spacious expensive homes.

The Varley Art Gallery now stands at the north end of the commercial Main Street and is rapidly becoming a gallery of wide renown. It was started with the contributions of Mrs. McKay, who had supported Group of Seven artist Fred Varley for the later part of his life. Living in her home on Main Street Unionville, he did several paintings that are now part of the Art Gallery collection and the home is now part of the Art Gallery's holdings, being used for small art shows on a regular basis.

The Unionville Arms, a well-known pub, burnt down on 30 November 2007. It had been in business for 19 years prior. The building itself was over a century old. The legendary building caught fire in the morning, supposedly due to a combination of faulty kitchenware and wiring, and the century-old insulation. The fire was put out three hours later. No one was hurt. The Arms reopened in very much its original appearance, towards the end of December 2008.

The Stiver Mill is a historic building located near the railway tracks on Main Street Unionville. The building was restored in 2014 and is now a community centre. The area around the building has also been modernized for accessibility to both the centre and the train station next to it.

The killing of Bich-Ha Pan and attempted murder of Hann Pan took place in Unionville on 8 November 2010.

== Geography ==
Along with the village, today Unionville as a whole is an established suburban community. During the period of early urbanization in the 1970s a ban was placed on development for 25 years. Based on the boundaries for Ward 3, Unionville is bounded by Warden Avenue to the west, 16th Avenue to the north, McCowan Road to the east, and Highway 407 to the south, although it is commonly seen to include the surrounding neighbourhoods of Buttonville, Angus Glen, Milliken, South Unionville, and even Downtown Markham. Some land is still vacant on the lands of York Downs Golf which is slated for redevelopment in the coming years. The Highway 7 corridor west of the village will feature redevelopment with several mid rise and high rise buildings which will combine a village and an urban character.

== Demographics ==
Unionville, according to Statistics Canada, in the course of five years between 2006 and 2011, the population steadily increased from 7368 to 8906. In the census data collected, the GNR rate in 2011 appeared as 17.4%.

Generations

According to statistics Canada, Between 2006 and 2011, the increase in 2nd generation Canadian citizens moved from 970 to 2330 individuals. However, for first generations, the increase was not as drastic as 2nd generation citizens. The increase was from 4955 to 6225.

Citizenships

Residents who had legal citizenship in 2006 were 78% and who didn't were 22%. The numbers obtained indicated residents who were 18 years and above. The 2011 data showed similar, showing increase in one percent, indicated 79% of the population containing citizenship.

== Arts and culture ==
Crosby Memorial Arena and Community Centre
- Interactive map of Crosby Memorial Arena and Community Centre
- Location: 210 Main Street Unionville, Markham, Ontario
- Owner: City of Markham
- Operator: City of Markham

Construction
- Opened: 1928

Unlike other communities in Markham, Unionville proper does not have a community centre. Crosby Memorial Arena, an indoor rink built in 1928, is the only major sports venue in the area. The arena is named for the Crosby family of Markham Village, who came to Markham in 1806 and established themselves as farmers, landowners and storekeepers. Residents are within driving distance from Angus Glen Community Centre, Markham Pan Am Centre and Milliken Mills Community Centre.

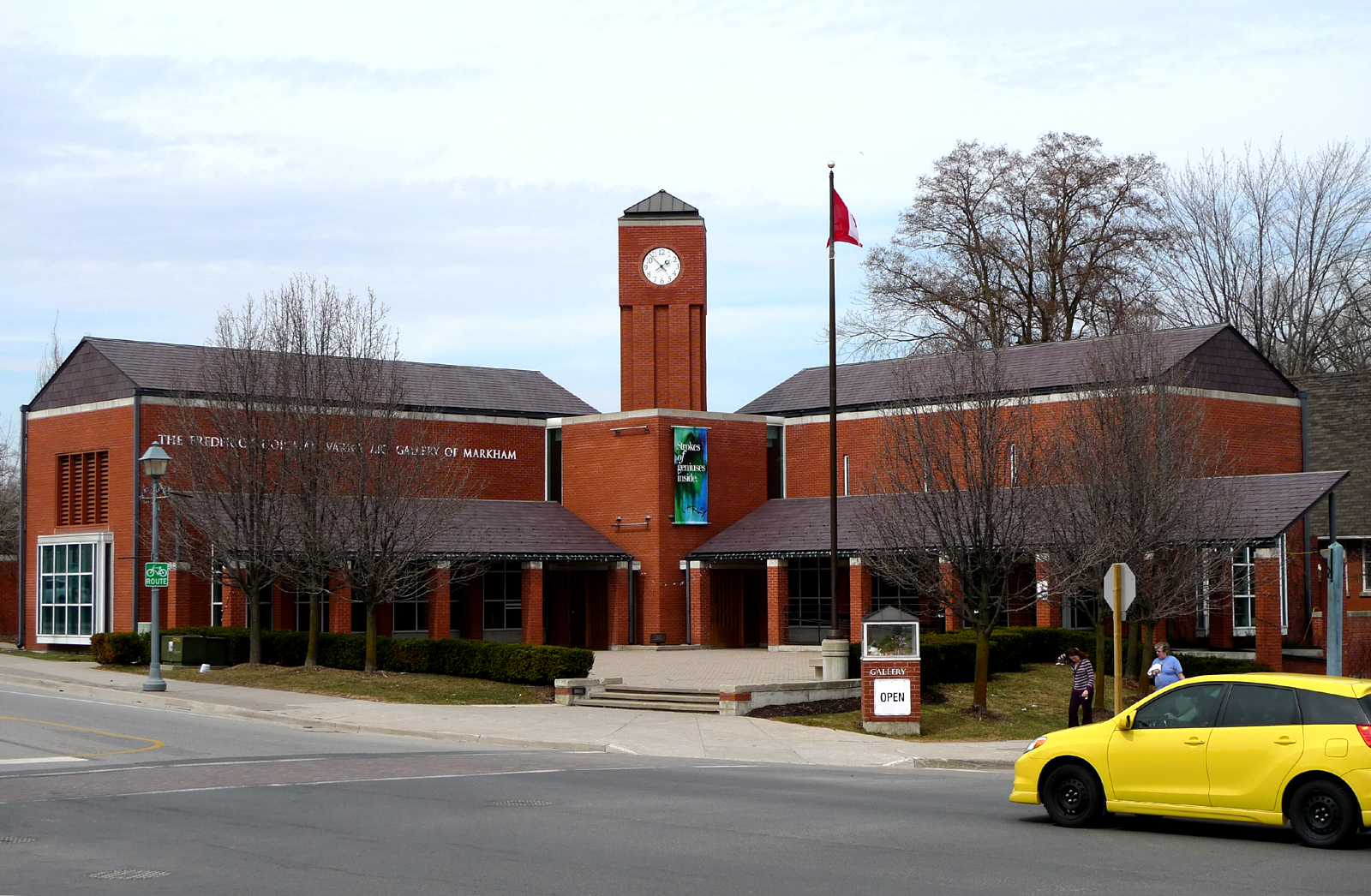
Varley Art Gallery

The Unionville Festival was first organized in 1969 to raise awareness and money to fight the provincial plan to reconstruct Main Street as a four-lane Kennedy Road through the middle of the village, destroying it. An interest in history, spurred by the Canadian Centennial Year in 1967, awoke the longtime residents and the new subdivision residents. Slowly, local politicians got on board, and a plan was drawn up to construct a new Kennedy alignment to the east of the historic town centre. Today the festival continues to offer visitors access to handcrafts, small vendors, live music and community groups. Virtually none of the businesses from the mid-20th century still exist, having been replaced by restaurants and tourist outlets.

The Unionville Business Improvement Area and its merchants, organize and operate numerous, year-round, admission free, festivals and events. The Merchants of Main Street Unionville BIA is the business association on Main Street Unionville, composed of volunteers from the business community, who work to preserve and promote the historical village of Unionville.

The Unionville BIA's Heritage Committee has seen its volunteers research and produce a self-guided walking tour. They also offer the official walking tours of Main Street Unionville.

Unionville has a number of regular events ongoing throughout the year. Dates for these can be found on the relevant web sites. Here is a sampling:

- Unionville Village Festival – first weekend of June
- Unionville Heritage Festival – Labour Day
- Olde Tyme Christmas Candlelight Parade – first Friday of December
- Olde Tyme Christmas Breakfast with Santa – morning after the Parade
- Canada Day – 1 July
- Markham Jazz Festival – August
- Thursday Nights at the Bandstand – all summer long
- Doors Open Markham – usually autumn
- Remembrance Day at the Cenotaph – 11 Nov

=== Stiver Mills Farmers' Market and Stiver Mills ===
Stiver Mill hosts a small farmers' type market ever Sunday from June to October (held indoors in the Mills to December) and operating since 2009. The market was founded by Bob Stiver, a descendant of the Stiver brothers.

The Stiver family has resided in Unionville and Markham since 1794 as part of the wave of migrants brought over by William Berczy.

The market is located next to the historic Stiver Mill, a grain mill built in 1916 (as well as structures moved from Matthew Grain Company of Toronto) for Charles and Francis Stiver and operated as Stiver Brothers until 1968. Besides grains (as well as seed and feed), the business sold cement, coal and salt.

The site was acquired by the then Town of Markham in 1993 and closed from 2013 to 2014 when the mills structure was restored.

== Government ==
Unionville is (depending on its definition) within the following city wards and political ridings:

- Ward 3; represented by Councilor Reid McAlpine
- Ward 4; represented by Councilor Karen Rea (see discussion of boundaries above)
- Ward 6; represented by Councilor Amanda Yeung Collucci (see discussion of boundaries above)
- Markham—Unionville; provincial electoral riding, represented by Billy Pang (Progressive Conservative Party of Ontario)
- Markham—Unionville; federal electoral riding, represented by Michael Ma (Liberal Party of Canada)

== Infrastructure ==
=== Transportation ===
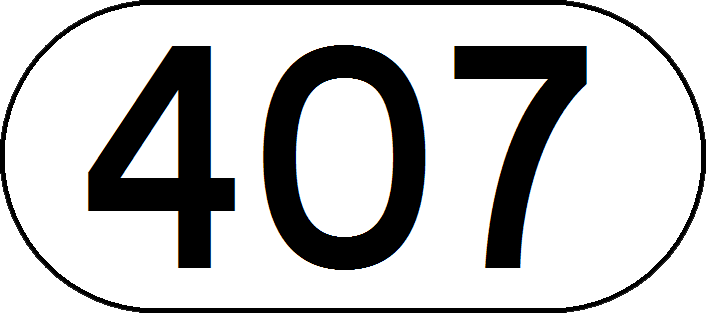
- Highway 407 ETR
- York Region Transit – bus routes on Highway 7 and 16th Avenue
- Viva – Viva Purple route
- GO Train/Bus at Unionville GO Station
- Highway 7
- Toronto Transit Commission – bus routes 68 Warden, 43 Kennedy, 17 Birchmount

== Education ==
=== Primary and secondary schools ===
York Region District School Board operates public schools:

- Unionville High School
- Markville Secondary School
- Bill Crothers Secondary School
- Unionville Public School
- William Berczy Public School
- Buttonville Public School
- Central Park Public School
- Coledale Public School
- Parkview Public School
- Unionville Meadows Public School

York Catholic District School Board operates Catholic separate schools:

- St. Augustine Catholic High School
- All Saints Catholic Elementary School
- St. Matthew Catholic Elementary School
- John XXIII Catholic Elementary School
- St. Justin Martyr Catholic Elementary School

Conseil scolaire catholique MonAvenir operates one French (first language) Catholic separate school:

- Sainte-Marguerite-Bourgeoys French Catholic Elementary School

Private schools:

- Unionville Montessori Private School

=== Public libraries ===
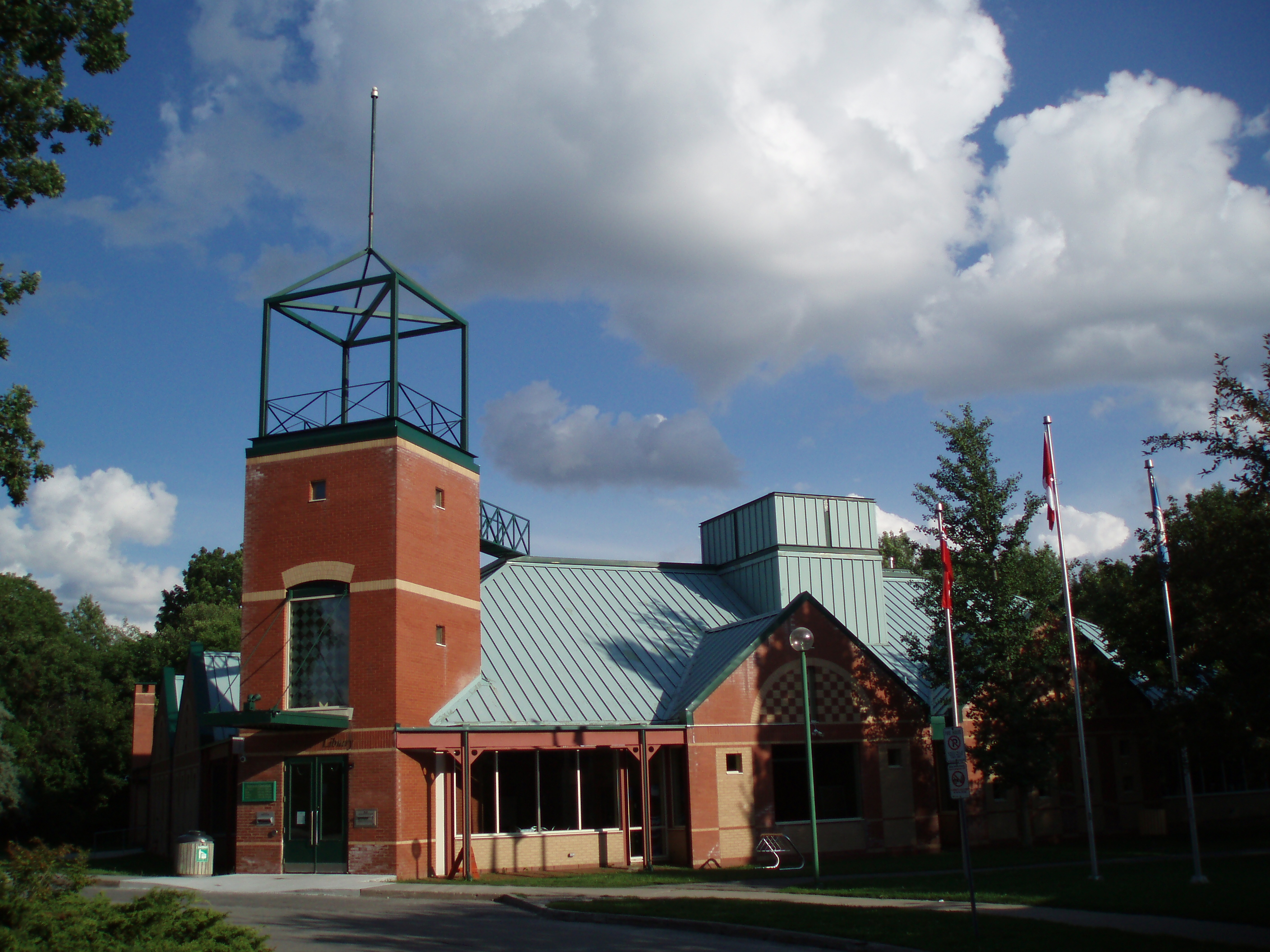
Markham Public Library, Unionville Branch

A new library, the Markham Public Library (Unionville branch), was completed in 1984, replacing the older Unionville Library, which was renamed the "Old Library Community Centre", and is now used for dance classes, meetings, and a church. The new library occupies 1,300 square metres, and is based on a traditional village square surrounded by eight "houses" of books expressed on the exterior as postmodern Victorian dormers. The library, which contains approximately 100,000 books and audiovisual materials, was designed by architect Barton Myers.

== Notable people ==
- Hayden Christensen of Star Wars fame attended Unionville High School.
- Emmanuelle Chriqui – actress who appeared in the television series Entourage and the films On the Line, Snow Day, and In the Mix.
- Anna Russell – singer and comedian – Anna Russell Way is named after her.
- Steven Stamkos ice hockey player of the Nashville Predators.
- Paul Poirier a figure skater. Competed in 2010 Vancouver Winter Olympics.
- Howie Lee ice hockey player who was a member of the Kitchener-Waterloo Dutchmen who won the bronze medal for Canada in ice hockey at the 1956 Winter Olympics.
- Joe Bowen – Toronto Maple Leafs broadcaster.
- James Duthie – TSN Hockey analyst.
- Ken Pereira – field hockey midfielder.
- Bob Beckett – former ice hockey centre.
- Andrea Beck – Montreal-born author best known for her Elliot Moose books.
- Donald Deacon – deacon, OC, O.PEI, MC (1920–2003) was an MPP for the provincial riding of York Centre, a businessman, and volunteer. He was made an officer of the Order of Canada in 2003.
- Marc Bendavid – film, television and stage actor.
- Gillian Apps – women's ice hockey player. She is the granddaughter of Hockey Hall of Fame member Syl Apps and the daughter of former National Hockey League player Syl Apps, Jr. and his wife Anne.

== See also ==
- Main Street Unionville
- List of historic buildings in Markham, Ontario
