= Frederick Horsman Varley Art Gallery =

Frederick Horsman Varley Art Gallery of Markham
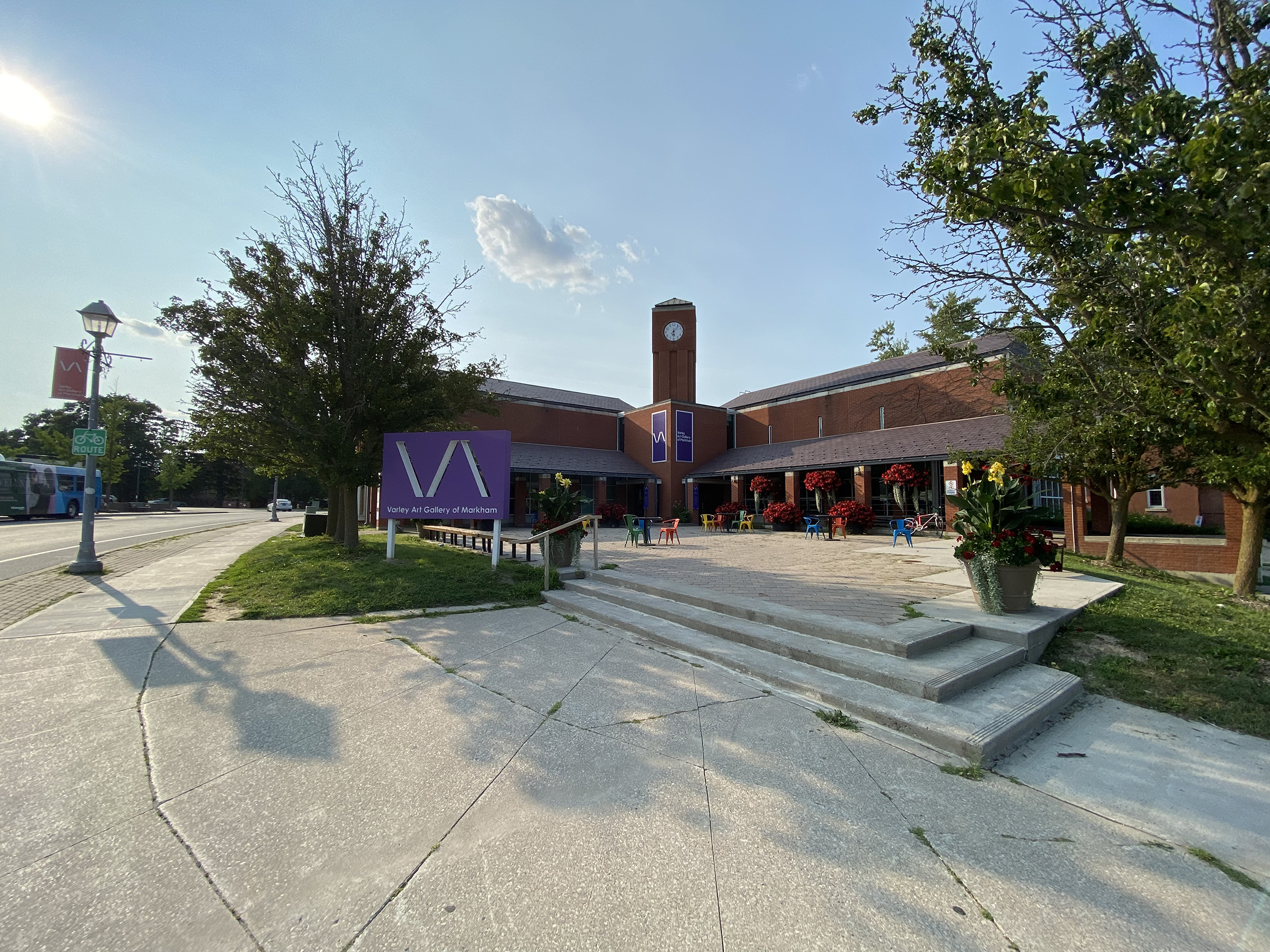
- Exterior view of the museum from the southeast
- Established: May 1997; 29 years ago
- Location: 216 Main Street Unionville, Markham, Ontario, Canada
- Coordinates: 43°52′09″N 79°18′45″W
- Type: Art museum
- Director: Niamh O'Laoghaire
- Curator: Anik Glaude
- Owner: City of Markham
- Website: www.markham.ca/wps/portal/home/arts/varley-art-gallery

Frederick Horsman Varley Art Gallery, or the Varley Art Gallery of Markham, is an art museum in Markham, Ontario, Canada. The museum is situated in a 1,400 square metres (15,000 sq ft) building on Main Street Unionville. The gallery was named after Frederick Varley, an artist from the Group of Seven, and was opened in May 1997.

The gallery features a frequent changing of displays of the artwork done by local, national, and international artists. The gallery offers group tours, school programs, studio courses and workshops, courses and lectures, and family activities.

The art gallery is a short walk from Salem-Eckhardt House, the historical figure Kathleen Gormley McKay's residence. The house was built in the 1840s, and later became home to Frederick Varley. Kathleen Gormley McKay donated many of the original Frederick Varley pieces to the gallery.

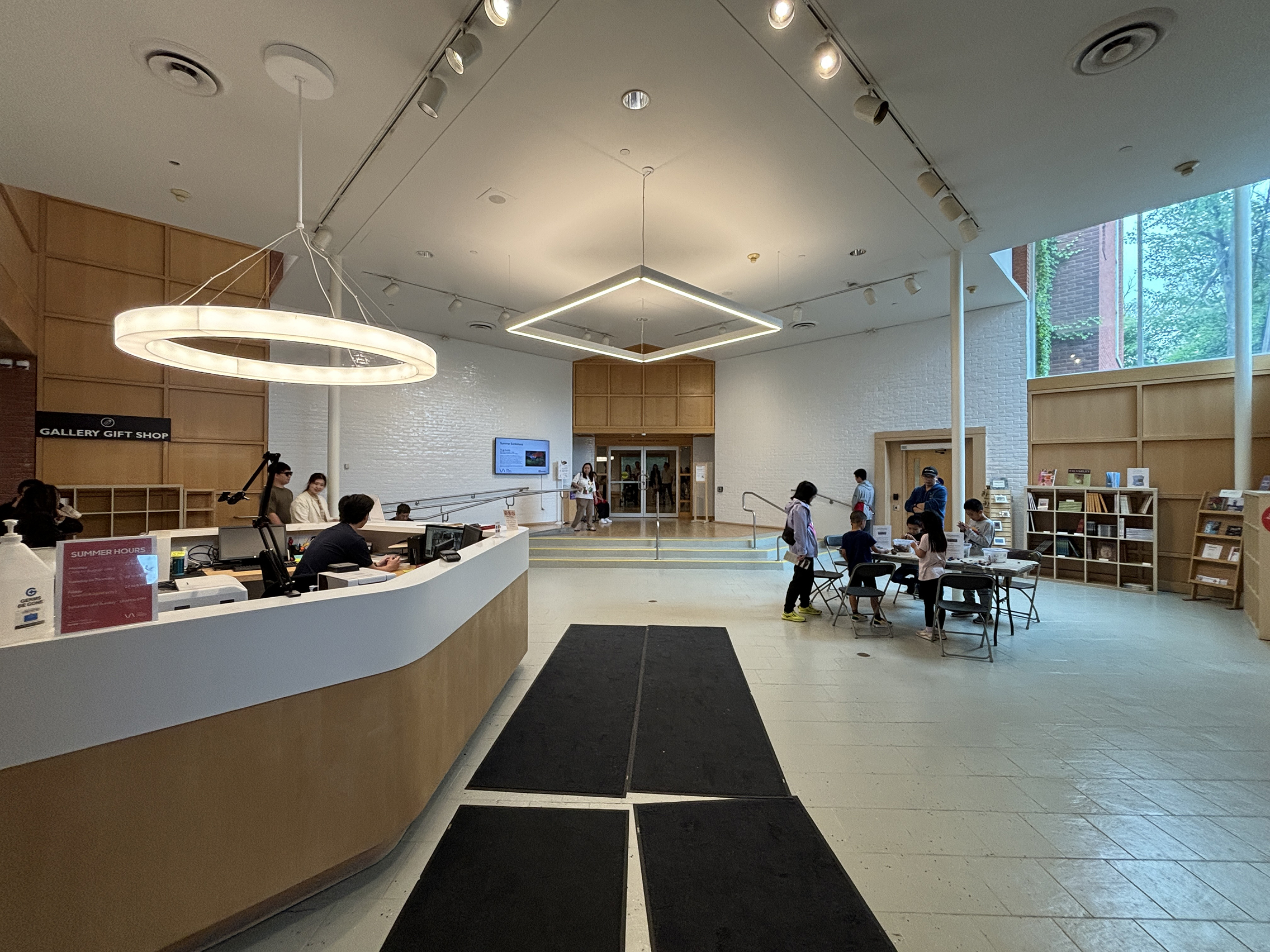
Lobby

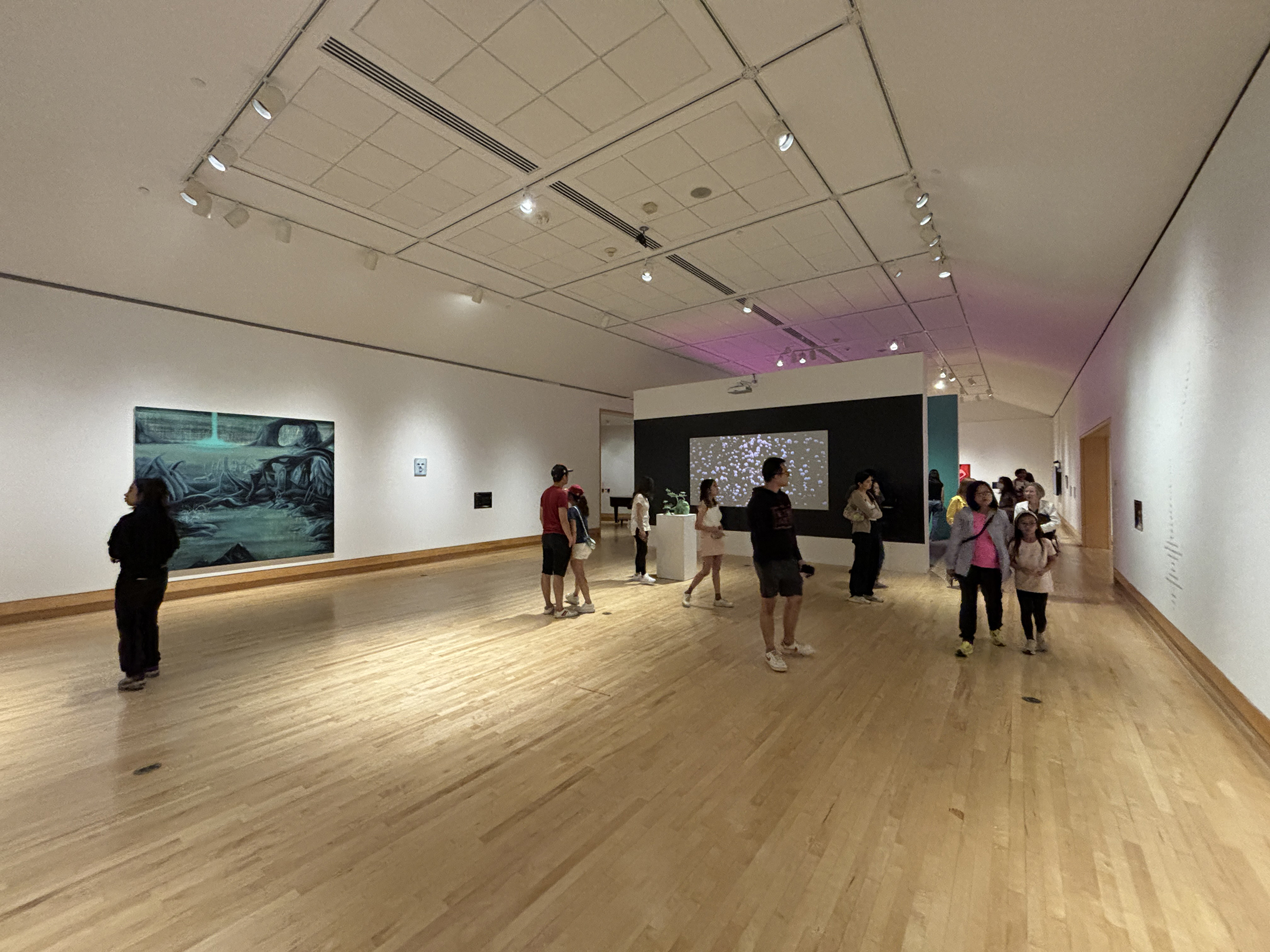
Main gallery

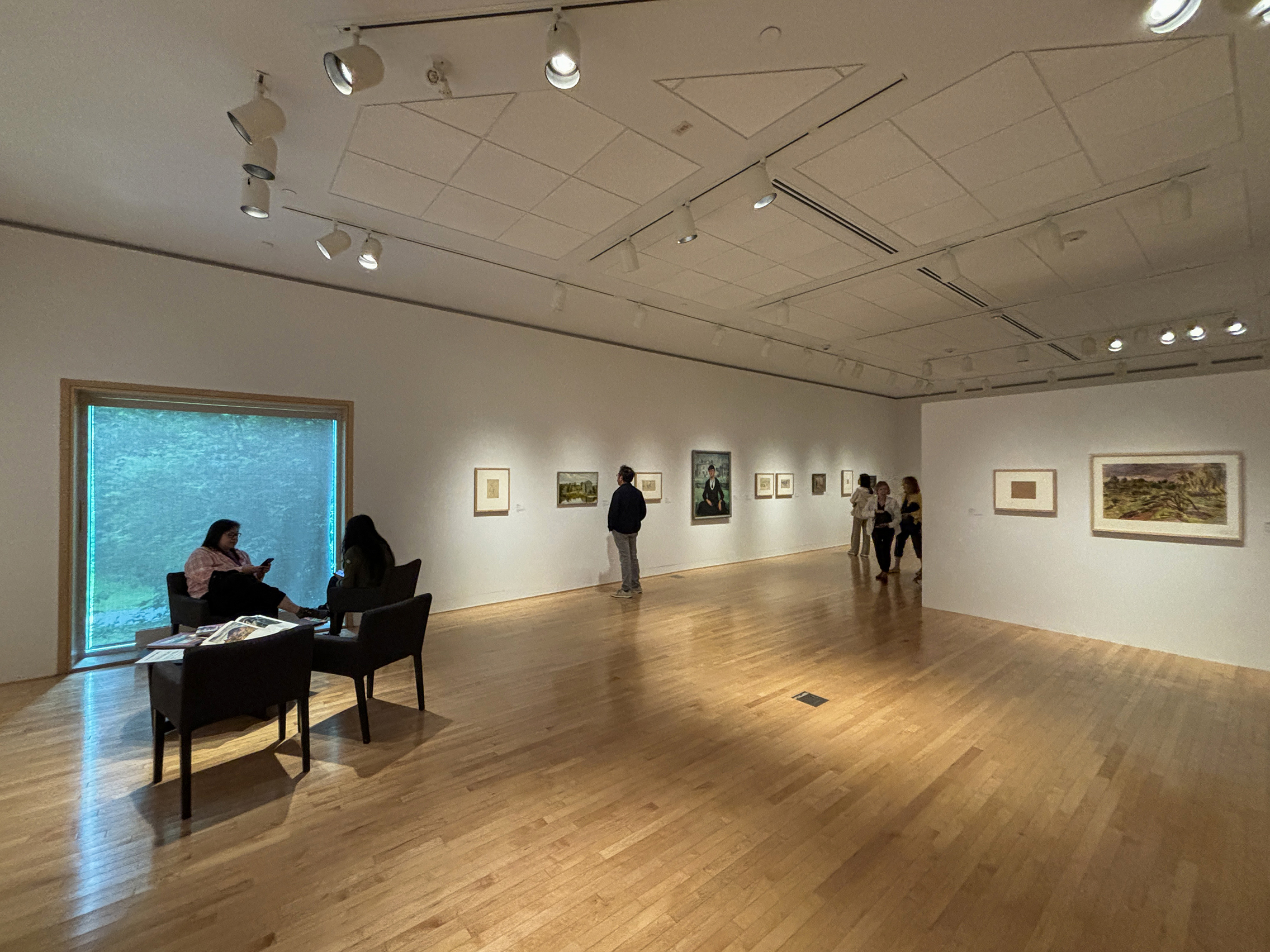
Gallery 1
