= Markville Secondary School =

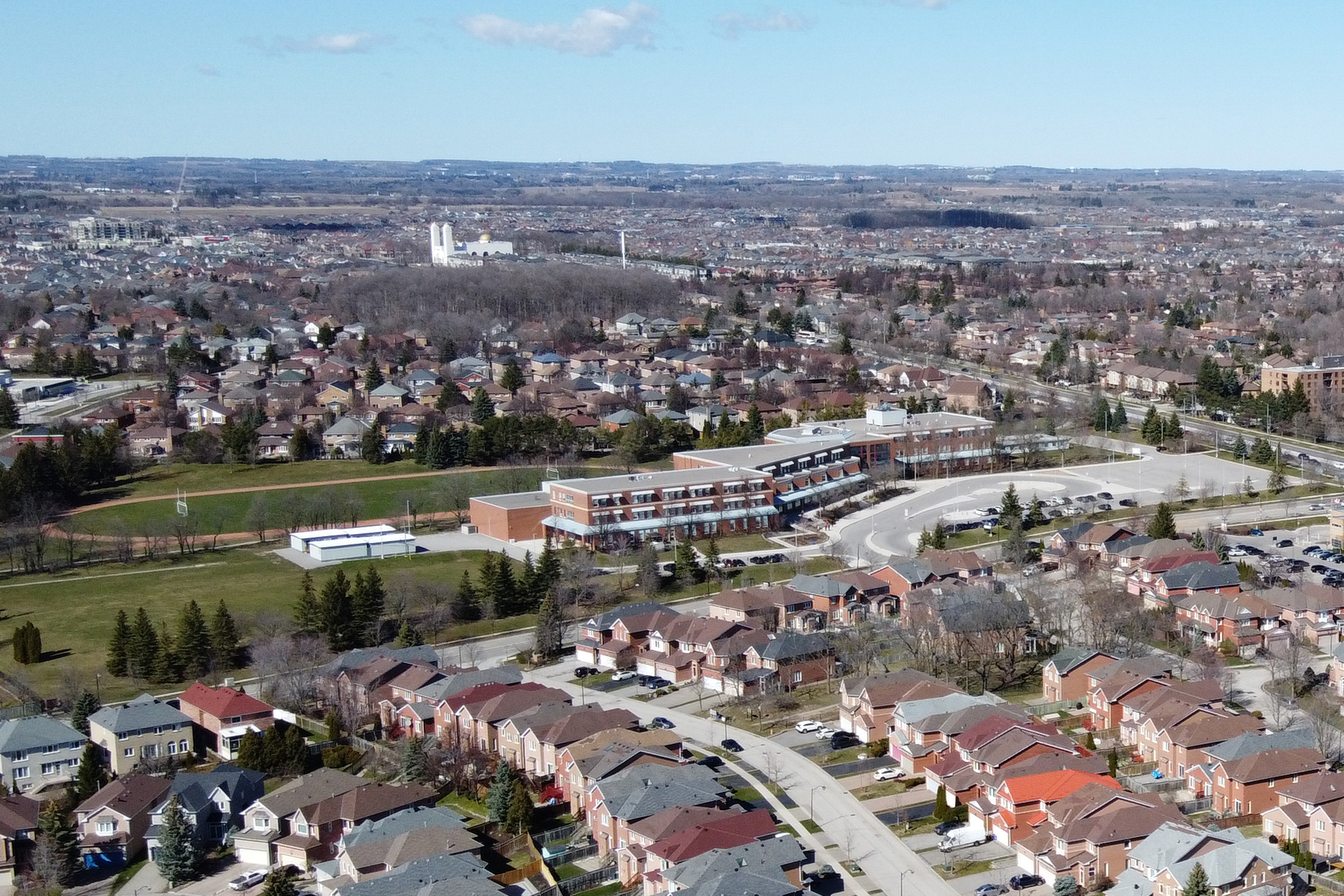
- Markville Secondary School

Location
- 1000 Carlton Road; Markham, Ontario, L3P 7P5; Canada; 43°52′37″N 79°17′16″W

Information
- School type: High school
- Motto: Living, Sharing and Learning Together
- Founded: 1990
- School board: York Region District School Board
- School number: 924849
- Grades: 9–12
- Language: English
- Colours: Blue and green
- Mascot: The Maverick
- Team name: Markville Mavericks
- Provincial Ranking (2022): 26 / 685
- Provincial Ranking (5 years): 5 / 643
- OSSLT 2019 pass rate (first-time eligible): 95.2%
- Website: www.yrdsb.ca/schools/markville.ss/Pages/default.aspx
- Last updated: November 2024

Markville Secondary School (commonly known as MSS or Markville) is a public high school located in Unionville, Ontario, Canada. It is one of 33 high schools administered by the York Region District School Board. The school had 1,429 students enrolled in 2025.

== History ==
Markville S.S. is located in an area that was developed by the Melchior Quantz family of Germany in the city of Markham who came to North America with William Berczy. The terrain map of 1860 shows five houses fronting on present day McCowan Road, all inhabited by members of the family, the senior member of which was George B. Quantz and his wife, Jane Bradburn.

In 2023, students from Markville Secondary School scored first place in a provincial Envirothon competition.

== Academics ==
=== History ===
As of 2009, teachers Adrienne Chong, Rob Cotey and Mark Melnyk have received the Prime Minister's Awards for Teaching Excellence. They teach Canadian and World History, World Politics, Genocide and Crimes Against Humanity, World History to the End of the 15th Century, Honours Thesis, and World Religions through grades 10 to 12.

=== Music ===
Each year, the music students of Markville compete in several music festivals. These include the OBA (Ontario Band Association), Kiwanis Music Festival, and Music Alive. In addition, two concerts are held at the Markham Theatre. "Festive Sounds" is held in winter, and "Markville Pops" is held in the spring.

=== Ranking ===
From 2018-2019 , Markville Secondary School ranked number #2 among secondary schools on the Fraser Institute School Ranking in Ontario, and ranked #5 for the 5 year period from the school year ending in 2014 to 2019.

== Notable alumni ==
- Julie Hastings, curler

== See also ==
- Education in Ontario
- List of secondary schools in Ontario
