= 2006 Vaughan municipal election =

Municipal election in Ontario, Canada

The City of Vaughan 2006 Municipal Election took place on November 13, 2006. One mayor, three regional councillors and five local councillors were elected for the city of Vaughan, Ontario, Canada. In addition, local school trustees were elected to the York Region District School Board, York Catholic District School Board, Conseil scolaire de district du Centre-Sud-Ouest and Conseil scolaire de district catholique Centre-Sud. These elections were held in conjunction with all other municipalities across Ontario, which for the first time elected politicians to four year terms, rather than three years as had previously been the case. (see 2006 Ontario municipal elections).

== Results ==
The 2006 municipal election in Vaughan saw a number of major upsets and a number of other close races — contrary to past results in the city elections. All but one incumbent were re-elected.

=== Mayor ===
In the Mayoral race, former Regional Councillor Linda Jackson unseated incumbent Mayor and former Regional Councillor Michael Di Biase. This was the first time since the incorporation of the City of Vaughan that an incumbent mayor had been defeated. Jackson took the place of her mother, Lorna Jackson who had held the position before she succumbed to cancer prior to Di Biase's tenure. After the final results came in, Di Biase called for a recount due to the extremely close result . However, he later called off the recount and filed an application for an injunction in the Ontario Superior Court requesting that the election be declared “illegal and void” for a number of reasons including faulty vote-counting machines. On November 22, Di Biase again reversed his decision, asking City Council to support a recount. The results of the recount were released Nov. 30. Jackson was once again declared mayor with 28,402 votes over Di Biase's 28,308.

=== Regional Councillors ===
With Jackson no longer serving as a Regional Councillor, only two incumbents ran for that position, Mario Ferri and Joyce Frustaglio. In a surprise result, Frustaglio took first place in the race, making her the Deputy Mayor, a post held since Di Biase became Mayor by Mario Ferri. The third position was filled by a former Local and Regional Councillor, Gino Rosati.

=== Local Councillors ===
All five Ward Councilor positions were won by the incumbents, with many difficult challenges coming from former city staff and councillors.

== Potential issues ==
- Construction of the Thornhill Wal-Mart Mall
- Corporate donations to members of council
- Lack of a public hospital
- Mayoral and councillor salaries
- Traffic Gridlock
- New $96.3 Million Civic Centre construction, contracts and costs

== Candidates ==
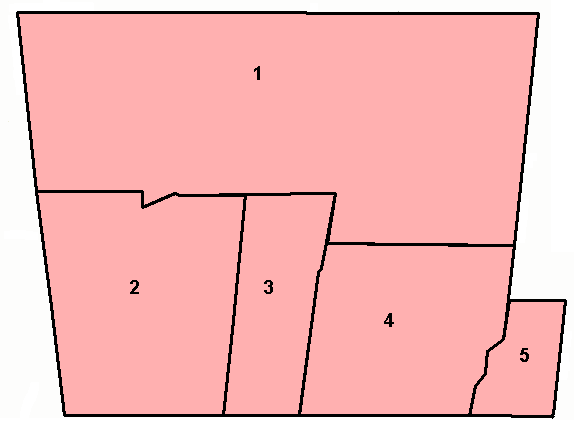
Map of Vaughan's 5 Wards

=== Mayor ===
Candidate	Votes	%
Linda D. Jackson	28,396	47.3
Michael Di Biase (incumbent)	28,306	47.2
Paul Stewart	2,645	4.4
Savino Quatela	637	1.1

=== Regional Council ===
Candidate	Votes	%
Joyce Frustaglio (incumbent)	30,202	22.6
Mario Ferri (incumbent)	26,855	20.1
Gino Rosati	26,129	19.6
Robert Craig	17,136	12.9
Joanna Cacciola-Lionti	11,876	8.9
Richard T. Lorello	7,525	5.6
Adriano Volpentesta	5,843	4.4
Franco Cavaliere	5,779	4.3
Quintino Mastrogiuseppe	2,037	1.5

Because Joyce Frustaglio received the highest vote count among the candidates for Regional Councillor, she is styled as the acting Mayor in cases where the Mayor is unavailable. However commonly confused, this is a different role than being the Deputy Mayor

=== Local Council ===
==== Ward 1 ====
Candidate	Votes	%
Peter Meffe (incumbent)	6,706	48.7
Marylin Iafrate	5,122	37.2
Mary Ruffolo	1,945	14.1

==== Ward 2 ====
Candidate	Votes	%
Tony Carella (incumbent)	6,359	43.6
Frank Cipollone	3,786	25.9
Deborah Schulte	2,751	18.9
Aurelio E. Acquaviva	907	6.2
Mario Di Nardo	486	3.3
Paul Donofrio	291	2.0

==== Ward 3 ====
Candidate	Votes	%
Bernie DiVona (incumbent)	5,344	47.9
Rosanna De Francesca	3,883	34.8
Paul De Buono	1,942	17.4

==== Ward 4 ====
Candidate	Votes	%
Sandra Yeung-Racco (incumbent)	3,695	41.2
Tina Molinari	2,869	32
Joe Levy	1,435	16
Vernon Hendrickson	970	10.8

==== Ward 5 ====
Candidate	Votes	%
Alan Shefman (incumbent via by-election)	2,944	38.4
Bernie Green	2,732	35.6
Elliott Frankl	1,291	16.8
Yehuda Shahaf	706	9.2

=== Withdrawals ===
- Mario G. Racco (nomination withdrawn from Ward 4 on Jan. 20)
- Aurelio E. Acquaviva (nomination withdrawn from Ward 1 on Aug 15, moved to Ward 2)
- Robert Craig (nomination withdrawn from Mayor on Aug 28, moved to Regional Councillor)
- Stan Grabowski (nomination withdrawn from Ward 2 on Sept. 27)
- Gino Ruffolo (nomination withdrawn from Mayor on Oct. 2)

== Controversy ==
Following the November 2006 election, former mayor Michael Di Biase appealed the results of the elections citing possible errors in the ballot counting machines. The results were reviewed following a decision in his favour in Ontario Superior Court, concluding that the original result, the election of Jackson as mayor, was the correct one.

== Trivia ==
- An article on website Wikipedia entitled "Vaughan municipal election, 2006" was cited as an issue in the campaign; the Vaughan Citizen newspaper has, to date, published two articles about opposing allegations of politically biased edits to this article.
- The 2006 Vaughan municipal election has the largest percentage of female candidates (27.3%) in the province. Nine out of thirty three candidates are women. It is possible for women to win every seat with the exception of one of the regional council seats and the Ward 5 council seat although it is still possible for men to win every seat.
- The Globe and Mail newspaper reports that Mayor Di Biase receives a salary of $164,074 per year, making him one of the highest-paid municipal politicians in the country. * The mayor of the largest city in Canada, David Miller of Toronto, which is over ten times the size of Vaughan in terms of population, receives $143,635 per year. The average salary of Vaughan councillors is $102,657, compared to Toronto councillors at $85,497.

Preceded by 2003 Vaughan municipal election	List of Vaughan municipal elections	Succeeded by 2010 Vaughan municipal election
