= 2014 York Region municipal elections =

2014 York Region municipal election
- October 27, 2014
Council before election
(2010)
Elected Council
(2014)

Elections in the Regional Municipality of York of Ontario, Canada were held on October 27, 2014 in conjunction with municipal elections across the province.

== York Regional Council ==
Position	Representing	Councillor	Notes
Chair	(selected by council)	Wayne Emmerson	former Mayor of Whitchurch-Stouffville
Councillor	Aurora	Geoffrey Dawe	Mayor of Aurora
Councillor	East Gwillimbury	Virginia Hackson	Mayor of East Gwillimbury
Councillor	Georgina	Margaret (Jordan) Quirk	Mayor of Georgina
Councillor	Georgina	Danny Wheeler	
Councillor	King	Steve Pellegrini	Mayor of King
Councillor	Markham	Frank Scarpitti	Mayor of Markham
Councillor	Markham	Jack Heath	
Councillor	Markham	Jim Jones	
Councillor	Markham	Joe Li	
Councillor	Markham	Nirmala Armstrong	
Councillor	Newmarket	Tony Van Bynen	Mayor of Newmarket
Councillor	Newmarket	John Taylor	
Councillor	Richmond Hill	Dave Barrow	Mayor of Richmond Hill
Councillor	Richmond Hill	Vito Spatafora	
Councillor	Richmond Hill	Brenda Hogg	
Councillor	Vaughan	Maurizio Bevilacqua	Mayor of Vaughan
Councillor	Vaughan	Mario Ferri	
Councillor	Vaughan	Gino Rosati	
Councillor	Vaughan	Sunder Singh	(Note: On May 19, 2017, Michael Di Biase stepped down amidst sexual harassment allegations. He was replaced on June 28, 2017 by Sunder Singh in a council vote, and Mario Ferri took his place as Deputy Mayor.)
Councillor	Whitchurch–Stouffville	Justin Altmann	Mayor of Whitchurch–Stouffville

Returning candidates who stood for election included Heath (Markham), Jones (Markham) and Li (Markham). Long-time Markham councillor Landon and current Chair Bill Fisch did not return to council.

== Aurora ==
Mayoral candidate	Vote	%
Geoffrey Dawe (X)	8,903	68.44
John Gallo	4,106	31.56

== East Gwillimbury ==
Mayoral candidate	Vote	%
Virginia Hackson (X)	4,068	58.41
Cathy Morton	2,897	41.59

== Georgina ==
Mayoral candidate	Vote	%
Margaret (Jordan) Quirk	7,226	58.86
Robert Grossi (X)	4,618	37.62
John Ancuta	367	2.99

== King ==
Mayoral candidate	Vote	%
Steve Pellegrini (X)	Acclaimed	

== Markham ==
2014 Markham Mayoral election
- October 27, 2014
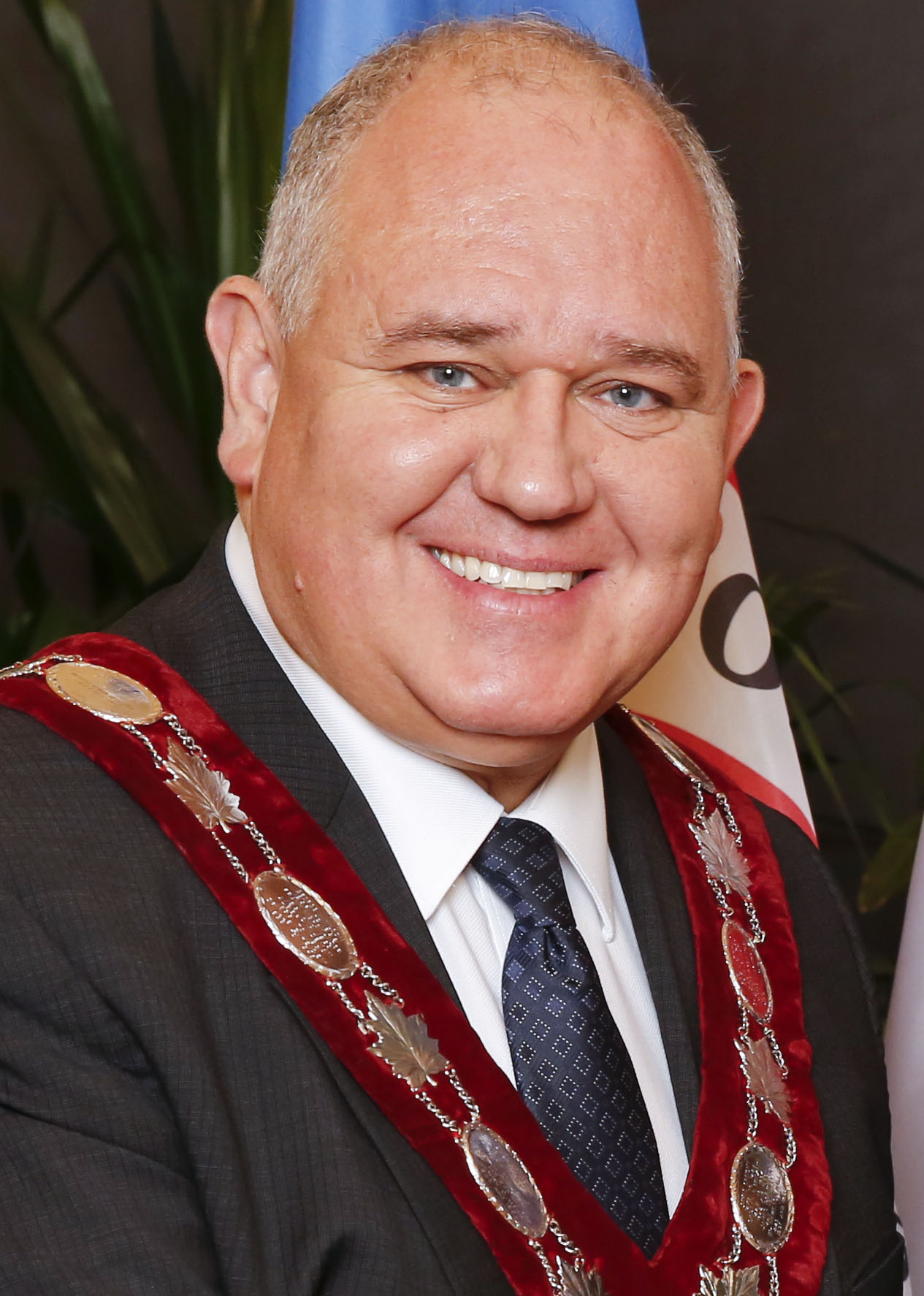
		SK	PC
Candidate	Frank Scarpitti	Stephen Kotyck	Patrick Cottrell
Popular vote	50,065	10,683	3,621
Percentage	70.97%	15.14%	5.13%
Mayor before election
Frank Scarpitti
Elected mayor
Frank Scarpitti

=== Mayor ===
Mayoral candidate	Votes	Vote %	Vote Δ(%)	Election spending
Frank Scarpitti (X)	50,065	70.97	-14.15	
Stephen Kotyck	10,683	15.14	+6.41	
Patrick Cottrell	3,621	5.13		
Partap Dua	3,326	4.71	-1.43	
James Treacy	2,850	4.04		

On October 16, 2014, Treacy 'withdrew' from the race and endorsed Kotyck. However his name still appeared on the ballot as his 'withdrawal' was past the deadline.

=== Regional Councillor ===
In Markham, Regional Councillors serve on both the City Council as well as York Region Council. Electors can vote for up to four candidates on their ballots, equal to the total number that may be elected. The four winning candidates are those whom receive the highest number of votes. The candidate with the highest number of votes received also serves as Deputy Mayor.

Regional councillor candidate	Votes	Vote %	Vote Δ(%)	Election spending
Jack Heath (X)	37,668	16.67	-3.41%	
Jim Jones (X)	33,119	14.65	-0.24%	
Joe Li (X)	29,247	12.94	-1.44%	
Nirmala Armstrong (X)	23,834	10.54	-1.90%	
Sophia Sun	16,931	7.49		
Peter Pavlovic	16,413	7.26	-1.93%	
Ivy Lee	15,799	6.99		
Bin Chang	14,863	6.58		
Charles Deacon	14,042	6.21		
Tammy Mok	11,827	5.23		
Nadeem Qureshi	7,315	3.24		
Surinder Issar	4,971	2.20	-0.85%	

Incumbents Jack Heath, Jim Jones, and Joe Li sought re-election, while Gordon Landon announced his retirement before the close of nominations.

The election returned all standing incumbents to office. Landon's vacated seat was won by Nirmala Armstrong.

=== Ward 1 ===
Councillor candidate	Votes	Vote %	Election spending
Valerie Burke (X)	7,055	71.48	
Howard Ian Shore	2,815	28.52	

Markham reviewed the boundaries of its ward system in 2013. In an attempt to balance the City's electoral districts to match current population and growth patterns, it merged Thornhill's two wards into one. As a result, incumbents Burke and Shore ran against each other to represent the new ward.

=== Ward 2 ===
Councillor candidate	Votes	Vote %	Election spending
Alan Ho (X)	2,932	39.29	
Jim Kwan	1,905	25.53	
David Papadimitriou	1,693	22.69	
Daphne Wong	933	12.50	

New Ward 2 created for 2014 from former Ward 6 with old Ward 6 councillor Alan Ho running. David Papadimitriou and Jim Kwan ran in old Ward 6 in last election.

=== Ward 3 ===
Councillor candidate	Votes	Vote %	Vote Δ(%)	Election spending
Don Hamilton (X)	6,212	74.17	+8.55	
Nelson Cheng	604	7.21		
Vincent Cheung	592	7.07		
Christine Brawley	465	5.55		
Adam Poon	330	3.94		
Jawed Syed	172	2.05		

The boundaries of the ward were left unchanged after the 2013 review. Incumbent Don Hamilton faced a wider field of challengers, none of which stood against him in 2010.

=== Ward 4 ===
Councillor candidate	Votes	Vote %	Election spending
Karen Rea (X)	4,754	42.89	
Carolina Moretti	3,158	28.49	
Neil Thomas	1,941	17.51	
Stephen McLeod	1,231	11.11	

Ward 4 is newly created from former parts of old Ward 4 and 6. Phil Richardson has withdrawn from the race in Ward 4.

=== Ward 5 ===
Councillor candidate	Votes	Vote %	Election spending
Colin Campbell (X)	3,527	55.21	
Raj Subramaniam	1,313	20.55	
Compass Chung	855	13.38	
John Egsgard	567	8.88	
Siva Sivagnanam	126	1.97	

Ward 5 boundaries changed from 2010 with parts of former Ward 4.

=== Ward 6 ===
Councillor candidate	Votes	Vote %	Election spending
Amanda Yeung-Collucci (X)	1,683	25.86	
Benson Lau	1,442	22.16	
Cliff Redford	1,092	16.78	
Raymond Miu	934	14.35	
Gin Siow	990	15.21	
Zach Armstrong	366	5.62	

Ward 6 is newly created from parts of old Wards 4 and 6. All new candidates as current Ward 6 councillor Alan Ho ran in the new Ward 2 and current Ward 4 Councillor Carolina Moretti ran in the new ward 4. Siow ran in the old Ward 4 in last election.

=== Ward 7 ===
Councillor candidate	Votes	Vote %	Vote Δ(%)	Election spending
Logan Kanapathi (X)	5,673	48.25	+12.04	
Khalid Usman	3,539	30.10		
Shusmita Sharma	1,308	11.12		
Sothy Sella	1,078	9.17		
Vasu Murugesu	160	1.36		

The ward boundaries were unchanged following the 2013 review. Khalid Usman is former Ward 7 councillor and ran for Ward 6 in 2010 and as regional councillor in 2006.

=== Ward 8 ===
Councillor candidate	Votes	Vote %	Election spending
Alex Chiu (X)	2,828	30.54	
Isa Lee	2,692	29.07	
Joseph (Mohan) Remisiar	2,238	24.17	
Miriam Ku	759	8.20	
Peter Deboran	743	8.02	

Ward 8 has new boundaries with parts transferred from old Wards 2 and 6.

=== Endorsements ===
==== Media ====
The Toronto Star endorsed Stephen Kotyck for Mayor

==== Community Groups ====
"Markham Residents for Responsible Community Planning" endorsed the following:

- Mayor - Frank Scarpitti
- Regional Councillors - Jim Jones, Joe Li, Peter Pavlovic, Sophia Sun
- Ward 1 - Valerie Burke
- Ward 2 - No Endorsement
- Ward 3 - Don Hamilton
- Ward 4 - Neil Thomas
- Ward 5 - John Egsgard
- Ward 6 - Cliff Redford
- Ward 7 - Logan Kanapathi
- Ward 8 - Peter Deboran

"Markham Citizens Coalition for Responsive Government" endorsed:

- Mayor - Stephen Kotyck
- Regional Councillors - Jack Heath, Jim Jones, Joe Li
- Ward 1 - Valerie Burke
- Ward 2 - Jim Kwan
- Ward 3 - Don Hamilton
- Ward 4 - Karen Rea
- Ward 5 - John Egsgard
- Ward 6 - Gin Siow
- Ward 7 - No Endorsement
- Ward 8 - Miriam Ku

== Newmarket ==
Mayoral candidate	Vote	%
Tony Van Bynen (X)	10,816	54.01
Chris Campbell	7,804	38.97
Dorian Baxter	1,407	7.03

== Richmond Hill ==
As of September 2014, incumbent mayor Barrow is in court facing conflict on interest complaint and may be removed from office if found guilty, but the ruling may not be made until after the elections in October. Perrelli is incumbent Ward 2 councillor running as mayor.

Mayoral candidate	Vote	%
Dave Barrow (X)	23,397	63.74
Carmine Perrelli	12,320	33.56
Anastasios Baxevanidis	989	2.69

== Vaughan ==
=== Mayor ===
Mayoral candidate	Vote	%
Maurizio Bevilacqua (X)	43,894	78.41
Daniel De Vito	6,792	12.13
Paul Donofrio	4,440	7.93
Savino Quatela	852	1.52

=== Regional councillors ===
Regional councillor candidate	Vote	%
Michael Di Biase (X)	29,296	21.82
Mario Ferri	27,647	20.59
Gino Rosati (X)	26, 283	19.57
Deb Schulte (X)	22,206	16.54
Richard T. Lorello	12,577	9.37
Carrie Liddy	9,602	7.15
Max Power	6,668	4.97

=== Ward councillors ===
Ward 1 candidate	Vote	%
Marilyn Iafrate (X)	5,466	42.17
Peter Meffe	3,659	28.23
Maria Gagliardi	2,294	17.70
Antony Niro	1,160	8.95
Muhammad Islam	383	2.95

Ward 2 candidate	Vote	%
Tony Carella (X)	4,964	41.42
Nick Pinto	3,567	29.76
Frank Miele	1,442	12.03
Adriano Volpentesta	1,100	9.18
Marco Villella	573	4.78
Sam Acquaviva	338	2.82

Ward 3 candidate	Vote	%
Rosanna DeFrancesca (X)	6,385	56.23
Lorenzo Catuzza	3,522	31.02
Francesco Ferraro	719	6.33
Nick Lima	384	3.38
Anthony Liberio	315	2.77

Ward 4 candidate	Vote	%
Sandra Yeung Racco (X)	3,162	52.99
Styles Q. Weinberg	2,352	39.42
Jonathan Gorenstein	453	7.59

Ward 5 candidate	Vote	%
Alan Shefman (X)	7,142	52.97
Josh Martow	6,341	47.03

== Whitchurch–Stouffville ==
Incumbent mayor Wayne Emmerson did not run in 2014. Incumbent Ward 2 councillor Bannon was a mayoral candidate.

Mayoral candidate	Vote	%
Justin Altmann	4,365	33.35
Phil Bannon	4,006	30.61
Richard Bartley	3,464	26.47
Arnold Neufeldt-Fast	1,047	8.00
Willie Reodica	205	1.57
