= Conservative Party of Canada candidates in the 2006 Canadian federal election =

The Conservative Party of Canada ran a full slate of 308 candidates in the 2006 Canadian federal election. Some of these candidates have separate biography pages; relevant information about other candidates may be found here.

The candidates are listed by province and riding name.

== Newfoundland and Labrador ==
=== Fabian Manning (Avalon) ===
Fabian Manning won in this riding he received 19,132 votes. Defeating Liberal Candidate Bill Morrow's 14,318 votes.

=== Aaron Hynes (Bonavista—Gander—Grand Falls—Windsor) ===
Aaron Hynes lost to Scott Simms of the Liberal Party of Canada. Hynes received 15,376 votes to Simms' 19,866.

=== Cyril Pelley Jr. (Humber—St. Barbe—Baie Verte) ===
Cyril Pelley, Jr. lost to incumbent Gerry Byrne of the Liberal Party of Canada. Pelley received 10,137 votes to Byrne's 17,820.

=== Joe Goudie (Labrador) ===
Goudie lost to Todd Russell of the Liberal Party of Canada, receiving 4,528 votes to Russell's 5,768.

=== Cynthia Downey (Random—Burin—St. George's) ===
Cynthia Downey lost to Bill Matthews of the Liberal Party of Canada, receiving 12,232 votes to Matthews's 13,652.

=== Norman Doyle (St. John's East) ===
Norman Doyle won in this riding he received 19,110 votes. Defeating Liberal Candidate Paul Antle's 14,345 votes.

=== Loyola Hearn (St. John's South—Mount Pearl) ===
Loyola Hearn won in this riding she received 16,644 votes. Defeating Liberal Candidate Siobhán Coady's 12,295 votes.

== Quebec ==
=== Argenteuil—Papineau—Mirabel: Suzanne Courville ===
Suzanne Courville is a sales and customer service representative. At the time of the 2006 election, she worked for a frozen food company. Elections Canada alleged in 2008 that Courville received funds that came under scrutiny in the Conservative Party's in-and-out funding scheme.

Courville sought election to municipal office in Mirabel in 2005. There was also a candidate named Suzanne Courville in the 2009 municipal election in Terrebonne, although this may have been a different person.

Electoral record
Election	Division	Party	Votes	%	Place	Winner
2005 municipal	Terrebonne Council, District Eight	n/a	273	19.96	2/2	Guy Laurin
2006 federal	Argenteuil—Papineau—Mirabel	Conservative	12,461	23.32	2/5	Mario Laframboise, Bloc Québécois

=== Bas-Richelieu—Nicolet—Bécancour: Marie-Ève Hélie-Lambert ===
Marie-Ève Hélie-Lambert was 26 years old at the time of the election, and was a Philosophy student at the University of Quebec in Trois-Rivières. She previously worked at a centre for drug addicts. She lived in the nearby Berthier-Maskinongé riding, but indicated that she did not want to oppose Marie-Claude Godue as the Conservative candidate there. Hélie-Lambert expressed interest in stopping the exodus of young people from the region, and was writing a book on the loss of collective responsibility in society. She was not right-wing in her personal views, and said that she was running for the Conservatives as a "citizen open to the world".

She received 11,588 votes (23.36%), finishing second against Bloc Québécois incumbent Louis Plamondon. Elections Canada subsequently alleged that Hélie-Lambert was one of a number of Conservative Party candidates involved in a funding scheme, wherein the central party organization transferred funds in and out of her riding to avoid spending limit restrictions.

=== Hull—Aylmer: Gilles Poirier ===
Poirier is a teacher at the Université du Québec en Outaouais, and is a former vice-president of the New Democratic Party in the riding. He nevertheless chose to run for the Conservatives in the 2006 election, during which he improved his party's showing by 9% and moved up to 3rd place in a traditionally left-wing and federalist riding. Liberal incumbent Marcel Proulx retained his seat.

=== La Pointe-de-l'Île: Christian Prévost ===
Christian Prévost's campaign literature indicated that he had experience organizing, promoting, and co-ordinating several sporting events, particularly in the field of soccer. He had previously contested the same electoral division in 2004. There is a Christian Prévost who sought election to the Montreal city council in a 2008 by-election, although this may not have been the same person.

Electoral record
Election	Division	Party	Votes	%	Place	Winner
2004 federal	La Pointe-de-l'Île	Conservative	1,961	4.24	3/5	Francine Lalonde, Bloc Québécois
2006 federal	La Pointe-de-l'Île	Conservative	7,402	15.24	2/5	Francine Lalonde, Bloc Québécois

=== Lac-Saint-Louis: Andrea Paine ===
A graduate from Concordia University with a double major in journalism and political science, she also studied civil law at Université Laval.

Prior to the 2006 election, she worked as a Legislative Assistant to the Opposition House Leader on Parliament Hill. In addition, she was the party's official spokesperson for Montreal's West Island.

She has been active in both the Conservative Party of Canada and the Quebec Liberal Party, and worked as a political aid to provincial MNAs on the West Island, as advisor or press secretary to provincial cabinet ministers of Fisheries, Education, and Transport, and as media representative during provincial referendums. She also held a position in communications for the Jean Charest leadership campaign for the Progressive Conservative Party of Canada.

Paine was Publicity Director on the West Island Women's Centre Board of Directors, and serves on the Board of Directors for both the West Island Community Resource Centre and Kuper Academy.

=== Manicouagan: Pierre Paradis ===
Pierre Paradis is a civil engineering consultant, superintendent, and project manager. In 2006, he was the commissioner of oaths for the Baie Comeau and Mingan judicial districts. He has also worked as a teacher.

Paradis was the Canadian Alliance candidate for Charlevoix in the 2000 federal election. In 2001, he joined with the rest of his riding association in leaving the Canadian Alliance for the Progressive Conservatives, citing dissatisfaction with the Alliance's leadership. The two parties later merged to form the Conservative Party of Canada, which Paradis joined. He has been a Conservative candidate in two elections.

He is not to be confused with the former Quebec cabinet minister Pierre Paradis.

Electoral record
Election	Division	Party	Votes	%	Place	Winner
2000 federal	Charlevoix	Canadian Alliance	1,905	5.72	3/5	Gérard Asselin, Bloc Québécois
2004 federal	Manicouagan	Conservative	1,601	4.92	4/5	Gérard Asselin, Bloc Québécois
2006 federal	Manicouagan	Conservative	6,910	18.98	2/6	Gérard Asselin, Bloc Québécois

=== Outremont: Daniel Fournier ===
Daniel Fournier is a prominent businessperson in Montreal. He received 5,168 votes (12.73%), finishing fourth against incumbent Liberal Party cabinet minister Jean Lapierre.

== Ontario ==
=== Ian West (Algoma—Manitoulin—Kapuskasing) ===
West entered political life as a member of the Progressive Conservative Party, and was 25 years old when he first campaigned for the PCs in the 2000 election. A graduate of the University of Windsor, he had recently completed a work term with DaimlerChrysler in Germany (Windsor Star, 31 October 2000). His campaign focused on environmental concerns, and highlighted his party's plan to eliminate Canada's debt in twenty-five years (Windsor Star, 25 November 2000). Although credited by the local media for running a solid campaign, he finished a distant fourth against longtime Liberal incumbent Herb Gray in Windsor West.

West campaigned for the Progressive Conservatives again in a 2002 by-election, after Gray retired from the House of Commons. He emphasized the environment and cross-border trade with America (Windsor Star, 17 April 2002), and again finished fourth against New Democrat Brian Masse. West later joined the Conservative Party of Canada, and was the party's candidate for Algoma—Manitoulin—Kapuskasing in the 2006 federal election. As of 2005, he is in his last year of studies at the law school at the University of Ottawa (Sudbury Star, 12 December 2005).

Electoral record
Election	Division	Party	Votes	%	Place	Winner
2000 federal	Windsor West	PC	2,116		4/6	Herb Gray, Liberal
federal by-election, 13 May 2002	Windsor West	PC	957	2.91	4/6	Brian Masse, New Democratic Party
2006 federal	Algoma—Manitoulin—Kapuskasing	Conservative	8,957		3/6	Brent St. Denis, Liberal

=== Peter Conroy (Beaches—East York) ===
Conroy was born and raised in Beaches-East York, where he attended St. Denis elementary school and Cardinal Newman Secondary School. In 1988, he led an unsuccessful attempt to stop the Newman board from mandating school uniforms (Toronto Star, 7 June 1988). After completing an Honours degree in History and Political Science at the University of Western Ontario, he worked in Ottawa for four years as an executive and legislative assistant to Liberal Member of Parliament (MP) Tom Wappel in Ottawa. He then returned to Beaches-East York to start a family and pursue a career in business. Conroy and his wife Shelley have three children: twin daughters Alexandra and Elizabeth and son Jacob. They are homeowners in the Upper Beach area.

Conroy is a founder and executive of CollectiveBid Systems Inc, through which he has launched a fixed income exchange designed to eliminate the inefficiencies in the Canadian Bond Market. He currently works for the Montreal Exchange. He is an active member of the Beaches Lions Club where he has helped to raise funds in support of local causes including Kew Play and Community Centre 55's Hamper program. Along with three friends, he has promoted a community-based business, The Christmas Tree Company, since 1992. This venture has also raised money for the Children's Wish Foundation of Canada.

Conroy was thirty-six years old in the 2006 campaign (Toronto Star, 16 July 2006). He received 9,238 votes (18.04%) in the 2006 election, finishing third against Liberal incumbent Maria Minna.

=== Peter Coy (Eglinton—Lawrence) ===
Coy was born on the Isle of Wight, England in 1951. He was a flight sergeant in the British Air Training Force at age sixteen, and flew in RAF jet trainers over Germany and England. A Business Studies graduate from Crawley College, he entered the data processing profession and studied computer programming and system design. He moved to Canada in 1974. Since 1991, he has been president of Prodigm Inc., creating system designs and software for customer sales and service systems. Coy has served as president of the Toronto Operetta Theatre, chair of the outreach and social concern committee of Grace Church on-the-Hill, vice-president of the Eglinton-Lawrence Conservative EDA, and previously vice-president of the Eglinton-Lawrence Progressive Conservative riding association. He received 14,897 votes (30.25%), finishing second against Liberal incumbent Joseph Volpe.

=== John Capobianco (Etobicoke—Lakeshore) ===
John Capobianco (born 1965) is a Canadian corporate executive and activist. He has twice been a political candidate for the Conservative Party of Canada.

Capobianco's parents immigrated from Italy in 1960. He was born and raised in Etobicoke and has undertaken a career as a consultant, rising to the position of Senior Vice President Public Affairs with Edelman Canada, one of the largest integrated communications firms.

In his political life, Capobianco has been president of the Ontario PC Youth Association. During the government of Mike Harris he worked as an advisor to then-Minister of Education David Johnson.

Capobianco ran for Parliament as a Conservative in the 2004 election, losing to Jean Augustine in Etobicoke—Lakeshore by almost 10,000 votes. He was again the Tory standard-bearer in Etobicoke—Lakeshore after defeating Morley Kells for his party's nomination and lost to Liberal candidate Michael Ignatieff in the 2006 federal election, losing by less than 5,000 votes. Both times Capobianco received the most votes of any Conservative candidate in Toronto. He is married with one child.

=== Eliot Lewis Hill (Hamilton Centre) ===
Hill is a police officer, with experience in Hamilton and Toronto. He has been also active with Habitat For Humanity, and received the Alan Ladkin Memorial trophy for community involvement in 1993. Hill worked in Toronto at the time of the election, but resided in Hamilton. He was thirty-one years old (Hamilton Spectator, 13 January 2006).

He defeated former candidate Leon Patrick O'Connor for the Conservative nomination in Hamilton Centre (Hamilton Spectator, 13 May 2005), and focused his campaign on "law and order" issues (Hamilton Spectator, 19 September 2005). He received 9,696 votes (20.29%), finishing third against New Democratic Party incumbent David Christopherson.

=== Lou Grimshaw (Kingston and the Islands) ===
Grimshaw was born in St. Catharines, Ontario. He holds a Bachelor of Arts degree in Political and Economic Science and a Master of Arts degree in War Studies, both from Royal Military College of Canada. He was a professional army officer for thirty-nine years before retiring in 1996], and received training as a paratrooper (Kingston Whig-Standard, 5 January 2006). Grimshaw saw action with NATO forces in Germany as a member of the British army, and served with the United Nations detachment in Cyprus.

He was a defense management consultant and the owner of Louis E. Grimshaw Military Antiques during the 2006 election. He has also written on military topics. In 2005, he received the Province of Ontario Volunteer Service Award.

Grimshaw was a Progressive Conservative for many years, and became president of the party's federal Kingston and the Islands association in 2002]. He supported Scott Brison's bid for the party leadership in 2003 (KWS, 2 June 2003). He later endorsed the party's merger with the Canadian Alliance in 2003-04, and was the founding association president of the resulting Conservative Party of Canada (KWS, 22 March 2004). Grimshaw has also been a church warden and member of the Synod of the Anglican Diocese of Ontario.

He won the Conservative Party nomination in May 2005, defeating Connie Wilkins and Keith Bilow (KWS, 16 May 2005). He received 16,230 votes (26.07%), finishing second against Liberal incumbent Peter Milliken.

=== Steven Cage (Kitchener Centre) ===
Steven Cage was educated at York University, receiving both his Bachelor of Business Administration and his Master of Business Administration. He is a member of the business community with more than 20 years of financial management experience and is a Fellow of the Institute of Canadian Bankers.

Cage is a public representative on the Provincial Appeals Committee of the Human Resource Professionals Association of Ontario, a director of the Confederation Club of Waterloo Region and an active member of several local business organizations. He has been a business news reader on 570AM Kitchener radio and is an occasional guest lecturer at the Richard Ivey School of Business.

Cage was active in development of the Conservative Party's policy declaration, passed in Montreal in March 2005.

=== Ajmer Mandur (Kitchener—Waterloo) ===
Ajmer Mandur is a member of the Conservative Party of Canada and has been nominated to run in the 2006 Canadian federal election in the riding of Kitchener—Waterloo.

Ajmer immigrated to Canada in 1983 with his family. He went to high school in Waterloo and then graduated from Conestoga College with a diploma in Business Administration-Materials Management.

Mandur is a small businessman that has operated two businesses in his community since 1990. He is an active member in the community and has lived in Kitchener-Waterloo since he and his family immigrated in 1983. Mandur sits on the Regional Safety and Crime Prevention Council and the Waterloo Neighbourhood Watch Board.

=== Albert Gretzky (London West) ===
Albert (Al) Gretzky (born 1942) ran as a Conservative in London West in the 2006 federal election and finished second, 1,329 votes behind incumbent Liberal Sue Barnes.

The uncle of Wayne Gretzky, he has been a resident of Byron and London West for the last 25 years. Most recently an employee of Eatons and Sears, he is active in the community, giving his time in support of such causes as the Thames Valley Children's Centre, the Canadian National Institute for the Blind, the Canada Games, and the Palace Theatre.

In 2013, Gretzky was the Freedom Party of Ontario's candidate in a provincial by-election held in London West placing fourth with 4.9% of the vote.

=== Vincent Veerasuntharam (Scarborough Southwest) ===
Veerasuntharam moved to Canada from Sri Lanka in 1983. He is president of Suvara Travels Canada Inc., and a director on the Sri Lanka Business Council. Veerasuntharam is a member of St. Bonaventure's Catholic parish in Toronto.

He drew attention to Toronto's gun violence in the 2006 campaign, and highlighted his family and religious convictions.

He received 10,017 votes (24.04%), finishing second against Wappel.

=== Kevin Serviss (Sudbury) ===
Kevin Serviss was born in Iroquois, Ontario, and raised in Guilletville near Sudbury. He moved to Hamilton as a young adult, and joined its Metropolitan Police Force in 1976. He returned to Sudbury in 1978 and worked for that city's police force until 1999, when he became a pastor at the city's Pentecostal Glad Tidings Tabernacle. He has also hosted a radio program on CJTK-FM, Sudbury's Christian station, and was a founder of the Elgin Street Mission and the Pregnancy Care Crisis Centre. He helped to organize a rally against same-sex marriage in 2005, and indicated that his belief in "traditional values" was a catalyst for his decision to run for office.

Serviss won the Conservative Party nomination in May 2005, at a meeting that was marked by some controversy. Former Conservative Party candidate Stephen L. Butcher alleged that most Serviss supporters were not members of the Conservative Party until shortly before the meeting, and that many were members of his church. He described Serviss as a special-interest candidate, who should not have been allowed to contest the nomination.

When the House of Commons of Canada granted legal sanction to same-sex marriage in June 2005, Serviss said that it was a "sad and regrettable day in Canadian history". Later, however, he indicated that he would vote "against his conscience" in support of same-sex marriage if his constituents directed him to do so.

He received 10,332 votes (21.68%), finishing third against Liberal incumbent Diane Marleau.

=== Anthony Reale (Thornhill) ===
Reale is a real estate agent by profession, and works for RE/MAX. Reale originally lost the Conservative nomination on the first ballot to former Canadian Alliance EDA President Dan Samson, but was appointed after Mr. Samson resigned the nomination in the Fall of 2005 for personal reasons (Vaughan Weekly, January 11, 2006. pg 2).

Reale was city councillor in Vaughan from 1985 to 1988. He ran for mayor in 1988, and was defeated by the then incumbent mayor Lorna Jackson.

Reale has served as the returning officer for the 1999 and 2003 provincial elections in the riding of Thornhill.

Reale ran against Liberal incumbent Susan Kadis, the New Democratic Party candidate Simon Strelchik, the Green Party of Canada candidate Lloyd Helferty, and the Progressive Canadian Party candidate Mark Abramowitz. Reale came second to Kadis, who won by 10,929 votes.

=== Lewis Reford (Toronto Centre) ===
Born in 1960 in Ottawa, Reford spent his early childhood in Australia and Egypt where his scientist father was posted. Moving back to Canada in time to start kindergarten, he spent the rest of his childhood at his family home on a farm in Quebec's Ottawa Valley, where he became fluently bilingual.

To further his CEGEP college education, Reford attended the Colorado School of Mines, where he graduated with a Bachelor of Science honours degree in geophysical engineering. A summer job with Exxon led to his first career, posting in frontier oil exploration in Perth, Western Australia, where he worked for close to two years. After that stint, he returned to the academic world to undertake post-graduate work in geology at the University of Cambridge in England.

From Cambridge, Reford embarked on a new career path in global finance, first in London with Citicorp Investment Bank, and then in Paris with energy multinational Total S.A. He met his Canadian wife, Susan, in Paris and their eldest son was born there. While based in Europe, his work took him to Latin America, the Middle East and Asia.

He returned to Canada and resided in Toronto Centre in 1993, where he worked in investment banking for Smith Barney and J.P. Morgan out of offices in Toronto and New York respectively.

=== Sam Goldstein (Trinity-Spadina) ===
Goldstein is a lawyer, a former playwright who was born in Ottawa and received his Bachelor of Arts from Carleton University before earning a Master of Arts in Political Theory from McMaster University. He then obtained his Bachelor of Laws from the University of Calgary and was called to the Ontario Bar in 1997. He is currently practicing as a defence attorney and was previously an Assistant Crown Attorney. Goldstein has been a resident of Trinity-Spadina since 1996. He is on the board of directors of the Miles Nadal Jewish Community Centre and the Downtown Jewish Community School. He was awarded the Canadian Jewish Playwrighting Award in 1991.

He received 5,625 votes (9.00%), finishing third against New Democrat Olivia Chow.

=== Richard Majkot (Vaughan) ===
Richard Majkot ran against Liberal incumbent Maurizio Bevilacqua in the 2006 federal election and was defeated.

=== Alphonso Teshuba (Windsor West) ===
Teshuba (born March 23, 1968, in Windsor) holds a Bachelor of Commerce degree from the University of Windsor. He is a Security Brokers Dealer, manages a communications and marketing business, and has been co-owner of the Nine Ball Heaven billiards and arcade club with his sister (Windsor Star, 13 June 1989). Teshuba sits on the Windsor Jewish Community Centre board of directors and strategic planning committee, and was Jordan Katz's campaign manager in the 2004 election. He was thirty-seven years old in 2006 (Windsor Star, 10 January 2006).

He received 9,592 votes (20.11%), finishing third against New Democratic Party's Brian Masse.

=== Michael Mostyn (York Centre) ===
Mostyn is currently serving as the Director of Government Relations for B'nai Brith Canada.

In 1996, Mostyn received his Bachelor of Arts (B.A.) in Philosophy from the University of Western Ontario. During his time as an undergraduate, Mostyn was a member of the Dean's Honour List, as well as a recipient of the Honour W Award. Graduated from the University of Western Ontario Law School in 1999, Mostyn was awarded the Douglas May Memorial Award, and delivered a paper at the 14th BILETA Conference: Cyberspace 1999: Crime, Criminal Justice, and the Internet at the College of Ripon and York St John, York, England while in his third year of law school.

Called to the Bar in the Province of Ontario in 2001, he practiced law at Mostyn & Mostyn, Barristers and Solicitors in the areas of civil litigation, entertainment law, criminal law, family law, and wills and estates.

He has run twice federally, in 2004 and 2006, and was defeated both times by Liberal Party of Canada candidate Ken Dryden, but had increased previous Conservative vote totals in both elections, receiving 30% of the popular vote in 2006.

He was the Progressive Conservative Party of Ontario's nominee in the provincial York Centre riding for the 2011 provincial election losing against Liberal incumbent Monte Kwinter.

== Manitoba ==
=== Churchill: Nazir Ahmad ===
Ahmad received a Bachelor of Science degree in Pakistan, and holds a Master of Science degree from the University of Reading in England. He did postgraduate work at the University of Manitoba, received Chartered Accountant certification from the Institute of Chartered Accountants of Manitoba, and is an accountant in private life. He was the mayor of Flin Flon for several years, and campaigned for the Progressive Conservative Party in the 1988 federal election.

Ahmad attended the national Progressive Conservative leadership convention of 1993 as an unpledged delegate, and was listed as 51 years old in a newspaper report (Winnipeg Free Press, 11 June 1993). He chaired Flin Flon's economic development commission in the late 1990s, and worked to diversify the local economy from its traditional reliance on smelting (WFP, 28 February 1998). In 1998, he was elected to the Red Cross council for northeast Manitoba (WFP, 27 May 1998).

He sought re-election as Mayor of Flin Flon in the 1998 municipal elections, but was defeated (WFP, 29 October 1998). As of 2006, he is a city councillor in Flin Flon and is chair of Flin Flon Housing Co. Ltd. (Seniors' Housing). He finished fourth in the 2006 election.

In 2005, Ahmad announced his support for the federal government's program to cultivate cannabis in an abandoned mine near Flin Flon (the harvested plants are used for medicinal purposes).Conservative Health Critic Steven Fletcher had previously called for the program to be shut down.

Electoral record
Election	Division	Party	Votes	%	Place	Winner
1988 Federal	Churchill	PC	5,164	20.5	3/3	Rod Murphy, New Democratic Party
1998 Municipal	Mayor of Flin Flon	No Affiliation	470	29.58	2/3	Dennis Ballard
2006 Federal	Churchill	Conservative	2,886	11.56	4/6	Tina Keeper, Liberal

=== Elmwood—Transcona: Linda West ===
West received 10,720 votes (32.13%), finishing second against New Democratic Party incumbent Bill Blaikie.

=== Winnipeg Centre: Helen Sterzer ===
Sterzer was born on July 30, 1934. She was a secretary and clerical worker from 1951 to 1957, and was a computer systems designer for Air Canada from 1957 to 1991. She ran for the House of Commons as a Reform Party candidate in 1993 and 1997, losing to veteran New Democratic Party incumbent Bill Blaikie on both occasion. In 2006, she lost to Pat Martin.

Sterzer has written several Letters to the Editor since 2005, generally on political topics. In 2006, she wrote a letter arguing that NDP leader Jack Layton was encouraging the Taliban and endangering the lives of Canadian soldiers by calling for Canada to withdraw its troops from Afghanistan. As of 2006, Sterzer was president of the Winnipeg Centre Conservative organization.

Electoral record
Election	Division	Party	Votes	%	Place	Winner
1993 federal	Winnipeg—Transcona	Reform	5,829	14.09	3/9	Bill Blaikie, New Democratic Party of Manitoba
1997 federal	Winnipeg—Transcona	Reform	5,703	17.23	3/7	Bill Blaikie, New Democratic Party of Manitoba
2006 federal	Winnipeg Centre	Conservative	5,554		3/5	Pat Martin, New Democratic Party

=== Winnipeg North: Garreth McDonald ===
McDonald joined the Manitoba Progressive Conservatives at age twelve, and served for a time as secretary of the Manitoba PC Youth Association. He first campaigned for political office in the 2003 provincial election as a candidate of the Progressive Conservative Party of Manitoba, when he was eighteen years old and still a high-school student.

He was killed in a traffic accident in October 2007, when his car sideswiped a taxi and careened into oncoming traffic, striking an SUV. A married couple was killed and Garreth later died at the hospital. He was 22 years old.

Electoral record
Election	Division	Party	Votes	%	Place	Winner
2003 provincial	Kildonan	PC	1,100		2/4	Dave Chomiak, New Democratic Party
2006 federal	Winnipeg North	Conservative	4,810	17.65	3/6	Judy Wasylycia-Leis, New Democratic Party

== Saskatchewan ==
=== Brad Farquhar (Wascana) ===
Farquhar was born in Toronto and raised in the Newmarket area in Ontario. He received a Bachelor of Arts degree at Providence College, studied political science at Carleton University, and completed a Master of Public Administration degree from Griffith University in Australia, specializing in electoral systems and administration. He worked as a Special Assistant to Elwin Hermanson, the House Leader of the Reform Party in Ottawa, and then as Executive Assistant to Hermanson, when the latter became the leader of the Saskatchewan Party and Leader of the Opposition in Saskatchewan. When Hermanson stepped down from the leadership in 2004, Farquhar became Executive Director of the Saskatchewan Party. He then worked as a consultant to political parties in Tajikistan. After returning, Farquhar won the Conservative Party nomination in Wascana. He is president of Farquhar & Associates Consulting, a business and public affairs consultancy based in Regina. He and his wife have three children. He received almost 12,000 votes, but placed second to Liberal Finance Minister Ralph Goodale.

== British Columbia ==
=== Robin Baird (Victoria) ===
Robin Baird (b. 1964, Winnipeg, Manitoba) is a Crown prosecutor and private lawyer in Victoria, British Columbia. He is authorized to practice law in French. He has graduated from the University of British Columbia with a B.A. in 1986, Queen's University with an LL.B in 1989 and London School of Economics with an LL.M in 1999. He has served on the Glenlyon Norfolk School Alumni Board (B.C.), the Mayor of Victoria's Advisory Committee on Construction of A Multiplex Facility and the St. Michaels University School Alumni Association.

=== Phil Eidsvik (Newton—North Delta) ===
Eidsvik is a commercial fisher. He has served as an executive director of the B.C. Fisheries Survival Coalition. He is a fishing activist.

=== David Matta (Surrey North) ===
Matta is an instructor at Stenberg College. He was born in Egypt but earned a master's degree in psychology at Trinity Western University. He has lived in Surrey since 1995.

=== Darrel Reid (Richmond) ===
Reid is a 48-year-old vice-president of Current Corporation making night-vision systems for the maritime and security industry. He served as president of Focus on the Family Canada between 1998-2004. He has also worked as a political staffer for the Reform Party of Canada.
