= Vaughan City Council =

Municipal governing body in Ontario, Canada

Type
- Type: City council
- Term limits: None

History
- New session started: November 15, 2022

Leadership
- Mayor of Vaughan: Steven Del Duca since November 15, 2022

Structure
- Seats: 1 Mayor; 4 Regional Councillors; 5 Ward Councillors
- Length of term: 4 years

Elections
- Last election: October 24, 2022
- Next election: 2026

Meeting place
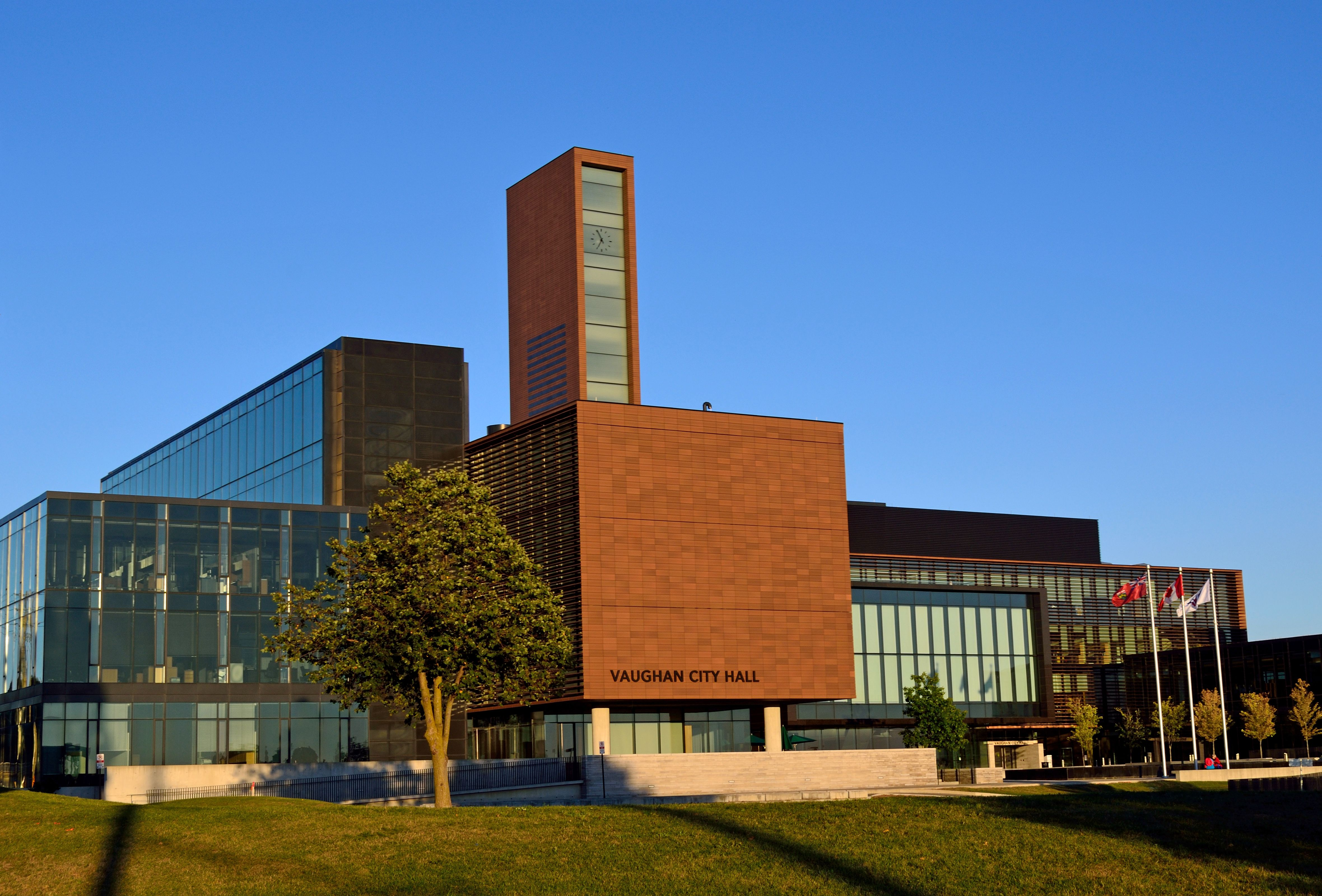
- Vaughan City Hall; Vaughan, Ontario

Website
- Vaughan City Hall

Vaughan City Council is the lower-tier municipal governing body for the city of Vaughan, Ontario. It is a part of the upper-tier Regional Municipality of York. Members of the council are elected in three categories: wards councillors, citywide councillors, and a mayor. The wards have remained consistent since the 2010 election.

== Council positions ==
=== Local and regional councillor ===
Also known as simply regional councillors, anyone filling this position not only serves the people's interest on the Vaughan City Council, they are also responsible for representing the city at the York Regional Council. The regional councillor who receives the most votes in an election is also made the deputy mayor, whose role is to represent the mayor in their absence. For the extra work they do, the deputy mayor receives a 10% higher salary compared to a councillor.

== Current council ==
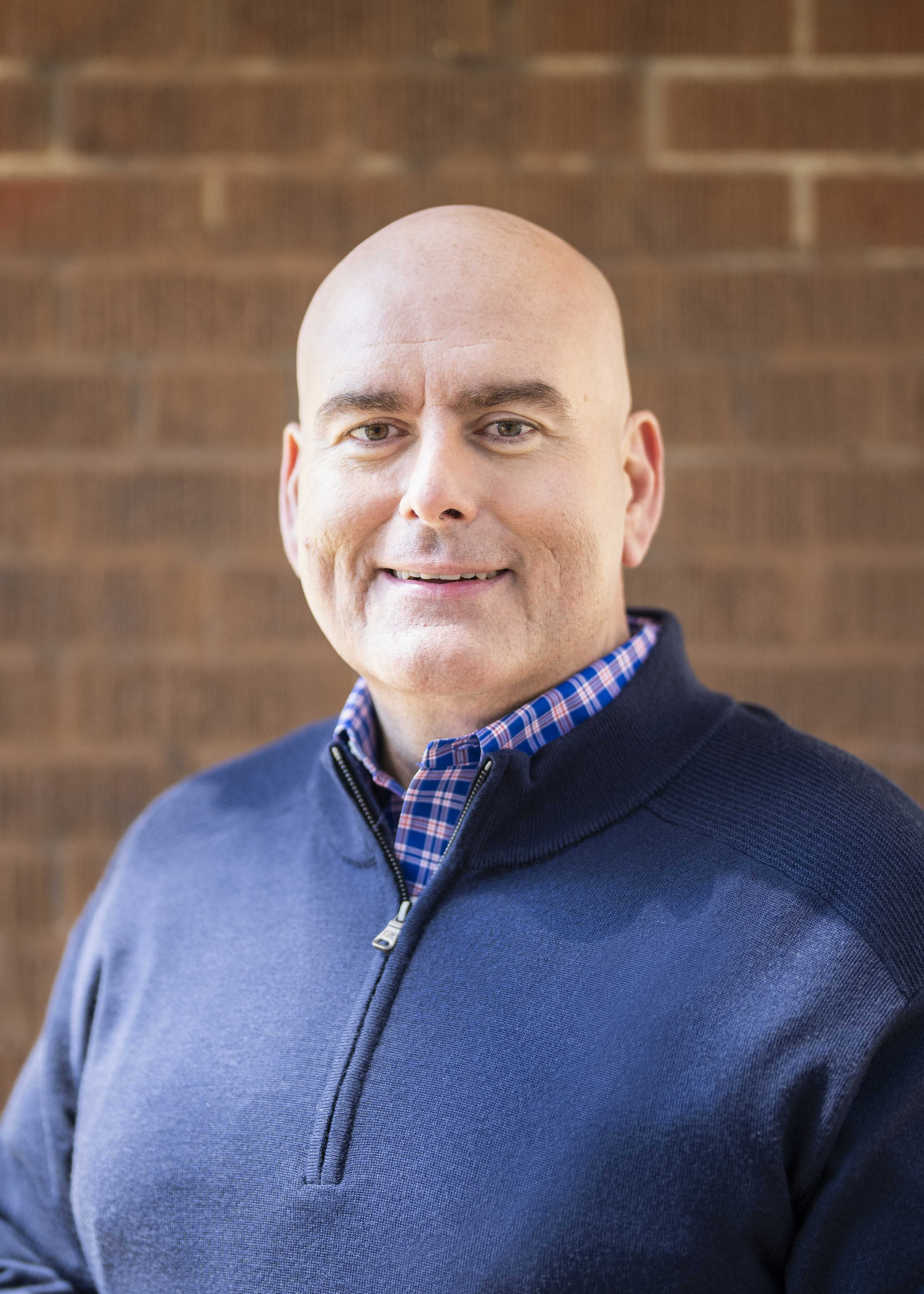
Current Mayor, Steven Del Duca

Position	Member	Communities
Mayor	Steven Del Duca	At-large
Deputy Mayor Regional Councillor	Linda Jackson	At-large
Regional Councillor	Gino Rosati	At-large
Regional Councillor	Mario Ferri	At-large
Regional Councillor	Mario Racco	At-large
Ward 1	Marilyn Iafrate	Maple/Kleinburg
Ward 2	Adriano Volpentesta	Woodbridge West
Ward 3	Rosanna DeFrancesca	Woodbridge/Vellore
Ward 4	Chris Ainsworth	Concord/Thornhill North
Ward 5	Gila Martow	Thornhill

== Vaughan City Hall ==
City council and various civic offices are housed at the Civic Centre which was designed by Kubawara, Payne, McKenna and Blumberg and opened in 2011.

Besides the main City Hall building, the complex features:

- Civic Tower with clock
- Chamber of Commerce Building
- Public library building
- Civic Square, Market and Cenotaph
- reflecting pool/skating rink
- public gardens and naturalized park

Previous civic buildings:

- Township Hall in Vellore on Lot 20 in Concession 5 (present day Weston Road between Rutherford Road and Major Mackenzie Drive) 1845–1943
- Township Hall at northeast corner of Major Mackenzie Drive and Keele Street 1943–1957
- 2141 Major Mackenzie Drive 1957-2011 (renovation in 1982)

== Previous councils ==
=== Town of Vaughan ===
1971 to 1983

Term	Reeve	Regional Councillor	Councillor
1971-1972	Garnet A. Williams	John C. Gilbert	Fred D. Armstrong; David K. Fraser; Robert A. Kirk; Robert D. McArthur; Gordon Risk
1973-1974	Garnet A. Williams	John C. Gilbert	David K. Fraser; Fred D. Armstrong; Albert D. Hollingshead; Michael R. Bevan; James M. Cameron
1975-1976	Garnet A. Williams	David K. Fraser	James M. Cameron; Lorna D. Jackson; Albert D. Hollingshead; Fred D. Armstrong; Terry H. Goodwin
1977-1978	Garnet A. Williams	David K. Fraser	James M. Cameron; Lorna D. Jackson; Albert D. Hollingshead; Terry H. Goodwin; Dario DiGiannantonio
1979-1980	Garnet A. Williams	Dario DiGiannantonio	James M. Cameron; Albert Hollingshead; Lorna D. Jackson; Raymond McAfee; Jan Poot
1981-1982	Garnet A. Williams	Lorna Jackson	Jim Cameron; Raymond McAfee; Albert Hollingshead; Jan Poot; Jim Davidson

1983 to 1991

Term	Reeve	Regional Councillor	Ward 1	Ward 2	Ward 3
1983-1985	Lorna D. Jackson	James W. Davidson	James M. Cameron	Nick DiGiovanni; William A. Cox	David Chapley; Mario Racco
1985-1988	Lorna D. Jackson	Nick A. DiGiovanni	Jim Cameron	Frank Cipollone; Michael Di Biase	David Chapley; Anthony Reale
1989-1991	Lorna D. Jackson	Michael Di Biase; David Chapley	Peter Meffe	Gino Rosati; Frank Cipollone	Mario Racco; Bernie Green

=== City of Vaughan ===
1991 to 1994

Term	Mayor	Regional Councillor	Ward 1	Ward 2	Ward 3
1991-1994	Lorna D. Jackson	Michael Di Biase; Gino Rosati	Peter Meffe	Frank Cipollone; Joyce Frustaglio	Mario Racco; Bernie Green

1994 to 2002

Term	Mayor	Regional Councillor	Ward 1 Maple/Kleinburg	Ward 2 Woodbridge West	Ward 3 Woodbridge/Vellore	Ward 4 Concord/Thornhill	Ward 5 Thornhill
1994-1997	Lorna D. Jackson	Michael Di Biase; Joyce Frustaglio	Peter Meffe	Tony Carella	Bernie Di Vona	Mario Racco	Bernie Green
1997-2000	Lorna D. Jackson	Michael Di Biase; Joyce Frustaglio	Mario Ferri	Gino Rosati	Bernie Di Vona	Mario Racco	Susan Kadis
2000-2002	Lorna D. Jackson	Michael Di Biase; Joyce Frustaglio	Mario Ferri	Gino Rosati	Bernie Di Vona	Mario Racco	Susan Kadis

2002 to 2010

Term	Mayor	Regional Councillor	Ward 1 Maple/Kleinburg	Ward 2 Woodbridge West	Ward 3 Woodbridge/Vellore	Ward 4 Concord/Thornhill	Ward 5 Thornhill
2002-2003 (Note: Di Biase named mayor on the death of Jackson. Rosati promoted to regional councillor's position. By-election elects Jackson's daughter as ward councillor.)	Michael Di Biase	Joyce Frustaglio; Gino Rosati	Mario Ferri	Linda Jackson	Bernie Di Vona	Mario Racco	Susan Kadis
2003-2004	Michael Di Biase	Mario Ferri; Linda Jackson; Joyce Frustaglio	Peter Meffe	Tony Carella	Bernie Di Vona	Sandra Yeung Racco	Susan Kadis
2004-2006 (Note: Kadis resigned after elected to federal parliament. Shefman won a by-election for the position.)	Michael Di Biase	Mario Ferri; Linda Jackson; Joyce Frustaglio	Peter Meffe	Tony Carella	Bernie Di Vona	Sandra Yeung Racco	Alan Shefman
2006-2010	Linda Jackson	Joyce Frustaglio; Mario Ferri; Gino Rosati	Peter Meffe	Tony Carella	Bernie Di Vona	Sandra Yeung Racco	Alan Shefman

2010 to 2022

Term	Mayor	Deputy Mayor	Regional Councillor	Ward 1 Maple/Kleinburg	Ward 2 Woodbridge West	Ward 3 Woodbridge/Vellore	Ward 4 Concord/Thornhill	Ward 5 Thornhill
2010-2014	Maurizio Bevilacqua	Gino Rosati	Michael Di Biase; Deb Schulte	Marilyn Iafrate	Tony Carella	Rosanna DeFrancesca	Sandra Yeung Racco	Alan Shefman
2014-2017	Maurizio Bevilacqua	Michael Di Biase	Mario Ferri; Gino Rosati	Marilyn Iafrate	Tony Carella	Rosanna DeFrancesca	Sandra Yeung Racco	Alan Shefman
2017-2018 (Note: Di Biase resigned in May, 2017 due to sexual assault complaints. Singh appointed regional councillor by council vote; Ferri named deputy mayor based on previous election)	Maurizio Bevilacqua	Mario Ferri	Gino Rosati; Sunder Singh	Marilyn Iafrate	Tony Carella	Rosanna DeFrancesca	Sandra Yeung Racco	Alan Shefman
2018–2022	Maurizio Bevilacqua	Mario Ferri	Gino Rosati; Linda Jackson	Marilyn Iafrate	Tony Carella	Rosanna DeFrancesca	Sandra Yeung Racco	Alan Shefman

2022 to present

Term	Mayor	Deputy Mayor	Regional Councillor	Ward 1 Maple/Kleinburg	Ward 2 Woodbridge West	Ward 3 Woodbridge/Vellore	Ward 4 Concord/Thornhill	Ward 5 Thornhill
2022–2026	Steven Del Duca	Linda Jackson	Mario Ferri; Gino Rosati; Mario Racco	Marilyn Iafrate	Adriano Volpentesta	Rosanna DeFrancesca	Chris Ainsworth	Gila Martow

== Controversy ==
Following the November 2006 election, former mayor Michael Di Biase appealed the results of the elections citing possible errors in the ballot counting machines. The results were reviewed following a decision in his favour in Ontario Superior Court, concluding that the original result, the election of Jackson as mayor, was the correct one.

== Mayors ==
The head of City Council is the mayor. A list of mayors and reeves of Vaughan includes:

Reeves

- Garnett A. Williams 1969–1970
- Brian Bailey 1967–1968
- Albert H. Rutherford 1961–1966
- John W. Perry 1957–1960
- Marshall McMurchy 1952–1956
- John Hostrawer 1949–1951
- Boynton Weldrick 1944–1948
- Robert W. Scott 1936–1943
- George Kellam 1931–1935
- James Henry Robson 1929–1930
- Henry Kellam 1928
- George Kellam 1927
- Thomas B. Weldrick 1925–1926
- John T. Saigeon 1922–1924
- John Whitmore 1917–1921
- Scott McNair 1915–1916
- James A. Cameron 1911–1914
- Daniel Longhouse 1909–1910
- Isaac Devins 1907–1908
- John Boyle 1905–1906
- William Watson 1903–1904
- James H. Kirby 1901–1902
- Alexander Bryson 1898–1900
- Samuel Arnold 1897
- George High 1894–1896
- Andrew Russell 1890–1893
- James McNeil 1889
- Alexander Malloy 1887–1888
- Thompson Porter 1881–1886
- William C. Patterson 1874–1880
- David Boyle 1872–1873
- Peter Patterson 1868–1871
- Henry S. Howland 1864–1867
- Robert J. Arnold 1861–1863
- Henry S. Howland 1859–1860
- David Bridgeford 1858
- John W. Gamble 1850-1857 first reeve of the Township

== Acting/Deputy Mayors ==
The position of Deputy Mayor (earlier called Acting Mayor) is based on the councillor receiving the greatest number of votes in a municipal election, and has included:

Deputy Reeves'

- Garnet A. Williams 1965–1968
- Jesse Bryson 1961–1964
- Victor B. Ryder 1959–1960
- Robert A. Kirk 1957–1958
- Albert H. Rutherford 1952–1956, 1969–1970
- Marshall McMurchy 1949–1951
- John Hostrawser 1944–1948
- Boynton Weldrick 1936–1943
- Robert W. Scott 1935
- Robert Dooks 1931–1934
- Thomas Baker 1929–1930
- Arthur Farr 1927–1928
- James Henry Robson 1925–1928
- Thomas B. Weldrick 1922–1924
- George Kellam 1922–1926
- William O. McDonald 1921
- Walter Anderson 1919–1920
- John T. Saigeon 1917–1918, 1921, 1929–1931
- John Whitmore 1915–1916
- Scott McNair 1911–1914
- James A. Cameron 1909–1910
- Daniel Longhouse 1907–1908
- William Watson 1898
- James H. Kirby 1897–1898
- Alexander Bryson 1894–1897
- Samuel Arnold 1890–1896
- George High 1887–1893
- Andrew Russell 1887–1889
- Isaac Reaman 1886–1888
- George Elliott 1886
- Alexander Malloy 1884–1886
- Thomas Webster 1882–1883
- William Cook 1881–1885
- Damiel Reaman 1879–1885
- Isaac Nattress 1879–1881
- John L. Card 1878, 1880
- Daniel Kinnee 1877–1878
- Isaac Chapman 1875–1876
- N. Clarke Wallace 1874–1879
- Thomas Webster 1872–1877
- Thompson Porter 1871–1873
- David Boyle 1870–1871
- William Hartman 1868–1869
- Robert J. Arnold 1867–1870
- Thomas Grahame 1865–1867
- William Cook 1861, 1863
- Alfred Jeffery 1858–1860, 1862, 1864
- David Smellie 1851–1853
