= Deb Schulte =

Canadian politician

The Honourable Deb Schulte PC
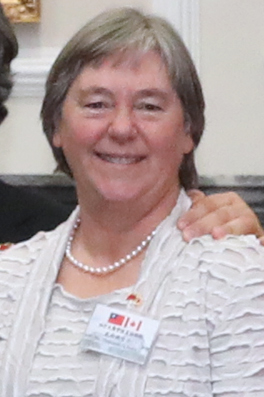

Minister of Seniors
- In office November 20, 2019 – October 26, 2021
- Prime Minister: Justin Trudeau
- Preceded by: Filomena Tassi
- Succeeded by: Kamal Khera

Member of Parliament for King—Vaughan
- In office October 19, 2015 – September 20, 2021
- Preceded by: riding created
- Succeeded by: Anna Roberts

Parliamentary Secretary to the Minister of National Revenue
- In office August 31, 2018 – September 11, 2019
- Minister: Diane Lebouthillier
- Preceded by: Kamal Khera

Chair of the Standing Committee on Environment and Sustainable Development
- In office February 4, 2016 – September 19, 2018
- Preceded by: Harold Albrecht
- Succeeded by: John Aldag

York Regional Councillor for the City of Vaughan
- In office December 1, 2010 – December 1, 2014

Personal details
- Born: 1960 (age 65–66)
- Party: Liberal
- Spouse: David Schenck
- Education: Mechanical and Aerospace Engineering at Princeton University

Deborah Schulte PC (born 1960) is a former Canadian politician who represented the riding of King—Vaughan in the House of Commons of Canada from 2015 to 2021. A graduate of Princeton University, Schulte has a degree in mechanical and aerospace engineering. She is a former Minister of Seniors.

== Background ==
From 2010-2014, she served as a Local and Regional Councillor for the City of Vaughan, Ontario, serving on both Vaughan City Council and York Regional Council. Prior to entering politics, Schulte worked for Bombardier Aerospace in management for twenty-two years. Prior to entering politics, she was a well-known community activist. She lives in Vaughan with her husband Dave and their two sons, Daniel and Derek.

== Offices and Roles as a Parliamentarian ==
Parliamentary Secretary to the Minister of National Revenue.

== Committees ==
Parliamentary Secretary — Non-Voting Member Standing Committee on Finance

== Parliamentary Associations and Interparliamentary Groups ==
Executive Member of the Canadian Branch of the Commonwealth Parliamentary Association and Canada-Italy Interparliamentary Group. Member of the Canada-Europe Parliamentary Association, Canada-United Kingdom Inter-Parliamentary Association, Canada-United States Inter-Parliamentary Group, Canadian Branch of the Commonwealth Parliamentary Association, Canadian Delegation to the Organization for Security and Co-operation in Europe Parliamentary Assembly, Canadian Group of the Inter-Parliamentary Union, Canadian NATO Parliamentary Association and Canadian Section of ParlAmericas.

== Private Members Motions ==
During the 42nd Parliament, 1st Session, Member of Parliament Deb Schulte drafted Bill M-64 (Italian Heritage Month) in 2016 and it was passed on May 17, 2017. The text of the motion states that, in the opinion of the House, the government should recognize the contributions that Italian-Canadians have made to Canadian society, the richness of the Italian language and culture, and the importance of educating and reflecting upon Italian heritage for future generations by declaring June, every year, Italian Heritage Month.

== Electoral record ==
=== Federal ===
2019 Canadian federal election: King—Vaughan
Party	Candidate	Votes	%	±%	Expenditures
Liberal	Deb Schulte	28,725	45.00	-2.38	$95,558.89
Conservative	Anna Roberts	27,584	43.20	-1.00	$61,976.67
New Democratic	Emilio Bernardo-Ciddio	4,297	6.70	+0.17	none listed
Green	Ann Raney	2,511	3.90	+2.00	$16,180.64
People's	Anton Strgacic	731	1.10	+1.10	$1,568.81
Total valid votes/expense limit		63,848	100.0		
Total rejected ballots		598	0.93		
Turnout		64,446	64.94		
Eligible voters		99,246			
Liberal hold		Swing		-1.38	
Source: Elections Canada

2015 Canadian federal election
Party	Candidate	Votes	%	±%	Expenditures
Liberal	Deb Schulte	25,938	47.40	+19.90	–
Conservative	Konstantin Toubis	24,170	44.17	-12.95	–
New Democratic	Natalie Rizzo	3,571	6.53	-5.78	–
Green	Ann Raney	1,037	1.90	-0.84	–
Total valid votes/Expense limit		54,716	100.00		$221,143.16
Total rejected ballots		–	–	–	
Turnout		–	–	–	
Eligible voters		83,550			
Source: Elections Canada

=== Municipal ===
2014 Vaughan election, Local & Regional Councillor
Candidate	Votes	%
Michael Di Biase (X)	29,296	21.82
Mario Ferri	27,647	20.59
Gino Rosati (X)	26, 283	19.57
Deb Schulte (X)	22,206	16.54
Richard T. Lorello	12,577	9.37
Carrie Liddy	9,602	7.15
Max Power	6,668	4.97

2010 Vaughan election, Local & Regional Councillor
Candidate	Votes	%
Gino Rosati (incumbent)	21 284	12.65
Michael Di Biase	20 668	12.29
Deb Schulte	20 593	12.24
Mario Ferri (incumbent)	20 149	11.98
Robert Craig	18 361	10.92
Joyce Frustaglio (incumbent)	18 331	10.90
Richard T. Lorello	16 183	9.62
Joanna Cacciola-Lionti	8 828	5.25
Domenic De Luca	8 188	4.87
John R. Harvey	5 336	3.17
Carrie Liddy	4 886	2.90
Mario Di Nardo	4 147	2.47
Krystof Klabouch	1 243	0.74

2006 Vaughan election, Ward 2
Candidate	Votes	%
Tony Carella (incumbent)	6 359	43.6
Frank Cipollone	3 786	25.9
Deb Schulte	2 751	18.9
Aurelio E. Acquaviva	907	6.2
Mario Di Nardo	486	3.3
Paul Donofrio	291	2.0
