= Steven Del Duca =

Canadian politician (born 1973)

His Worship the Honourable Steven Del Duca ECO
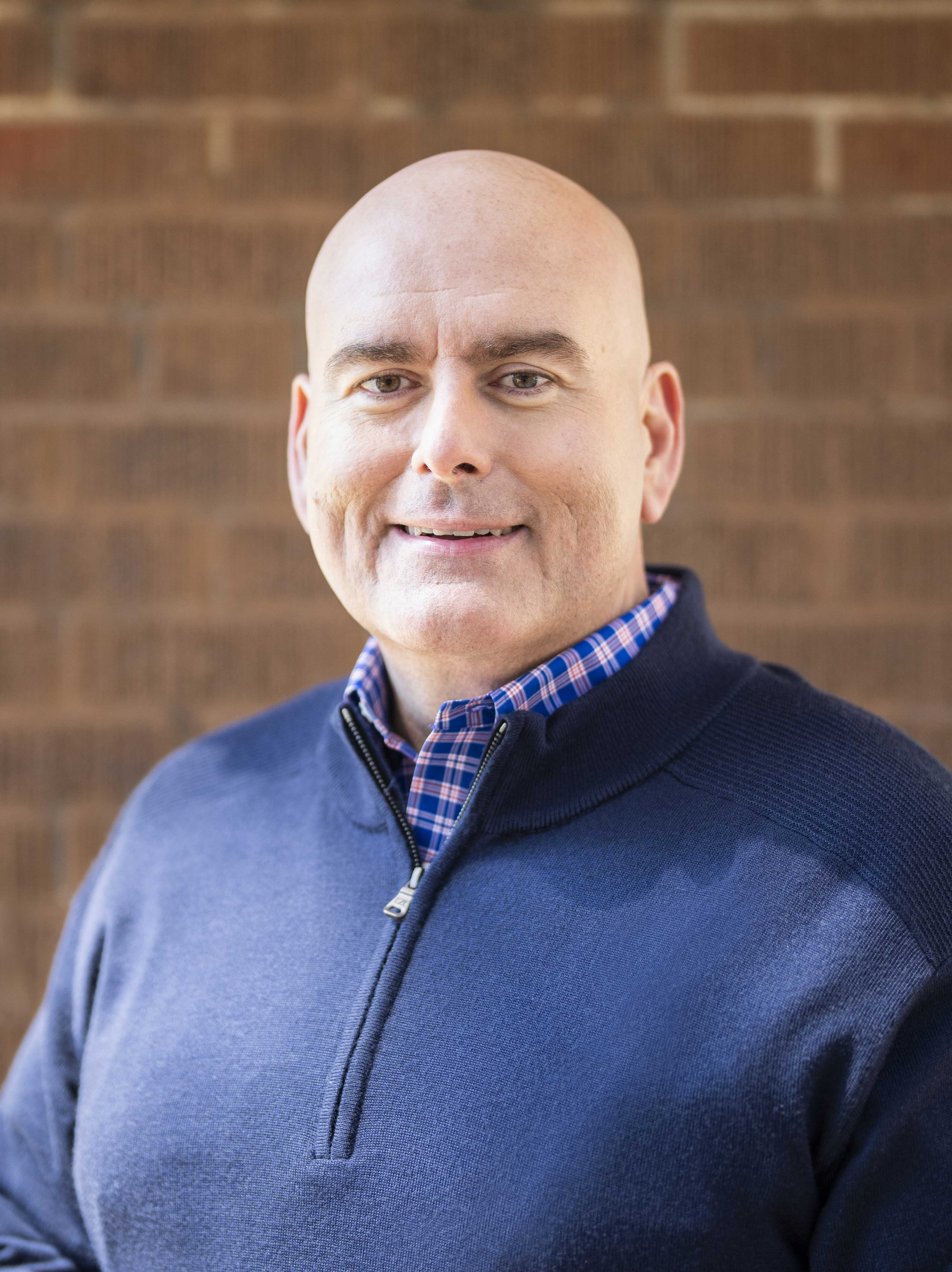
- Del Duca in 2022

York Regional Chairman
- Incumbent
- Assumed office November 15, 2026
- Appointed by: Rob Flack
- Preceded by: Eric Jolliffe

5th Mayor of Vaughan
- Incumbent
- Assumed office November 15, 2022
- Deputy: Linda Jackson
- Preceded by: Maurizio Bevilacqua

Leader of the Ontario Liberal Party
- In office March 7, 2020 – August 3, 2022
- Preceded by: John Fraser (interim)
- Succeeded by: John Fraser (interim)

Ontario Minister of Economic Development and Growth
- In office January 17, 2018 – June 29, 2018
- Premier: Kathleen Wynne
- Preceded by: Brad Duguid
- Succeeded by: Jim Wilson

Ontario Minister of Transportation
- In office June 24, 2014 – January 17, 2018
- Premier: Kathleen Wynne
- Preceded by: Glen Murray
- Succeeded by: Kathryn McGarry

Member of Provincial Parliament for Vaughan
- In office September 6, 2012 – June 7, 2018
- Preceded by: Greg Sorbara
- Succeeded by: Michael Tibollo (Vaughan—Woodbridge)

Personal details
- Born: Steven Alfonso Del Duca; July 7, 1973 (age 53) Etobicoke, Ontario, Canada
- Party: Independent (Note: Municipal politicians in Ontario are elected on a non-partisan basis.) (municipal)
- Other political affiliations: Ontario Liberal
- Spouse: Utilia Amaral
- Children: 2
- Occupation: Union administrator

Steven Alfonso Del Duca (born July 7, 1973) is a Canadian politician who has been serving as the mayor of Vaughan since 2022 and was appointed York regional chairman in 2026. Del Duca previously served as the leader of the Ontario Liberal Party from 2020 to 2022 and was an Ontario cabinet minister from 2014 to 2018, first as the minister of transportation and then as the minister of economic development. He represented the riding of Vaughan in the Ontario Legislative Assembly from 2012 to 2018. On October 24, 2022, he was elected the mayor of Vaughan, taking office on November 15.

== Early and personal life ==
Steven Alfonso Del Duca was born on July 7, 1973, in Etobicoke, Ontario. He is a first-generation Canadian, born to an Italian father and a Scottish mother. His paternal grandfather immigrated to Canada from Terelle, Italy in 1951, while his father Benny immigrated to Canada seven years later in 1958, both working in the construction industry. His mother Margaret immigrated from Scotland to Canada in 1961.

Del Duca has cited his grandparents as key influences on his political career, stating, "Ontario and Canada gave them a ton of opportunity. I grew up believing… you have to be dedicated, sacrifice, all those important things. But the other half of the bargain is that this province, this country are supposed to give you real opportunity."

He lives with his wife, Utilia Amaral, and their two daughters, in Woodbridge, Ontario. Del Duca's younger brother, Michael, was killed in a car crash in June 2018.

== Education and early career ==
Del Duca studied political science and Canadian history at the University of Toronto and Carleton University before earning a law degree from Osgoode Hall Law School. He was not called to the bar in Ontario and has not practiced law.

Del Duca founded a local group called Go Vote Vaughan in 2006 in an effort to boost voter turnout in his hometown's municipal elections and worked on a city task force for democratic reform at a time when Vaughan's local government had a reputation for dysfunction.

In 2008, Del Duca served as the fundraising chair for the Annual Vaughan Hospital Fundraising Gala that raised over $1 million. He worked with all levels of government, community leaders and organizations to establish the Greater Toronto Region Economic Summit, which took place in May 2009.

Del Duca has worked as an executive assistant to MPP Greg Sorbara and was the director of public affairs for the Carpenters' District Council of Ontario before he was elected in 2012.

== Political career ==
=== Member of Provincial Parliament and cabinet minister ===
In 2012, he ran as the Liberal candidate in the riding of Vaughan, in a by-election called to replace Greg Sorbara who retired earlier in the year. He defeated the Progressive Conservative (PC) candidate Tony Genco. He was re-elected in the 2014 provincial election defeating PC candidate Peter Meffe.

On June 24, 2014, he was named to cabinet by Premier Kathleen Wynne as the minister of transportation. In 2014, as the Minister of Transportation, he allocated $29 billion dedicated to transit and transportation in the GTA over 10 years.

In June 2016, the Ministry of Transportation issued a press release about twelve new stations for the GO Transit network, only ten of which had been approved by the Metrolinx board planning the regional transit projects. The board convened in late June to approve the two additional stations, Kirby GO Station for the Barrie line, and Lawrence East station as part of the SmartTrack project. Metrolinx reports stated that the Kirby station would have a negative effect on overall ridership on the line.

Del Duca defended the decision stating that Metrolinx's original analysis didn't take into account the explosive population growth planned in Vaughan and Etobicoke, and the transit needs that would accompany this growth. He also noted that a similar economic assessment done by Toronto staff gave the Toronto Relief Line a negative score despite an expert consensus that the project was needed to meet Toronto’s long-term transit needs.

In January 2018, Del Duca left his position as minister of transportation and took over the Ministry of Economic Development and Growth.

During the June 2018 election, Del Duca ran for the Ontario Liberal Party in the provincial election for Vaughan–Woodbridge, and lost to PC Candidate Michael Tibollo. Del Duca was amongst a wave of Ontario Liberal Party MPPs who lost their seat during that election, removing the Liberal Party from government and relegating them to the third party in Ontario's legislature. After losing his seat, Del Duca taught a course at York University from January to April 2019.

Weeks after losing his provincial seat, it was reported that Del Duca would be running to be regional chair of York Region in the October 22, 2018, municipal election, but owing to the provincial government's passing of the Better Local Government Act, there was no election for the post.

=== Ontario Liberal leader ===
On April 3, 2019, Del Duca announced that he would enter the 2020 Ontario Liberal Party leadership election. On March 7, 2020, he won the election with 58.8 per cent of the ballot vote, having received 1,258 delegate votes. Under his leadership, the Ontario Liberals have retired their $10 million debt from the 2018 election and nominated an equal slate of male and female candidates across the province.

He focused his time on publicly-funded education, health care, a clean, safe and healthy environment, and economic dignity. Key commitments include a plan to end for-profit long-term care and adopt a "home-care first" approach to seniors' care, a portable benefits package for Ontario workers, and a ban on handguns across the province. Del Duca also announced that the Ontario Liberal Party would work to provide equal pay and opportunity for women, create five new provincial parks, fight systemic racism in schools and policing, and boost Old Age Security payments.

==== 2022 Ontario general election ====
Del Duca ran in the riding of Vaughan—Woodbridge in the 2022 Ontario general election. After failing to win the seat, Del Duca announced his pending resignation as party leader. His resignation took effect on August 3 with the appointment of John Fraser to serve as the interim leader.

=== Mayor of Vaughan ===
In August 2022, Del Duca announced he would run for mayor of Vaughan. On October 24, 2022, he was narrowly elected the 5th mayor of Vaughan, defeating Sandra Yeung Racco. He took office on November 15.

Del Duca served as mayor of Vaughan during the 2022 Vaughan shooting, where six people (including the gunman) were killed and one was injured. Del Duca also attended the candlelight vigil held for the victims of the shooting.

In October 2024, Del Duca and Prime Minister Justin Trudeau signed a $59M deal with to build 1,700 homes over three years, and 40,000 homes over a decade, under the Housing Accelerator Fund.

In March 2024, he proposed to ban protests near places of worship, schools and hospitals. Anyone who violates the proposed bylaw could be fined up to $100,000.

In the city's finances, Del Duca proposed a 3% property tax increase in 2024 and 2025.

Mayor Del Duca was re-elected mayor of Vaughan by a wide margin in 2026, defeating Shelly-Ann Starlette Cerrelli.

In November 2026, Mayor Del Duca released a statement condemning antisemitism with other Italian Canadian business and community leaders, including Stephen Lecce, a Member of Provincial Parliament, Frank Scarpitti, Mayor of Markham, and Steve Pellegrini, Mayor of King, referencing the Christie Pits riot of 1933.

=== Chair of York Region ===
On November 10, 2026, Minister of Municipal Affairs and Housing of Ontario, Rob Flack announced the appointment of Del Duca as Chair of York Region for the 2026–2030 term. This appointment was made under the Better Regional Governance Act, 2026, under which the provincial government was empowered to appoint the heads of council of several upper-tier municipalities in Ontario.

Del Duca's appointment allows him to serve simultaneously as York Regional Chair and Mayor of Vaughan. He confirmed that he would continue in both positions during the 2026–2030 municipal term.

The decision was criticized by Markham Mayor Frank Scarpitti, who expressed concern about the possible conflict of interest in having the municipal mayor also serve as the regional chair. Scarpitti voiced his concern about the consolidation of power in the hands of the regional chair.

== Electoral record ==
2022 Vaughan mayoral election

Mayoral candidate	Vote	%
Steven Del Duca	22,699	38.06%
Sandra Yeung Racco	21,848	36.64%
Danny DeSantis	7591	12.72%
Paul Donofrio	2697	4.52%
Lino Mancinella	2427	4.07%
Parveen Bola	1492	2.50%
Robert Gulassarian	880	1.48%

2022 Ontario general election: Vaughan—Woodbridge
Party	Candidate	Votes	%	±%
Progressive Conservative	Michael Tibollo	19,340	53.78	+3.29
Liberal	Steven Del Duca	12,615	35.08	+3.08
New Democratic	Will McCarty	1,927	5.36	−9.20
New Blue	Luca Mele	802	2.23	
Green	Philip James Piluris	694	1.93	−0.33
Ontario Party	Gerrard Fortin	304	0.85	
Populist	Mario Greco	249	0.69	
Moderate	Walid Omrani	27	0.08	
Total valid votes		35,958	100.0	
Total rejected, unmarked, and declined ballots		242		
Turnout		36,200	44.03	
Eligible voters		81,090		
Progressive Conservative hold		Swing		+0.10
Source(s): "Summary of Valid Votes Cast for Each Candidate" (PDF). Elections Ontario. 2022. Archived from the original on May 18, 2023.; "Statistical Summary by Electoral District" (PDF). Elections Ontario. 2022. Archived from the original on May 21, 2023.

2018 Ontario general election: Vaughan—Woodbridge
Party	Candidate	Votes	%	±%
Progressive Conservative	Michael Tibollo	21,687	50.50	+23.49
Liberal	Steven Del Duca	13,742	32.00	-25.99
New Democratic	Sandra Lozano	6,254	14.56	+3.60
Green	Michael DiPasquale	972	2.26	+0.06
Libertarian	Paolo Fabrizio	291	0.68	
Total valid votes		42,946	100.0	
Progressive Conservative pickup new district.				
Source: Elections Ontario

2014 Ontario general election
Party	Candidate	Votes	%	±%
Liberal	Steven Del Duca	33,545	55.99	+4.62
Progressive Conservative	Peter Meffe	16,654	27.80	-5.49
New Democratic	Marco Coletta	7,105	11.86	+0.48
Green	Matthew Pankhurst	1,336	2.23	+0.47
Libertarian	Paolo Fabrizio	1,277	2.13	+1.19
Total valid votes		59,917	100.0	
Liberal hold		Swing		+5.06
Source: Elections Ontario

Ontario provincial by-election, September 6, 2012 Resignation of Greg Sorbara
Party	Candidate	Votes	%	±%
Liberal	Steven Del Duca	16,469	51.37	-1.65
Progressive Conservative	Tony Genco	10,674	33.29	+2.05
New Democratic	Paul Donofrio	3,647	11.38	+0.05
Green	Paula Conning	564	1.76	+0.35
Libertarian	Paolo Fabrizio	300	0.94	-0.94
Family Coalition	Bart Wysokinski	144	0.45	
Independent	Stephen Tonner	118	0.37	
Freedom	Erin Goodwin	90	0.28	
People's	Phil Sarazen	54	0.17	
Total valid votes		32,060	100.00	
Total rejected, unmarked and declined ballots		301	0.93	
Turnout		32,361	25.62	
Eligible voters		126,323		
Liberal hold		Swing		-1.85
Source: Elections Ontario

== Notes ==
Wynne ministry, Province of Ontario (2013–2018)
Cabinet posts (2)
Predecessor	Office	Successor
Brad Duguid	Minister of Economic Development and Growth; 2018	Jim Wilson
Glen Murray	Minister of Transportation; 2014–2018	Kathryn McGarry
