= Tina Molinari =

Canadian politician

The Honourable Tina Molinari ECO

Member of the Ontario Provincial Parliament for Thornhill
- In office 1999–2003
- Preceded by: Riding established
- Succeeded by: Mario Racco

Personal details
- Born: October 25, 1956 (age 69) Toronto, Ontario
- Party: Progressive Conservative
- Children: 2
- Occupation: Justice of the peace

Tina R. Molinari (born October 25, 1956) is a former politician in Ontario, Canada. She was a Progressive Conservative member of the Legislative Assembly of Ontario from 1999 to 2003, serving as an associate minister and member of the Cabinet in the government of Ernie Eves. As of 2007, she works as a Justice of the Peace.

== School trustee ==
Molinari served as president of a local Parent Teacher Association, and was elected to the York Catholic District School Board in 1988. She served as chair of the board from 1994 to 1998, and was also given a Catholic School Trustees Association Trustee Award of Merit in 1998.

== Provincial politics ==
Molinari was elected to the Ontario legislature in the provincial election of 1999, defeating Liberal candidate Dan Ronen in the riding of Thornhill. Molinari's bid for election was almost derailed early in the campaign when one of her pollsters asked constituents how they felt about being represented by a candidate who was the son of a Holocaust survivor (Ronen's father had survived internment at Auschwitz, and Thornhill has a large Orthodox Jewish population). She overcame this controversy, however, and defeated Ronen by 343 votes.

Ernie Eves replaced Mike Harris as Premier of Ontario on April 15, 2002, and he appointed Molinari as an Associate Minister of Municipal Affairs and Housing with responsibility for urban affairs.

There were some who believed that Molinari would be re-elected in the provincial election of 2003, because of her party's support for a tax credit to parents who send their children to private or denominational schools. This issue was important to some members of Toronto's Jewish community, and Dan Ronen even chose to endorse Molinari for re-election because of her party's stand on this single issue.

While she polled better than most other Tories in the Greater Toronto Area, Molinari was not able to overcome a provincial shift to the Liberals and lost to local councillor Mario Racco by 796 votes.

== Later life ==
In 2004, Molinari was appointed to a post in Catholic Missions in Canada. Some regarded this appointment as controversial, given Molinari's pro-choice views on abortion. She has organized and hosted an annual fundraiser to raise funds for Catholic Missions within Canada.

Molinari campaigned for the Ward Four council seat in the 2006 Vaughan municipal election, and lost to Sandra Yeung Racco, the wife of the former Thornhill MPP who unseated Molinari in 2003.

On May 18, 2007, Ontario's Attorney General Michael Bryant announced Molinari's appointment as a justice of the peace.
