= 2010 York Region municipal elections =

Elections in the Regional Municipality of York of Ontario, Canada were held on 25 October 2010 in conjunction with municipal elections across the province. The results below are unofficial, pending review from the respective clerk's office for each municipality. Each elected representative becomes a member of York Regional Council.

== York Regional Council ==
Position	Representing	Councillor	Notes
Chair		Bill Fisch	selected by Council
Councillor	Aurora	Geoff Dawe	Mayor of Aurora
Councillor	East Gwillimbury	Virginia Hackson	Mayor of East Gwillimbury
Councillor	Georgina	Robert Grossi	Mayor of Georgina
Councillor	Georgina	Danny Wheeler	
Councillor	King	Steve Pellegrini	Mayor of King
Councillor	Markham	Frank Scarpitti	Mayor of Markham
Councillor	Markham	Jack Heath	
Councillor	Markham	Jim Jones	
Councillor	Markham	Gordon Landon	
Councillor	Markham	Joe Li	
Councillor	Newmarket	Tony Van Bynen	Mayor of Newmarket
Councillor	Newmarket	John Taylor	
Councillor	Richmond Hill	Dave Barrow	Mayor of Richmond Hill
Councillor	Richmond Hill	Vito Spatafora	
Councillor	Richmond Hill	Brenda Hogg	
Councillor	Vaughan	Maurizio Bevilacqua	Mayor of Vaughan
Councillor	Vaughan	Gino Rosati	
Councillor	Vaughan	Michael Di Biase	
Councillor	Vaughan	Deb Schulte	
Councillor	Whitchurch-Stouffville	Wayne Emmerson	Mayor of Whitchurch-Stouffville

== Aurora ==
Mayoral Candidate	Vote	%
Geoff Dawe	7,254	55.1
Phyllis M. Morris (X)	2,805	21.3
Nigel Kean	2,239	17.0
Roger Clowater	652	5.0
Miroslav Prikryl	218	1.7

== East Gwillimbury ==
Mayoral Candidate	Vote	%
Virginia Hackson	3,776	59.7
Jack W. Hauseman	1,964	31.0
Matthew C. Teeple	587	9.3

== Georgina ==
Mayoral Candidate	Vote	%
Robert Grossi (X)	6,151	52.9
Peter Juras	3,983	34.3
Dave G. Pollock	1,012	8.7
Ken Craine	475	4.1

== King ==
The official results for King were declared on 28 October 2010. Of eligible voters, 49.94% cast a ballot.

Mayoral Candidate	Vote	%
Steve Pellegrini	3,627	48.8
Margaret Black (X)	3,050	41.1
Gordon Craig	456	6.1
Jeff Laidlaw	296	4.0

== Markham ==
2010 Markham municipal election
- October 2010
- Turnout: 64,135

=== Results ===
The following results are unofficial pending any recounts for closes races.

==== Mayor ====
Candidate	Vote	%
Frank Scarpitti (incumbent)	54,660	85.23
Stephen Kotyck	5,566	8.68
Partap Dua	3,909	6.09

==== Regional councillor ====
Candidate	Vote	%
Jack Heath (incumbent)	37,364	20.08
Jim Jones (incumbent)	27,715	14.89
Gordon Landon (incumbent)	27,461	14.76
Joe Li	26,764	14.38
Nirmala Armstrong	23,160	12.44
Dan Horchik	20,870	11.21
Peter Pavlovic	17,101	9.19
Sunny Deol	8,573	4.61
Surinder Issar	5,670	3.05

Heath, Jones and Landon were incumbent members of Regional Council. Jones is a former Progressive Conservative MP and Town Councillor. Landon is an incumbent member and longtime Regional Councillor. Horchik was incumbent Ward 6 Town Councillor. Heath was former Ward 5 Town Councillor.

Joseph Virgilio, who was appointed to council to replace the late Tony C. Wong, did not run in 2010.

Li has previously run for council in 2006. He ran as a Conservative candidate in the federal riding of Markham- Unionville in 2006 and 2004 and as a Progressive Conservative candidate in the federal riding of Scarborough—Rouge River in 1997.

==== Ward 1 ====
Candidate	Vote
Valerie Burke (incumbent)	4,142
Jim Common	1,005
Mitch Klinger	109

Burke has been councillor since 2006 and was former executive assistant to York Regional Council.

==== Ward 2 ====
Incumbent councillor Erin Shapero decided not to run for re-election.

Candidate	Vote
Howard Shore	1928
Gary Kay	1072
Peter Usprech	255
Marlene Gallyot	680
Ali Majidi	77

==== Ward 3 ====
Candidate	Vote
Don Hamilton (incumbent)	5,310
John Cabrelli	2,586
Gohar Jadoon	109

Hamilton won the by-election in 2009 to replace Joseph Virgilio, who left to become York Regional Councillor in 2009 following the death of Tony C. Wong.

==== Ward 4 ====
Candidate	Vote
Carolina Moretti (incumbent)	4,803
Gin Siow	3,201
Nadeem Qureshi	702

==== Ward 5 ====
Candidate	Vote
Colin Campbell	5,285
John Webster (incumbent)	4,671

Webster is a lifelong resident with family history in Markham and seeking a third term. Webster is also Markham's Town Crier.

Longtime Markham resident Hamilton is acting Chief Officer with the Toronto Fire Services.

==== Ward 6 ====
Incumbent Dan Horchik sought a seat as Regional Councillor.

Candidate	Vote
Alan Ho	1,915
Jim Kwan	1,710
David Papadimitrou	1,552
Khalid Usman	1,413
Meg Stokes	1,078

Usman is former Ward 7 councillor 1998-2006 (left to run as Regional Councillor) and ran as a Liberal in the provincial election in 1995. Kwan former candidate for Ward 6 in 2006.

==== Ward 7 ====
Candidate	Vote
Logan Kanapathi (incumbent)	4,027
Debbie Wong	3,168
Adnan Khan	1,173
Raman Virk	1,100
Mohammed Rahman	1,050
Inderjit Basra	393
Senthil Varatharajah	210

Kanapathi was first elected in 2006 when former councillor Khalid Usman ran for Regional Council.

==== Ward 8 ====
Candidate	Vote
Alex Chiu (incumbent)	3,458
Joseph (Mohan) Remisiar	2,274
Ivy Lee	1,716
Bhopinder Mancoo	349

Chiu is longtime Ward 8 councillor and was Ward 7 councillor before the re-division created new wards for Miliken Mills. Chiu has been in elected office since 1986 and is also a retailer at Market Village Mall.

== Newmarket ==
Mayoral Candidate	Vote	%
Tony Van Bynen (X)	13,768	81.0
Michael Casicone	3,231	19.0

Van Bynen won his second term as mayor and has been in elected office in Newmarket since 2000.

== Richmond Hill ==
=== Mayor ===
Mayoral Candidate	Vote	%
Dave Barrow (X)	27,567	89.8
Abu Alam	3,132	10.2

=== Regional councillor ===
Two regional council seats were contested in Richmond Hill.

Candidate	Vote	%
Brenda Hogg (X)	15889	34.19%
Vito Spatafora (X)	16734	36.01%
David L. Cohen	13845	29.79%

Cohen is former Ward 3 councillor.

=== Town Council ===
The incumbents of four of the six wards were challenged for council seats.

Ward 1 - Wilcox Lake, Bond Lake, Oak Ridges, Quaker

Candidate	Vote	%
Greg Beros (X)	2113	44.76%
Carrie Hoffelner	1965	41.62%
Jose Souto	307	6.5%
Adam Matanovic	171	3.62%
Adam Dodwell	165	3.5%

Ward 2 - Newkirk, Leno Park, Town Park

Candidate	Vote	%
Carmine Perrelli (X)	1590	37.15%
Brian Hatt	854	19.95%
Karen Gelineau	604	14.11%
Marianne Yake	533	12.45%
Mahdieh Hajighazi	369	8.62%
Ehsan Haghi	330	7.71%

Incumbent councillor Arnie Warner did not run for re-election.

Ward 3 - Helmkay Park, Headford

Candidate	Vote	%
Castro Liu (X)	2061	38.3%
Thomas Chong	833	15.48%
Lidia Kafieh	697	12.95%
Vik Gandhi	618	11.48%
Sarkis Assadourian	519	9.65%
Mehrdad Sabouhi	471	8.75%
Justin Lee	182	3.38%

Incumbent councillor Cohen ran for Regional Council. Gandhi ran in 2006 in Ward 3. Assadourian is a former Liberal MPP. Liu is a broadcaster with Fairchild Radio.

Ward 4 - Jefferson, Elgin Mills

Candidate	Vote	%
Lynn Foster (X)	3553	65.65%
Angel Freedman	1859	34.35%

Ward 5 - Yongehurst, Beverley Arces, Richvale

Candidate	Vote	%
Nick Papa (X)	3572	57.18%
Karen Cilevitz	2146	34.35%
Bruce Kurta	337	5.39%
Christopher Dimpopoulos	192	3.07%

Ward 6 - West Beaver Creek, East Beaver Creek

Candidate	Vote	%
Godwin Chan (X)	3722	72.29%
Frank Mastroianni	1063	20.64%
Sheeraz Hudda	364	7.07%

== Vaughan ==
Mayoral Candidate	Vote	%
Maurizio Bevilacqua	45,054	64.1
Linda D. Jackson (X)	10,169	14.5
Mario Racco	10,134	14.4
Paul Donofrio	1,553	2.2
Tony Lorini	1,301	1.9
David Natale	931	1.3
Tony Lombardi	839	1.2
Savino Quatela	252	0.4

== Whitchurch–Stouffville ==
Mayoral Candidate	Vote	%
Wayne Emmerson (X)	4,178	39.9
Justin Altmann	3,113	30.0
Sue Sherban	3,064	29.2
Christine Vlachos	129	1.2
