= Maurizio Bevilacqua =

Canadian politician (born 1960)

The Honourable Maurizio Bevilacqua PC

4th Mayor of Vaughan
- In office December 1, 2010 – November 15, 2022
- Deputy: Gino Rosati (2010–2014); Michael Di Biase (2014–2017); Mario Ferri (2017–2022)
- Preceded by: Linda Jackson
- Succeeded by: Steven Del Duca
Chrétien Cabinet
Secretary of State (International Financial Institutions)
In office May 26, 2002 – December 12, 2003
| Prime Minister | Jean Chrétien |
| Minister | Paul Martin; John Manley |
| Preceded by | John McCallum |
| Succeeded by | Denis Paradis (as minister of State (Financial Institutions)) |
Secretary of State (Science, Research & Development)
In office January 15, 2002 – May 25, 2002
| Prime Minister | Jean Chrétien |
| Minister | Allan Rock |
| Preceded by | Gilbert Normand |
| Succeeded by | Rey Pagtakhan |
Parliamentary constituencies
Member of Parliament for Vaughan (Vaughan—King—Aurora; 1997–2004)
In office June 2, 1997 – September 2, 2010
| Preceded by | Riding established |
| Succeeded by | Julian Fantino |
Member of Parliament for York North
In office December 10, 1990 – June 2, 1997
| Preceded by | Himself |
| Succeeded by | Karen Kraft Sloan |
In office November 21, 1988 – June 7, 1990
| Preceded by | Tony Roman |
| Succeeded by | Himself |

Personal details
- Born: June 1, 1960 (age 66) Sulmona, Italy
- Citizenship: Canada; Italy
- Party: Independent
- Other political affiliations: Liberal
- Profession: Consultant

Maurizio Bevilacqua PC (Italian: [mauˈrittsjo beviˈlakkwa]; born June 1, 1960) is a Canadian politician who served as the fourth mayor of Vaughan from 2010 to 2022. He was a Liberal member of Parliament (MP) from 1988 to 2010 and was one of eleven candidates for the 2006 leadership contest, but dropped out of the race on August 14, 2006. He has been described in the media as a "right-of-centre, business friendly Liberal".

He resigned his seat in the House of Commons of Canada and announced on September 3, 2010, that he would be a candidate for mayor of Vaughan. On October 25, he was elected mayor.

== Early life ==
Born in Sulmona, Italy, he arrived in Canada in 1970 at the age of 10. As a youth, he attended Emery Collegiate and received a Bachelor of Arts from York University. He has two children, Jean-Paul and Victoria.

== Politics ==
He first got involved in party politics by working as a staffer for Sergio Marchi, and would later participate in student politics at York University.

Bevilacqua ran as the Liberal candidate in the 1988 federal election in the riding of York North. Following a judicial recount, the Progressive Conservative candidate, Michael O'Brien, was declared the winner and served 55 days as the member of Parliament for York North. In January 1989, however, the decision was overturned on appeal and Bevilacqua was declared elected by 77 votes. He served until the Supreme Court of Ontario annulled the results due to voting irregularities in May 1990, leaving the seat vacant. Bevilacqua won the 1990 by-election in York North by over 7,000 votes.

Bevilacqua represented the districts of York North (1988–1997), Vaughan—King—Aurora (1997–2004) and Vaughan (2004–2010). He is a former secretary of state (Science, Research and Development) and (International Financial Institutions). He is also a former parliamentary secretary to the minister of Labour (Human Resources Development) and to the Minister of Employment and Immigration (Human Resources Development). He was formerly a consultant.

He was the longtime chair of the Commons finance committee. While a fiscal conservative, Bevilacqua has supported same-sex marriage.

== 2006 Liberal leadership bid ==
On April 19, 2006, he declared his candidacy for the leadership of the Liberal Party, joining Martha Hall Findlay, Michael Ignatieff, and Stéphane Dion as official entrants into the leadership race. His supporters included MPs Gerry Byrne and Roy Cullen, former Cabinet minister Roy MacLaren and former party pollster Michael Marzolini. Bevilacqua also attracted the support of former Chrétien organizers Tennio Evangelista, Jeff Angel and Jeff Smith. His campaign for the Liberal Party leadership was not successful and he dropped out of the race on August 14, 2006 to support fellow Liberal Party leadership candidate Bob Rae.

== Mayor of Vaughan (2010–2022) ==
Bevilacqua announced in early September 2010 that he was running in the 2010 Vaughan municipal election for the position of mayor. The announcement came shortly after his resignation as member of Parliament for Vaughan.

He defeated controversial incumbent Linda Jackson, the former mayor who was still facing charges from election finance irregularities stemming from her 2006 mayoral victory.

Bevilacqua was re-elected mayor of Vaughan in 2014 and again in 2018, both times with greater than seventy percent of the vote.

On June 1, 2022, Bevilacqua announced he would not be seeking re-election in the 2022 election and later endorsed Steven Del Duca to succeed him.

== Electoral record ==
=== Federal ===
1988 Canadian federal election: York North
| Party | Candidate | Votes |
|---|---|---|
| Liberal | Maurizio Bevilacqua | 37,513 |
| Progressive Conservative | Micheal O'Brien | 37,436 |
| New Democratic | Evelyn Buck | 11,583 |
| Libertarian | Chris Edwards | 1,293 |

Canadian federal by-election, December 10, 1990: York North Bevilacqua's 1988 election declared void and invalid on July 6, 1990
| Party | Candidate | Votes | % | ±% |
|---|---|---|---|---|
| Liberal | Maurizio Bevilacqua | 21,332 | 49.90% | |
| New Democratic | Peter Devita | 14,321 | 33.50% | |
| Progressive Conservative | Micheal O'Brien | 4,618 | 10.80% | |
| Christian Heritage | William Ubbens | 1,399 | 3.27% | |
| Libertarian | Roma Kelembet | 424 | 0.99% | |
| Independent | David M. Shelley | 239 | 0.56% | |
| Independent | Adelchi Di Palma | 163 | 0.38% | |
| Independent | Paul Wizman | 156 | 0.36% | |
| Independent | John Turmel | 97 | 0.23% | |
| Total valid votes | | 42,749 | 100.0 | |

1993 Canadian federal election: York North
| Party | Candidate | Votes | % | ±% |
|---|---|---|---|---|
| Liberal | Maurizio Bevilacqua | 71,223 | 63.22 | |
| Reform | Heather Sinclair | 20,135 | 17.87 | |
| Progressive Conservative | Dario D'Angela | 15,451 | 13.71 | |
| New Democratic | Peter M.A. Devita | 2,996 | 2.66 | |
| National | Ben Kestein | 1,271 | 1.13 | |
| Libertarian | Robert Ede | 913 | 0.81 | |
| Natural Law | Wayne Foster | 676 | 0.60 | |
| Difference | | 51,088 | 45.35 | |
| Turnout | | 112,665 | | |

=== Municipal ===
Source for results:

| Mayoral candidate | Vote | % |
|---|---|---|
| Maurizio Bevilacqua (X) | 37,072 | 70.70 |
| Frank Miele | 13,690 | 26.11 |
| Savino Quatela | 1,671 | 3.19 |

| Mayoral candidate | Vote | % |
|---|---|---|
| Maurizio Bevilacqua (X) | 43,894 | 78.41 |
| Daniel De Vito | 6,792 | 12.13 |
| Paul Donofrio | 4,440 | 7.93 |
| Savino Quatela | 852 | 1.52 |

| Mayoral Candidate | Vote | % |
|---|---|---|
| Maurizio Bevilacqua | 45,054 | 64.1 |
| Linda D. Jackson (X) | 10,169 | 14.5 |
| Mario Racco | 10,134 | 14.4 |
| Paul Donofrio | 1,553 | 2.2 |
| Tony Lorini | 1,301 | 1.9 |
| David Natale | 931 | 1.3 |
| Tony Lombardi | 839 | 1.2 |
| Savino Quatela | 252 | 0.4 |

26th Canadian Ministry (1993–2003) – Cabinet of Jean Chrétien
Sub-Cabinet Posts (2)
| Predecessor | Title | Successor |
|---|---|---|
| John McCallum | Secretary of State (International Financial Institutions) (2002-2003) | Denis Paradis as Minister of State |
| Gilbert Normand | Secretary of State (Science, Research & Development) (2002) | Rey Pagtakhan |
