= Susan Kadis =

Canadian politician (born 1953)

The Honourable Susan Kadis

Member of Parliament

Member of Parliament for Thornhill
- In office 2004–2008
- Preceded by: Elinor Caplan
- Succeeded by: Peter Kent

Personal details
- Born: January 11, 1953 (age 73) Toronto, Ontario, Canada
- Party: Liberal
- Profession: Newspaper publisher, volunteer worker

Susan R. Kadis (born January 11, 1953) is a former politician in Ontario, Canada. She was the Liberal Member of Parliament for Thornhill in the House of Commons of Canada from 2004-08.

== Background ==
Born in Toronto, Ontario, she received a Bachelor of Sociology from York University. A breast cancer survivor, she has served on the board of directors of the Canadian Breast Cancer Foundation.

In the late 1980s, Kadis was appointed as co-chair of a community group called Parents Advocating Student Success. She called for a provincial investigation into the practices of the York Board of Education and sought help from Ontario Education Minister Sean Conway. She claimed the board was anti-Semitic, based on allegations that there were a disproportionate number of students of the Jewish faith who failed a grade, including her own son. She succeeded in getting the province to investigate. As a result, the province then retested the students that had originally failed a grade.

In 1995, she started a local newspaper called the Thornhill Times that published for one year, closing in 1996. She is a cousin of Lorne Michaels, the executive producer and creator of Saturday Night Live.

== Political career ==
=== Municipal ===
In 1988 Kadis was elected as a York School Board Trustee. She served as a school board trustee in Vaughan from 1988 to 1994. From 1997 to 2004, she was a municipal councillor.

=== Provincial ===
Kadis ran for the provincial Liberal Party nomination for the riding of Thornhill in 2003, but was defeated by fellow municipal councillor Mario Racco.

=== Federal ===
She was elected to the House of Commons as a Liberal candidate in the 2004 federal election on June 28, 2004, in the Greater Toronto Area (GTA) riding of Thornhill. She officially resigned her position as city councillor after being elected. During that session of Parliament, Kadis was elected chair of the Liberal Party's GTA caucus as well as chair of the standing committee on the status of women. One of her accomplishments as MP was successfully introducing a bill that created a national Alzheimer's strategy.

In May 2005, the Liberal Women's Caucus criticized some opposition Conservative members for making sexist remarks regarding Belinda Stronach's defection to the Liberal party. Kadis said "...criticism is expected, understandable. Sexism is not. The bottom line is that Ms. Stronach's statements were not gender-based, but the response, disappointingly, was very much overtly gender-based." She also appeared in an interview, defending Governor General Michaëlle Jean against allegations of separatism.

Kadis had announced that she would be endorsing MP Michael Ignatieff for the 2006 Liberal leadership election and had been appointed as his GTA co-chair for his campaign. However, on October 11, Kadis, a member of both the Liberal Parliamentarians for Israel and Canada Israel Friendship Group, withdrew her support over comments made by Ignatieff on the war in Lebanon. She later endorsed Bob Rae and, following Rae's loss on the 3rd ballot, she endorsed Stéphane Dion.

In the 2006 federal election, Kadis was re-elected as the MP in Thornhill with 53% of the vote. Kadis obtained 29,934 votes, achieving about 11,000 votes over any other candidate. During her time in opposition, she served as associate critic for infrastructure and communities and later as critic for science and research. She served as Vice-Chair of the Public Safety and Security Committee.

Kadis was appointed to the Caucus Committee on Economic Prosperity and Vice Chair of the Health Committee after Stéphane Dion's election as party leader. In addition, she was appointed the chair of a Task Force on Cultural Communities-at-Risk. She was not included in Dion's Shadow Cabinet until January 23, 2008, when she was appointed Critic for National Revenue. In the 2008 federal election, she was defeated by Conservative candidate Peter Kent by more than 5,200 votes.

=== Endorsements ===
Kadis endorsed Vaughan, Ontario Mayor Michael Di Biase in his unsuccessful bid for re-election during the 2006 Vaughan municipal election.

Kadis endorsed a number of candidates in the 2007 Ontario general election. She endorsed former Thornhill Liberal MPP Mario Racco in his unsuccessful bid for re-election and successful Richmond Hill Liberal candidate Reza Moridi. She endorsed successful Progressive Conservative candidate Gila Martow in the 2014 provincial by-election and again endorsed her in her successful bid for re-election in the 2014 Ontario general election.
