= York Regional Council =

Political body for York, Ontario, Canada

York Regional Council is the political body for the Regional Municipality of York in Ontario, Canada. Created in 1970, it consists of 21 locally elected representatives and the regional chair, who is appointed by the provincial government. The elected members are the mayors of each of its nine municipalities (Aurora, East Gwillimbury, Georgina, King, Newmarket, Markham, Richmond Hill, Vaughan, and Whitchurch-Stouffville), as well as an additional eleven regional councillors from the more populous municipalities—four from Markham, three from Vaughan, two from Richmond Hill and one each from Georgina and Newmarket. These members are elected via double direct election, serving as both members of regional council for their municipality and as at-large members of their city/town council.

The regional chair is appointed by the provincial government and is the head of council and chief executive officer of the regional government. Until 2022 the position was elected by the members of regional council. The first regional chair, Garfield Wright, was appointed by the provincial government upon the creation of York Region and served for two terms (1971–1978). Steven Del Duca was appointed as regional chair in 2026.

Regional Council usually meets on the third Thursday of each month at 9:30 a.m. at the York Region Administrative Centre offices in Newmarket.

== Membership ==
=== 2022-2026 Regional Council ===
Elected in the 2022 York Region municipal elections.

Chair and CEO:

- Wayne Emmerson (2022-2024)
- John Taylor (2024, interim)
- Eric Jolliffe (2025-)

Municipality	Representatives	
Municipality	Mayor	Regional councillors
Aurora	Tom Mrakas	None
East Gwillimbury	Virginia Hackson	None
Georgina	Margaret Quirk	One: Naomi Davison
King	Steven Pelligrini	None
Markham	Frank Scarpitti	Four: Michael Chan, Alan Ho, Jim Jones, Joe Li
Newmarket	John Taylor	One: Tom Vegh
Richmond Hill	David West	Two: Joe DiPaola, Godwin Chan
Vaughan	Steven Del Duca	Four: Linda D. Jackson, Mario Ferri, Gino Rosati, Mario Racco
Whitchurch-Stouffville	Iain Lovatt	None

=== 2018-2022 Regional Council ===
The chairman and CEO for this term is Wayne Emmerson.

Municipality	Representatives	
Municipality	Mayor	Regional councillors
Aurora	Tom Mrakas	None
East Gwillimbury	Virginia Hackson	None
Georgina	Margaret Quirk	One: Rob Grossi
King	Steven Pelligrini	None
Markham	Frank Scarpitti	Four: Don Hamilton, Jack Heath, Jim Jones, Joe Li
Newmarket	John Taylor	One: Tom Vegh
Richmond Hill	Dave Barrow	Two: Joe DiPaola, Carmine Perelli
Vaughan	Maurizio Bevilacqua	Three: Mario Ferri, Linda D. Jackson, Gino Rosati
Whitchurch-Stouffville	Iain Lovatt	None

=== 2014-2018 Regional Council ===
The chair and CEO of York Regional Council is Wayne Emmerson, who was elected by a majority of York Region Councillors on December 11, 2014.

Municipality	Representatives	
Municipality	Mayor	Regional councillors
Aurora	Geoffrey Dawe	None
East Gwillimbury	Virginia Hackson	None
Georgina	Margaret Quirk	One: Danny Wheeler (2014-2016); Naomi Davison (2016-2018)
King	Steven Pelligrini	None
Markham	Frank Scarpitti	Four: Jack Heath, Jim Jones, Nirmala Armstrong, and Joe Li
Newmarket	A.J (Tony) Van Bynen	One: John Taylor
Richmond Hill	Dave Barrow	Two: Brenda Hogg, Vito Spatafora
Vaughan	Maurizio Bevilacqua	Three: Michael Di Biase (2014-2017); Sunder Singh (2017-present), Mario Ferri and Gino Rosati
Whitchurch-Stouffville	Justin Altmann	None

=== 2010-2014 Regional Council ===
The chair and CEO of York Regional Council was Bill Fisch.

Municipality	Representatives	
Municipality	Mayor	Regional councillors
Aurora	Geoffrey Dawe	None
East Gwillimbury	Virginia Hackson	None
Georgina	Robert Grossi	One - Danny Wheeler
King	Steven Pelligrini	None
Markham	Frank Scarpitti	Four - Jack Heath, Jim Jones, Gordon Landon, and Joe Li
Newmarket	Tony Van Bynen	One - John Taylor
Richmond Hill	Dave Barrow	Two - Brenda Hogg, Vito Spatafora
Vaughan	Maurizio Bevilacqua	Three - Michael DiBiase, Gino Rosati, and Deb Schulte
Whitchurch-Stouffville	Wayne Emmerson	None

== Regional Committees ==
There is no executive committee, instead ideas are brought forward in Regional Committees and voted upon by the council.

- Accessibility Advisory Committee
- Audit Committee
- Community Services and Housing Committee
- Environmental Services Committee
- Finance and Administration Committee
- Planning and Economic Development Committee
- Transportation Services Committee

== Boards, Subcommittees and Task Forces ==
- Canadian National Exhibition (CNE)
- Character Community Foundation of York Region
- Don Watershed Regeneration Council
- Greater Toronto Airports Authority (GTAA)
- Greater Toronto Marketing Alliance
- GTA Agricultural Action Committee
- Housing York Inc
- Human Services Planning Board
- Humber Watershed Alliance
- Lake Simcoe Region Conservation Authority
- Markham Stouffville Hospital
- Rouge Park Alliance Executive
- Royal Agricultural Winter Fair
- Southlake Regional Health Centre
- Toronto and Region Conservation Authority
- York Region Abuse Program
- York Region Community Partnership Council
- York Region Rapid Transit Corporation
- York Regional Police Services Board

== Services ==
Services under the region's scope include:

- Children Services
- Community Planning
- Construction
- Corporate Services
- Economic Strategy and Tourism
- Emergency Medical Services - York Region EMS - downloaded from the Province of Ontario
- Environmental
- Financial Department
- Forestry
- Housing
- Infrastructure Planning Branch
- Legal Services
- Long Term Care and Seniors
- Public Health and Safety
- Real Estate
- Planning Services
- Regional Property Taxes
- York Region Tourism
- Transportation Services - regional roads only
- Sewers
- Employment and Financial Support
- Transit - York Region Transit and VIVA
- Water - water source via Toronto Water
- Waste management (garbage, recycling, hazardous waste; excludes curbside collection)
- Policing - York Regional Police

== Regional Chairs ==
The Regional Chair is the CEO of the Region and serves, ex officio, on all Committees. The position replaced the former Warden of York County (1850-1970) and is, as of 2022, selected by the provincial government.

Regional Chair	Term of Office	Notes
Garfield Wright	1971-1978	Former Town Councillor (1958-1961), Deputy Reeve (1961-1962) and Reeve (1964-1969) of East Gwillimbury; Former Warden of York County (1968-1970); Appointed Regional Chair by Lieutenant-Governor in Council. Died 2009.
Bob Forhan	1978-1984	Former hockey player and high school teacher; Town Councillor and Mayor of Newmarket (1971-1978); CAO of York Region (1978-1996) Died 2018.
Tony Roman	1984	Township Councillor (1966-1968), Regional Councillor and Mayor (1970-1984 and 1988-1992) of Markham, Federal Member of Parliament for York North (1984-1988). Died 1992.
Eldred R. King	1984-1997	Vice Chair and Chair of GO Transit, member of the Markham Township School Board (1965-1969) and councillor on Markham Township Council (1969-1970), member of Whitchurch-Stouffville Township Council (1971-1977) and Mayor of the Town of Whitchurch-Stouffville (1978-1984). Died 2011.
Bill Fisch	1997–2014	Lawyer, formerly practicing in Thornhill, Ontario (1976-1997); Former Councillor, Ward 7 (1988-1994) and Regional Councillor (1994-1997) for Markham.
Wayne Emmerson	2014–2024	Former Town Councillor (1998-1994) and Mayor (1997-2014) of Whitchurch-Stouffville.
Eric Jolliffe	2024–2026	Appointed by Premier Doug Ford's government. Former chief of the York Regional Police.
Steven Del Duca	2026–	Appointed by Premier Doug Ford's government. Mayor of Vaughan since 2022. Former leader of the Ontario Liberal Party and former provincial cabinet minister.

== Former Regional Councillors ==
Regional Councillor	Term of Office	Notes
Ronald Moran	1972-1991	Former Deputy Mayor of Markham; died 2013.
Donald Cousens	1994-2006	former mayor of Markham and MPP, died 2017.
Tony Roman	1971-1984 and 1988-1992	former mayor of Markham and Regional Chair, died 1992.
Tony Wong	2006-2009	former Markham Town Councillor, died 2009.

== York Region Administrative Centre ==
York Regional Council main operations are located at 17250 Yonge Street in Newmarket. The four-floor complex was designed by Canadian architect Douglas Cardinal and opened in 1992. It features an organic building shape with various towers located at the end. The main entrance features two clock towers.

Before 1992, Council sat at 50 Eagle Street, which is now home of the Newmarket Courthouse. The administration offices were located at 62 Bayview Parkway, which was built from 1954 to 1957 for York County and used by the region from 1971 to 1994. The old regional offices are being demolished in 2022.

A new 8 storey glass annex by WZMH Architects has been built to consolidate several rented facilities and also to house the Newmarket Courthouse.
