= Mario Racco =

Canadian politician

Vaughan Local and Regional Councillor
- Incumbent
- Assumed office November 15, 2022
- Preceded by: Position established

Member of the Ontario Provincial Parliament for Thornhill
- In office October 2, 2003 – October 9, 2007
- Preceded by: Tina Molinari
- Succeeded by: Peter Shurman

Vaughan City Councillor for Ward 4 Concord/Thornhill
- In office December 1, 1982 – October 2, 2003
- Preceded by: Ward established
- Succeeded by: Sandra Yeung Racco

Personal details
- Born: May 13, 1955 (age 71) Siderno, Italy
- Party: Independent (1982-2003, 2022-present)
- Other political affiliations: Liberal (2003-2022)
- Spouse: Sandra Yeung Racco
- Children: 2
- Occupation: Bookkeeper

Mario G. Racco (born May 13, 1955) is a politician in Ontario, Canada currently serving as a Local and Regional Councillor in the City of Vaughan since November 15, 2022. He was an Ontario Liberal Party member of the Legislative Assembly of Ontario from 2003 to 2007 who represented the Greater Toronto Area riding of Thornhill.

== Background ==
Racco has a diploma in Accounting and Finance from Ryerson Polytechnical Institute (1977) and York University. He also received a Bachelor of Business degree from York University in 1981. Racco practiced with the Chartered Accountant firms of Thorne Riddell and Dunwoody Chartered Accountants. On December 12, 2012, Racco became a member of the Law Society of Ontario.

In 2013, ‘Racco Parkway’ in Thornhill was named after him for his dedication and public service to the city.

He is married to Sandra Yeung Racco, a former city Councillor in the city of Vaughan for Ward 4 (formerly held by her husband for 6 terms). They have two children, Alexander and Katrina.

== Politics ==
Racco was elected to the city council of Vaughan, Ontario in 1982, after a recount proved that there were missing uncounted ballots. In 1985, Racco ran for regional councillor and was defeated. Racco would run again for his previous seat of Ward 4 in 1989 and successfully reclaimed it, retaining this position until his election to the Ontario legislature.

He ran for the federal Liberal nomination in Markham—Whitchurch—Stouffville in 1993, but lost to Jag Bhaduria.

In the 2003 provincial election, Racco defeated Susan Kadis for the Liberal nomination in Thornhill and ran against Tina Molinari, an incumbent from the Progressive Conservatives. Denominational education was a leading issue in this campaign, with Molinari supporting the extension of tax credits for religious education and Racco opposing it; some members of Thornhill's Orthodox Jewish community supported Molinari because of this issue. Racco eventually won by 796 votes. On March 6, 2006, he was appointed as Parliamentary Assistant to the Minister of Labour.

Racco was a leading supporter of allowing municipalities to use red light camera technology for safety purposes. In 2004, he was the driving force behind the construction of a new statue of Pierre Trudeau in Vaughan.

During the provincial election of 2007, Racco was defeated by Progressive Conservative candidate Peter Shurman. In one of the most hotly contested races in the province, Shurman came out with 1,733 votes more than Racco.

In 2010, Racco ran for Mayor of Vaughan against incumbent Mayor Linda Jackson and former MP Maurizio Bevilacqua. Racco would lose coming in third, 35 votes behind incumbent Mayor Linda Jackson for second place (0.1%).

In a 2013 by-election and the 2014 Ontario general election, Racco's wife, Sandra Yeung Racco ran for the Ontario Liberal Party in Thornhill but was defeated both times by Gila Martow.

In 2015 Racco planned to seek the federal liberal nomination in the riding of King-Vaughan, but would withdraw with complaints about the nomination process, after the deadline for the race was called without warning and much earlier than previously planned.

Return to Politics

On October 24, 2022, Racco was elected as one of four Local and Regional Councillors in the City of Vaughan.

Since being elected Racco has been one of few members on council (in some cases the only) to oppose many proposed high density housing projects across the city. In 2024, Racco put forward a motion making December Christian Heritage Month in the City of Vaughan. The motion passed unanimously. During the 2026 sitting of council in September of that year, Racco put forward a motion calling for a one year moratorium on AI data centres in Vaughan. The motion did not get a seconder and therefore did not move to a record vote.

Weston Downs

After being elected in 2022, Councilor Racco has done a large number of things for the community of Weston Downs, which is a predominately middle class neighbourhood within Woodbridge. This includes: Opposing plans to have a YRT bus route through the neighbourhood, Getting policed involved to stop illegal car rallies that had been occurring in the community for around four years and opposing a high density housing project at chrislea and 400 (being one of only two councilor to vote against the project).

== Electoral record ==
Four to be elected.

Council candidate	Vote	%
Linda D. Jackson (X)	34,763	17.54
Mario Ferri (X)	32,901	16.60
Gino Rosati (X)	32,638	16.46
Mario G. Racco (X)	29,888	15.08
Mario Di Nardo	18,517	9.34
Alex Nascimben	13,758	6.94
Mandy Rai	11,760	5.93
Fitz-Roy Gordon	9,104	4.59
Bob Santos	8,490	4.28
Alireza Siadatan	6,426	3.24

Council candidate	Vote	%
Linda D. Jackson (X)	28,398	17.08
Mario Ferri (X)	27,937	16.80
Gino Rosati (X)	27,457	16.51
Mario G. Racco	19,564	11.77
Nick Pinto	18,467	11.11
Carrie Liddy	12,502	7.52
Mario Di Nardo	12,298	7.40
John Santoro	10,113	6.08
Mandy Rai	9,524	5.73

2003 Ontario general election
Party	Candidate	Votes	%	±%
Liberal	Mario Racco	21,419	46.90	-0.46
Progressive Conservative	Tina Molinari	20,623	45.16	-3.05
New Democratic	Laurie Orrett	2,616	5.73	+2.19
Green	Bridget Haworth	705	1.54	+0.65
Freedom	Lindsay G. King	304	0.67	
Total valid votes		45,667	100.00	
