= Lorna Jackson =

Canadian politician (1935–2002)

1st Mayor of Vaughan
- In office 1983–2002
- Succeeded by: Michael Di Biase

Vaughan Regional Councillor Acting Mayor
- In office 1981–1982
- Preceded by: Garnet Williams
- Succeeded by: Michael DiBiase

Personal details
- Born: October 27, 1935
- Died: April 5, 2002 (aged 66)
- Occupation: Local Politician

Lorna Jackson (October 25, 1935 – April 5, 2002) was a local politician in Vaughan, Ontario, Canada (adjacent to Toronto), for 28 years. During her career, she served as both a local and a regional councillor, as well as serving as the Mayor of Vaughan for 20 years. She died while in office in 2002.

== Political career ==
Jackson was first elected as a councillor in 1974. She served six years until she was elected as a regional councillor in 1980. In 1982, Jackson was elected as the Town of Vaughan's second mayor. Jackson led the city council and staff through much rapid growth, as well as the transition from a town into a city in 1991. She continued to be re-elected as mayor for a total of seven terms until her death in 2002.

In addition to her responsibilities as a member on the city council for Vaughan, Jackson also served on York Regional Council for 22 years. She was a member of its health, finance, planning and economic development committees. Additionally, Jackson was a member of the Toronto and Region Conservation Authority, a former chair of the York Regional Police Services Board, served on the Greater Toronto Services Board, and a member of the board of directors of Hydro Vaughan Distribution Inc.

== Campaigns and causes ==
Jackson successfully led the lobby to have the Ontario Minor Hockey Association make face protection for children mandatory in recreational hockey. She supported the construction of a pedestrian bridge over the Humber River. She also was instrumental in promoting the design of the Woodbridge Pool to make it easier for physically challenged residents to learn how to swim.

In 1988, she campaigned for an extension of the Toronto Transit Commission's Spadina Subway line north from Metropolitan Toronto into Vaughan to the then-future Highway 407 corridor.

In her final years as mayor, Jackson sought to adjust the boundaries of the southern municipalities of York Region so that Markham's half of the community of Thornhill would be annexed into the City of Vaughan.

As a result of a lawsuit filed against the City of Toronto government for the Keele Valley Landfill, Jackson lead city council to close the site by the end of 2002. Stating in 2000 that Vaughan was "no longer willing to host", the landfill was closed on January 1, 2003 and filled with four feet of clay and topsoil.

== Family ==
Jackson and her husband Al were married for 45 years. They had three children: Linda, Jim and Jeff, and five grandchildren: Carolyn, Lindsay, Lauren, John-Paul and Lucas. Her daughter, Linda Jackson, was formerly Ward 2 Councillor, Regional Councillor, and Mayor of Vaughan.

== Death ==
In November 2000, as she was being re-elected for her seventh term, Jackson was diagnosed with cancer. On April 5, 2002, she succumbed to her battle with cancer, twenty years after first being elected mayor of Vaughan. Then MPP Greg Sorbara described her death as a "power vacuum".

== Legacy ==
Lorna Jackson Public School and Lorna Jackson Transformer Station are named for the late mayor. Additionally, the new Vaughan City Hall, which opened in 2011, was dedicated in honour of Jackson's commitment to the city.

Jackson's 1988 campaign to extend the TTC subway into Vaughan was realized in December 2017 when a Line 1 extension was opened to Highway 7 (1 km and an extra station farther north than the future 407 corridor terminus she actually lobbied for) at Vaughan Metropolitan Centre, which was not yet conceived in 1988.
