= Linda Jackson (politician) =

Canadian politician

Linda D. Jackson

Deputy Mayor of Vaughan
- Incumbent
- Assumed office November 15, 2022
- Preceded by: Mario Ferri

Vaughan Local and Regional Councillor
- Incumbent
- Assumed office December 1, 2018
- Preceded by: Sunder Singh

3rd Mayor of Vaughan
- In office December 1, 2006 – December 1, 2010
- Preceded by: Michael Di Biase
- Succeeded by: Maurizio Bevilacqua

Vaughan City Councillor for Ward 2
- In office 2002–2003
- Preceded by: Gino Rosati
- Succeeded by: Tony Carella

Linda D. Jackson is a Canadian politician and former mayor of Vaughan, Ontario. Jackson was elected mayor on November 14, 2006. Jackson won the election by 90 votes, displacing incumbent Michael Di Biase. She was later defeated by Maurizio Bevilacqua in the 2010 Vaughan municipal election.

== Early life and career ==
Jackson grew up in Pine Grove, in what is today a neighbourhood in the Woodbridge district of Vaughan, and attended Woodbridge High School and Thornhill Secondary School. Her father and brothers were active in local hockey, and Jackson was a founding member of the Pine Wood Angels in the early 1970s, the first girls’ hockey team in Vaughan, and later coached boys’ hockey.

Jackson is the daughter of the late Lorna Jackson, also a former mayor of the city. Lorna Jackson was first elected to Vaughan Council in 1974. Lorna Jackson later became Vaughan's longest-serving mayor, holding the office from 1982 until her death in office in April 2002. According to Jackson's official bio, she often discussed municipal politics with her family. Jackson "credits her mother with teaching her the importance of public service and how to effect change in the community".

Before running for public office, Jackson worked in human resources and security management for corporations in the city of Vaughan.

Jackson has served on the Vaughan Health Care Foundation, volunteered with Big Brothers and Big Sisters of York Region, and is the past chair of the York Region Abuse Program. Jackson is an avid gardener.

== Political career ==
=== Councillor ===
Jackson was first elected to the position of ward councillor in 2002 in a by-election. Jackson was then elected as regional councillor in the 2003 municipal election, serving as York Region councillor from Vaughan from 2003 to 2006.

=== Mayor of Vaughan ===
In 2006, Jackson was elected the mayor of Vaughan by 90 votes. Jackson was elected on a platform to clean up City Hall after reports of irregularities under the former Mayor Di Biase. The subsequent controversy over her election campaign led to years of fighting with city council, lasting throughout the entirety of her term in office.

==== Conflict with Council ====
On December 15, 2008 all eight city councillors held a press conference to demand Jackson's resignation. Their request came after a lengthy public debate over Jackson's expenses. An audit by Ernst and Young released December 3 found she had not violated any rules. The report also found "there were no personal expenditures of the mayor that were claimed as business expenses."

Jackson rejected calls for her resignation and launched the "Working Together for Vaughan" campaign on January 11, 2009. She said the goal of her campaign was "to restore professionalism and accountability and transparency at City Hall." Jackson also presented Council with suggested reforms to the City Expenditure Policy.

==== Election expenses controversy ====
On June 18, 2008, an audit ordered by a provincial court judge of Jackson's 2006 campaign finances found that she had exceeded her legal spending limit of $120,419 by at least $12,356, or 10 per cent. The auditors, LECG Canada Ltd., said that amount could almost double if what they believed to be unreported contributions in kind at various election events – but couldn't prove – are later verified.

They also found other apparent contraventions of the elections act, including at least five instances where associated companies made donations that exceeded the normal $750 donation limit per company. On April 23, 2009, 68 charges were laid related to how much was spent on her 2006 campaign. Two days later, she sued Toronto radio host Dean Blundell for defamation after he reportedly called her a "fraudster" and a "fat pig" on the air. In March 2011, all chargers were dropped by a special prosecutor because Vaughan council hadn't acted on a compliance audit application within the 30 days required by the act.

It was also discovered that Jackson used taxpayer funds to have her Mayoral office swept for 'bugs', or surveillance devices, costing nearly $3,000 "Through a Freedom of Information request, residents Gino and Mary Ruffolo, former supporters turned Jackson critics, uncovered an invoice showing the mayor's office paid Protech Consult Services $2,730 for equipment and labour for "manual and electronic counter surveillance." Later that year, her husband was arrested and charged by police after a disturbance at a nightclub in Vaughan.

==== Election defeat ====
Maurizio Bevilacqua, resigned from his seat as a Liberal Member of Parliament for Vaughan, to run against Jackson in the 2010 election. Bevilacqua easily defeated Jackson in the election, receiving over 63% of the vote to Jackson's 14.3%.

Return to Politics

On October 22, 2018 Linda Jackson was elected back to Vaughan Council by winning a seat as a Local and Regional Councillor.

On October 24, 2022 she was elected as Deputy Mayor and re-elected as a Local and Regional Councillor.

== Personal life ==
Jackson is married to Mario Campese, with a blended family of three adult daughters, a son and a grandson. Linda and her family live in the Vaughan community of Vellore Village.
