= Mario Ferri =

Italian-Canadian community organizer, politician and activist

Mario Felice Ferri
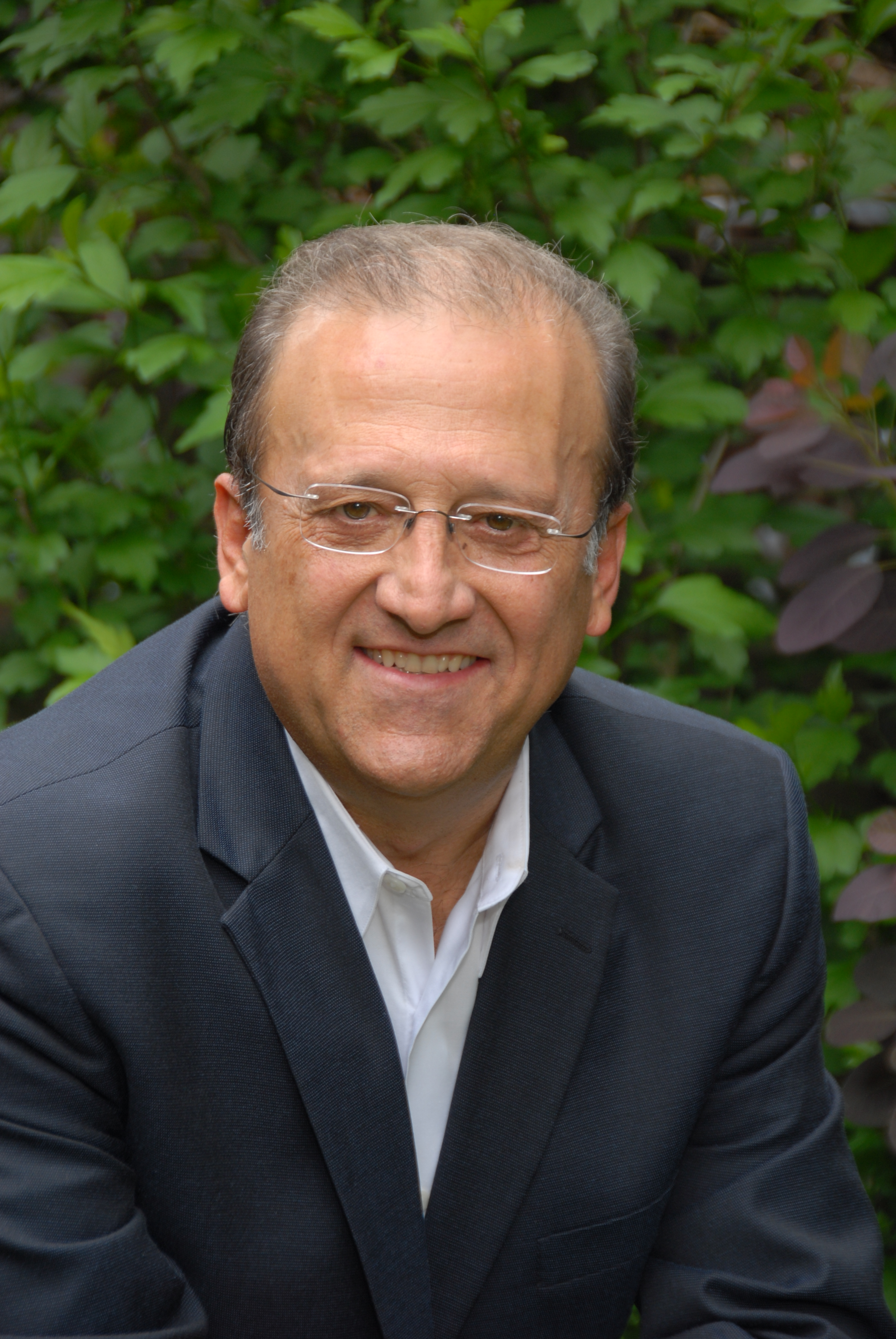
- Ferri in 2010

Regional Councillor of Vaughan, Ontario, Canada
- Incumbent
- Assumed office December 1, 2014
- In office 1997–2010

Deputy Mayor
- In office May 18, 2017 – November 15, 2022
- Preceded by: Michael Di Biase
- Succeeded by: Linda Jackson

Personal details
- Born: January 6, 1948 (age 78) Pescosolido, Frosinone, Italy
- Occupation: Municipal Councillor; Regional Councillor; Deputy Mayor; City of Vaughan

Mario Felice Ferri (Italian pronunciation: [ˈmaːrjo ˈfɛrri]; born January 6, 1948) is an Italian-Canadian community organizer, activist, municipal and regional councillor of Vaughan, Ontario. He also co-founded an organization credited with helping to force the closure of Canada's largest municipal waste facility, the Keele Valley Landfill.

At the time of its closure, the waste facility was the third-largest in North America near the heart of Vaughan, the fifth-largest city in the Greater Toronto Area. The waste landfill site became the centre of a 14-year battle between the citizens of Vaughan and both the Government of Ontario and the City of Toronto government, which owned and operated the site. Mr. Ferri co-founded Vaughan CARES, an activist group that became prominent in the fight to close the waste facility.

As a community organizer Ferri also contributed to numerous cultural organizations and helped organize large events, as well as administering community recreational facilities in Toronto, Vaughan and other surrounding communities. In his roles as a York Region Separate School Board trustee, municipal and regional councillor and deputy mayor he undertook several community campaigns and frequently acted as a spokesperson for the school board, the City of Vaughan and for York Region. In October 2014, Ferri was elected to his fifth term as a councillor for the City of Vaughan and his third term as a councillor for the Region of York, Ontario.

== Biography ==
Ferri was born in Pescosolido, Frosinone, Italy on January 6, 1948, to Fillipo and Maria Ferri, immigrating to Canada by ship docking at the Pier 21 in Halifax, Nova Scotia, in 1959, soon after settling in Toronto. Ferri attended Neil McNeil High School and then entered Centennial College, graduating with a diploma in Recreation Leadership in 1970. He then attended and graduated from York University with a Bachelor of Arts Degree in psychology and sociology in 1978, and a Masters of Environmental Studies mastering in Human Service Management from the same university in 1983. Ferri married Vickie Lamanna in 1972 and moved to Vaughan in 1984 where he continues to live, and where he and his wife raised a family of three children.

== Early career ==
Ferri became the leader of the human services management advisory committee for both Centennial College and George Brown College in Toronto. He has also served as a consultant to numerous recreation facilities spanning at least 17 years. He worked as a director of the East Scarborough Boys & Girls Club in Scarborough, Ontario, from 1973 until 1977, then becoming the executive director of the West Scarborough Boys & Girls Club the same year. In the early 1980s Ferri helped transform the youth centre into a community centre to provide additional services for seniors.

== Keele Valley Landfill activism ==
Ferri's was a co-founder and a leader of the activist community organization Vaughan Committee of Associations to Restore Environmental Safety (Vaughan CARES). CARES successfully challenged the Government of Ontario’s intention to extend the life of the Keele Valley Landfill in the centre of Vaughan, and Ferri helping accomplish the shutdown. The group he co-founded in 1988, had approximately 300 members at the time of its incorporation in 1989, and 15 directors in 1990, stating it represented all the city's ratepayers' associations that covered Vaughan's 100,000 residents. By 1995 its membership had risen to at least 3,000 and had already spent an estimated CAN$600,000, a cost figure that was to mushroom. The anti-dump lobby group helped close the landfill by rallying the city’s citizens over a 14-year period. Ferri served in various capacities as its vice-president, president, and in its chairmanship.

Keele Valley, at the time the third largest waste landfill in North America, was originally set to close in January 1989, a date that was extended at least four times by the provincial government without an environmental impact assessment, generating considerable anger among Vaughan's citizens, as they had endured years of ill effects. Ferri proposed, first as a community lobbyist in 1988, that the landfill’s life should not be extended beyond its planned closure in 1993, and responded unambiguously when the province later proposed a lengthy extension well into the 21st century. During his work with CARES he led numerous demonstrations and confronted both civic and provincial officials who sought to expand and continue the dump's operating life past its scheduled closure. Continuous pressure by CARES and the City of Vaughan, including court challenges, threats of civil disobedience, and large protests, finally swayed the provincial government away from a further extension of Keele Valley’s operating permit, and the site was closed on the very last day of 2002.

== Community and public service ==
Ferri helped obtain financing for and founded a number of recreational facilities for tennis and bocce, plus youth and senior’s clubs across southern Ontario. He assisted in organizing community forums, surveys and public festivals. Ferri ran for and won a seat as trustee on the York Region Separate School Board in 1990, running against a slate of 30 candidates in the Board’s Area 1 district. He again ran for the trustee’s seat in 1991, and also lobbied against the diversion of school construction funding to other municipalities. Ferri was selected to lead the delegation from Vaughan to formally sign the Friendship and Twin City agreements with the Italian city of Sora in the Provence of Frosinone (Lazio) in 1992

First elected to Vaughan City council as Ward 1 Councillor in the 1997 municipal election, Ferri secured 87% of the popular vote, and was re-elected in 2000 with 90% of the votes. He was then elected to York Regional Council in 2003, receiving the most votes among all regional councillors, thereby becoming Deputy Mayor (earlier called Acting Mayor) of Vaughan. He was reelected to his regional council seat in 2006, but was unsuccessful in his bid for reelection in the 2010 municipal election. Ferri dealt with a wide variety of issues while on council, and as deputy major (2003–2006), often being quoted in local media, as well as on Toronto-based national news outlets. He was noticed in 1999 for being one of two councillors to opt out of retroactive salary increases that council had implemented. He's also drawn criticisms, such as for a perceived conflict of interest related to the use of a community centre building where he met with constituents to consult on community issues and his nomination to regional council, as well as his participation in a Santafest parade float on the eve of an election.

Ferri stood for, but was unsuccessful in his bid to become the Member of Parliament in support of the Liberal Party representing Vaughan Riding in Canada’s 2011 federal election. He ran against the Conservative incumbent and future cabinet minister Julian Fantino. Despite having entered the federal election campaign late Ferri scored a second place result with over 20,000 votes, garnering 30% of the riding's popular vote among several candidates.

In 2014 Ferri announced his candidacy to return to his former position as a local and regional councillor in York and Vaughan's October 2014 municipal election. He succeeded and was elected, earning 27,647 votes and placing second among the three openings, but fell approximately 1,650 votes shy of also returning to his former position as deputy mayor.

== Recognition and awards ==
Ferri has been recognized for founding sports facilities plus youth and seniors clubs, for which he received a Silver Keystone, Queen Elizabeth II Golden Jubilee, and 125th Anniversary of the Confederation of Canada awards. In 1989 he was presented with a Government of Ontario’s Corps d’Elite Award, one of five given that year, for outstanding contributions to recreation throughout Southern Ontario. The Corps d’Elite was presented to him by Ontario M.P.P. Greg Sorbara, who spoke of Ferri’s work being instrumental in the development of recreation programs and facilities in both Maple, Ontario, and across Southern Ontario.

== See also ==
- Vaughan City Council
- York Regional Council
