= Michael Di Biase =

Canadian politician

2nd Mayor of Vaughan
- In office April 5, 2002 – December 1, 2006
- Preceded by: Lorna Jackson
- Succeeded by: Linda Jackson

Vaughan Regional Councillor Deputy Mayor
- In office 1989–2002
- Preceded by: Nick A. Di Giovanni
- Succeeded by: Joyce Frustaglio
- In office 2014–2017
- Preceded by: Gino Rosati
- Succeeded by: Mario Ferri

Michael Di Biase (born 1947) is a Canadian politician who formerly part of the regional council of the city of Vaughan, Ontario as the deputy mayor and mayor. He was first elected to the city's council in 1986. Following the death of Mayor Lorna Jackson in 2002, Di Biase was appointed acting mayor by virtue of his position as senior regional councillor (a position he had held since 1988). In the 2003 municipal election, Di Biase won his first official term as mayor.

He became the first chairman of the Vaughan Health Care Foundation, an independent non-profit organization established by the city of Vaughan on 16 January 2004 to "bring a hospital and ancillary services" to the city.

The Globe and Mail newspaper reports that Di Biase received an annual salary of $164,074, making him one of the highest-paid municipal politicians in the country. The next highest paid mayor was Hazel McCallion of Mississauga at $158,704. The mayor of the largest city in Canada, David Miller of Toronto, received $143,635 per year. The average salary of Vaughan councillors was $102,657 which is second to that of Mississauga at $113,296, while Toronto councillors earn $85,497.

In the 2006 municipal election, Di Biase faced Lorna Jackson's daughter Linda Jackson and lost by 90 votes in one of the closest races of the night. After a court-ordered recount completed on April 26, 2007, which had been initiated by Di Biase, it was confirmed that Jackson had indeed won the election.

In 2006, Di Biase was made a Knight Officer of the Order of Merit by the Government of Italy.

In September 2009, after an audit of Di Biase's campaign in Vaughan's 2006 municipal election, he had faced 27 charges in contravention of the Municipal Elections Act, including alleged election finance irregularities.

He was elected Local and Regional Councillor for the City of Vaughan in October 2010. His term began December 1, 2010.

In July 2011, an auditing committee voted to examine expenses relating to Di Biase's 2010 campaign. It is alleged that due to improper reporting and accounting procedures on DiBiase's part, he improperly kept $32,000 in campaign funds that should have been returned to the city.

In April 2015, Di Biase was docked three month's pay for breaching the city's code of conduct by aiding a local construction firm acquire municipal contracts.

On May 18, 2017 Di Biase resigned as regional councillor and deputy mayor stemming from sexual assault and sexual harassment allegations made by a city staffer.

In October 2019, Di Biase was charged with one charge each of breach of trust and municipal corruption under the criminal code. In February 2020, the two criminal code charges were dropped, but Di Biase pleaded guilty and was convicted of an offence under the Municipal Act. He was charged $5,000 and donated $20,000 to two Vaughan charities as part of the agreement. At that time, Di Biase had recently suffered a heart attack, had Type 2 diabetes, as well as kidney issues.
