= Ottawa =

Capital city of Canada

- City and federal capital
- City of Ottawa; Ville d'Ottawa (French)
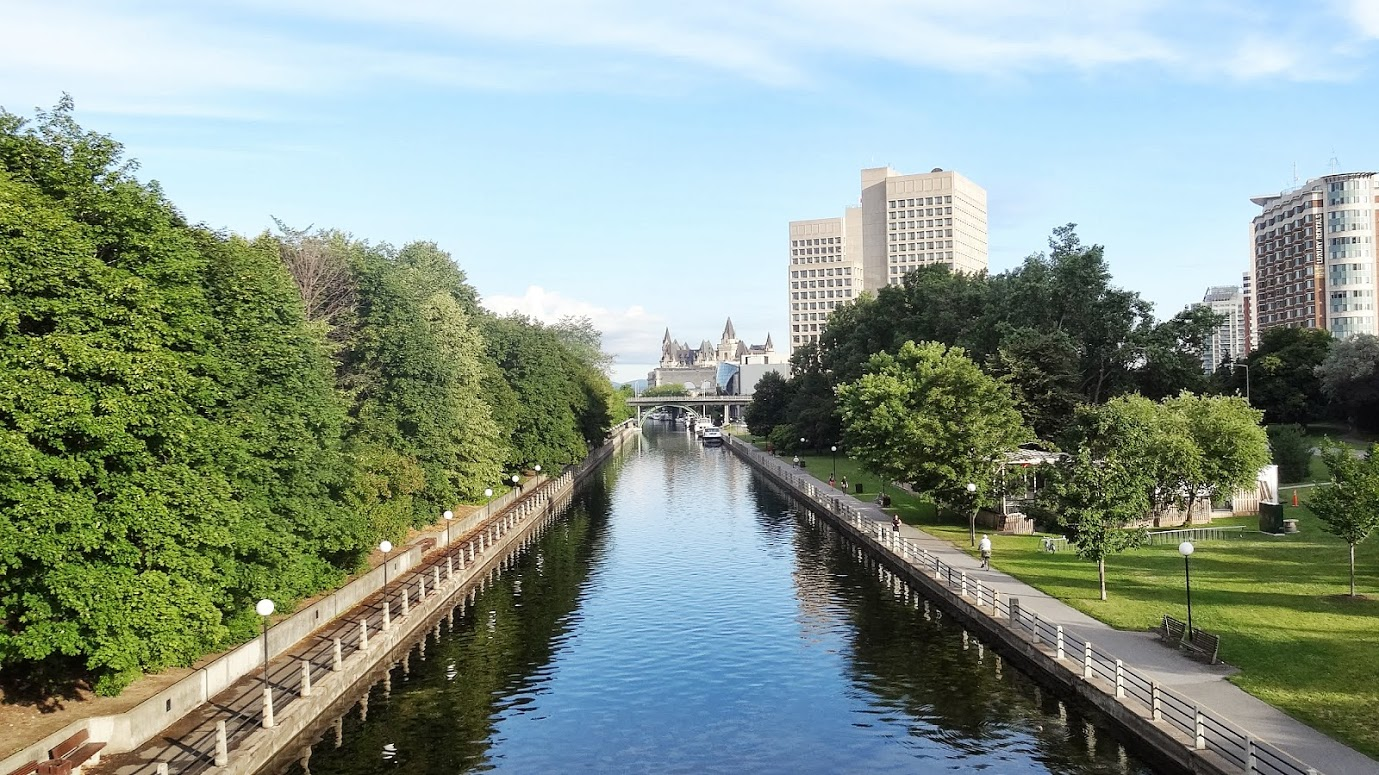
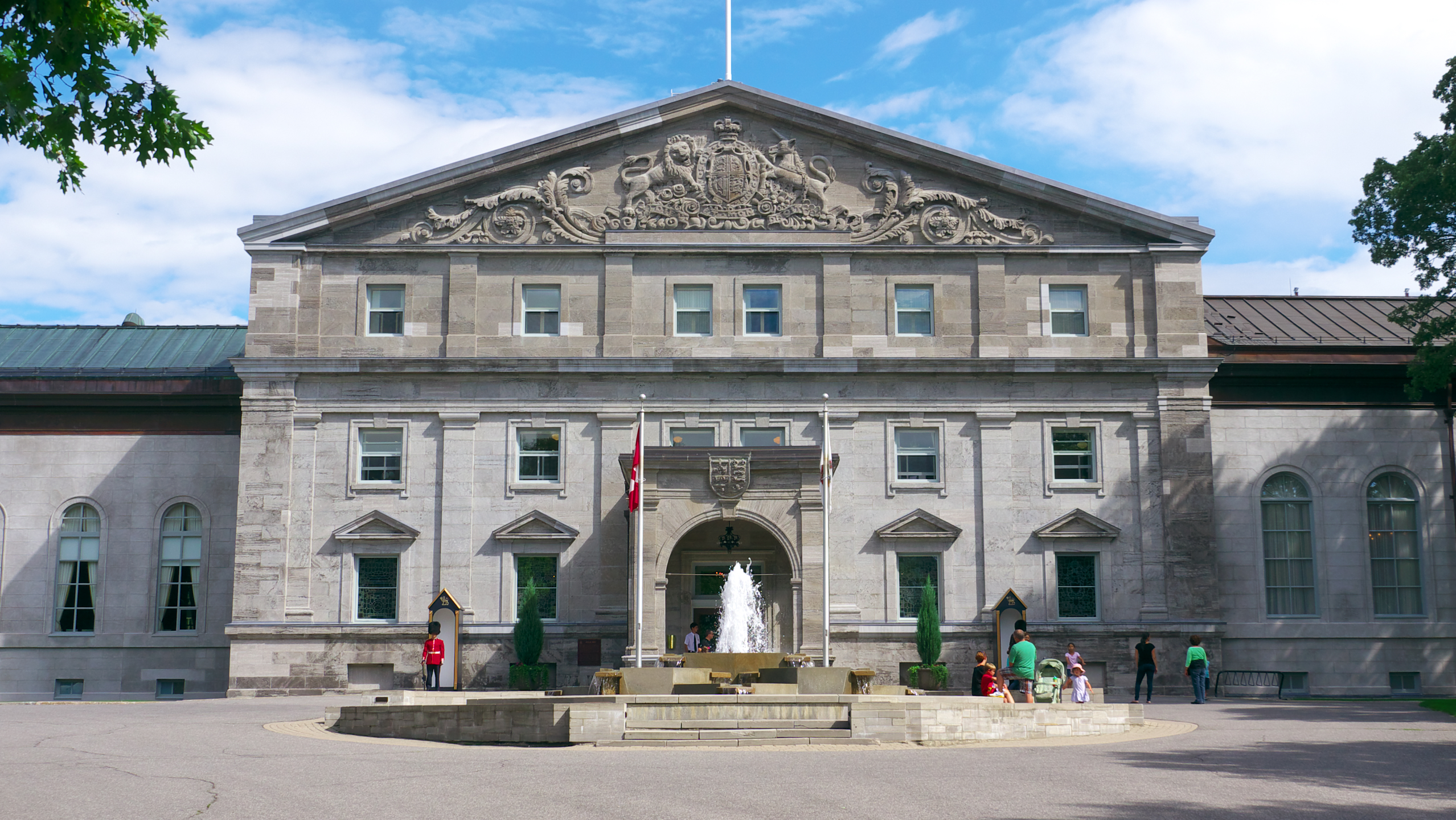
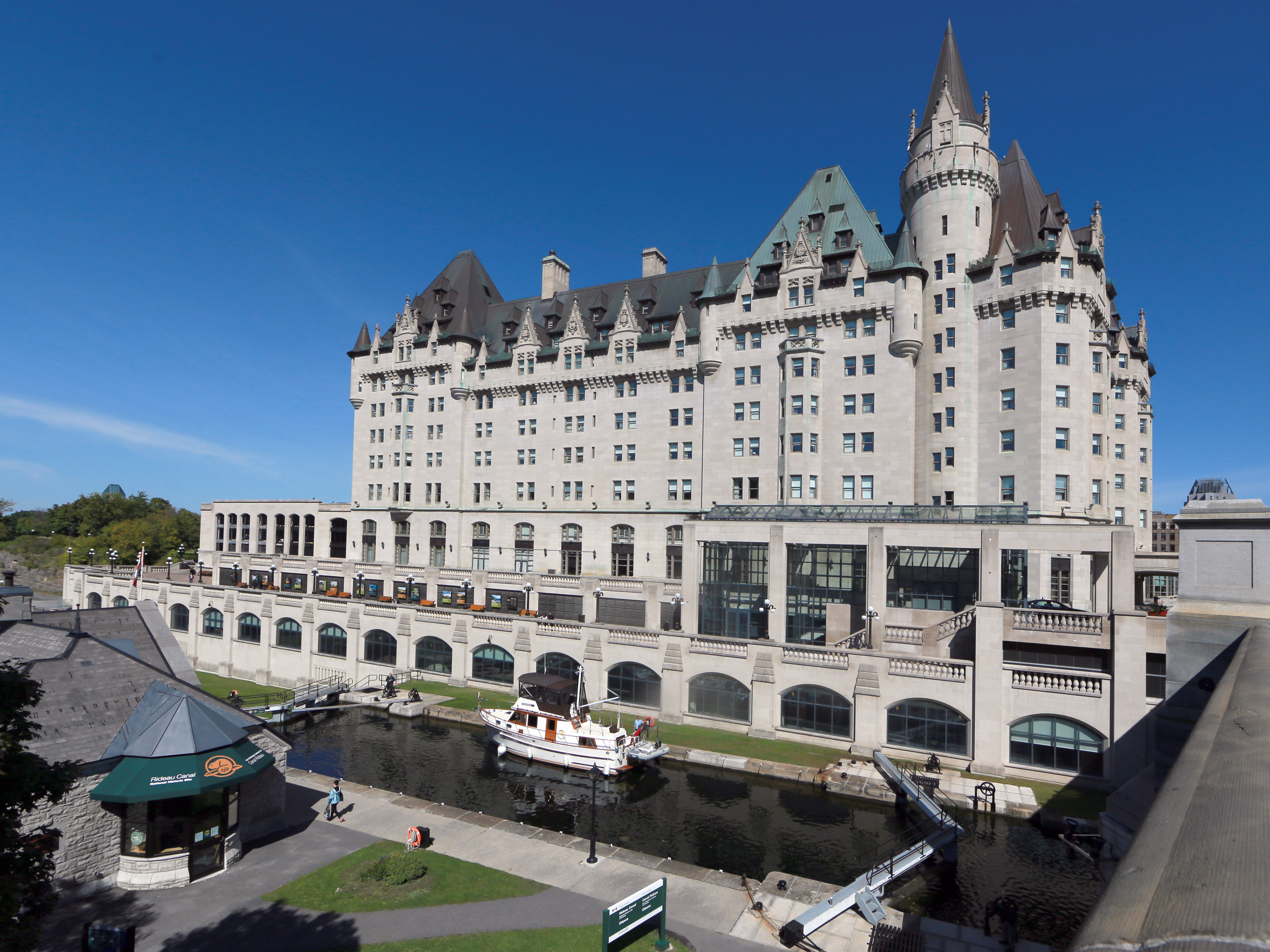
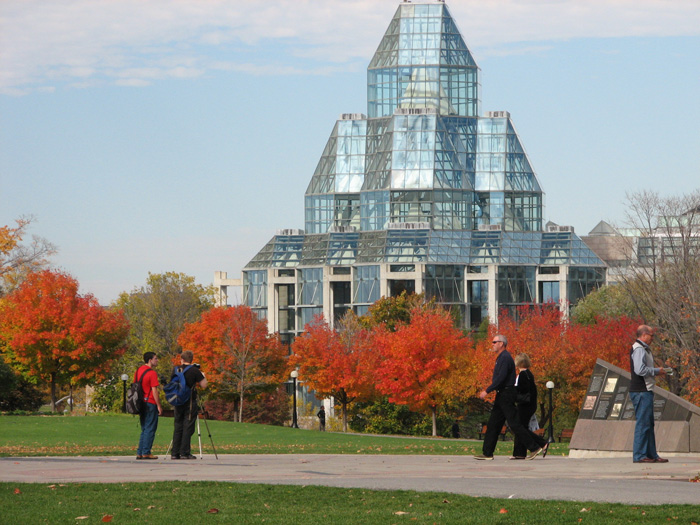
- Centre Block on Parliament Hill Rideau Canal Rideau Hall Château Laurier National Gallery of Canada

- Flag Coat of arms Logo
- Nickname: "O-town"
- Motto: "Advance-Ottawa-En Avant"; Written in the two official languages.
- Interactive map of Ottawa
- Location within Ontario Location within Canada Location within North America
- Coordinates: 45°25′29″N 75°41′42″W
- Country: Canada
- Province: Ontario
- Established: 1826 as Bytown
- Incorporated as town (Bytown): 1 January 1850
- Incorporated: 1855 as City of Ottawa
- Metropolitan Amalgamation: 1 January 2001

Government
  - Type: Single-tier municipality with a Mayor–council system
  - Mayor: Mark Sutcliffe
  - City council: Ottawa City Council
  - Federal representation: List of MPs: Mark Carney (LPC); Bruce Fanjoy (LPC); Mona Fortier (LPC); Marie-France Lalonde (LPC); David McGuinty (LPC); Yasir Naqvi (LPC); Jenna Sudds (LPC); Anita Vandenbeld (LPC)
  - Provincial representation: List of MPPs: Stephen Blais (OLP); Lucille Collard (OLP); George Darouze (PC); John Fraser (OLP); Karen McCrimmon (OLP); Catherine McKenney (NDP); Chandra Pasma (NDP); Tyler Watt (OLP)

Area
  - City and federal capital: 2,790.31 km^{2} (1,077.34 sq mi)
  - Land: 2,788.20 km^{2} (1,076.53 sq mi)
  - Urban: 549.49 km^{2} (212.16 sq mi)
  - Metro: 8,046.99 km^{2} (3,106.96 sq mi)

Population (2021)
  - City and federal capital: 1,017,449 (4th)
  - Density: 364.9/km^{2} (945/sq mi)
  - Urban: 1,068,821
  - Urban density: 1,945.1/km^{2} (5,038/sq mi)
  - Metro: 1,488,307 (4th)
  - Metro density: 185/km^{2} (480/sq mi)
  - Demonym: Ottawan

GDP (Nominal, 2022)
  - Metro: CA$106 billion (US$84.8 billion)
  - Per capita: CA$85,596 (US$68,476.8)
- Time zone: UTC−05:00 (EST)
  - Summer (DST): UTC−04:00 (EDT)
- Area codes: 613, 343, 753
- Website: ottawa.ca

Ottawa (/ˈɒtəwə/, /ˈɒtəwɑː/; Canadian French: [ɔtawɑ]) is the capital city of Canada. It is located in the southeastern portion of the province of Ontario, at the confluence of the Ottawa River and the Rideau River. Ottawa borders Gatineau, Quebec, and forms the core of the Ottawa–Gatineau census metropolitan area (CMA) and the National Capital Region (NCR). As of 2021, Ottawa had a city population of 1,017,449 and a metropolitan population of 1,488,307, making it the second-largest city and second most-populous metropolitan area in Ontario, and the fourth-largest city and fourth-largest metropolitan area in Canada.

Ottawa is the political centre of Canada and the headquarters of the federal government. The city houses numerous foreign embassies, key buildings, organizations, and institutions of Canada's government; these include the Parliament of Canada, the Supreme Court, the residence of Canada's viceroy, and the Office of the Prime Minister.

Founded in 1826 as "Bytown", incorporated in 1850, and renamed "Ottawa" in 1855, its original boundaries were expanded through numerous annexations and were ultimately replaced by a new city incorporation and amalgamation in 2001. The municipal government of Ottawa is established and governed by the City of Ottawa Act of the Government of Ontario. It has an elected city council across 24 wards and a mayor elected city-wide, each elected using the first-past-the-post voting election system.

Ottawa has the highest proportion of university-educated residents among Canadian cities and is home to several colleges, universities, and research and cultural institutions, including the University of Ottawa, Carleton University, Algonquin College, Collège La Cité, the National Arts Centre, and the National Gallery of Canada, as well as numerous national museums, monuments, and historic sites. It has a high standard of living and is one of the most visited cities in Canada, with over 11 million visitors annually.

== Etymology ==
The city name "Ottawa" was chosen in 1855 in reference to the Ottawa River, whose name is itself derived from the Algonquin adawe, meaning "to trade". In modern Algonquin, the city is known as Odàwàg.

== History ==
=== Early history ===
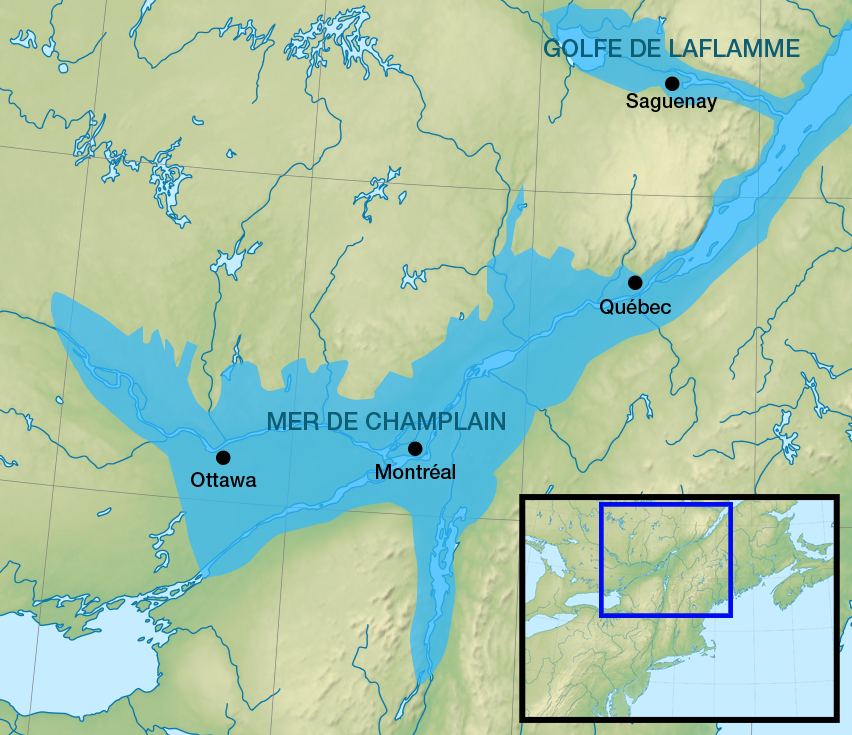
The Champlain Sea

The Ottawa Valley became habitable around 10,000 years ago following the natural draining of the Champlain Sea. The first evidence of human presence in the Ottawa Valley are spearpoints dated 8000-8500 years before present. By 6000 years before present, there were robust trading and communications networks. Approximately 3000-3500 years before present, there is definitive evidence of continuously existing settlements, including likely hearths and heavy tools. In closer proximity to the modern bounds of the City of Ottawa, there has been documentation of specific settlements at the mouth of the Gatineau River dating back to 3000-3500 years prior to post-Columbian contact. These findings suggest that these Algonquin people were engaged in foraging, hunting and fishing, but also trade and travel. Three major rivers meet within Ottawa, making it an important trade and travel area for thousands of years. This period ended with the arrival of settlers and colonization of North America by Europeans during and after the 15th century.

=== European exploration and early development ===
In 1610, Étienne Brûlé became the first documented European to navigate the Ottawa River, passing what would become Ottawa on his way to the Great Lakes. Three years later, Samuel de Champlain wrote about the waterfalls in the area and about his encounters with the Algonquin people.

The first non-Indigenous settlement in the area was created by Philemon Wright, a New Englander. Wright founded a lumber town in the area on 7 March 1800 on the north side of the river, across from the present-day city of Ottawa in Hull. He, with five other families and twenty-five labourers, also created an agricultural community called Wright's Town, which would later become Gatineau. Wright pioneered the Ottawa Valley timber trade (soon to be the area's most significant economic activity) by transporting timber by river from the Ottawa Valley to Quebec City.

In the 1820s, news of the British military's impending construction of the Rideau Canal led to land speculation by John Le Breton, a local businessman who bought a land lot on the prediction of the upcoming construction, which led to an alternative canal course being selected. A town was established in 1826 and in 1827 was named after the British military engineer Colonel John By, who was responsible for the Rideau Waterway construction project. The Rideau Canal provided a secure route between Montreal and Kingston on Lake Ontario. It bypassed a vulnerable stretch of the St. Lawrence River bordering the state of New York that had left re-supply ships bound for southwestern Ontario easily exposed to enemy fire during the War of 1812.

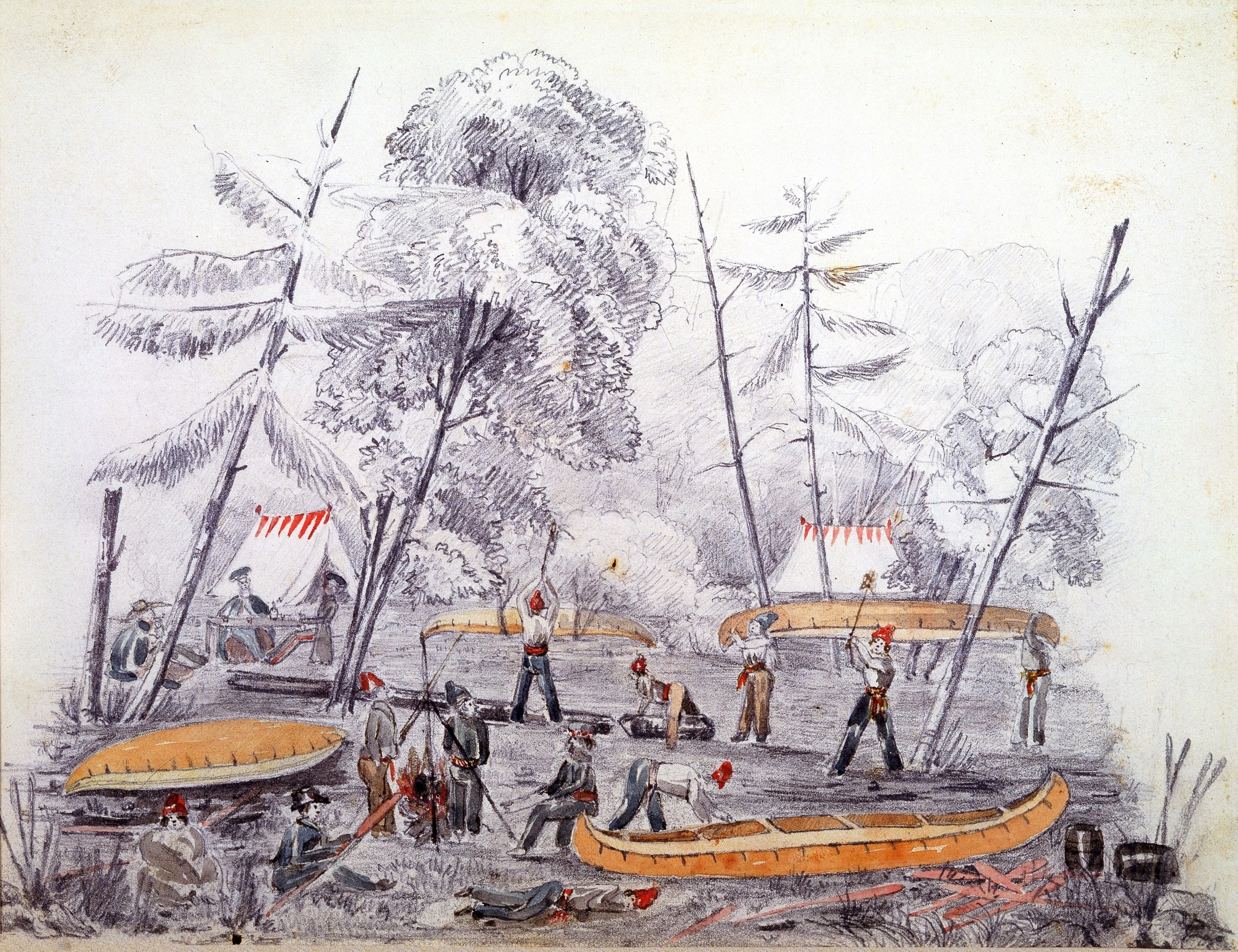
Camp used by soldiers and labourers of the Rideau Canal, on the south side of the Ottawa River in 1826. The building of the canal attracted many land speculators to the area.

Colonel By set up military barracks on the site of today's Parliament Hill. He also laid out the streets of the town and created two distinct neighbourhoods named "Upper Town" west of the canal and "Lower Town" east of the canal. Similar to its Upper Canada and Lower Canada namesakes, historically, "Upper Town" was predominantly English-speaking and Protestant, whereas "Lower Town" was mostly French, Irish and Catholic. Bytown's early pioneer period saw Irish labourers cause unrest during the Shiners' War from 1835 to 1845, coming into conflict with French settlers.

Bytown's population grew to 1,000 as the Rideau Canal was completed in 1832. The settlement was incorporated as a town in 1850. In 1855, Bytown was renamed Ottawa and obtained city status. William Pittman Lett was installed as the first city clerk, serving from 1844 to 1891, guiding Ottawa through 36 years of development, leading the hiring of key municipal roles, founding civic organizations, and proposing a set of by-laws for the city.

Starting in the 1850s, entrepreneurs known as lumber barons began to build large sawmills, which produced tens of millions of board feet of timber, such as producing 39 million in 1855 after the USA began accepting imports, against approximately 480 million board feet imported from across Canada in Britain a decade earlier, and eventually rising to 613 million in the early 20th century. Rail lines built in 1854 connected Ottawa to areas south and, from 1886, to the transcontinental rail network via Hull and Lachute, Quebec. By 1885 Ottawa was the only city in Canada whose downtown street-lights were powered entirely by electricity.

=== Selection as capital ===
The selection of Ottawa as a capital city predates the Confederation of Canada. The choice was contentious, with the Parliament of the United Province of Canada holding more than 200 votes over several decades to attempt to settle on a legislative solution to the location of its capital. Political dissension between the Reformist and Tory wings of the political establishment led to the Stony Monday Riot of 1849. During these riots, the Tories violently disrupted a Reformist reception for the Governor General to promote Bytown as capital of the province.

The governor-general of the Province of Canada designated Kingston as the capital in 1841. This was controversial: the cities of Toronto and Montreal, as well as the former capital of Lower Canada, Quebec City, all had legislators dissatisfied with Kingston as the capital, although anglophone merchants in Quebec were the leading group supportive of the Kingston arrangement. In 1842, a vote rejected Kingston as the capital, and study of potential candidates included Bytown, but that option proved less popular than Toronto or Montreal. In 1843, a report by the Executive Council recommended Montreal as the capital, as it was a more fortifiable location and commercial centre. However, the governor-general refused to execute a move without a parliamentary vote. In 1844, the Queen's acceptance of a parliamentary vote moved the capital to Montreal.

In 1849, after an Orange mob burned the Parliament building in Montreal, several votes were held on a new permanent capital. Kingston and Bytown were again considered. However, the winning proposal was for the legislature to alternate sitting in either Quebec City and Toronto, in a policy known as perambulation. Logistical difficulties made this an unpopular arrangement, and an 1856 vote passed for the lower house of parliament to relocate permanently to Quebec City. The move did not proceed, as the upper house refused to approve funding for the relocation.

The funding impasse led to the ending of the legislature's role in determining the seat of government. The legislature requested the Queen determine the seat of government. The Queen then acted on the advice of her governor general Edmund Head, who, after reviewing proposals from various cities, selected the recently renamed Ottawa. The Queen sent a letter to colonial authorities selecting Ottawa as the capital, effective 31 December 1857. George Brown, briefly a co-premier of the Province of Canada, attempted to reverse this decision but was unsuccessful. The Parliament ratified the Queen's choice in 1859, with Quebec serving as interim capital from 1859 to 1865. The relocation process began in 1865, with the first session of Parliament held in the new buildings in 1866. The buildings were generally well received by legislators.

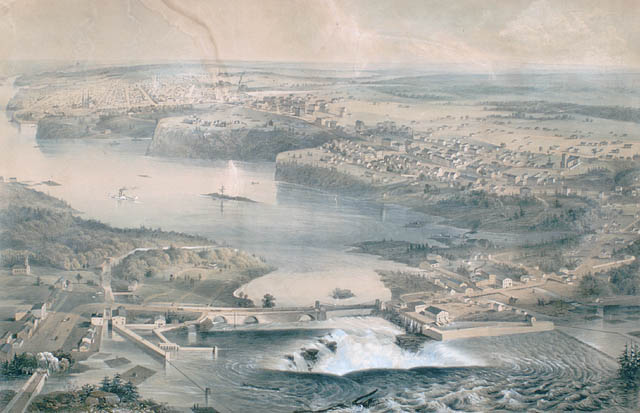
Ottawa in 1859, before construction on Parliament Hill. Two years prior, Queen Victoria selected the city as the permanent capital of the Province of Canada.

Ottawa was recommended by Head as the capital due to palatability with both Upper and Lower Canada. Other considerations also favoured Ottawa. Ottawa's isolated location, surrounded by dense forest far from the Canada–US border and situated on a cliff face, would make it more defensible from attack. Despite the city's regional isolation, there was water transportation access from spring to fall, both to Montreal via the Ottawa River and to Kingston via the Rideau Waterway. Additionally, by 1854 it also had a modern all-season railway (the Bytown and Prescott Railway) that carried passengers, lumber and supplies 82 kilometres (51 miles) to Prescott on the Saint Lawrence River and beyond. Ottawa's small size was also thought to make it less prone to politically motivated mob violence, as had happened in the previous Canadian capitals. Finally, the government already owned the land that eventually became Parliament Hill, which it thought would be an ideal location for the Parliament buildings.

The original Parliament buildings, which included the Centre, East and West Blocks, were constructed between 1859 and 1866 in the Gothic Revival style. Public Works Canada and its architects were not initially well prepared for the relatively shallow-lying bedrock involved in construction and as a result had to redesign architectural drawings, leading to delays. The Library of Parliament and Parliament Hill landscaping were completed in 1876.

=== Post-Confederation and early 20th century ===
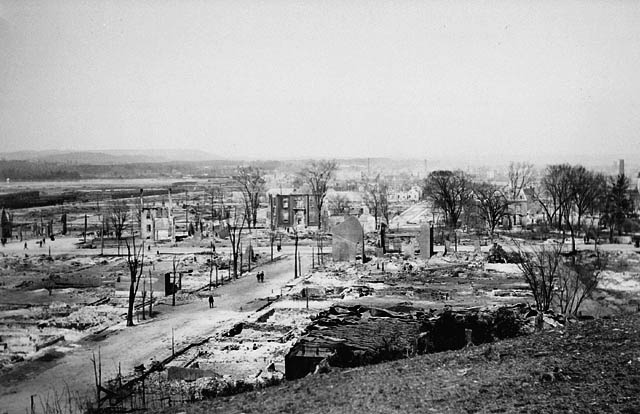
LeBreton Flats after the 1900 Hull–Ottawa fire. The fire destroyed one-fifth of Ottawa and two-thirds of neighbouring Hull, Quebec.

In 1868, the only assassination of a federal Canadian politician happened in downtown Ottawa, on Sparks Street when Thomas D'Arcy McGee was shot, and suspected Fenian Patrick James Whelan was later convicted and publicly hanged.

In 1874, Métis political leader Louis Riel attempted to take his seat in parliament in Ottawa despite there being an active warrant for his arrest.

In 1889, the government distributed 60 "water leases" to local industrialists, which gave them permission to generate electricity and use hydroelectric generators at Chaudière Falls. Public transportation began in 1870 with a horsecar system, overtaken in the 1890s by an electric streetcar system that operated until 1959 and peaked at trackage of 90.5km, including an extension to Hull.

In 1900, a chimney fire spread throughout Hull, destroying two-thirds of the city, including the facilities of major lumber employers and main street buildings. Due to high winds, the fire spread quickly through the wooden buildings that were widespread at the time. It eventually spread to Ottawa, where it destroyed about one-fifth of the buildings from the Lebreton Flats south to Booth Street and down to Dow's Lake. The fire destroyed approximately 3,200 buildings and caused an estimated $300 million in damage (in 2020 Canadian dollars). An estimated 14% of Ottawans and 40% of Hull residents were left homeless. The fire had a disproportionate effect on west-end lower-income neighbourhoods. It had also spread among many lumber yards, a major part of Ottawa's economy.

In 1911, the municipality saw over 80 deaths related to a worse-than-average outbreak of typhoid, caused by sewage disposal affecting the city's drinking water intake from Nepean Bay. Immediate measures taken were insufficient to prevent 1,400 further typhoid cases in 1912, leading to 98 deaths and unsuccessful calls for temporary relocation of the capital to Toronto until the issue was resolved.

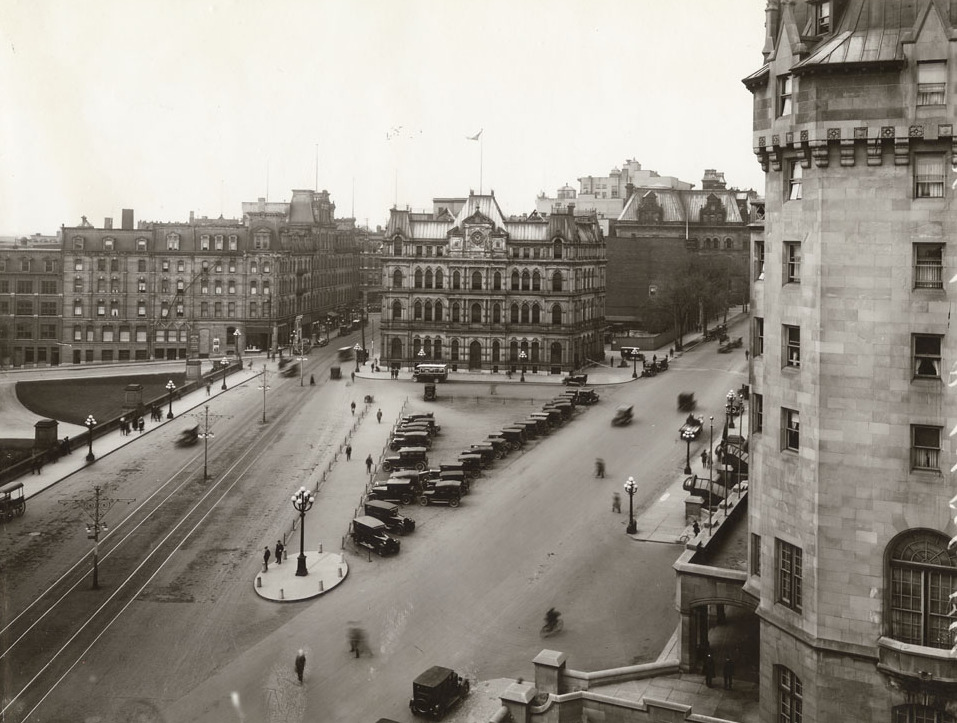
Ottawa Post Office, located in Confederation Square, pictured in the early 20th century

On 1 June 1912, the Grand Trunk Railway opened both the Château Laurier hotel and its neighbouring downtown Union Station. On 3 February 1916, the Centre Block of the Parliament buildings was destroyed by a fire. The House of Commons and Senate were temporarily relocated to the recently constructed Victoria Memorial Museum (now the Canadian Museum of Nature) until the completion of the new Centre Block in 1927. The centrepiece of the new Parliament buildings is a dominant Gothic Revival-styled structure known as the Peace Tower.

The location of what is now Confederation Square was a former commercial district centrally located in a triangular downtown area surrounded by historically significant heritage buildings, including the Parliament buildings. It was redeveloped as a ceremonial centre in 1938 as part of the City Beautiful Movement. It became the site of the National War Memorial in 1939 and was designated a National Historic Site in 1984. A new Central Post Office (now the Privy Council of Canada) was constructed in 1939 beside the War Memorial because the original post office building on the proposed Confederation Square grounds had to be demolished.

During the Second World War, the City of Ottawa increased temporary housing in the city for men in the military and their families, with the pavilion at Lansdowne Park being transformed into a barracks, as it had been during the First World War. The Second World War also coincided with expansion and centralization in federal government operations, with the size of the federal public service roughly tripling from 12,000 to 36,000. This expansion was reflected in the erection of new buildings, both temporary and permanent, to accommodate the new workers.

Short film by Canadian Government 1938

=== Post–Second World War ===
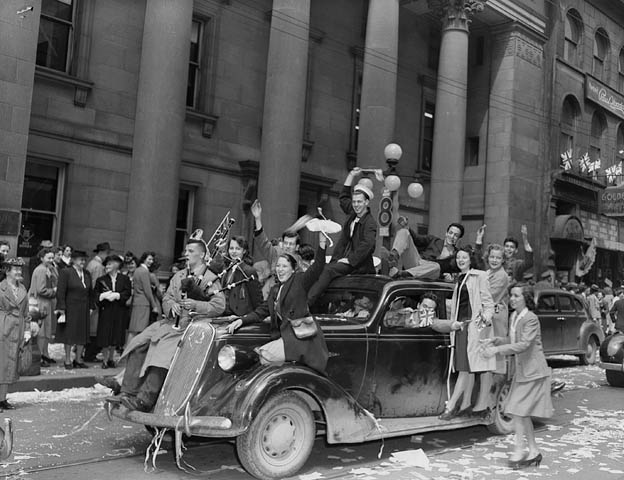
V-Day, downtown Ottawa in 1945, to mark the end of World War II

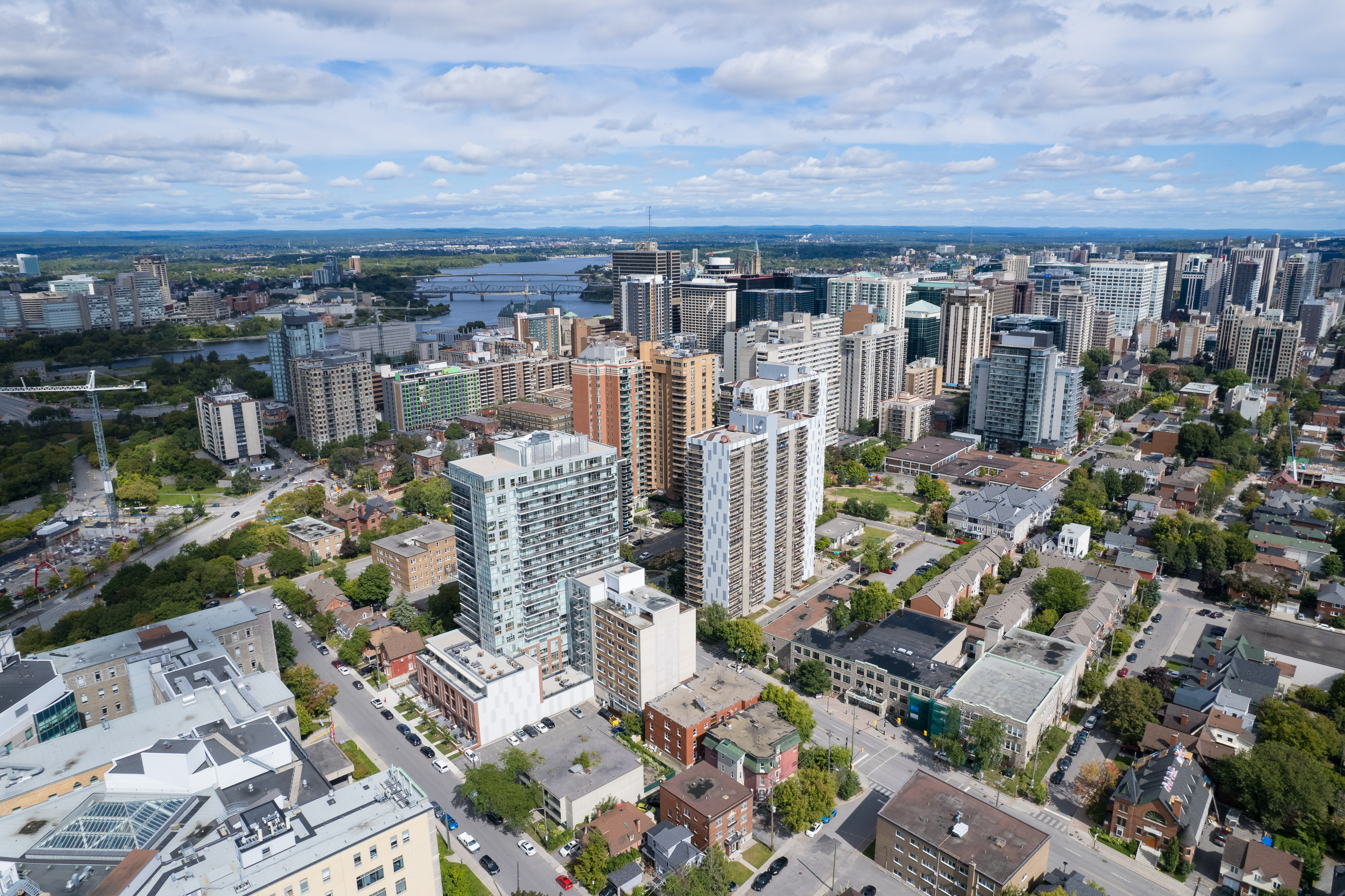
Downtown Ottawa is situated on the south bank of the Ottawa River with neighbouring Gatineau in the background across the river.

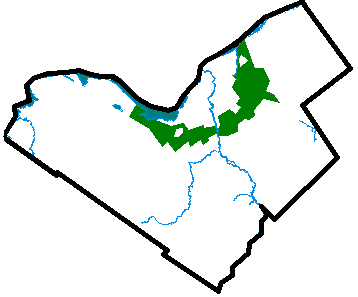
Gréber plan's National Capital Greenbelt surrounding the urban core

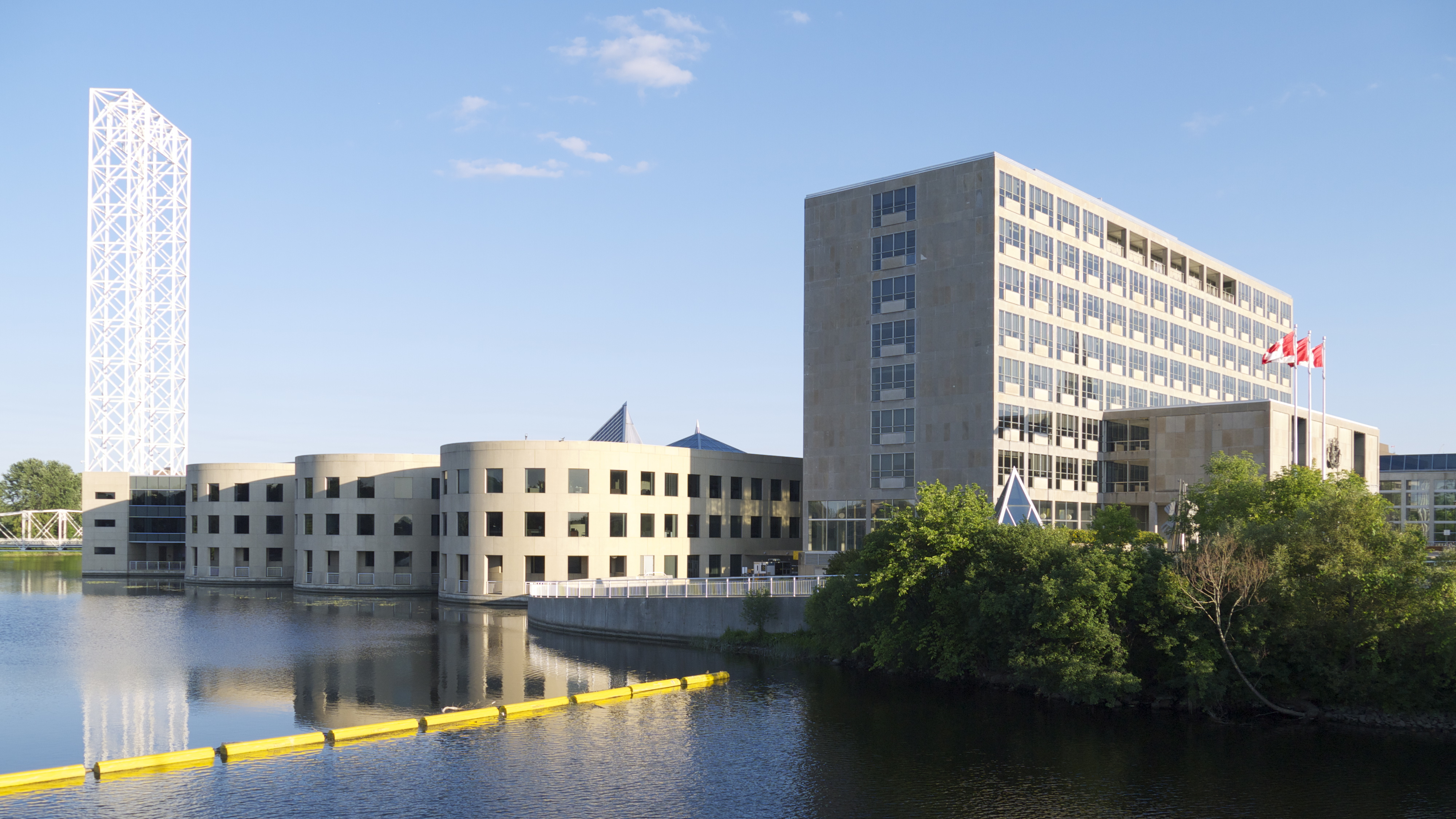
The John G. Diefenbaker Building was Ottawa's fourth city hall, from 1958 until 2001.

Ottawa's former industrial appearance was vastly altered by the 1950 Gréber Plan. Prime Minister Mackenzie King hired French architect-planner Jacques Gréber to design an urban plan for managing development in the National Capital Region to make it more aesthetically pleasing and a location more befitting for Canada's political centre. Gréber's plan included the creation of the National Capital Greenbelt, National Arts Centre, the Kichi Zibi Mikan parkway and Queensway highway system. His plan also called for the movement of downtown Union Station (now the Senate of Canada Building) to the suburbs, the removal of the street car system, the decentralization of selected government offices, and the relocation of industries and removal of substandard housing from the downtown.

While not every recommendation in the Grébér Plan was acted upon—for example, city hall was not placed on the east side of the canal—the plan's open space recommendations did lead to the creation of spaces such as the Rideau Canal and Ottawa River pathways. A major precondition to the creation of the Rideau Canal pathway was the elimination of direct rail service into downtown, leading to the abandonment of the Ottawa Train Station as the city's main station.

The 1958 National Capital Act established the National Capital Commission as a crown corporation. It officially began work in 1959. This marked the creation of a permanent political infrastructure for managing the capital region. These included plans from the 1899 Ottawa Improvement Commission (OIC), the Todd Plan in 1903, the Holt Report in 1915 and the Federal District Commission (FDC). The National Capital Commission's structure supplanted the Federal District Commission, which was established in 1927 with a 16-year funding commitment but was reliant on the voluntary transfer of municipal planning authorities from the district's municipalities.

In 1958, a new city hall opened on Green Island near Rideau Falls, where urban renewal had recently transformed this industrial location into a green space. Prior to this, from 1931 to 1958, city hall had been at the Transportation Building adjacent to Union Station (now part of the Rideau Centre). In 2001, Ottawa City Hall returned downtown to a 1990 building on 110 Laurier Avenue West, the home of the now-defunct Regional Municipality of Ottawa-Carleton. This new location was close to Ottawa's first (1849–1877) and second (1877–1931) city halls. This new city hall complex also contained an adjacent 19th-century restored heritage building formerly known as the Ottawa Normal School.

From the 1960s to the 1980s, there was a large increase in construction in the National Capital Region, which was followed by large growth in the high-tech industry during the 1980s and 1990s. Ottawa became one of Canada's largest high-tech cities and was nicknamed Silicon Valley North. By the 1980s, Bell Northern Research (later Nortel) employed thousands, and large federally assisted research facilities such as the National Research Council contributed to an eventual technology boom. The early companies led to the establishment of newer firms such as Newbridge Networks, Mitel and Corel.

In 1981, Ottawa was the site of the Kitchen Accord, federal-provincial negotiations that led to patriation of the Canadian constitution.

In 1991, provincial and federal governments responded to a land claim submitted by the Algonquins of Ontario regarding the unceded status of the land on which Ottawa is situated. Negotiations have been ongoing, with an eventual goal to sign a treaty that would release Canada from claims for misuse of land under Algonquin title, affirm rights of the Algonquins, and negotiate conditions of the title transfer, with an agreement in principle arranged in 2016.

=== 21st Century ===
Ottawa's city limits have expanded over time, including a large expansion effective 1 January 2001, when the province of Ontario amalgamated all the constituent municipalities of the Regional Municipality of Ottawa–Carleton into a single city of Ottawa. Regional Chair Bob Chiarelli was elected as the new city's first mayor in the 2000 municipal election, defeating Gloucester mayor Claudette Cain. On 15 October 2001, a diesel-powered light rail transit (LRT) line was introduced on an experimental basis. Known today as O-Train Line 2, it was initially dubbed simply "the O-Train", and it connected downtown Ottawa to the southern suburbs via Carleton University. The decision to extend the O-Train and to replace it with an electric light rail system was a major issue in the 2006 municipal elections, where Chiarelli was defeated by businessman Larry O'Brien. After O'Brien's election, transit plans were changed to establish a series of light rail stations from the east side of the city into downtown and for using a tunnel through the downtown core.

In October 2012, the City Council approved the final Lansdowne Park plan, an agreement with the Ottawa Sports and Entertainment Group that saw a new stadium, increased green space and housing and retail added to the site. In December 2012, City Council voted unanimously to move forward with the Confederation Line, a 12.5 km (7.8 mi) light rail transit line, which was opened on 14 September 2019.

In 2020, the city saw a major change in the nature of work due to civil servants without necessary on-site functions moving to online work as a response to the COVID-19 pandemic, with many government workers shifting to online work. This arrangement continued until the gradual return to in-person work beginning in 2022, when federal workers returned to two mandatory days in-office per week. This would increase to four mandatory days in-office per week in 2026.

In 2022, a movement protesting COVID-19 restrictions called The Freedom Convoy, drew large numbers of Canadians, including those from outside Ottawa. This led to the occupation of Wellington Street in Canada's parliamentary precinct, as well as secondary sites outside downtown Ottawa. The movement was associated with the trucking social identity and was preceded by a "Convoy to Ottawa" phase. The occupation began on 29 January and lasted approximately three and a half weeks, ending after the federal government invoked the Emergencies Act on 14 February and pursued enforcement action against the protesters, such as debanking of over 250 protestor bank accounts and later carrying out arrests on 19 February.

== Geography ==
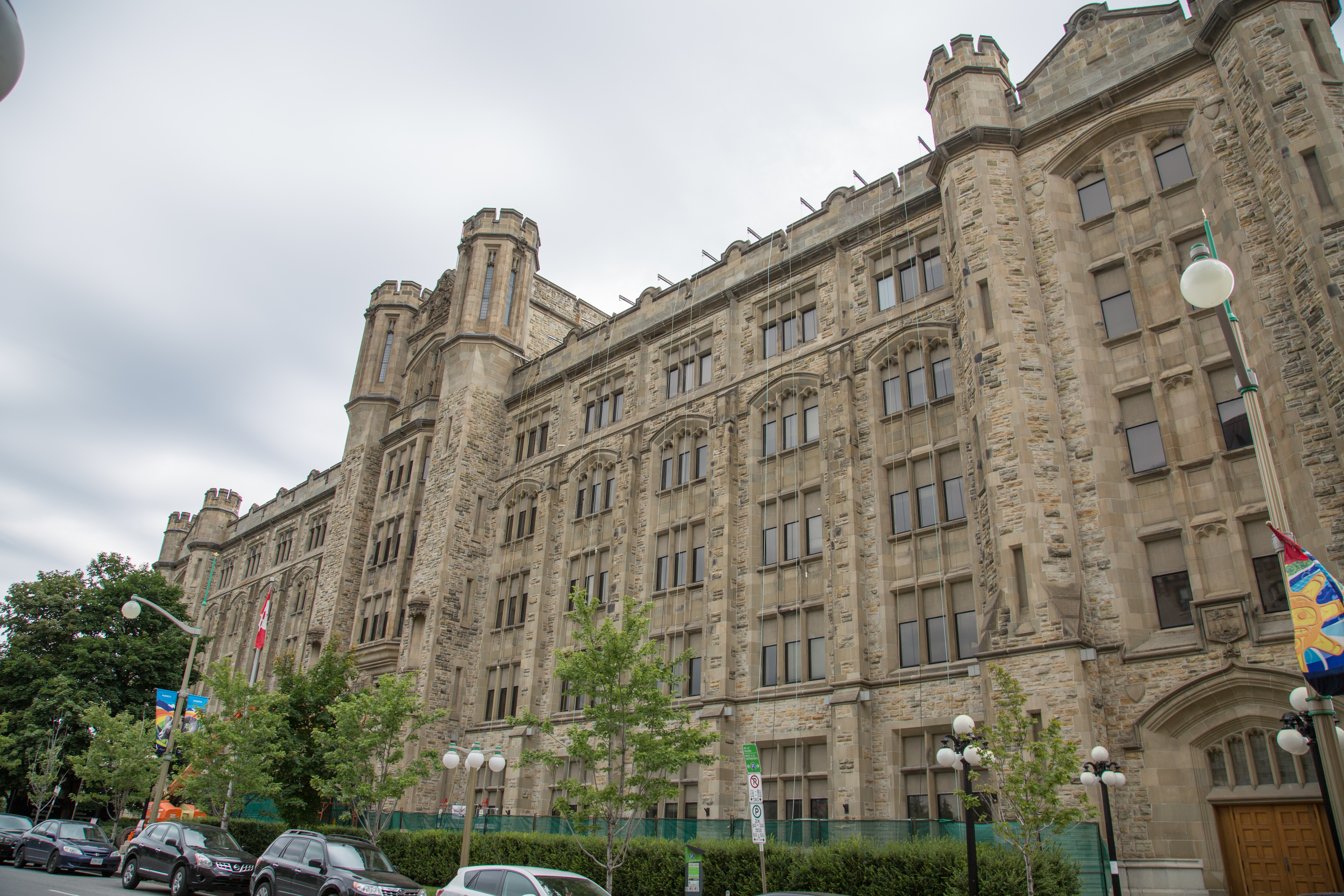
Completed in 1913, the Connaught Building was constructed in a Gothic Revival style.

Ottawa is located in the southeastern part of Ontario.

=== Districts and neighbourhoods ===
The present-day city of Ottawa consists of the historic main urban area, as well as other urban, suburban and rural areas within the city's post-amalgamation limits, as well as exurban villages.

==== Central Ottawa, East End, South End, West End ====
Central Ottawa and the West, South and East ends form a large portion of the pre-amalgamation city, as well as the former city of Vanier—a densely populated, historically Francophone, working class enclave. The Prime Minister's official residence, 24 Sussex, as well as the de facto residence Rideau Cottage and the Governor General's residence, Rideau Hall are all located in the New Edinburgh neighbourhood, These areas include the downtown core and other early-developed neighbourhoods to the east, west, and south. These areas include the affluent neighbourhoods of The Glebe, Old Ottawa South, Westboro, and Rockcliffe Park, and the historically blue-collar communities of Hintonburg, Mechanicsville, and LeBreton Flats. They also include the ethnic enclaves of Chinatown and Little Italy.

==== Suburbs and outlying communities ====
Map of Ottawa showing urban areas and names of historical communities

In 1968, the Region of Ottawa-Carleton was formed, creating a two-tier municipality out of 11 townships, two cities and three villages. In the process, the county of Carleton was dissolved and the Township of Cumberland was subsumed from Russell County.

In 2001, the two-tier municipality was converted to a one-tier municipality, merging the regional government and existing lower-tier municipalities into a single city.

Ottawa is bounded by the United Counties of Prescott and Russell to the east; by Renfrew County and Lanark County to the west; by the United Counties of Leeds and Grenville and the United Counties of Stormont, Dundas and Glengarry to the south; and by the Regional County Municipality of Les Collines-de-l'Outaouais and the City of Gatineau to the north.

The main suburban areas extend over ten kilometers from the city's downtown. These areas also include the former cities of Cumberland, Gloucester (with the large suburban district of Orleans outside the greenbelt split between them), Kanata, and Nepean. The towns of Stittsville and Richmond, part of the former Goulbourn Township, are to the southwest. Nepean, as a suburb, also includes Barrhaven. The communities of Manotick and Riverside South are on the west side of the Rideau River, and Greely is southeast of Riverside south.

A number of rural communities (villages and hamlets) are also part of the City of Ottawa. Some of these communities include Burritts Rapids; Ashton; Fallowfield; Kars; Fitzroy Harbour; Munster; Carp; North Gower; Metcalfe; Constance Bay and Osgoode. Several towns are within the federally defined National Capital Region but outside of Ottawa's municipal boundaries; including Cantley, Chelsea and Pontiac, and parts of Gatineau, l’Ange-Gardien, La Pêche, Notre-Dame-de-la-Salette and Val-des-Monts, and Mississippi Mills. Even further areas may be part of the Ottawa-Gatineau Census Metropolitan Area, but not part of the City of Ottawa, City of Gatineau, or the National Capital Region, such as North Grenville.

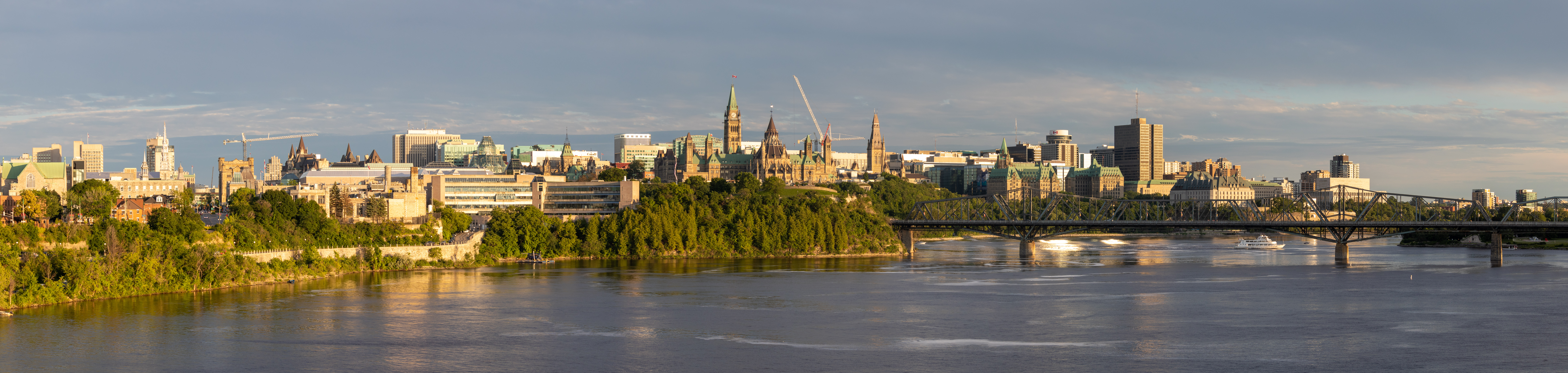
Ottawa above the Ottawa River in 2017, left to right— Byward Market · Fairmont Château Laurier · National Gallery of Canada · Parliament Hill with Library of Parliament and Peace Tower · Alexandra Bridge · Downtown Ottawa towers · Supreme Court of Canada

=== Architecture, built environment and urban planning ===
Influenced by government structures, much of the city's architecture tends to be formal and functional. The city is also marked by Romantic and Picturesque styles of architecture such as the Parliament Buildings' gothic revival architecture. Ottawa's domestic architecture contains single-family homes, but also includes smaller numbers of semi-detached houses, rowhouses, and apartment buildings, including those build before the 21st century. Many domestic buildings in Centretown are clad in red brick, with trim in wood, stone, or metal. Variations are common, depending on the cultural heritage of the neighbourhoods and the time they were built.

East of the Rideau Canal and West of the Rideau river lays much of the original footprint of Bytown, specifically Lower Town, a large portion of which is now comprised in the Lowertown West and Byward heritage districts.

Across the canal to the west lie both Downtown Ottawa, which grew out of the historical Upper Town portion of Bytown. Centretown shares a border with Downtown along Gloucester Street. These core neighbourhoods contain streets such as Somerset, Elgin and Bank, which fill the role of commercial main streets in the neighbourhood.

Many federal buildings in the National Capital Region are managed by Public Works Canada, the federal government's infrastructure management arm, which manages heritage conservation in its renovations and management of buildings, such as the renovation of the Senate Building. Downtown Ottawa includes a substantial economic and architectural government presence across multiple branches of government. The legislature's work takes place in the parliamentary precinct, which includes buildings on Parliament Hill and others downtown, such as the Senate of Canada Building. Architects involved in the design of the original Parliament Hill buildings include Thomas Fuller and Chillion Jones, who designed the now-replaced Centre Block, Thomas Stent and Augustus Laver who designed East and West BLocks, and landscape architecture by Central Park architect Calvert Vaux. Important buildings in the executive branch include the Office of the Prime Minister and Privy Council as well as many civil service buildings. The Supreme Court of Canada building can also be found in this area.

The skyline has been controlled by building height restrictions, originally implemented to keep Parliament Hill and the 92.2 meter (302 ft) Peace Tower at visible from most parts of the city. The restriction prevented construction of buildings exceeding 150 feet through at least the 1950s, and in the 1960s the limit was raised to just under the Peace Tower's absolute height above sea level. Today, several buildings are slightly taller than the Peace Tower structurally, with the tallest being the Claridge Icon at 143 metres (469 ft).

During part of the winter season the Ottawa section of the canal forms the world's largest skating rink, thereby providing both a recreational venue and a 7.8-kilometre (4.8 mi) transportation path to downtown for ice skaters (from Carleton University to the Senate of Canada building). On 29 June 2007, the Rideau Canal was recognized as a UNESCO World Heritage Site.

Across the Ottawa River, which forms the border between Ontario and Quebec, lies the city of Gatineau, itself the result of amalgamation of the former Quebec municipalities of Gatineau, Hull and Aylmer. Although formally and administratively separate cities in two different provinces, Ottawa and Gatineau (along with several nearby municipalities) collectively constitute the National Capital Region, which is considered a single metropolitan area. One federal Crown corporation, the National Capital Commission, or NCC, has significant land holdings in both cities, including sites of historical and touristic importance. The NCC holds control over 11% of all land in the National Capital Region, including most of the federal lands in the City of Ottawa, but does not control, for example, the Parliament of Canada or the Supreme Court of Canada. The National Capital Commission's appropriations powers and its control of large tracts of undeveloped land give the National Capital Commission a great deal of influence over the city's development.Around the main urban area is the National Capital Greenbelt, an extensive greenbelt, administered by the NCC for conservation and leisure, and comprising mostly forest, farmland and marshland.

=== Climate ===
Ottawa has a warm-summer humid continental climate (Köppen: Dfb) corresponding to having four distinct seasons. The climate falls in Zone 5a on the Canadian Plant Hardiness Scale.

In January, the coldest month, the average minimum temperature is -14.3°C (6°F). The majority of days in December, January and February typically remain below freezing. Typically, almost every day of January, February and March, have more than 5 cm of snowpack (29, 28, and 22 days respectively), and on average, approximately 13 days a year see 5 cm or more of snowfall, with 4 of those having over 10 cm. On average, 232 cm (91 in) of snow falls in a year, mainly from December through March. Snow occasionally occur in April or October, but snowfall is light and rarely accumulates in significant quantities.

Outbreaks of polar air often cause frigid temperatures. On average, there are 16 nights in a year in which the temperature falls below -20°C (-4°F). Extremely low temperatures, below -30°C (-22°F), occur on average approximately once every two years.

Summers are warm and humid. In July, the hottest month, the average maximum temperature is 27°C (81°F). On average, there are 15 days in a year that have temperatures exceeding 30°C (86°F). Heatwaves are common and may lead to temperatures in excess of 35°C (95°F). Humidity is generally high at all times of the year, but is most noticeable in the summer. On average, there are 23 days in a year with thunderstorms, with the majority occurring in the summer.

Spring and autumn, while transitional, can see extremes in temperature. For example, it is not unusual for the month of May to have nights below freezing, nor is it for temperatures to exceed 30°C (86°F). Transition can move sharply between months; September sometimes sees temperatures in excess of 30°C, while October can see temperatures below freezing, and November temperatures below -10°C.

On average, days with fog are seen 23 days per year, and they are likely to occur in all seasons.

Annual rainfall averages around 757 mm (29.8 in), while total precipitation averages 930 mm (36.6 in). Days with any precipitation is spread fairly evenly throughout the year, but high precipitation days are more common in late summer and early fall.

In a typical year, Ottawa experiences about 2,080 hours of sunshine annually (45% of possible), with June, July and August being the sunniest period after accounting for time between sunrise and sunset. Prevailing winds are generally from the West.

Climate data for Ottawa International Airport, 1991–2020 normals, extremes 1938–present
Month	Jan	Feb	Mar	Apr	May	Jun	Jul	Aug	Sep	Oct	Nov	Dec	Year
Record high humidex	13.9	15.1	30.0	35.1	41.8	46.5	47.2	47.0	42.5	33.9	26.1	18.4	47.2
Record high °C (°F)	12.9 (55.2)	15.7 (60.3)	27.4 (81.3)	31.1 (88.0)	35.8 (96.4)	36.1 (97.0)	36.9 (98.4)	37.8 (100.0)	35.1 (95.2)	30.9 (87.6)	23.9 (75.0)	17.9 (64.2)	37.8 (100.0)
Mean maximum °C (°F)	6.8 (44.2)	6.5 (43.7)	13.8 (56.8)	24.0 (75.2)	30.1 (86.2)	32.3 (90.1)	32.6 (90.7)	32.2 (90.0)	29.7 (85.5)	23.8 (74.8)	16.9 (62.4)	9.3 (48.7)	34.0 (93.2)
Mean daily maximum °C (°F)	−5.5 (22.1)	−3.6 (25.5)	2.4 (36.3)	11.3 (52.3)	19.6 (67.3)	24.4 (75.9)	27.0 (80.6)	25.8 (78.4)	21.0 (69.8)	13.0 (55.4)	5.8 (42.4)	−1.9 (28.6)	11.6 (52.9)
Daily mean °C (°F)	−10.0 (14.0)	−8.5 (16.7)	−2.4 (27.7)	5.9 (42.6)	13.6 (56.5)	18.7 (65.7)	21.2 (70.2)	20.1 (68.2)	15.3 (59.5)	8.2 (46.8)	1.7 (35.1)	−5.8 (21.6)	6.5 (43.7)
Mean daily minimum °C (°F)	−14.3 (6.3)	−13.2 (8.2)	−7.1 (19.2)	0.5 (32.9)	7.5 (45.5)	12.9 (55.2)	15.4 (59.7)	14.3 (57.7)	9.6 (49.3)	3.4 (38.1)	−2.4 (27.7)	−9.6 (14.7)	1.4 (34.5)
Mean minimum °C (°F)	−26.8 (−16.2)	−23.6 (−10.5)	−19.1 (−2.4)	−6.9 (19.6)	0.1 (32.2)	5.7 (42.3)	10.3 (50.5)	8.7 (47.7)	2.1 (35.8)	−3.8 (25.2)	−11.7 (10.9)	−21.7 (−7.1)	−27.7 (−17.9)
Record low °C (°F)	−35.6 (−32.1)	−36.1 (−33.0)	−30.6 (−23.1)	−16.7 (1.9)	−5.6 (21.9)	−0.1 (31.8)	5.0 (41.0)	2.6 (36.7)	−3.0 (26.6)	−8.0 (17.6)	−21.7 (−7.1)	−34.4 (−29.9)	−36.1 (−33.0)
Record low wind chill	−47.8	−47.6	−42.7	−26.3	−10.9	0.0	0.0	0.0	−6.4	−13.3	−29.5	−44.6	−47.8
Average precipitation mm (inches)	70.4 (2.77)	49.5 (1.95)	66.3 (2.61)	81.3 (3.20)	74.8 (2.94)	96.8 (3.81)	88.5 (3.48)	79.0 (3.11)	89.6 (3.53)	87.4 (3.44)	73.9 (2.91)	72.4 (2.85)	929.8 (36.61)
Average rainfall mm (inches)	29.3 (1.15)	14.5 (0.57)	34.6 (1.36)	69.6 (2.74)	74.5 (2.93)	96.8 (3.81)	88.5 (3.48)	79.0 (3.11)	90.6 (3.57)	84.7 (3.33)	60.5 (2.38)	34.7 (1.37)	757.2 (29.81)
Average snowfall cm (inches)	59.2 (23.3)	48.5 (19.1)	38.8 (15.3)	12.2 (4.8)	0.2 (0.1)	0.0 (0.0)	0.0 (0.0)	0.0 (0.0)	0.0 (0.0)	2.7 (1.1)	20.7 (8.1)	49.6 (19.5)	231.9 (91.3)
Average precipitation days (≥ 0.2 mm)	16.7	13.0	12.6	12.1	13.4	13.9	12.1	11.2	12.4	14.1	14.4	16.7	162.7
Average rainy days (≥ 0.2 mm)	4.9	3.7	6.8	11.0	13.4	13.9	12.1	11.2	12.3	13.6	10.5	6.6	120.0
Average snowy days (≥ 0.2 cm)	16.4	12.9	8.6	3.2	0.13	0.0	0.0	0.0	0.0	0.87	6.5	13.9	62.3
Average relative humidity (%) (at 15:00)	68.4	62.0	57.0	49.5	49.5	53.5	54.2	55.3	58.4	61.6	66.9	72.3	59.1
Average dew point °C (°F)	−13.5 (7.7)	−12.7 (9.1)	−8.0 (17.6)	−1.9 (28.6)	5.9 (42.6)	12.1 (53.8)	14.9 (58.8)	14.4 (57.9)	10.7 (51.3)	4.0 (39.2)	−2.3 (27.9)	−8.6 (16.5)	1.3 (34.3)
Mean monthly sunshine hours	122.4	114.1	168.5	187.5	210.5	274.0	301.4	231.9	211.5	148.8	92.4	68.8	2,131.7
Percentage possible sunshine	43.1	39.0	45.7	46.3	45.7	58.6	63.7	53.1	56.1	43.7	32.2	25.2	46.0
Source 1: Environment Canada (sunshine 1981–2010)
Source 2: weatherstats.ca (for dewpoint and monthly/yearly average absolute maximum/minimum temperature)

=== Physical geography ===
Ottawa is situated on the south bank of the Ottawa River and contains the mouth of the Rideau River and a terminus of the Rideau Canal. The Rideau Canal (Rideau Waterway) first opened in 1832 and is 202 kilometres (126 mi) long. It connects the Saint Lawrence River on Lake Ontario at Kingston to the Ottawa River near Parliament Hill. The canal was able to bypass the unnavigable sections of the Cataraqui and Rideau rivers and various small lakes along the waterway due to flooding techniques and the construction of 47 water transport locks between the Ottawa River and Lake Ontario.

Ottawa is situated in a lowland on top of Paleozoic carbonate and shale and is surrounded by more craggy Precambrian igneous and metamorphic formations. Ottawa has had fluvial deposition of till and sands, leading to the widespread formation of eskers. There are limited distinct features arising from glacial deposits, but Ottawa was affected by the Late Wisconsian advance. Before the draining of the Champlain Sea, the area had high salinity. After the draining of the sea, the area had pine-dominated forests.

Ottawa is located within the Western Quebec Seismic Zone, and while relatively inactive, the city does occasionally experience earthquakes.

== Demographics ==
Ottawa population pyramid in 2021

Historic Population
Year	Pop.	±%
1901	101,102	—
1911	123,417	+22.1%
1921	152,868	+23.9%
1931	174,056	+13.9%
1941	206,367	+18.6%
1951	246,298	+19.3%
1956	287,244	+16.6%
1961	358,410	+24.8%
1966	413,695	+15.4%
1971	471,931	+14.1%
1976	520,533	+10.3%
1981	546,849	+5.1%
1986	606,639	+10.9%
1991	678,147	+11.8%
1996	721,136	+6.3%
2001	774,072	+7.3%
2006	812,129	+4.9%
2011	883,391	+8.8%
2016	934,243	+5.8%
2021	1,017,449	+8.9%
Note: Population figures are extrapolated for current municipal boundaries Sources: (Note: In early 2001, the Province of Ontario dissolved the former City of Ottawa by amalgamating it with eleven other municipalities to form a new City of Ottawa. The 1996 adjusted population of the amalgamated city published in the 2001 census was 721,136, while the population of the dissolved former City of Ottawa in 2001 was 337,031.); Chart format

In the 2021 Census of Population conducted by Statistics Canada, Ottawa had a population of 1,017,449 living in 407,252 of its 427,113 total private dwellings, a change of 8.9% from its 2016 population of 934,243. With a land area of 2,788.2 square kilometres (1,076.5 sq mi), it had a population density of 364.9/km^{2} (945.1/sq mi) in 2021.

As of 2021, the Ottawa-Gatineau census metropolitan area (CMA) had a population of 1,488,307 living in 604,721 of its 638,013 total private dwellings, a change of 8.5% from its 2016 population of 1,371,576. With a land area of 8,046.99 km^{2} (3,106.96 sq mi), it had a population density of 185.0/km^{2} (479.0/sq mi) in 2021.

Ottawa's median age of 40.0 is slightly below the provincial (41.6) and national (41.6) averages as of 2021. Youths under 15 constituted 16.4% of the city's total population in 2021, while those of retirement age (65 years and older) made up 16.9%.

=== Race, immigrant status and ethnicity ===
As of 2021, approximately 64.9% of Ottawa's population were white or European, while 2.6% were Indigenous, and 32.5% were visible minorities (higher than the national percentage of 26.5%).

The 2021 census reported that immigrants (individuals born outside Canada) number 259,215, 25.9% of the population of Ottawa. Of this immigrant population, the top countries of origin were China (20,320 persons or 7.8%), India (16,200 persons or 6.2%), United Kingdom (14,760 persons or 5.7%), Lebanon (11,900 persons or 4.6%), Philippines (10,505 persons or 4.1%), United States of America (8,795 persons or 3.4%), Haiti (6,710 persons or 2.6%), Syria (6,370 persons or 2.5%), Vietnam (6,155 persons or 2.4%), and Iran (6,000 persons or 2.3%).

=== Religion ===
According to the 2021 census, religious groups in Ottawa included:

- Christianity (528,700 persons or 52.8%)
- Irreligion (316,740 persons or 31.6%)
- Islam (98,920 persons or 9.9%)
- Hinduism (20,300 persons or 2.0%)
- Buddhism (10,800 persons or 1.1%)
- Judaism (10,600 persons or 1.1%)
- Sikhism (6,375 persons or 0.6%)
- Indigenous Spirituality (445 persons or <0.1%)
- Other (8,055 persons or 0.8%)

Of the Christian population, Catholicism was the most widely declared with 303,820 adherents, with the next largest specified group being Anglican with 41,175 adherents.

=== Language ===
As of 2021, those who identify their mother tongue as English constitute 58.2 percent, while those with French as their mother tongue make up 12.5 percent of the population. Regarding respondents' knowledge of one or both official languages, 60.6 percent and 1.4 percent of the population know English and French only, respectively, while 36.4 percent know both official languages. Bilingualism became official policy for the conduct of municipal business in 2002, making it the largest city in Canada with both English and French as co-official languages, as Vancouver, Montreal and Toronto do not have official bilingualism policies. An additional 23.1 percent of the population list languages other than English and French as their mother tongue. These include Arabic (4.3%), Mandarin (2.2%), Spanish (1.4%), Italian (0.8%), and many others.

The overall Ottawa–Gatineau census metropolitan area (CMA) has a larger proportion of French speakers than Ottawa since Gatineau's population's first language is mostly French.

== Economy ==
As of 2016, the region of Ottawa-Gatineau has the sixth-highest total household income of all Canadian metropolitan areas ($82,053), and the Ontario portion more directly overlapping the City of Ottawa has a higher household income ($86,451). The median household income after taxes in the City of Ottawa is $88,000 in 2021 was higher than the national median of $73,000. Prior to the COVID pandemic, Ottawa's unemployment rate has remained below the national and provincial unemployment rates since 2006, with a rate of 5.2% in April 2022, low compared to the decade preceding. Ottawa is ranked the best city in North America for quality of life by Numbeo, but falls short of other Canadian cities in other rankings such as Vancouver and Toronto in Mercer's rankings.

Ottawa's primary employer is the Public Service of Canada. The federal government is the city's largest employer, employing over 128,000 individuals from the National Capital Region as of 2016. The national headquarters for many federal departments are in Ottawa and Gatineau, particularly throughout Centretown, Tunneys Pasture, and in the Terrasses de la Chaudière and Place du Portage complexes in Hull. The National Defence Headquarters in Ottawa is the main command centre for the Canadian Armed Forces. It hosts the Department of National Defence.

As Canada's national capital, tourism is an important part of Ottawa's economy, particularly after the 150th anniversary of Canada, centred in Ottawa. The lead-up to the festivities saw much investment in civic infrastructure, upgrades to tourist infrastructure and increases in national cultural attractions. Depending on methodology and source, the National Capital Region annually attracts an estimated 9.8 to 11 million tourists, who spend about 2.6 billion dollars and support approximately 23,000 jobs directly.

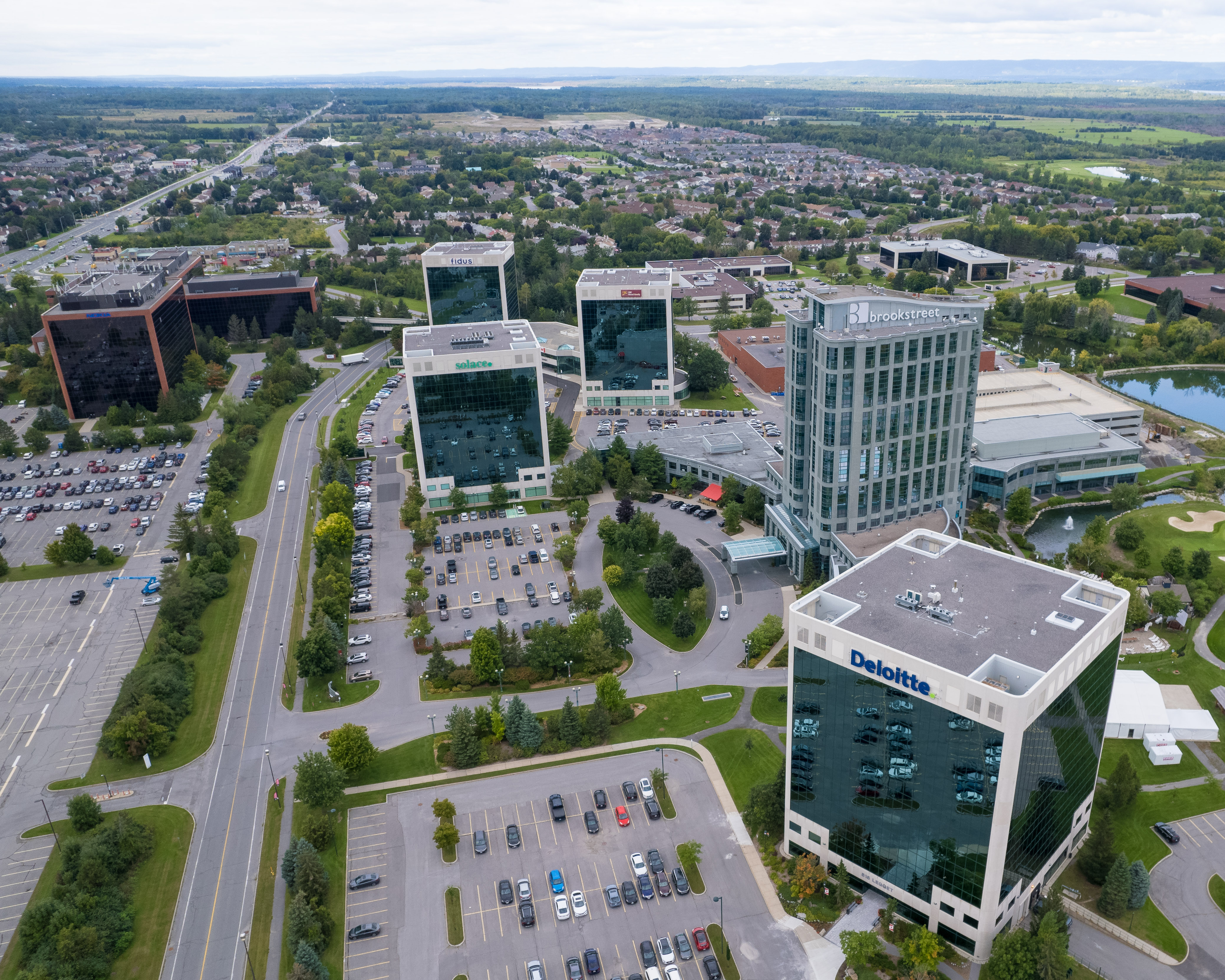
Kanata Research Park is Canada's largest technology park.

In addition to the economic activities that come with being the national capital, Ottawa is an important technology centre; in 2015, its 1800 companies employed approximately 63,400 people. The concentration of companies in this industry earned the city the nickname of "Silicon Valley North." Large technology companies such as Nortel, Corel, Mitel, Cognos, Shopify and JDS Uniphase were founded in the city. As of 2007, Ottawa also had regional offices for Nokia, Adobe Systems, Bell Canada and IBM. Many tech companies, including Mitel, are in the western part of the city (formerly Kanata). The "tech sector" was doing particularly well prior to the dot-com burst, but remains generally strong as of 2016, with more technology jobs than at any time prior to the new millennium. As of 2011, Nordion, Abbott Laboratories and the National Research Council of Canada and OHRI are part of the life science sector in Ottawa.

The health sector is another major employer, which employs over 64,000 people in the city as of the 2020 census. The City of Ottawa is the second largest employer as of 2010, with approximately 2,100 people employed by the Ottawa Police service as of 2022, and 13,300 full-time equivalent non-police employees as of 2019.

All major clusters tracked by the city saw increases in employment between 2014 and 2019, with the exception of culture and tourism. Major areas of growth in the 2010s included local and federal administration, finance and accommodation. Between 2008 and 2020, there was growth in the number of government employees and a reduction in high-tech jobs, a reversal of previous trends from 2003 to 2008. The city has experienced a weak labour market recovery in the years since the onset of the COVID-19 pandemic. Ottawa has also seen above average disruption to the economy due to American tariff policy during the second term of President Donald Trump.

Ottawa already has the largest rural economy among Canada's major cities. In Ottawa, the rural economy contributes over $1 billion to the GDP. Agriculture alone accounts for $400 million, $136.7 million of which is farm-gate sales. Rural economic activity includes agriculture, retail sales, construction, forestry and mining (specifically of aggregates), tourism, manufacturing, personal and business services, and transportation. Rural employment expanded by 18% from 1996 to 2001.

=== Media ===
Two daily local newspapers are printed in Ottawa: two English newspapers, the Ottawa Citizen established as the Bytown Packet in 1845 and the Ottawa Sun. The city's last French language daily, Le Droit, has become an online only paper after a 2020-2023 run as a weekly. The city is also home to local stations of the television broadcast networks and systems CBC and CTV, as well as English and French radio stations.

In addition to the market's local media services, Ottawa is home to several national media operations, including CPAC (a private-sector broadcaster of government proceedings) and the parliamentary bureau staff of various major newsgathering organizations in television, radio and print. The city is also home to the head office of the Canadian Broadcasting Corporation.

== Education ==
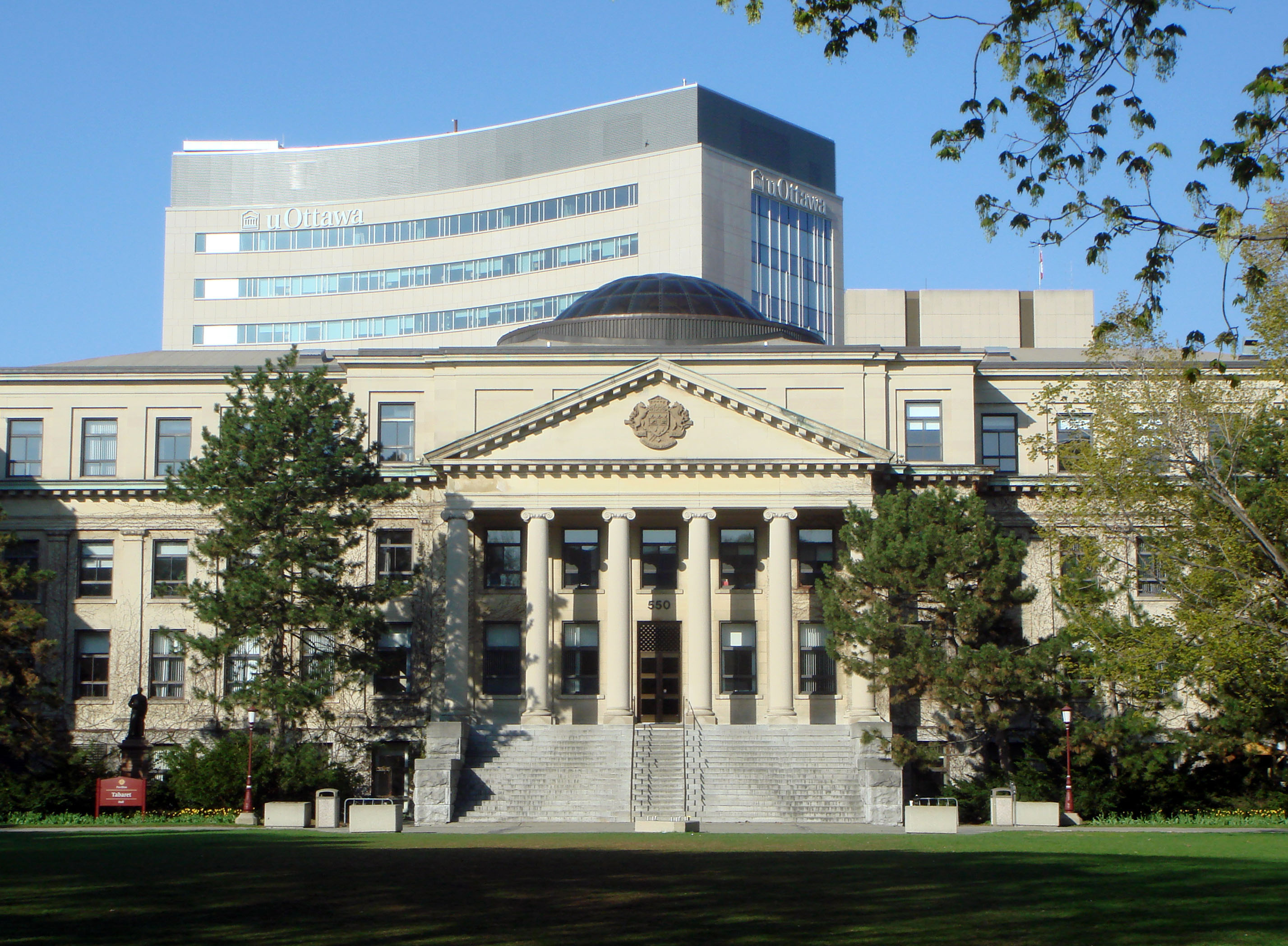
Established in 1848, the University of Ottawa is the oldest post-secondary institution in the city.

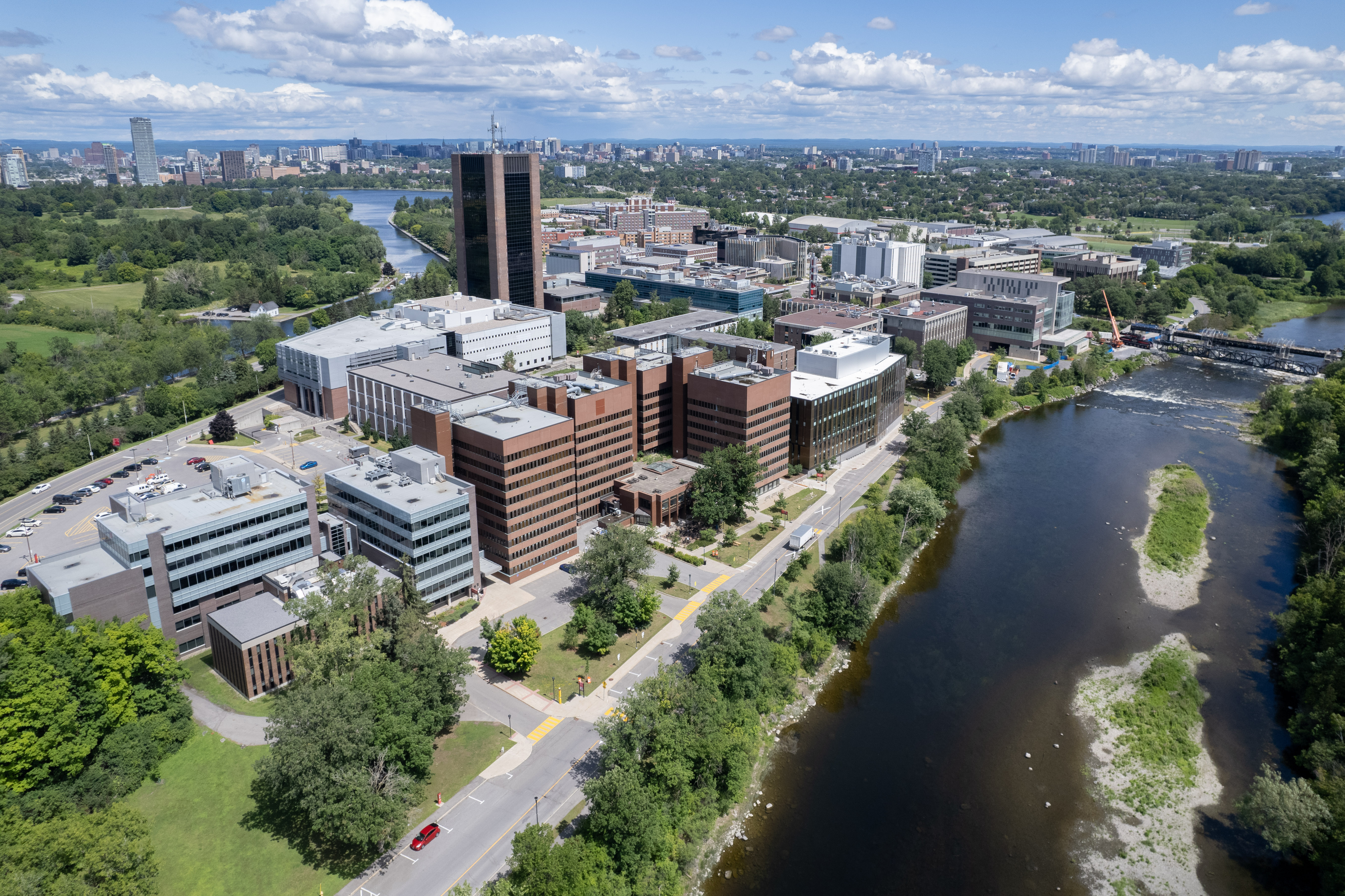
Carleton University in 2022

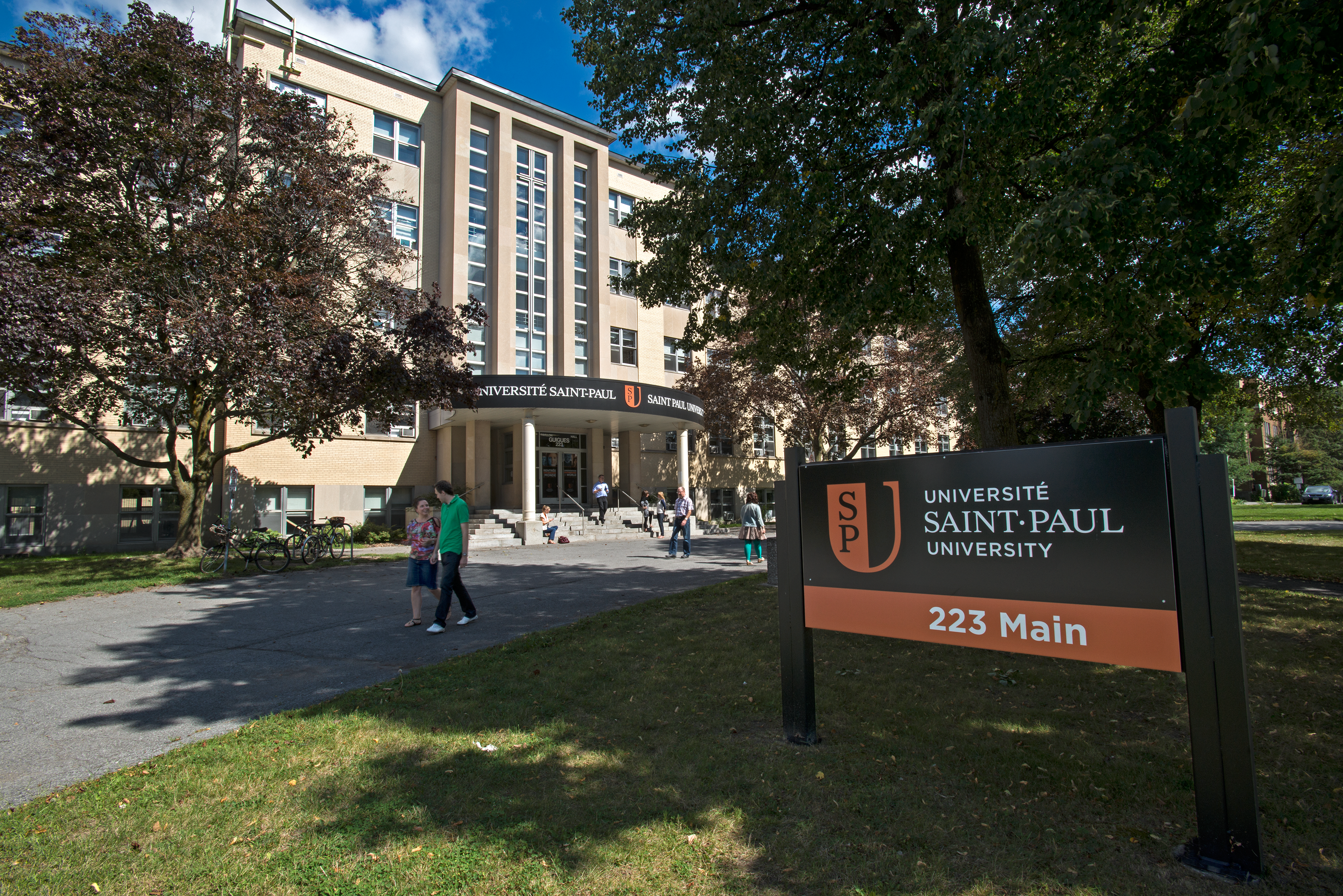
Saint Paul University

=== Primary and secondary education ===
As of 2025, Ottawa has four main public school boards: English, English-Catholic, French, and French-Catholic. The English-language Ottawa-Carleton District School Board (OCDSB) is the largest board with 116 primary schools, 26 secondary schools, 5 alternative learning sites and 1 adult education school, followed by the English-Catholic Ottawa Catholic School Board with 90 schools. The two French-language boards are the French-Catholic Conseil des écoles catholiques du Centre-Est with 46 primary schools and 11 secondary schools, and the French Conseil des écoles publiques de l'Est de l'Ontario with 44 schools. Ottawa also has numerous private schools which are not part of a board.

The Ottawa Public Library was created in 1906 as part of the Carnegie library system. As of 2026 the library system has 1.8 million items, down from 2.3 million in 2008, when it had 33 branches and 2 mobile libraries . Approximately 11.5 million loans were conducted in 2024, approximately 8.2 million physical loans and the remainder digital items. In 2024, the library saw 3.5 million visits.

=== Higher education and public research ===
Over half the population has graduated from college and/or university. As of 2007, Ottawa was claimed by the local business journal to have the highest per capita concentration of engineers, scientists, and residents with PhDs in Canada. The city has two main public universities and two main public colleges.

- Carleton University was founded in 1942 to meet the needs of returning World War II veterans and later became Ontario's first private, non-denominational college. Over time, Carleton transitioned into a comprehensive university that Maclean's ranks 4th out of 15 in its comprehensive category. The university's campus sits between Old Ottawa South and the Central Experimental Farm.
- The University of Ottawa (originally named the "College of Bytown") was the first post-secondary institution established in the city in 1848. The university later grew to become the largest English-French bilingual university in the world. It is also a member of the U15, a group of universities in Canada with high levels of research funding. The university's main campus is in the Sandy Hill neighbourhood, just adjacent to the city's downtown core. The University of Ottawa's has a catholic-affiliated university college, St. Paul University.
- Algonquin College is a college of applied arts and technology founded in 1967. Its main campus is located in the City View neighbourhood of College Ward. The college serves the National Capital Region and the outlying areas of Eastern Ontario. The college has satellite campuses in Pembroke and, until an impending closure in August 2026, Perth.
- Collège La Cité is the largest French-language college in Ontario by number of students. Founded in 1989, its campus is located off the Aviation Parkway in the Carson Meadows neighbourhood.

Other colleges and universities in the metropolitan area are located in the neighbouring suburb of Gatineau, including the University of Quebec in Outaouais, Cégep de l'Outaouais, and Heritage College.

The city is also home to many federal post-secondary associations, including those representing institutions like Polytechnics Canada, Universities Canada, Colleges and Institutes Canada, Association des collèges et universités de la francophonie canadienne, and the U15; those representing educators, such as the Canadian Association of University Teachers; and those representing students, such as the Canadian Alliance of Student Associations, Canadian Federation of Students and the National Educational Association of Disabled Students.

Public research also occurs through government laboratories and research centres such as the National Research Council, various Health Canada laboratories or the Central Experimental Farm.

=== Public health ===
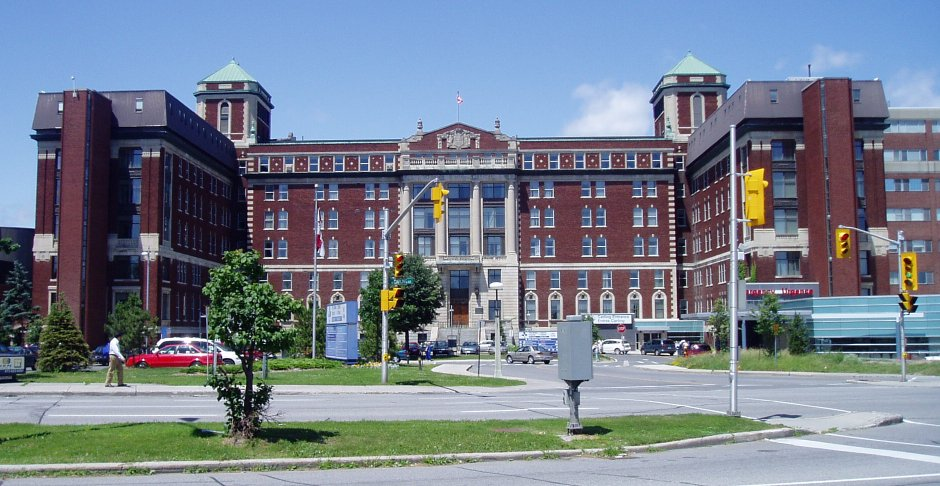
The Civic Hospital is one of three main campuses of The Ottawa Hospital.

There are four active general medical hospitals organizations in the city of Ottawa in six locations: The Queensway Carleton Hospital, The Ottawa Hospital (Civic Hospital, General Hospital, Riverside Hospital), Montfort Hospital, and the Children's Hospital of Eastern Ontario. Several specialized hospital facilities are also present, such as the University of Ottawa Heart Institute, the Royal Ottawa Mental Health Centre, and Élisabeth Bruyère Hospital. There are also several hospitals and major medical centres in neighbouring suburban communities and commuter towns. The University of Ottawa Faculty of Medicine operates teaching hospitals in conjunction with partners throughout the city.

Ottawa is the headquarters of numerous major medical organizations and institutions such as Canadian Red Cross, Canadian Blood Services, Health Canada, Canadian Medical Association, Royal College of Physicians and Surgeons of Canada, Canadian Nurses Association, and the Medical Council of Canada.

== Culture and contemporary life ==
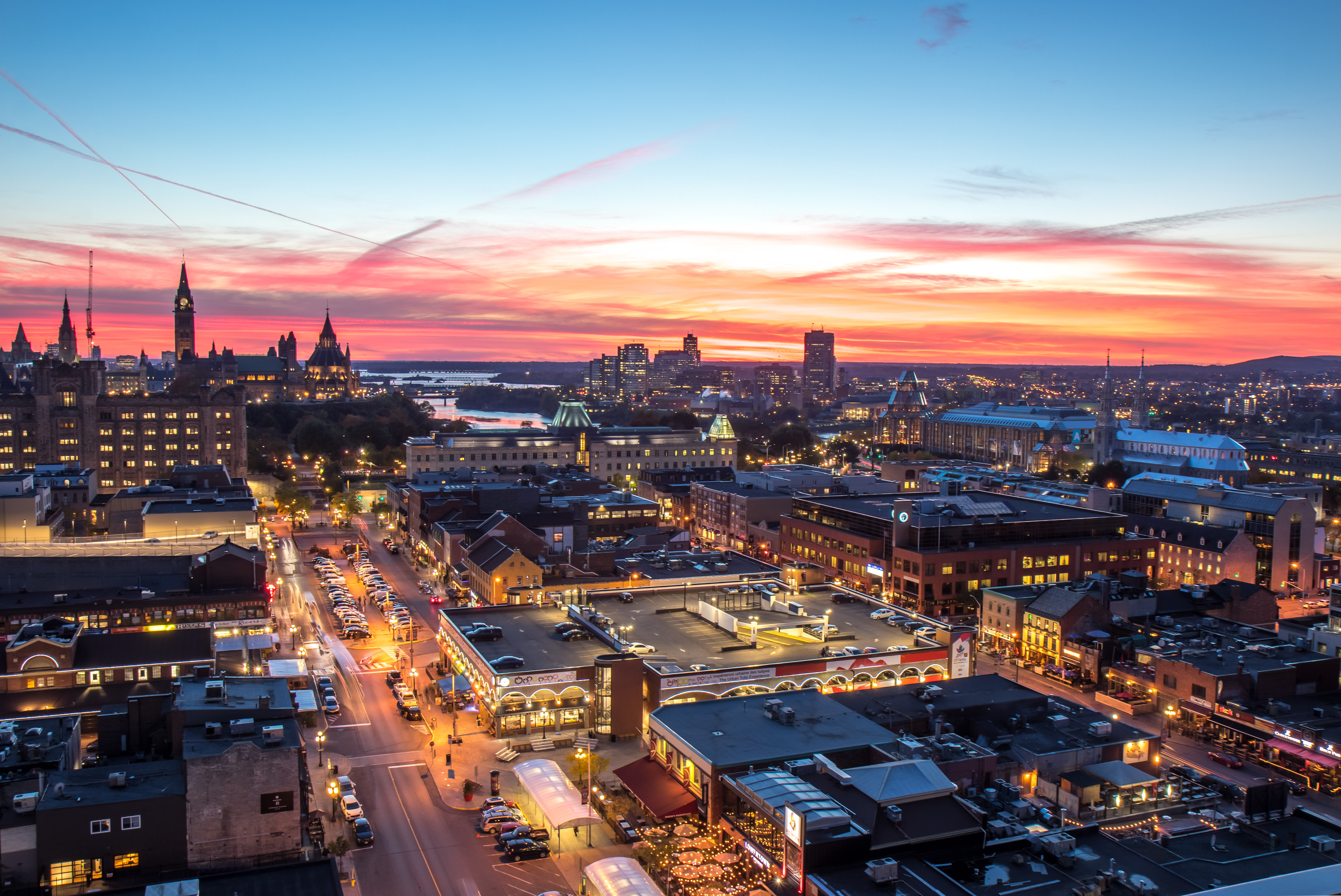
ByWard Market is a retail and entertainment district in Downtown Ottawa.

Traditionally, the ByWard Market (in Lower Town), Parliament Hill, Chinatown, and the Golden Triangle (in Centretown – Downtown) have been focal points of the cultural scenes in Ottawa. Modern thoroughfares such as Wellington Street, Rideau Street, Sussex Drive, Elgin Street, Bank Street, Somerset Street, Preston Street, Wellington Street West, Richmond Road in Westboro, and Sparks Street are home to many boutiques, museums, theatres, galleries, landmarks and memorials in addition to eating establishments, cafes, bars and nightclubs.

As Canada's capital, Ottawa has played host to many significant cultural events in Canadian history, including the first visit of the reigning Canadian sovereign—King George VI, with his consort, Queen Elizabeth—to his parliament, on 19 May 1939. VE Day was marked with a large celebration on 8 May 1945, the first raising of the country's new national flag took place on 15 February 1965, and the centennial of Confederation was celebrated on 1 July 1967. Queen Elizabeth II was in Ottawa on 17 April 1982, to issue a royal proclamation of the enactment of the Constitution Act. In 1983, the then Prince Charles and Diana, Princess of Wales came to Ottawa for a state dinner hosted by then Prime Minister Pierre Trudeau. In 2011, Ottawa was selected as the first city to receive Prince William, Duke of Cambridge, and Catherine, Duchess of Cambridge during their tour of Canada.

During the summer, the city hosts the Ceremonial Guard, which performs functions such as the Changing the Guard.

Ottawa was featured in the short story collection For Your Eyes Only, by Ian Fleming.

Ottawa's reputation with regard to culture and contemporary life does have a mixed review, with an enduring label for the city being "The Town that Fun Forgot", dating back to the 1970s and sometimes still used in local self-critique.

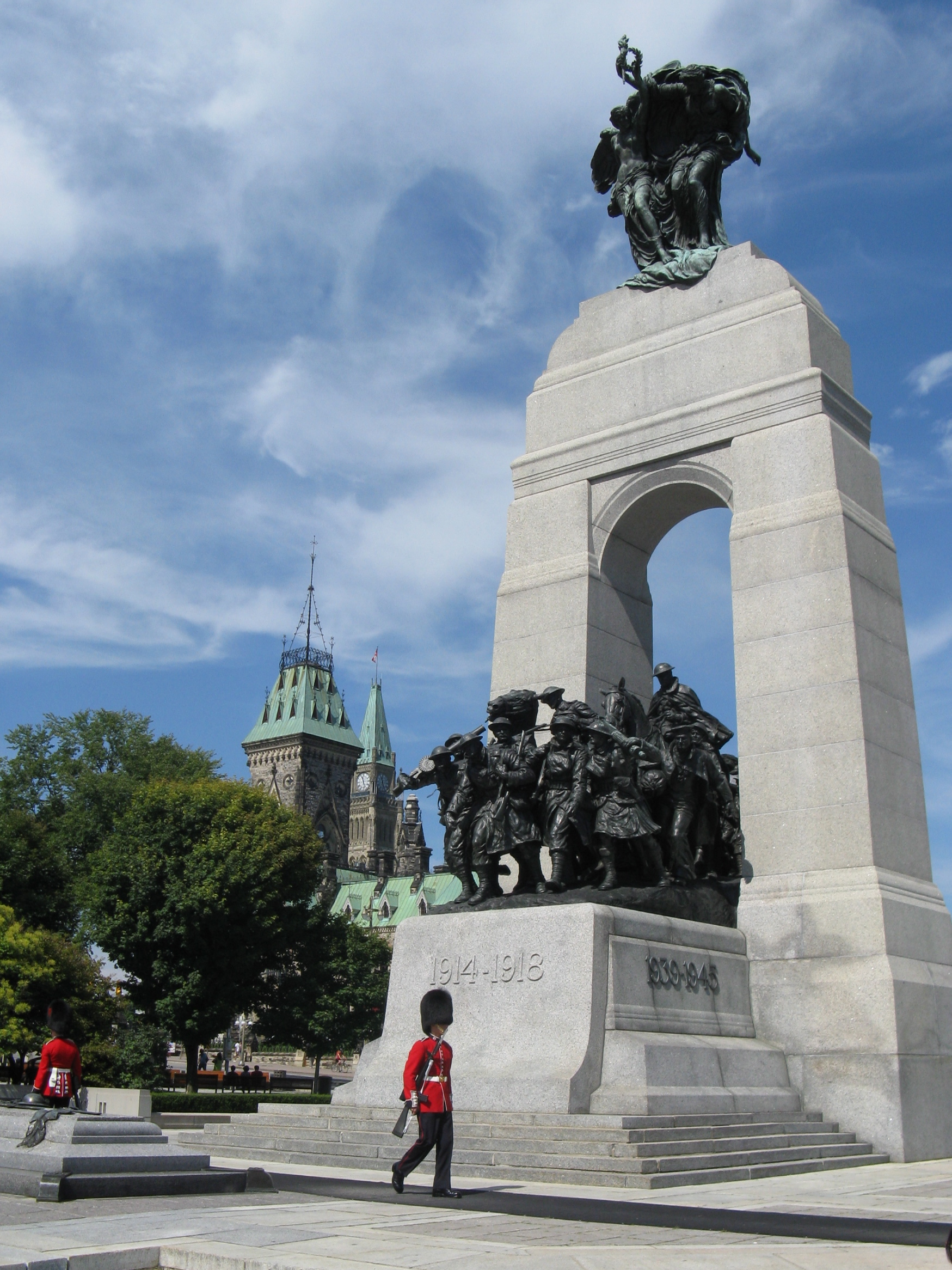
The National War Memorial

=== Landmarks ===
There is one World Heritage Site in Ottawa, the Rideau Canal, along with 27 National Historic Sites of Canada in Ottawa, including the Château Laurier, the Parliament of Canada, Confederation Square, the former Ottawa Teachers' College and Laurier House. Additionally in 1990, Notre Dame Cathedral Basilica was designated as a National Historic Site. Many other properties of cultural value have been designated as having "heritage elements" by the City of Ottawa under Part IV of the Ontario Heritage Act.

=== Arts ===
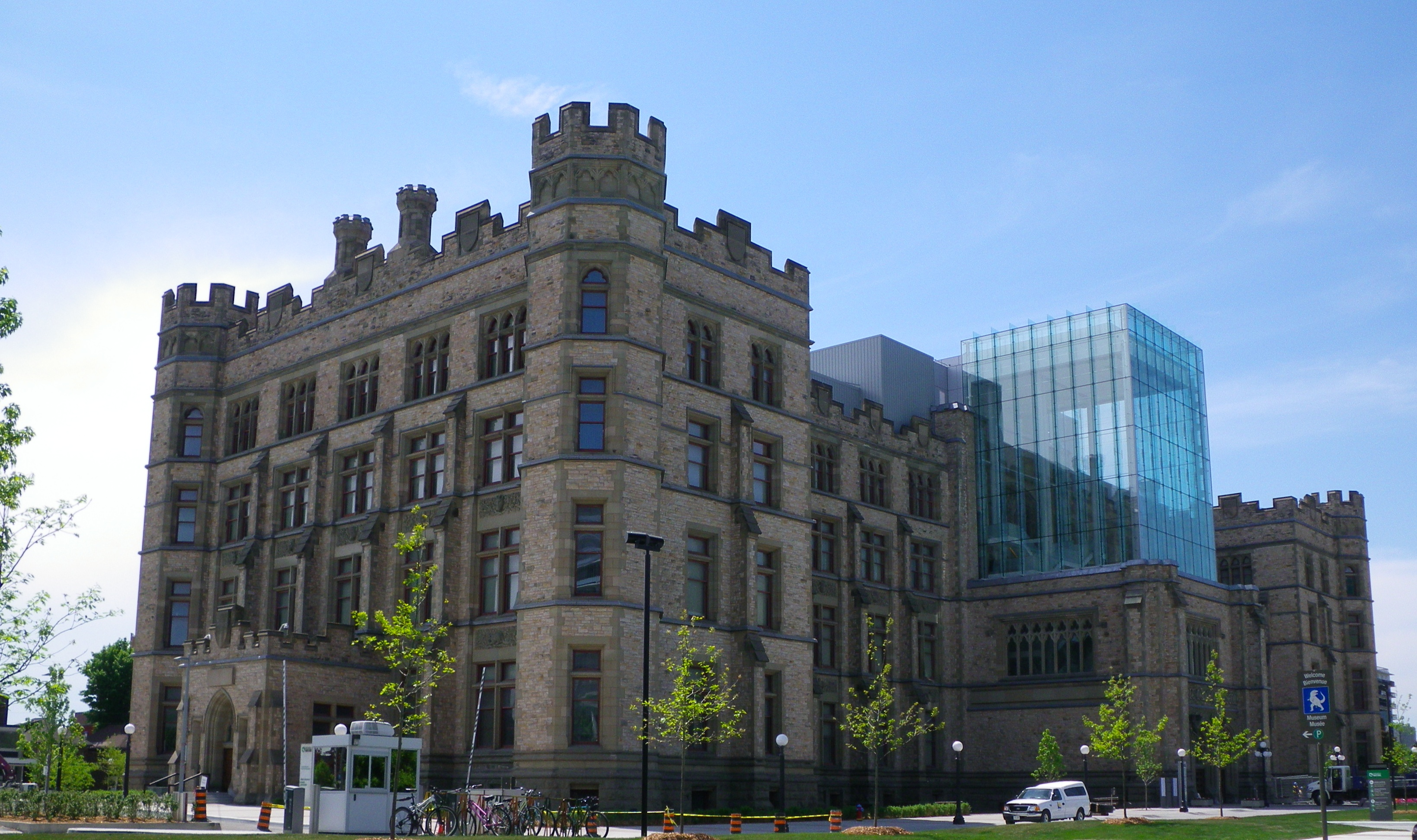
The Canadian Museum of Nature is Canada's national museum of natural history and natural science.

==== Performing and visual arts ====
The Ottawa Little Theatre, founded in 1913 as the Ottawa Drama League, is Ottawa's longest-running community theatre company. Since 1969, Ottawa has been the home of the National Arts Centre, a major performing arts venue that houses four stages and is home to the National Arts Centre Orchestra, and formerly hosted the Opera Lyra Ottawa and the Ottawa Symphony Orchestra prior to their failure and move to Carleton University, respectively.

Established in 1975, the Great Canadian Theatre Company specializes in the production of Canadian plays at a local level. The cities museum landscape is notable for containing six of Canada's nine national museums, the Canada Agriculture and Food Museum, the Canada Aviation and Space Museum, the Canada Science and Technology Museum, Canadian Museum of Nature, Canadian War Museum and National Gallery of Canada. The National Gallery of Canada; designed by famous architect Moshe Safdie, it is a permanent home to the Maman sculpture. The Canadian War Museum houses a collection comprising approximately 600,000 artifacts, photos and books and was moved to an expanded facility in 2005. The Victoria Memorial Museum Building, which houses the Canadian Museum of Nature commenced construction in 1905 and it opened as the National Museum of Natural Sciences in 1912, and underwent a major renovation between 2004 and 2010, leading to a centrepiece Blue Whale skeleton, and the creation of a monthly nightclub experience, Nature Nocturne.

=== Cuisine ===
Ottawa is home to several regional dishes. As a city with traditional French-Canadian roots, staples such as poutine are served throughout the city. However, many consider shawarma a defining or especially common Ottawa dish; as the city contains more shawarma restaurants than anywhere else in Canada. In 2024, Ottawa City Council declared Ottawa as the "Shawarma Capital of Canada" in a unanimous motion Beaver tails, a fried dough pastry, were first created in the Ottawa Valley in the 1970s, and are popular in the city after the creators opened two permanent storefronts in the city. Le Cordon Bleu has a long-established culinary arts institute in the central Ottawa neighbourhood of Sandy Hill, the only Le Cordon Bleu campus in North America. Ottawa style pizza is characterized by a pair of Ottawa pizza podcasters as being greasy, having sweeter sauce, crispy, thick cheese, thick crust, and toppings under the cheese. Other food writers contend Ottawa-style pizza is inextricably linked with Ottawa's Lebanese pizza tradition.

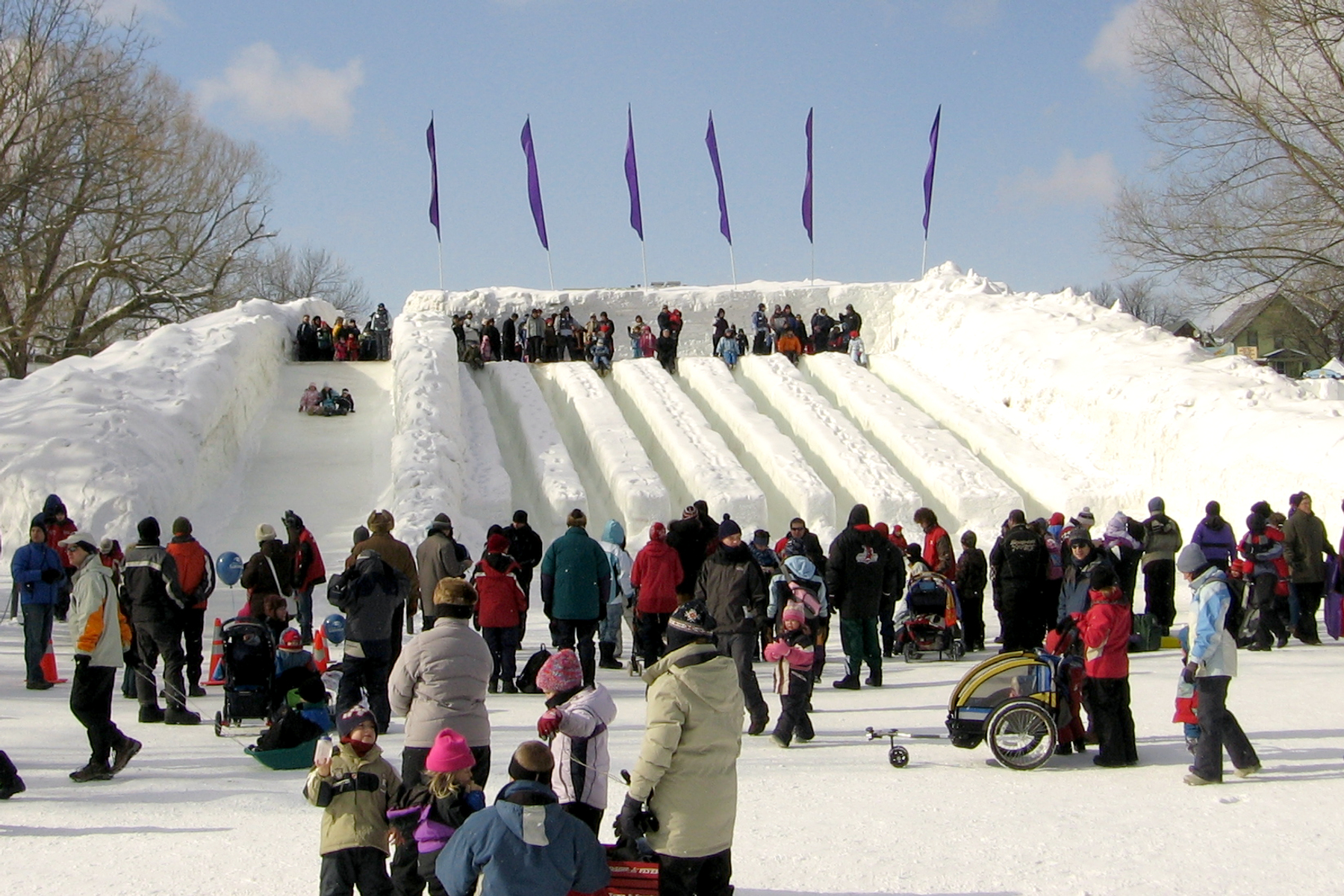
Winterlude is an annual winter festival held in Ottawa.

=== Festivals ===
Ottawa hosts a variety of annual seasonal activities—such as Winterlude, the largest festival in Canada, and Canada Day celebrations on Parliament Hill and surrounding downtown area, as well as Bluesfest, Canadian Tulip Festival, Ottawa Dragon Boat Festival, Ottawa International Jazz Festival, Fringe Festival, Capital Pride, and CityFolk, that have grown to become some of the largest festivals of their kind in the world. In 2010, Ottawa's Festival industry received the IFEA "World Festival and Event City Award" for the category of North American cities with a population between 500,000 and 1,000,000.

== Sports ==
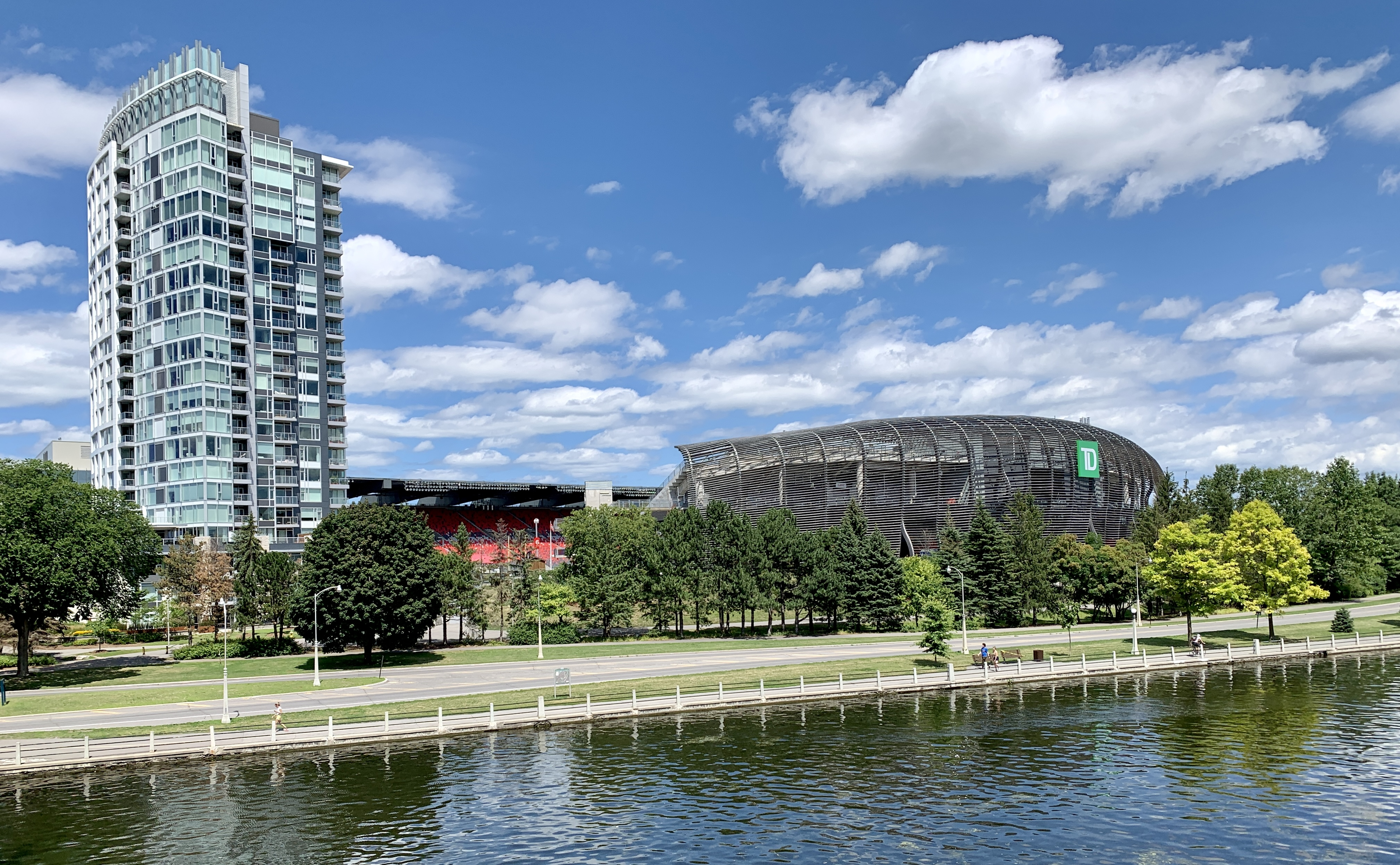
TD Place Stadium is home to the CFL's Ottawa Redblacks, the CPL's Atlético Ottawa, and the NSL's Ottawa Rapid FC.

=== Professional sports ===
Sport in Ottawa has a history dating back to the 19th century. The city is currently home to six professional sports teams. The Ottawa Senators are a professional ice hockey team playing in the National Hockey League. The team shares the name with a previous franchise that won the Stanley Cup four times between 1920 and 1927. The team is currently a member of the Atlantic Division and play their home games at the Canadian Tire Centre. In 2023, the Ottawa Charge became one of the six charter franchises of the Professional Women's Hockey League (PWHL). The Charge play home games at Canadian Tire Centre.

The Ottawa Redblacks are a professional Canadian Football team playing in the Canadian Football League. Formerly the Ottawa Rough Riders represented the city until 1996. With precursors dating back to 1876, the team adopted its identity in 1898 and was one of the oldest and longest-lived professional sports teams in North America. The professional soccer club, Atlético Ottawa, plays in the Canadian Premier League. The team was founded by Spanish club Atlético Madrid, and along with the Redblacks, play their home games at TD Place Stadium. Ottawa Rapid FC of the Northern Super League also play at TD Place Stadium. The Rapid are one of the six founding clubs in the NSL, having played in the inaugural 2025 season. The New York Riptide became Ottawa Black Bears when they moved to the city in 2024. They compete in the National Lacrosse League and play at the Canadian Tire Centre in Kanata. The Ottawa Blackjacks are a professional basketball team, playing in the Canadian Elite Basketball League, out of the TD Place Arena. The Ottawa Titans play professional baseball in the Frontier League at Raymond Chabot Grant Thornton Park. Ottawa was previously home to the Ottawa Lynx, a Triple-A club, as well as the Ottawa Champions, an independent baseball team in the Can-Am League.

=== Collegiate sports ===
The University of Ottawa and Carleton University varsity teams compete in U Sports in various sports. Algonquin College and Collège La Cité teams compete in the OCAA.

The Carleton Ravens are nationally ranked in basketball and soccer as of 2011. Carleton's men's basketball program is regarded as dynastically successful, having won 17 of the last 20 national championships. The Ottawa Gee-Gees are nationally ranked in basketball and soccer as of 2022.

=== Semi-professional and amateur sports ===
Several non-professional teams also play in Ottawa, including the Ottawa 67's junior ice hockey team.

The city is home to an assortment of amateur organized team sports such as soccer, basketball, baseball and curling. Casual recreational activities, such as skating, cycling and skiing are also available.

The city has hosted Ottawa Race Weekend during the 4th weekend of May since 1975. In addition, Ironman Triathlon began in Ottawa in 2025.

== Government and politics ==
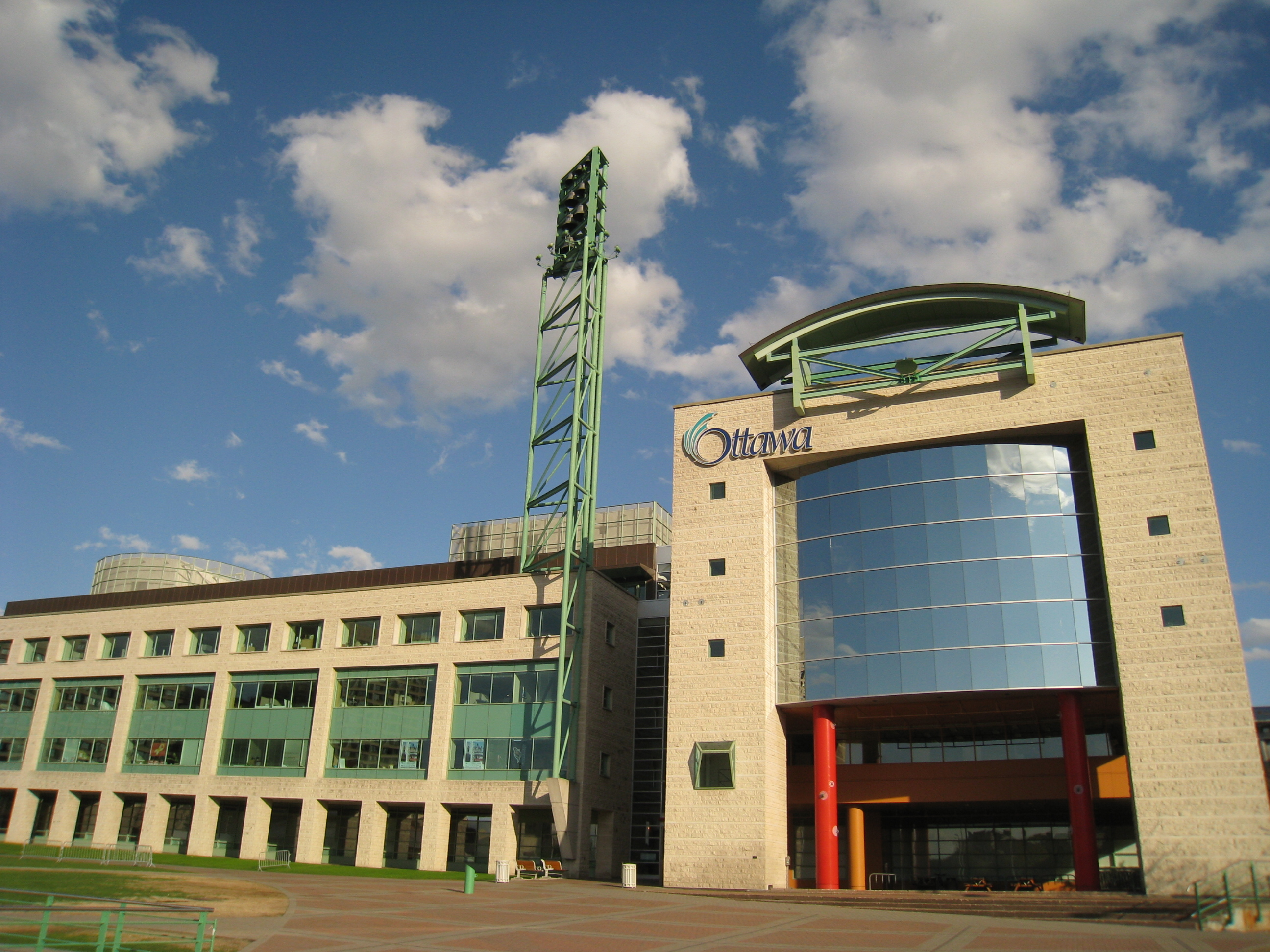
Ottawa City Hall houses the seat of the local government.

The City of Ottawa is a single-tier municipality, meaning it is in itself a census division and has no county or regional municipality government above it, and has no subsidiary municipalities to provide municipal services. Ottawa is governed by the 25-member Ottawa City Council consisting of 24 councillors each representing one ward. The 25th member, the mayor, Mark Sutcliffe as of the 2026 Ottawa municipal election, is elected in a citywide vote. Ottawa is subject to Ontario's strong mayor powers.

Along with being the capital of Canada, Ottawa is politically diverse in local politics. Most of the city has traditionally supported the Liberal Party in federal elections. The safest areas for the Liberals are the ones dominated by Francophones, especially in Vanier and central Gloucester. Central Ottawa is usually more left-leaning, and the New Democratic Party have won ridings there. Ridings further outside the city centre, such as those including Kanata, Barrhaven and rural areas, tend to be more conservative, fiscally and socially. This is especially true in the former Townships of West Carleton, Goulbourn, Rideau and Osgoode, which are more in line with the conservative areas in the surrounding counties.

At present, Ottawa is host to approximately 150 embassies. A further approximately 50 countries accredit their embassies and missions in the United States to Canada.

== Transportation ==
=== Public transportation ===
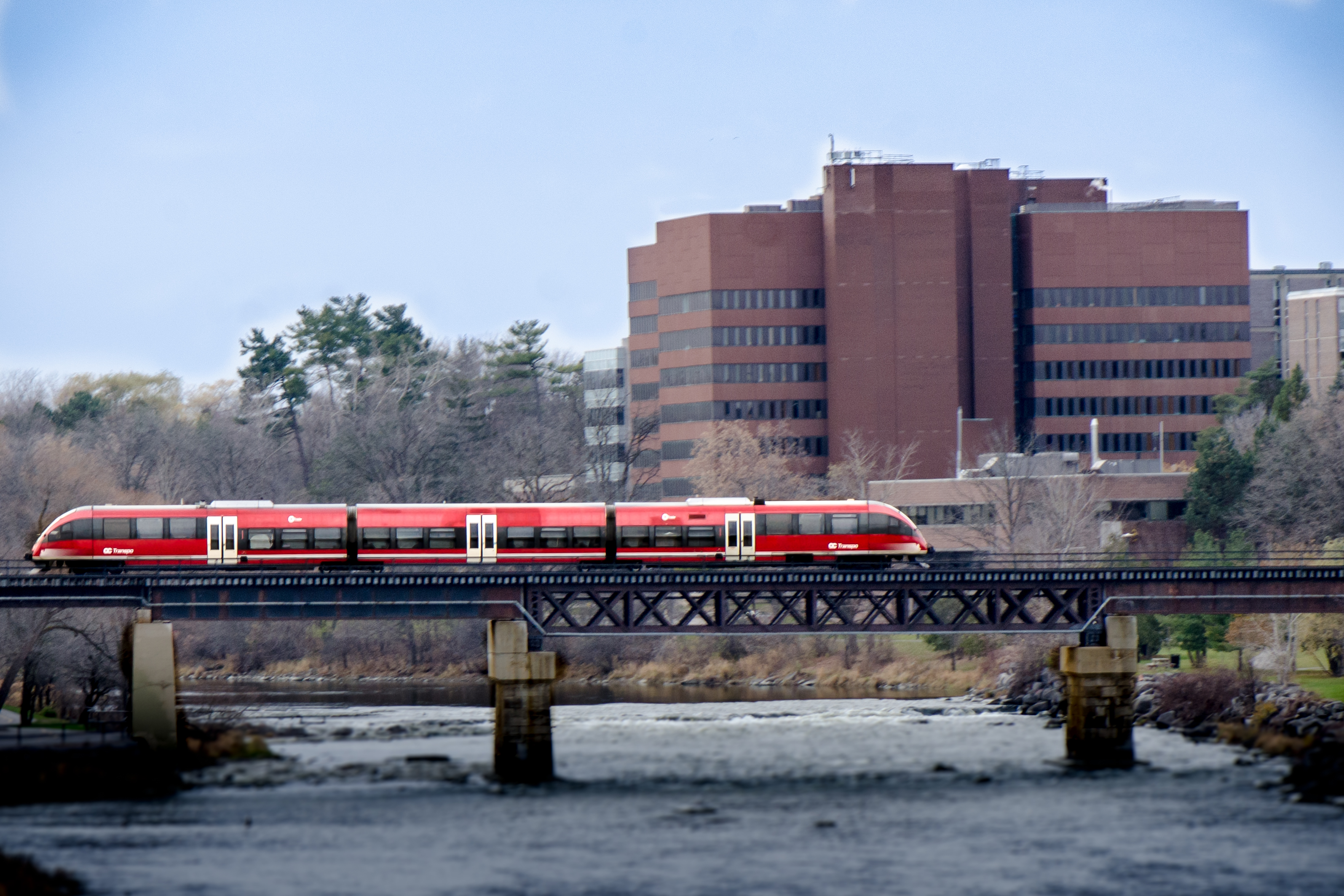
An O-Train crossing the Rideau River. The O-Train is a light rail public transportation service provided by OC Transpo.

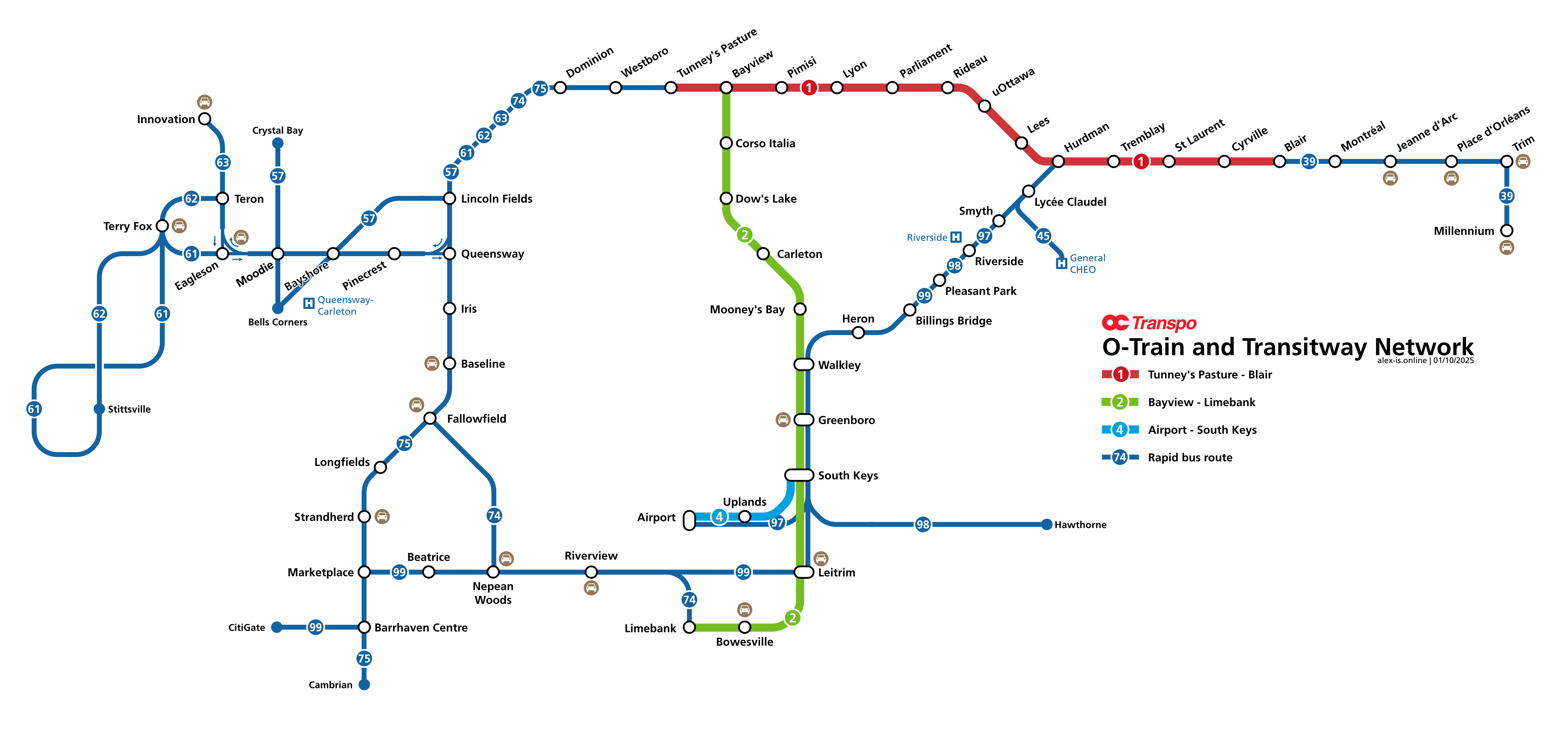
Map of Ottawa's rapid transit network.

Ottawa's public transit system is managed by OC Transpo. OC Transpo operates an integrated, multi-modal rapid transit system which includes:

- The O-Train light rail system. The four-line public rail system includes three existing lines and one currently under construction.
  - Line 1 is an east–west line which operates medium-capacity light rail vehicles and travels under the city's downtown core.
  - Line 2 is a north–south rail transit corridor which utilizes a mix of Stadler FLIRTs and Alstom Coradia LINTs connecting the south end of Ottawa to Line 1 at Bayview station.
  - Line 3 is an under construction branch of Line 1, splitting at Lincoln Fields station and continuing west.
  - Line 4 is a 4 km (2.5 mi) airport link connecting Line 2 to the Ottawa Macdonald–Cartier International Airport
- A bus rapid transit (BRT) system that uses a series of dedicated bus-only roadways named the Transitway and reserved lanes on city streets and highways. The Transitway has long distances between stops and substantial station amenities (including platforms, walkways, fare gates, ticket booths, elevators and convenience stores). It connects Ottawa's suburbs to the inner city. The rapid bus service network operates all day, seven days a week, reaching the suburban communities of Kanata to the West, Barrhaven to the South-West, Orléans to the East, and South Keys to the South. Sections of the transitway have been replaced by O-Train services.
- Over 190 local bus routes are served by a fleet of ordinary, articulated and double-decker buses. Both OC Transpo and the Quebec-based Société de transport de l'Outaouais (STO) operate bus transit services between Ottawa and Gatineau. OC Transpo also operates a door-to-door bus service for disabled individuals known as ParaTranspo. There is a hypothetical tramway partnership that proposes linking Ottawa with Gatineau and connecting to the O-Train.

=== Airports ===
The Ottawa Macdonald–Cartier International Airport is the city's principal airport. There are also three other airports providing general aviation services: Gatineau-Ottawa Executive Airport, Ottawa/Carp Airport, and Ottawa/Rockcliffe Airport.

=== Inter-city transportation ===
Ottawa station is the main inter-city train station operated by Via Rail. It is located 4 kilometres (2.5 mi) to the east of downtown in Eastway Gardens (adjacent to O-Train Tremblay station) and serves Via Rail's Corridor Route. The city is also served by inter-city passenger rail service at Fallowfield station in the southwestern suburban community of Barrhaven.

Intercity bus services are currently provided by several carriers at various stops throughout the city, following the closure of the former Ottawa Central Station bus terminal on 1 June 2021. Major carriers include: Megabus, Ontario Northland, Autobus Gatineau, and Orléans Express.

=== Streets and highways ===
The City of Ottawa has over 8,400 km (5,200 mi) lane-kilometres of road and a series of freeways. The primary freeways are the east–west provincial Highway 417 (designated as the Queensway and part of the Trans-Canada Highway), Ottawa-Carleton Highway 174 (formerly Provincial Highway 17), Highway 7, and the north–south provincial Highway 416 (designated as Veterans' Memorial Highway), which connects to other 400-Series highways via the 401. From downtown there are also connections to Autoroute 5 and Autoroute 50, in neighbouring Gatineau.

The city also has several scenic parkways and promenades, such as the Kichi Zibi Mikan (formerly the Macdonald Parkway), Colonel By Drive, Queen Elizabeth Driveway, the Sir George-Étienne Cartier Parkway (formerly the Rockcliffe Parkway), and the Aviation Parkway. The National Capital Commission manages ceremonial routes linking key attractions on both sides of the Ottawa River, including Confederation Boulevard.

=== Cycling and pedestrian network ===
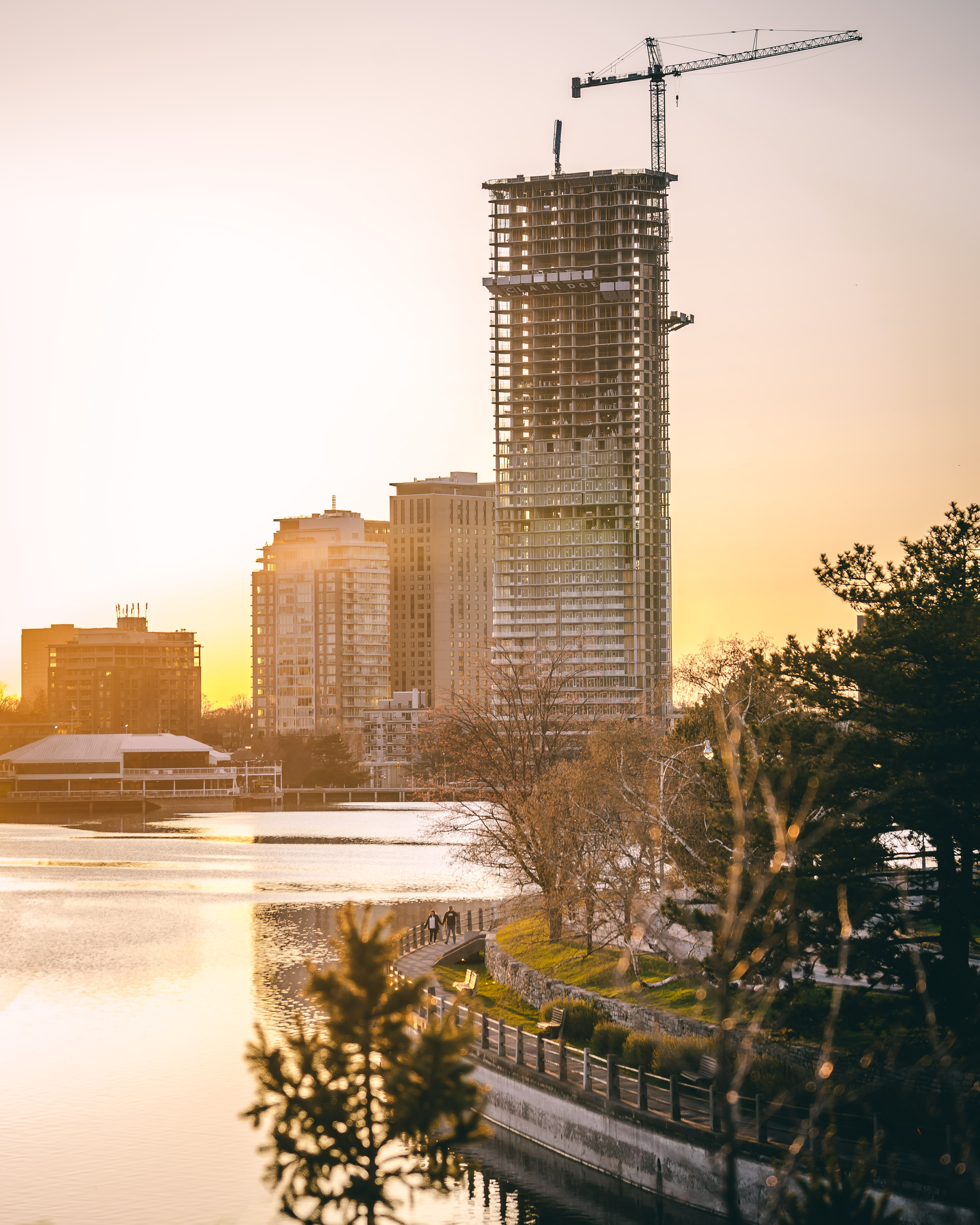
The Capital Pathway is a multi-use trail interlinking sites throughout the National Capital Region.

Numerous paved multi-use trails, mostly operated by the National Capital Commission and the city, wind their way through much of the capital, including along the Ottawa River, Rideau River, and Rideau Canal. These pathways are used for transportation, tourism, and recreation. Because many streets either have wide curb lanes or bicycle lanes, cycling is a mode of transportation used by up to 3.7% of citizens, including in winter. This is the largest percentage of any major Canadian city. As of 31 December 2015, over 900 km (560 mi) of cycling facilities are found in Ottawa, including 435 km (270 mi) of multi-use pathways, 8 km (5.0 mi) of cycle tracks, 200 km (120 mi) of on-road bicycle lanes, and 257 km (160 mi) of paved shoulders. 204 km (127 mi) of new cycling facilities were added between 2011 and 2014.

The entire length of Sparks Street was turned into a pedestrian mall in 1966. Since 1960, additional avenues, streets, and parkways, are reserved for pedestrian and bicycle use only on Saturdays, Sundays and on selected holidays and events. In 2021 city council unanimously approved the Byward Market Public Realm Plan to make the market area more car-free and pedestrian friendly. From 2009 to 2015 the NCC introduced the Capital Bixi bicycle-sharing system. This continued until the company VeloGo took over the program from 2015 to 2018 when the partnership ceased. Scooter-sharing systems were introduced in the downtown and inner-city areas in 2025.

== Sister cities ==
- Beijing, China
- Catania, Italy
- Hanoi, Vietnam
- Huế, Vietnam

== See also ==
- Outline of Ottawa
- List of people from Ottawa

== Bibliography ==
- Brault, Lucien (1946). Ottawa Old and New. Ottawa Historical Information Institute. OCLC 2947504.
- Gordon, David L.A. (2015). Town and Crown an illustrated history of Canada's capital. University of Ottawa Press. ISBN 978-0-470-68158-9. Alt URL
- Hale, James (2011). Frommer's Ottawa. John Wiley and Sons. ISBN 978-0-470-68158-9. Archived from the original on 18 May 2016.
- Keshen, Jeff; St-Onge, Nicole (2001). Ottawa—making a capital. University of Ottawa Press. ISBN 978-0-7766-0521-0. Archived from the original on 24 April 2016.
- Lee, David (2006). Lumber kings & shantymen: logging and lumbering in the Ottawa Valley. James Lorimer & Company. ISBN 978-1-55028-922-0. Archived from the original on 12 May 2016.
- Legget, Robert (1986). Rideau Waterway. University of Toronto Press. ISBN 0-8020-6591-0. Archived from the original on 14 May 2016.
- Martin, Carol (1997). Ottawa: a colourguide. Formac Publishing Company. ISBN 978-0-88780-396-3. Archived from the original on 6 May 2016.
- Mika, Nick; Mika, Helma (1982). Bytown: The Early Days of Ottawa. Mika Publishing Company. ISBN 0-919303-60-9.
- Taylor, John H. (1986). Ottawa: An Illustrated History. J. Lorimer. ISBN 978-0-88862-981-4.
- Van de Wetering, Marion (1997). An Ottawa album: glimpses of the way we were. Dundurn Press Ltd. ISBN 978-0-88882-195-9. Archived from the original on 12 May 2016.
- Woods, Shirley E. Jr. (1980). Ottawa: The Capital of Canada. Doubleday Canada. ISBN 0-385-14722-8.
