= Flag of Ottawa =

Canadian municipal flag

Ottawa
- Proportion: 1∶2
- Adopted: 24 January 2001
- Design: Blue and green colours separated by a stylized O

The flag of Ottawa is blue on the left and green on the right with a stylized white "O" design in the middle. It was adopted following the amalgamation of municipalities in the Regional Municipality of Ottawa–Carleton into Ottawa in 2001. The blue symbolizes the waterways of the region, and the green represents its green spaces. The "O" represents "the vibrancy and forward movement of the new City." The meeting of the bands at a common point symbolizes unity towards a common goal. The shape of the bands of the "O" abstractly hints at the maple leaf, which is a national symbol of Canada, and the Canadian Parliament Buildings, which are located in Ottawa.

== History ==
=== The former tricolour ===
Previously the Ottawa flag had been a purple, red and blue tricolour. This flag was adopted by the city in 1901, and when it was replaced it was the oldest municipal flag in Canada. The three colours were intended to represent purple for the monarchy, red for the Liberals, and blue for the Conservatives. In 1987, the city's coat of arms was added to the centre.

Flag of Ottawa, 1902–1987

Flag of Ottawa, 1987–2000

=== The current flag ===
The municipalities of the Regional Municipality of Ottawa–Carleton were merged into Ottawa in 2001, and a new flag was developed in the process.

The governing body in charge was Visual Identity Advisory Committee of the Ottawa Transition Board, which worked with the Canadian Heraldic Authority. The public was consulted during the development process, while a commercial design firm created the concept. The firm also developed a coat of arms which was not adopted, and instead the coat of arms was retained from the pre-merger city of Ottawa. The Ottawa Transition Board approved the new flag on 23 October 2000, and the City Council of Ottawa formally adopted the flag on 24 January 2001, on which date the flag was officially flown for the first time.
