= 2026 York Region municipal elections =

Elections in municipality of Canadian province

2026 York Region municipal election
- October 26, 2026
Incumbent Council
(2022)

Elections in the Regional Municipality of York of Ontario, Canada will be held on October 26, 2026, in conjunction with municipal elections across the province.

Incumbents are marked with "(X)".

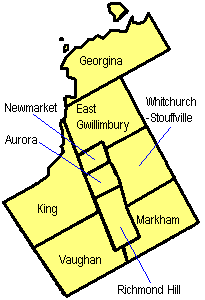
Map of York Region and the municipalities it includes.

== York Regional Council ==
| Position | Representing | Councillor | Notes |
|---|---|---|---|
| Chair | | | Chairman and CEO |
| Councillor | Aurora | Tom Mrakas | Mayor of Aurora |
| Councillor | East Gwillimbury | Scott Crone | Mayor of East Gwillimbury |
| Councillor | Georgina | Dale Kerr Genge | Mayor of Georgina |
| Councillor | Georgina | Naomi Davison | Regional Councillor |
| Councillor | King | Steve Pellegrini | Mayor of King |
| Councillor | Markham | Frank Scarpitti | Mayor of Markham |
| Councillor | Markham | Jack Heath | Regional Councillor |
| Councillor | Markham | Don Hamilton | Regional Councillor |
| Councillor | Markham | Amanda Yeung Collucci | Regional Councillor |
| Councillor | Markham | Jim Jones | Regional Councillor |
| Councillor | Newmarket | John Taylor (acclaimed) | Mayor of Newmarket |
| Councillor | Newmarket | Tom Vegh | Regional Councillor |
| Councillor | Richmond Hill | David West | Mayor of Richmond Hill |
| Councillor | Richmond Hill | Joe DiPaola | Regional Councillor |
| Councillor | Richmond Hill | Godwin Chan | Regional Councillor |
| Councillor | Vaughan | Steven Del Duca | Mayor of Vaughan |
| Councillor | Vaughan | Gino Rosati | Regional Councillor |
| Councillor | Vaughan | Mario Ferri | Regional Councillor |
| Councillor | Vaughan | Linda D. Jackson | Regional Councillor |
| Councillor | Vaughan | Mario G. Racco | Regional Councillor |
| Councillor | Whitchurch–Stouffville | Iain Lovatt | Mayor of Whitchurch–Stouffville |

== Regional chair ==
Following the passage of the "Better Regional Governance Act", the provincial government will appoint the chair of the Region. The incumbent chair is Eric Jolliffe, the former chief of the York Regional Police. He was appointed by the provincial government in January 2025.

== Aurora ==
List of candidates:

=== Mayor ===
Mayor Tom Mrakas was challenged by Ward 5 councillor John Gallo.

| Mayoral candidate | Vote | % |
|---|---|---|
| Tom Mrakas (X) | 8,526 | 54.37 |
| John Gallo | 4,991 | 31.83 |
| Shawn Deane | 1,521 | 9.70 |
| Yafang Shi | 643 | 4.10 |

=== Aurora Town Council ===
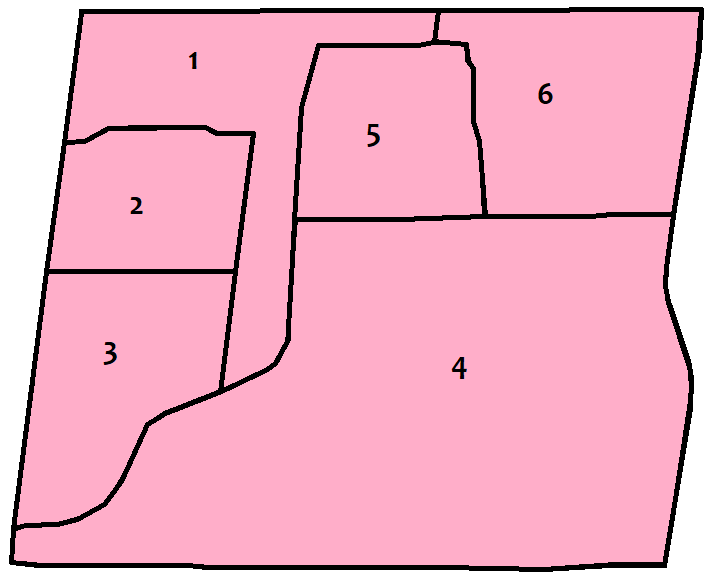
Map of Aurora's six wards

==== Ward 1 ====
| Candidate | Vote | % |
|---|---|---|
| Lauren Hanna | 1,899 | 61.06 |
| Rocco Morsillo | 1,211 | 38.94 |

==== Ward 2 ====
Current incumbent is Rachel Gilliland.

| Candidate | Vote | % |
|---|---|---|
| Angela Daust | 959 | 37.88 |
| Marco Di Girolamo | 733 | 28.95 |
| Phiona Durrant | 556 | 21.96 |
| Brynn Lansdown | 284 | 11.22 |

==== Ward 3 ====
| Candidate | Vote | % |
|---|---|---|
| Nikki Alber | 1,632 | 48.14 |
| Harold MacDonald | 609 | 17.96 |
| Alexandra Bonham | 576 | 16.99 |
| Robert James Fraser | 531 | 15.66 |
| Reza Vaez Ghamsary | 42 | 1.24 |

==== Ward 4 ====
| Candidate | Vote | % |
|---|---|---|
| Michael Thompson (X) | 1,370 | 77.49 |
| Shaheen Moledina | 398 | 22.51 |

==== Ward 5 ====
| Candidate | Vote | % |
|---|---|---|
| Jessie Fraser | 1,065 | 37.61 |
| Milton Hart | 574 | 20.27 |
| Terrence Zhu | 432 | 15.25 |
| Charity Dela Cruz-Toupin | 376 | 13.28 |
| George Tremtsidis | 288 | 10.17 |
| Harbinder (Binda) Thandi | 97 | 3.43 |

==== Ward 6 ====
| Candidate | Vote | % |
|---|---|---|
| Harold Kim (X) | 1,154 | 63.93 |
| Zivka Kicic | 519 | 28.75 |
| Nicholas Kashef | 110 | 6.09 |
| Jibraan Khan | 22 | 1.22 |

== East Gwillimbury ==
=== Mayor ===
Mayor Virginia Hackson is retiring, and did not stand for re-election this year. Running for mayor were Ward 3 councillor Scott Crone and Ward 2 councillor Brian Johns.

List of candidates:

| Mayoral candidate | Vote | % |
|---|---|---|
| Scott Crone | 5,390 | 53.4 |
| Brian Johns | 4,709 | 46.6 |

Preliminary results:

== Georgina ==
List of candidates:

=== Mayor ===
Mayor Margaret Quirk announced she was running for re-election in May. Ward 4 councillor Dale Genge ran against her.

| Mayoral candidate | Vote | % |
|---|---|---|
| Dale Kerr Genge | 7,127 | 54.79 |
| Margaret Quirk (X) | 4,622 | 35.53 |
| Frank Sebo | 1,258 | 9.67 |

=== Georgina Town Council ===
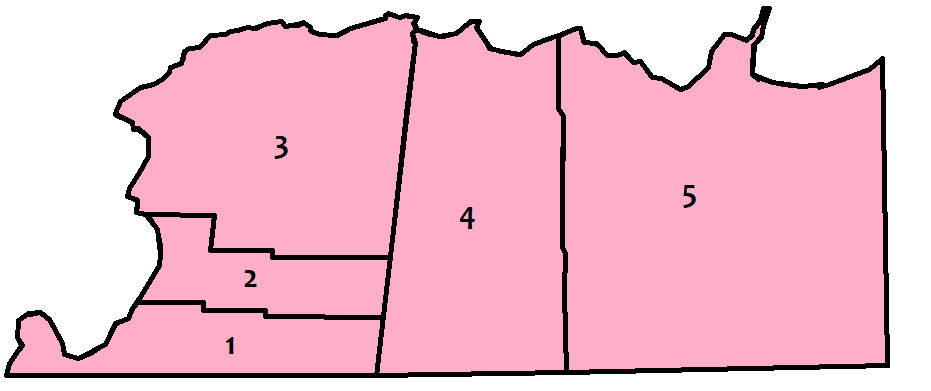
Map of Georgina's 5 wards

==== Regional Councillor ====
| Council candidate | Vote | % |
|---|---|---|
| Naomi Davison (X) | 6,705 | 52.75 |
| Geoff Fardy | 6,006 | 47.25 |

==== Ward 1 ====
| Council candidate | Vote | % |
|---|---|---|
| Charlene Biggerstaff (X) | 1,387 | 64.72 |
| Duncan MacCallum | 756 | 35.28 |

==== Ward 2 ====
| Council candidate | Vote | % |
|---|---|---|
| Mike Gurr | 1,480 | 46.79 |
| Natalie Floyd | 857 | 27.09 |
| Dan Fellini (X) | 458 | 14.48 |
| Stephen Faudemer | 368 | 11.63 |

==== Ward 3 ====
| Council candidate | Vote | % |
|---|---|---|
| Andrew Edge | 1,325 | 46.70 |
| Dave Neeson (X) | 788 | 27.78 |
| Danielle Cohen | 560 | 19.74 |
| Nicholas Watts | 89 | 3.14 |
| Billy Hadden | 75 | 2.64 |

==== Ward 4 ====
| Council candidate | Vote | % |
|---|---|---|
| Mike Anderson | 1,528 | 50.92 |
| Casey Sellers | 911 | 30.36 |
| Ivy Henriksen | 354 | 11.80 |
| Greta Zinck | 208 | 6.93 |

==== Ward 5 ====
| Council candidate | Vote | % |
|---|---|---|
| Karen Wolfe | 1,250 | 70.54 |
| Lee Dale (X) | 522 | 29.46 |

== King ==
=== Mayor ===
Mayor Steve Pellegrini is running for re-election.

List of candidates:

| Mayoral candidate | Vote | % |
|---|---|---|
| Steve Pellegrini (X) | | |
| Stephen Ferritto | | |

== Markham ==
List of candidates:

=== Mayor ===
2026 Markham Mayoral election
- October 26, 2026
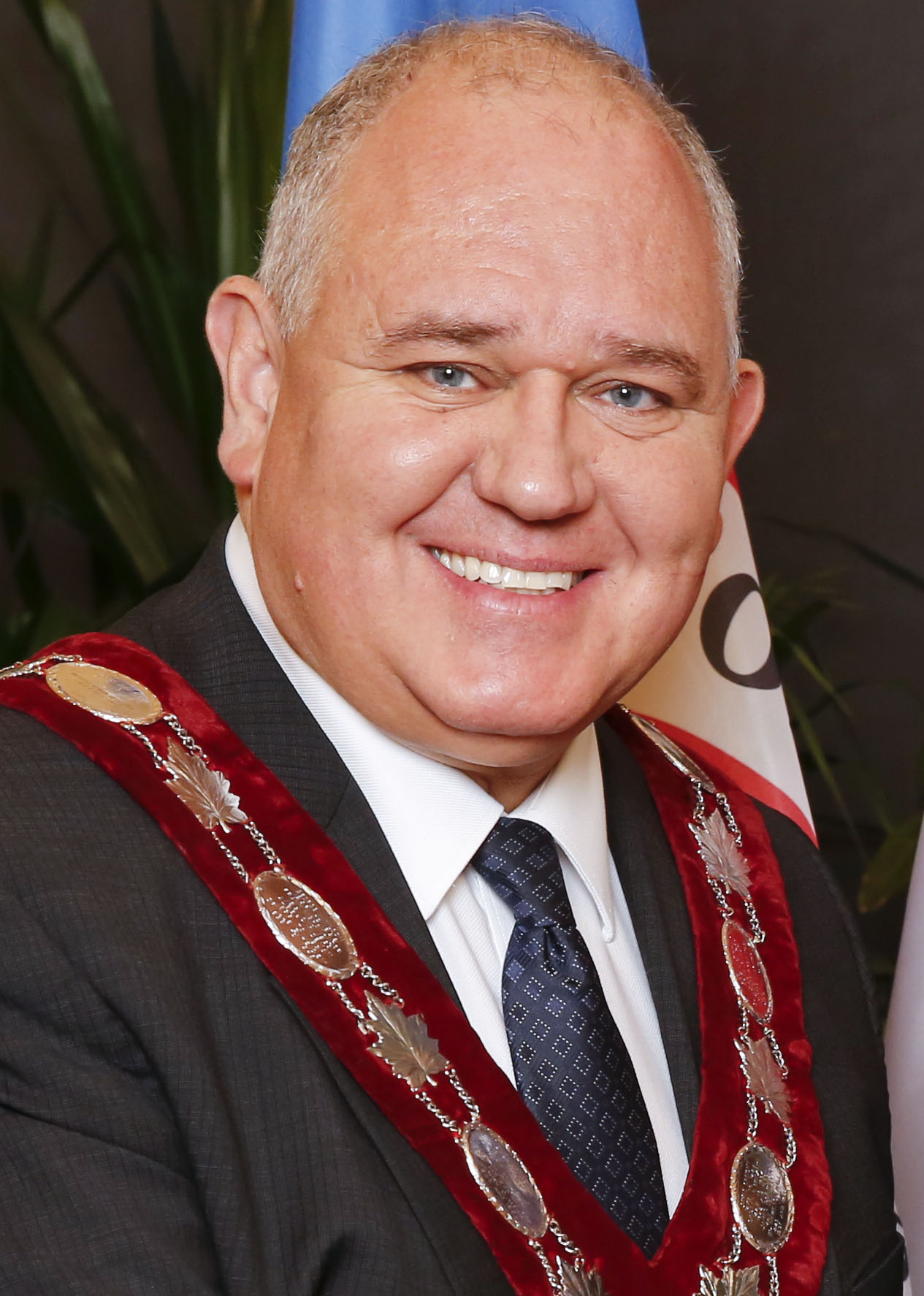
| | | MR | SE |
| Candidate | Frank Scarpitti | Martin Ross | Stephen Edgell |
| Popular vote | 58,260 | 13,152 | 9,658 |
| Percentage | 71.86% | 16.22% | 11.91% |
Mayor before election
Frank Scarpitti
Elected mayor
Frank Scarpitti

Mayor Frank Scarpitti ran for re-election. He was challenged by Martin Ross, who gained notoriety for opposing the city's efforts to shut down an outdoor rink he constructed in his backyard.

| Mayoral candidate | Vote | % |
|---|---|---|
| Frank Scarpitti (X) | 58,260 | 71.86 |
| Martin Ross | 13,152 | 16.22 |
| Stephen Edgell | 9,658 | 11.91 |

=== City Council ===
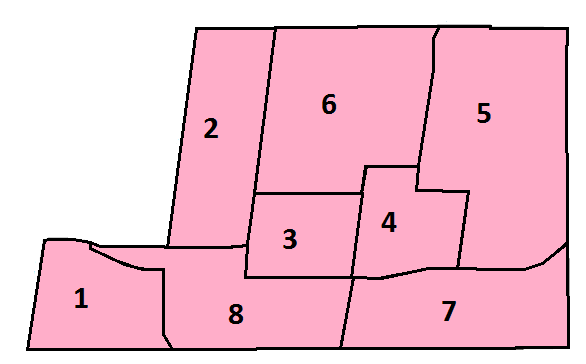
Map of Markham's 8 wards

==== Regional Councillor ====
In Markham, Regional Councillors serve on both the City Council as well as York Region Council. Electors can vote for up to four candidates on their ballots, equal to the total number that may be elected. The four winning candidates are those who receive the highest number of votes. The candidate with the highest number of votes received also serves as Deputy Mayor.

Changes for this election are the departure of Deputy Mayor Michael Chan and returning former Deputy Mayor and Regional Councillor Jack Heath.

| Council candidate | Vote | % |
|---|---|---|
| Don Hamilton | 36,701 | 13.95 |
| Jack Heath | 32,011 | 12.16 |
| Jim Jones (X) | 31,658 | 12.03 |
| Amanda Yeung Collucci | 31,004 | 11.78 |
| Alan Ho (X) | 29,837 | 11.34 |
| Joe Li (X) | 28,542 | 10.85 |
| Paul Chiang | 21,856 | 8.31 |
| Ivy Lee | 17,381 | 6.61 |
| Joe Tay | 16,733 | 6.36 |
| Michael Huang | 10,664 | 4.05 |
| Richard Tranquada | 6,756 | 2.57 |

==== Ward 1 ====
| Council candidate | Vote | % |
|---|---|---|
| Keith Irish (X) | 6,483 | 68.62 |
| Christina Cadorin | 2,965 | 31.38 |

==== Ward 2 ====
| Council candidate | Vote | % |
|---|---|---|
| Ritch Lau (X) | 6,309 | 73.19 |
| Mark Lin | 1,062 | 12.32 |
| Richard Lee | 879 | 10.20 |
| Haohui Yu | 370 | 4.29 |

==== Ward 3 ====
| Council candidate | Vote | % |
|---|---|---|
| Marina Antonoglou | 3,572 | 37.38 |
| Ron Lynn | 1,738 | 17.19 |
| Jack Ng | 1,429 | 14.95 |
| Thomas Psarianos | 1,308 | 13.69 |
| Annie Chan | 946 | 9.90 |
| Kristian Chan | 564 | 5.90 |

==== Ward 4 ====
| Council candidate | Vote | % |
|---|---|---|
| Karen Rea (X) | 9,615 | 91.73 |
| Vid Sansanwal | 867 | 8.27 |

==== Ward 5 ====
| Council candidate | Vote | % |
|---|---|---|
| Andrew Keyes (X) | 4,494 | 46.08 |
| Laurence Liang | 3,212 | 32.93 |
| Thamiraa Ragikaran | 2,047 | 20.99 |

==== Ward 6 ====
| Council candidate | Vote | % |
|---|---|---|
| Kenneth Li | 2,784 | 32.68 |
| Joanna Yu | 2,682 | 31.48 |
| Scott Xie | 1,250 | 14.67 |
| Patrick Yeung | 643 | 7.55 |
| Jude Ahiaegbe | 530 | 6.22 |
| Hanson Shen | 319 | 3.74 |
| Larry Lau | 311 | 3.65 |

==== Ward 7 ====
| Council candidate | Vote | % |
|---|---|---|
| Nimisha Patel (X) | 7,044 | 48.63 |
| Killi Chelliah | 5,324 | 36.76 |
| Stanley Sam | 1,149 | 7.93 |
| Sameer Qureshi | 967 | 6.68 |

==== Ward 8 ====
| Council candidate | Vote | % |
|---|---|---|
| Isa Lee (X) | 6,724 | 72.02 |
| Jenny Chen | 2,612 | 27.98 |

== Newmarket ==
List of candidates:

=== Mayor ===
Mayor John Taylor has confirmed he will be running for re-election. He was elected by acclamation.

| Mayoral candidate | Vote | % |
|---|---|---|
| John Taylor (X) | Acclaimed | |

=== Newmarket Town Council ===
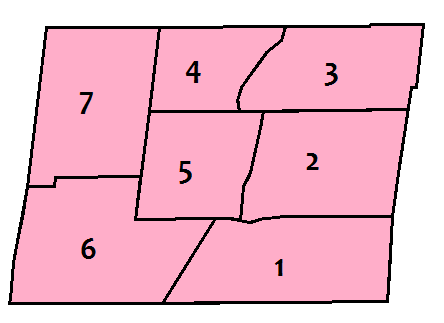
Map of Newmarket's seven wards

==== Deputy mayor and regional councillor ====
| Candidate | Vote | % |
|---|---|---|
| Tom Vegh (X) | 13,907 | 68.71 |
| Mohsen Alavi | 6,334 | 31.29 |

==== Ward 1 ====
| Council candidate | Vote | % |
|---|---|---|
| Sonia Fiorini | 1,423 | 41.31 |
| Naqi Ahsan | 876 | 25.43 |
| Chintan Dudakiya | 556 | 16.14 |
| Nasim Bahari | 426 | 12.37 |
| Nisa Chaudhry | 164 | 4.76 |

==== Ward 2 ====
| Council candidate | Vote | % |
|---|---|---|
| Glenn Marais | 933 | 34.80 |
| Brian Andrews | 894 | 33.35 |
| Pamela McCarthy | 854 | 31.85 |

==== Ward 3 ====
| Council candidate | Vote | % |
|---|---|---|
| Jane Twinney (X) | 1,412 | 61.50 |
| Andrey Zavidovskiy | 683 | 29.75 |
| Christine Spicer | 201 | 8.75 |

==== Ward 4 ====
| Council candidate | Vote | % |
|---|---|---|
| Trevor Morrison (X) | 1,725 | 61.63 |
| Krissy Young | 701 | 25.04 |
| Jairan Jahani | 273 | 9.75 |
| Alireza Izadjoo | 100 | 3.57 |

==== Ward 5 ====
| Council candidate | Vote | % |
|---|---|---|
| Bob Kwapis (X) | Acclaimed | |

==== Ward 6 ====
| Council candidate | Vote | % |
|---|---|---|
| Kelly Broome (X) | 2,670 | 69.55 |
| Sam Mortazavi | 1,169 | 30.45 |

==== Ward 7 ====
| Council candidate | Vote | % |
|---|---|---|
| Christina Bisanz (X) | Acclaimed | |

== Richmond Hill ==
List of candidates:

=== Mayor ===
2026 Richmond Hill mayoral election
- October 26, 2026
- Turnout: 27.98%
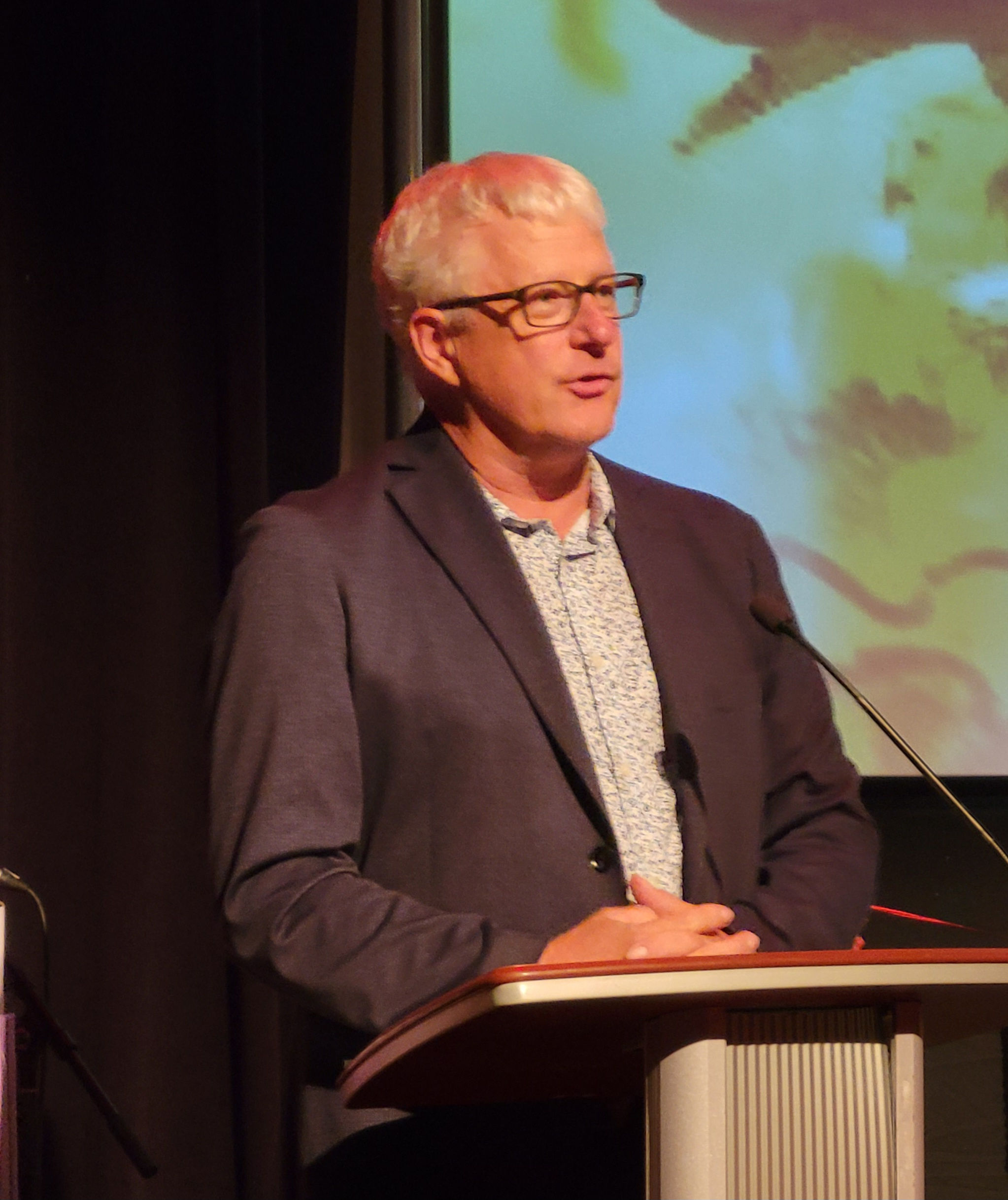
| | | DB |
| Nominee | David West | Domenic Bardari |
| Popular vote | 36,205 | 5,758 |
| Percentage | 83.55% | 13.29% |
Mayor before election
David West
Elected mayor
David West

Mayor David West signed up to run for mayor on May 1.

| Mayoral candidate | Vote | % |
|---|---|---|
| David West (X) | 36,205 | 83.55 |
| Domenic Bardari | 5,758 | 13.29 |
| Holo Devnani | 1,371 | 3.16 |

=== Richmond Hill City Council ===
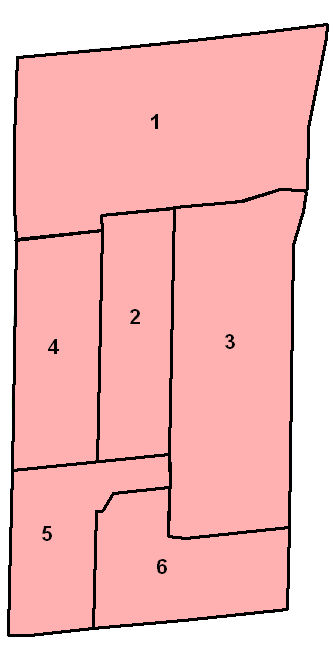
Map of Richmond Hill's six wards

==== Regional council ====
Two to be elected.

| Council candidate | Vote | % |
|---|---|---|
| Godwin Chan (X) | 29,674 | 42.82 |
| Joe DiPaola (X) | 26,924 | 38.85 |
| Marco Coletta | 12,699 | 18.33 |

==== Ward 1 ====
| Council candidate | Vote | % |
|---|---|---|
| Carol Davidson (X) | 3,696 | 44.20 |
| Catherine Dell'Erba | 2,748 | 32.86 |
| Giovanni Nardone | 1,716 | 20.52 |
| Raymond Dodaro | 202 | 2.42 |

==== Ward 2 ====
| Council candidate | Vote | % |
|---|---|---|
| Scott Thompson | 1,921 | 35.17 |
| Tom Muench | 1,403 | 25.69 |
| Muhammad Kermalli | 1,020 | 18.67 |
| Sigmund Lee | 949 | 17.37 |
| Hamidreza Kheirkhah Ghehi | 169 | 3.09 |

==== Ward 3 ====
| Council candidate | Vote | % |
|---|---|---|
| Castro Liu | 5,741 | 85.67 |
| Juni Yeung | 960 | 14.33 |

==== Ward 4 ====
| Council candidate | Vote | % |
|---|---|---|
| Simon Cui (X) | 2,949 | 33.44 |
| Danny Yoon | 2,600 | 29.49 |
| Rose Weinberg | 2,433 | 27.59 |
| Sharon Chisholm | 562 | 6.37 |
| Ahmad Amanullah | 274 | 3.11 |

==== Ward 5 ====
| Council candidate | Vote | % |
|---|---|---|
| Karen Cilevitz (X) | 2,106 | 29.95 |
| Richard Rupp | 1,496 | 21.28 |
| Yuliya Benedziktavich | 1,118 | 15.90 |
| Marty Paulin | 776 | 11.04 |
| Ray Behroozian | 590 | 8.39 |
| Vera Murano | 514 | 7.31 |
| Alex Jafari | 279 | 3.97 |
| Ali Mahboub-Shadkhou | 152 | 2.16 |

==== Ward 6 ====
| Council candidate | Vote | % |
|---|---|---|
| Michael Shiu (X) | 5,237 | 72.68 |
| Andrew Mendonca | 1,271 | 17.64 |
| Hasti Anasory | 698 | 9.69 |

== Vaughan ==
List of candidates:

=== Mayor ===
2026 Vaughan Mayoral election
- October 26, 2026
- Turnout: 26.8%
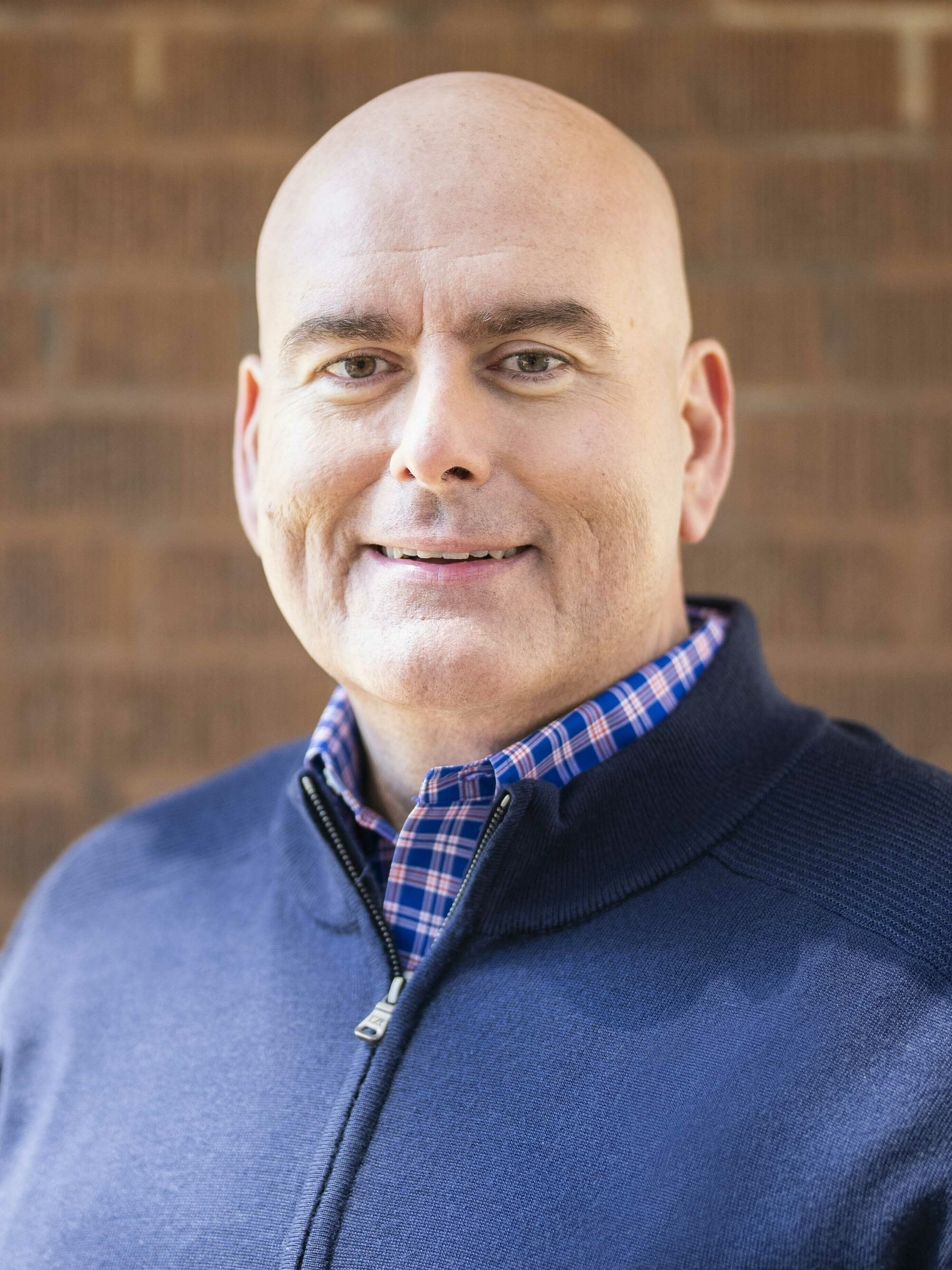
| | | SC |
| Candidate | Steven Del Duca | Shelly Cerrelli |
| Popular vote | 57,221 | 12,951 |
| Percentage | 81.54% | 18.46% |
Mayor before election
Steven Del Duca
Elected mayor
Steven Del Duca

Mayor Steven Del Duca announced his intentions to run for re-election on May 1. He was endorsed by Progressive Conservative MPP Stephen Lecce and Conservative MPs Melissa Lantsman, Anna Roberts, and Michael Guglielmin.

| Mayoral candidate | Vote | % |
|---|---|---|
| Steven Del Duca (X) | 57,221 | 81.54 |
| Shelly-Ann Starlette Cerrelli | 12,951 | 18.46 |

=== Vaughan City Council ===
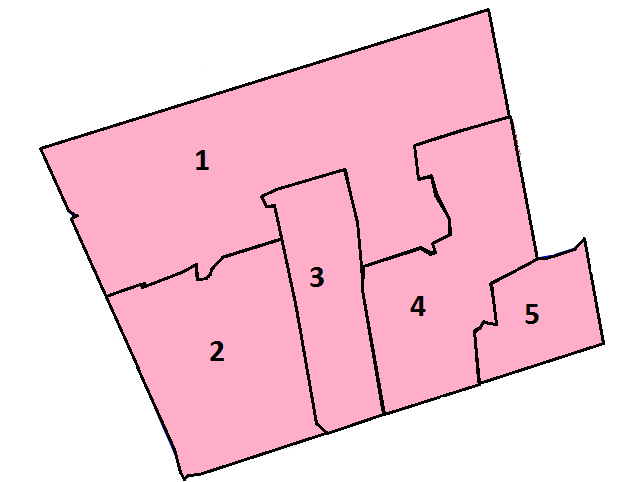
Map of Vaughan's five wards

==== Regional council ====
Four to be elected.

| Council candidate | Vote | % |
|---|---|---|
| Linda D. Jackson (X) | 34,763 | 17.54 |
| Mario Ferri (X) | 32,901 | 16.60 |
| Gino Rosati (X) | 32,638 | 16.46 |
| Mario G. Racco (X) | 29,888 | 15.08 |
| Mario Di Nardo | 18,517 | 9.34 |
| Alex Nascimben | 13,758 | 6.94 |
| Mandy Rai | 11,760 | 5.93 |
| Fitz-Roy Gordon | 9,104 | 4.59 |
| Bob Santos | 8,490 | 4.28 |
| Alireza Siadatan | 6,426 | 3.24 |

==== Ward 1 ====
| Council candidate | Vote | % |
|---|---|---|
| Marilyn Iafrate (X) | 6,607 | 40.06 |
| Angela Saggese | 5,445 | 33.02 |
| Nadeem Mahmood | 2,589 | 15.70 |
| Vince Scaramuzzo | 1,851 | 11.22 |

==== Ward 2 ====
| Council candidate | Vote | % |
|---|---|---|
| Adriano Volpentesta (X) | 9,939 | 79.03 |
| Anna DeBartolo | 1,675 | 13.32 |
| Pedro Benevides | 963 | 7.66 |

==== Ward 3 ====
| Council candidate | Vote | % |
|---|---|---|
| Rosanna DeFrancesca (X) | 11,267 | 86.61 |
| Asadullah Aminpur | 1,742 | 13.39 |

==== Ward 4 ====
| Council candidate | Vote | % |
|---|---|---|
| Chris Ainsworth (X) | 9,431 | 83.91 |
| Deven Sandhu | 948 | 8.43 |
| Nirmala Ramlall | 502 | 4.47 |
| Karim Aziz | 359 | 3.19 |

==== Ward 5 ====
| Council candidate | Vote | % |
|---|---|---|
| Gila Martow (X) | Acclaimed | |

== Whitchurch-Stouffville ==
List of candidates:

=== Mayor ===
Mayor Iain Lovatt formally announced he was running for re-election on May 21.

| Mayoral candidate | Vote | % |
|---|---|---|
| Iain Lovatt (X) | Acclaimed | |

=== Whitchurch-Stouffville Town Council ===
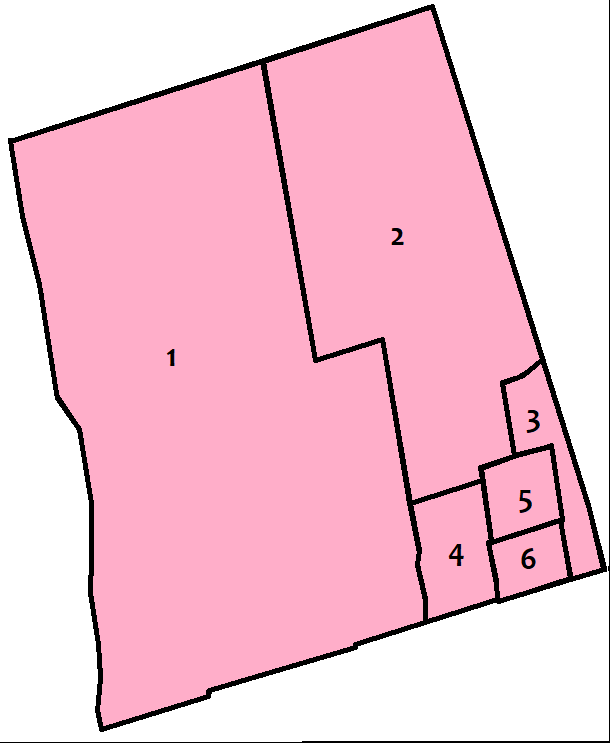
Map of Whitchurch-Stouffville's six wards

==== Ward 1 ====
| Council candidate | Vote | % |
|---|---|---|
| Hugo Kroon (X) | 741 | 55.34 |
| Michael Cleverdon | 598 | 44.66 |

==== Ward 2 ====
| Council candidate | Vote | % |
|---|---|---|
| Jared Simpson | 932 | 30.95 |
| George Karpouzis | 684 | 22.72 |
| Adam Hassan | 600 | 19.93 |
| Terri Drover | 573 | 19.03 |
| Rocco Priore | 222 | 7.37 |

==== Ward 3 ====
| Council candidate | Vote | % |
|---|---|---|
| Bryan Stott | 749 | 38.79 |
| Keith Acton (X) | 704 | 36.46 |
| Roger Gingerich | 478 | 24.75 |

==== Ward 4 ====
| Council candidate | Vote | % |
|---|---|---|
| Erik Gordon | 852 | 26.14 |
| Courtney Taylor | 722 | 22.15 |
| David Parmer | 577 | 1.70 |
| Rick Upton (X) | 487 | 14.94 |
| Rob Hargrave | 348 | 10.68 |
| Brad Valentini | 146 | 4.48 |
| James Liaros | 127 | 3.90 |

==== Ward 5 ====
| Council candidate | Vote | % |
|---|---|---|
| Richard Bartley (X) | 1,106 | 50.50 |
| Laura Cusack | 971 | 44.34 |
| Shawn McGovern | 113 | 5.16 |

==== Ward 6 ====
| Council candidate | Vote | % |
|---|---|---|
| Sue Sherban | 1,985 | 68.45 |
| Angel Freedman | 627 | 21.62 |
| Greg Smith | 288 | 9.93 |
