= Municipal elections in Richmond Hill, Ontario =

Municipal elections in Richmond Hill, Ontario are held every four years, concurrent with other municipal elections in Ontario. Historically, elections were held more often. Elected positions include mayor, regional and local councillor and ward councillors (for six different wards) on the Richmond Hill City Council, as well as trustees for the York Region District School Board, the York Catholic District School Board and for a Conseillere for the Conseil Scholare de District de Centre SudOuest.

== 1873 election ==
The first election in Richmond Hill was held January 6, 1873, just after its incorporation as a village. The campaign focused on the need to build a new high school as the one built in the 1850s was becoming crowded.

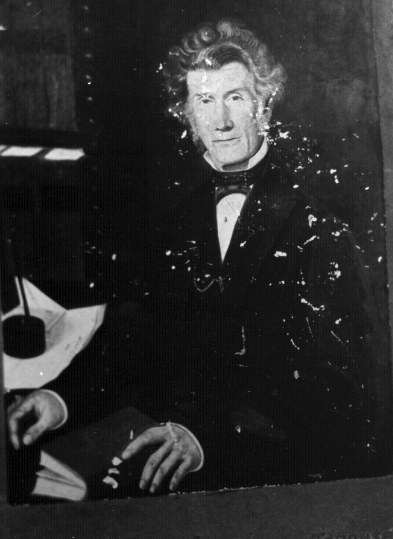
Abraham Law, elected the first reeve of Richmond Hill

The vote tallies were (elected candidates bolded):

Reeve	Votes	Councillors	Votes
**Abraham Law**	**56**	**William Warren**	**98**
Andrew McNair	47	**Jacob Brillinger**	**83**
Dr. John Duncumb	5	**William Powell**	**77**
		**David Hopkins**	**62**
		James Freek	58
		J.R. Arnold	42

== 1985 election ==
Concurrent with the 1985 election, two plebiscites were held, one relating to the ward system and one relating to Nuclear-free zones. Voters rejected the new ward system 5057 to 5460 and endorsed the nuclear-free zone declaration 7073 to 3272. Low voter turnout was credited to the poor weather and the lack of a mayoral race.

Mayor	Votes	Local and Regional Councillor	Votes	Ward 1	Votes	Ward 2	Votes	Ward 3	Votes	Ward 4	Votes	Ward 5	Votes	Ward 6	Votes
**Al Duffy**	Accl.	**Gordon Rowe**	4890	**Tom Simpson**	681	**Doug Smith**	1455	**William F. Bell**	1042	**Gail Blackburn**	1345	**Bob Case**	1108	**Bryon Wilfert**	810
		**Lois Hancey**	6232	Bill Corcoran	3468	Frank Gallant	1058	Terence Munsey	128	Paul Hunter	585	Bernie Gaten	755	Nick Papa	333
		David Amos	2814	Larry Ashton	207	James Justin Hogan	106			Gerry O'Donnell	313			Frank Cavallo	381
		Steven Rotman	747	John Fearon	44									Joe Pacitto	151

== 1988 election ==
The election was held November 14, 1988. Issues in the election included the rapid building of houses in Richmond Hill which many felt had outpaced the growth of corresponding services. The relationship between the town councillors and developers had also been the subject of controversy.

Mayor	Votes	Local and Regional Councillor	Votes	Ward 1	Votes	Ward 2	Votes	Ward 3	Votes	Ward 4	Votes	Ward 5	Votes	Ward 6	Votes
**William F. Bell**	8887	**Frank Endean**	6277	**Tom Simpson**	1737	**Janet Mabley**	1901	**David Cohen**	1456	**Gail Blackburn**	2466	**Catherine Bishop**	1907	**Bryon Wilfert**	1479
Al Duffy	5386	**Lois Hancey**	6002	Bonnie Tiffin	589	Nicholas Legge	802	Bronwyn Frazer	976	Dennis Chris	919	Nick Papa	1636	Rosario DeGregorio	671
Isabelle Gargarella	4811	Linda Christie	5940			David Amos	530	Terence Munsey	433	Nick Negri	322				
		Bill Monroe	4407			Joanne Leroux-Willison	138	Stephen Kaye	350						
		Robert Cage	3749												
		Larry Ashton	1165												

== 1991 election ==
One of the main issue of the 1991 election was plans to scrap the building of a large civic centre in the downtown area, and instead lease office space in Beaver Creek Industrial Park for that purpose, and build a single purpose library downtown instead of integrating it into a multi-purpose facility.

== 2003 election ==
The 2003 election was held on November 12, 2003.

Mayor	Votes	Local and Regional Councillor	Votes	Ward 1	Votes	Ward 2	Votes	Ward 3	Votes	Ward 4	Votes	Ward 5	Votes	Ward 6	Votes
**William F. Bell**	2373			**Vito Spatafora**	2052	**Arnie Warner**	2027	**David Cohen**	1750	**Lynn Foster**	1830	**Elio Di Iorio**	2420	**Joe DiPaola**	1444
William Lazenby	917			Vince Agozzino	2006	Gary Schecter	614	Agnes Chan-Wong	1257	Bruce Gilmour	1121	Nick Papa	2175	Michael Charles Latour	858
Sonny Khan	202			Cathy Leung-Rosnuk	995	Ali Mian	399	Shirley Chan	86	Ted Bunker	850	Lucy Rosina Cunningham	294	Godwin Chan	702
						Joe Pacitto	315			Blair Kingsland	107	Ali Zahedi	43	Jane Robertson	608

== 2006 election ==
The election debates centred on urban sprawl, especially with regards to the Oak Ridges Moraine, waste management and urban renewal in the downtown area of Richmond Hill.

Mayor	Votes	Local and Regional Councillor	Votes	Ward 1	Votes	Ward 2	Votes	Ward 3	Votes	Ward 4	Votes	Ward 5	Votes	Ward 6	Votes
**Dave Barrow**	22007	**Brenda Hogg**	15296	**Greg Beros**	1568	**Arnie Warner**	2128	**David Cohen**	2179	**Lynn Foster**	4046	**Nick Papa**	2509	**Godwin Chan**	1627
David McCann	2661	**Vito Spatafora**	14536	Carrie Hoffelner	1209	Asghar Naqvi	1138	Natalie Helferty	685	Shiraz Hudda	608	Elio di Iorio	2480	Michael Charles Latour	1292
Anastasios Baxevanidis	2276	Joe DiPaola	13916	Don Ciccone	746	Carmine Perrelli	1095	Vik Gandhi	436			Marg Aldridge	609	Sandra di Iorio	1069
Ramon Datol	962			Heather Sinclair	328	Mike McCallum	354	Arif Khan	228			Michael McGouran	552	Derek Wu	614
				Adam Dodwell	78	D.L. Meitz	63					Nancy Storey	502	Muhammad Ali	303

== 2010 election ==
The 2010 election was held on October 25, 2010. This was the first election in Richmond Hill where the ballots were tabulated electronically instead of manually. Issues in the election included regional transit planning (e.g. VIVA rapidways, Line 1 Yonge extension), the future of the David Dunlap Observatory, and debt in York Region.

2010 Richmond Hill Election Results
Position	Electee
Mayor	Dave Barrow
Local and Regional Councillor	Vito Spatafora
Local and Regional Councillor	Brenda Hogg
Ward 1 Councillor	Greg Beros
Ward 2 Councillor	Carmine Perrelli
Ward 3 Councillor	Castro Liu
Ward 4 Councillor	Lynn Foster
Ward 5 Councillor	Nick Papa
Ward 6 Councillor	Godwin Chan

== 2014 election ==
The 2014 election was held on October 27, 2014.

2014 Richmond Hill Election Results
Mayor	Votes	Local and Regional Councillor	Votes	Ward 1	Votes	Ward 2	Votes	Ward 3	Votes	Ward 4	Votes	Ward 5	Votes	Ward 6	Votes
**Dave Barrow**	23397	**Vito Spatafora**	16112	**Greg Beros**	3426	**Tom Muench**	958	**Castro Liu**	3758	**David West**	3815	**Karen Cilevitz**	3405	**Godwin Chan**	4177
Carmine Perrelli	12320	**Brenda Hogg**	14145	Todd Hansen	1352	Stan Daneman	937	Donalda Johnson	950	Angel Freedman	2007	Nick Papa	2730	Frank Mastroianni	1365
Anastasios Baxevanidis	989	Joe DiPaola	13269	Trifon Haitas	749	Marjan Moridi-Arcuri	923	Alireza Rafiee	286	Ted Schneider	819	Ted Leider	1292	Igor Bily	190
		David Cohen	11561	Alex Khoroshylov	289	Ramona Singh	756	Davood Borojerdi-Azar	151						
		Karen Trofimchuk	3672			Keith Menezes	734								
						Ally Hemani	535								
						Paul Tuen Muk	216								
						Paul Pilli	196								
						Morteza Behrooz	104								

== 2018 election ==
The 2018 election was held on October 22, 2018.

2018 Richmond Hill Election Results
Mayor	Votes	Local and Regional Councillor	Votes	Ward 1	Votes	Ward 2	Votes	Ward 3	Votes	Ward 4	Votes	Ward 5	Votes	Ward 6	Votes
**Dave Barrow**	23304	**Joe DiPaola**	11758	**Greg Beros**	2323	**Tom Muench**	1827	**Castro Liu**	Accl.	**David West**	3963	**Karen Cilevitz**	3137	**Godwin Chan**	4146
Susan Korman	4756	**Carmine Perrelli**	11418	Carol Davidson	1687	Scott Thompson	1076			Bob Aurora	1228	Nick Papa	2247	Julie Maxey	912
Abu Alam	1238	Carol Chan	9448	Lidia Kafieh	1167	Keith Menezes	636			Michael D'Amelio	799	Mahnaz Shahbazi	542		
Ali Noroozi	770	Jason Cherniak	8878	Trifon Haitas	211	Michael Aziz	520					Nima Shahi	129		
Mino Tari	567	Ramin Faraji	3706			Mike Rajbar	284								
		Weibo Cheng	3523												
		Sabine Ho	2605												
		Murtaza Bhujwalla	1269												

== 2022 mayoral by-election ==
2022 Richmond Hill mayoral by-election
- January 24, 2022
- Turnout: 32.10% (▲4.47pp)
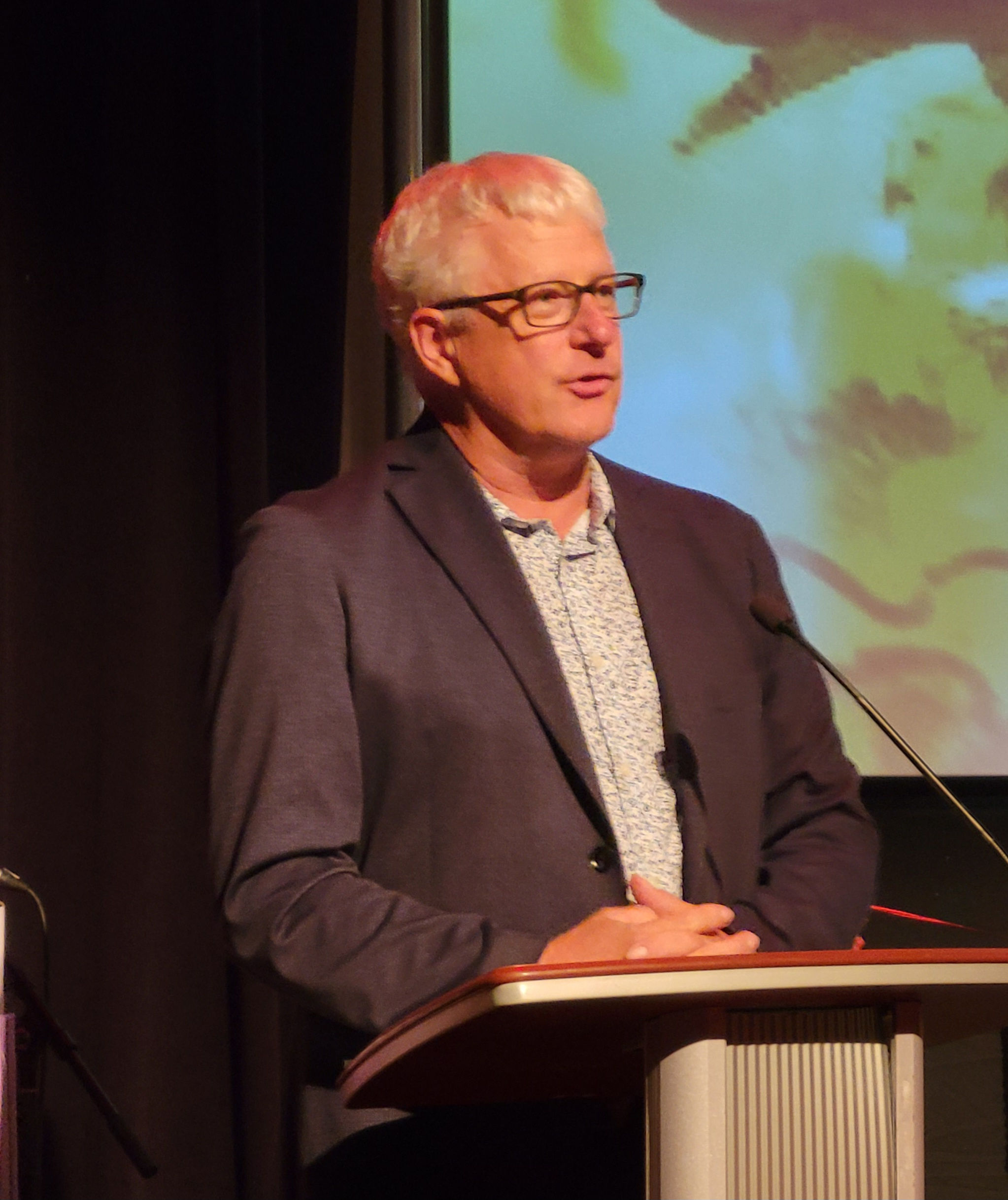
Nominee	David West	Godwin Chan
Popular vote	13,053	10,167
Percentage	33.55%	26.13%
Nominee	Carmine Perrelli	Joe DiPaola
Popular vote	8,017	6,074
Percentage	20.60%	15.61%
Mayor before election
Dave Barrow
Elected mayor
David West

The 2022 mayoral by-election was held on January 18-24, 2022. City council passed By-Law 133-21 on October 13, 2021 authorizing the use of internet voting to accommodate voters for the by-election during the COVID-19 pandemic.

=== Reasons for the by-election ===
Then incumbent mayor Dave Barrow went on indefinite medical leave on February 24, 2021, leaving city council with 8 voting members. According to local media reports, this left city council frequently gridlocked, as there was no leader in council and council votes would often end in a tie. City council meetings were characterized as "dysfunctional", where members would divulge into squabbling and name-calling.

Barrow returned to preside over a special council meeting on September 8, 2021 regarding the future of the governance of council given the inefficiencies during his absence. Four councillors left the meeting in protest before it was adjourned. On September 15, 2021, Barrow retired as mayor.

On September 29, 2021, city council agreed to hold a by-election to fill the mayor's vacant seat instead of appointing a mayor.

=== Candidates ===
- Godwin Chan, incumbent city councillor (Ward 6)
- Joe DiPaola, acting mayor and one of two incumbent regional councillors
- Susan Korman, CEO, Furry Friends Company
- Carmine Perrelli, deputy mayor and one of two incumbent regional councillors
- Ruida Tian, Founder/CEO, Smair Inc.
- Rona Wang, President & CEO at GoBest Immigration Services
- David West, incumbent city councillor (Ward 4)
- Juni Yeung, music teacher, author, cultural historian, and interpreter
- Michael Zambakkides, Vice president, Z3 Controls

=== Results ===
2022 Richmond Hill Mayoral By-election Results
Candidate	Votes	Share
**David West**	13053	33.55%
Godwin Chan	10167	26.13%
Carmine Perrelli	8017	20.60%
Joe DiPaola	6074	15.61%
Rona Wang	406	1.04%
Ruida Tian	389	1.00%
Susan Korman	364	0.94%
Michael Zambakkides	237	0.61%
Juni Yeung	202	0.52%

Voter turnout for this election was 32.10%.

== 2022 election ==
The 2022 election was held on October 24, 2022.

Mayoral candidate	Vote	%
**David West** (X)	**28,318**	**70.18**
Carmine Perrelli	10,304	25.54
Domenic Bardari	1,155	2.86
Holo Devnani	572	1.42

=== City council ===
==== Regional council ====
Two to be elected.

Council candidate	Vote	%
**Godwin Chan**	**25,392**	**38.61**
**Joe DiPaola** (X)	**18,334**	**27.88**
Terrence Au	12,005	18.25
Marco Coletta	7,617	11.58
Abu Alam	2,424	3.69

==== Ward 1 ====
Council candidate	Vote	%
**Carol Davidson**	**3,201**	**45.88**
Greg Beros (X)	1,856	26.60
Catherine Dellerba	1,301	18.65
Weibo Cheng	619	8.87

==== Ward 2 ====
Council candidate	Vote	%
**Scott Thompson**	**2,028**	**39.37**
Tom Muench (X)	1,597	31.00
Sigmund Lee	816	15.84
Yehuda Goldberg	536	10.41
Tabinda Jatoi	174	3.38

==== Ward 3 ====
Council candidate	Vote	%
**Castro Liu** (X)	**5,299**	**84.92**
Juni Yeung	941	15.08

==== Ward 4 ====
Council candidate	Vote	%
**Simon Cui**	**2,498**	**32.34**
Raika Sheppard (X)	2,235	28.93
Rose A. Weinberg	1,735	22.46
Liana Falzone	459	5.94
Johnny So	328	4.25
Mahnaz Shahbazi	247	3.20
Harry H. Harakh	223	2.89

==== Ward 5 ====
Council candidate	Vote	%
**Karen Cilevitz** (X)	**1,525**	**23.34**
Tarun Saroya	828	12.67
Richard Rupp	749	11.46
Yuliya Benedziktavich	673	10.30
Anders Lindfors-Wheeler	655	10.02
Wil Husnutdinov	595	9.11
Vera Murano	546	8.36
Sarkis Assadourian	467	7.15
Shohreh Sabaghpour	396	6.06
Emmanuel Lazaris	100	1.53

==== Ward 6 ====
Council candidate	Vote	%
**Michael Shiu**	**1,893**	**27.66**
Linda Zhang	1,685	24.62
Carol Chan	1,254	18.32
Sharon Chisholm	819	11.96
Kate Jiang	695	10.15
Julie Maxey	269	3.93
Yung Li	230	3.36
