= 2022 York Region municipal elections =

Elections in Ontario, Canada

2022 York Region municipal election
- October 24, 2022
Incumbent Council
(2018)

Elections in the Regional Municipality of York of Ontario, Canada were held on October 24, 2022, in conjunction with municipal elections across the province.

Incumbents are marked with "(X)".

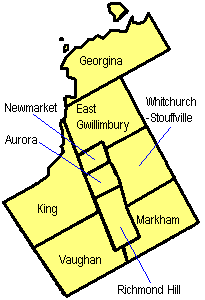
Map of York Region and the municipalities it includes.

== York Regional Council ==
Position	Representing	Councillor	Notes
Chair		Wayne Emmerson	Chairman and CEO
Councillor	Aurora	Tom Mrakas	Mayor of Aurora
Councillor	East Gwillimbury	Virginia Hackson	Mayor of East Gwillimbury
Councillor	Georgina	Margaret Quirk	Mayor of Georgina
Councillor	Georgina	Naomi Davison	
Councillor	King	Steve Pellegrini	Mayor of King
Councillor	Markham	Frank Scarpitti	Mayor of Markham
Councillor	Markham	Joe Li	
Councillor	Markham	Jim Jones	
Councillor	Markham	Michael Chan	Deputy Mayor of Markham
Councillor	Markham	Alan Ho	
Councillor	Newmarket	John Taylor	Mayor of Newmarket
Councillor	Newmarket	Tom Vegh	Deputy Mayor of Newmarket
Councillor	Richmond Hill	David West	Mayor of Richmond Hill
Councillor	Richmond Hill	Joe DiPaola	
Councillor	Richmond Hill	Godwin Chan	
Councillor	Vaughan	Steven Del Duca	Mayor of Vaughan
Councillor	Vaughan	Linda Jackson	Deputy Mayor of Vaughan
Councillor	Vaughan	Mario Ferri	
Councillor	Vaughan	Gino Rosati	
Councillor	Vaughan	Mario Racco	
Councillor	Whitchurch–Stouffville	Iain Lovatt	Mayor of Whitchurch–Stouffville

== Regional chair ==
The chair of the council is usually elected by members of the council at the first council meeting. However, the provincial government ended up appointing Wayne Emmerson to the position in 2022. Mr. Emmerson later retired, and the York Region Chairman in 2026 is Eric Jolliffe.

== Aurora ==
List of candidates:

=== Mayor ===
Incumbent mayor Tom Mrakas was challenged by businessperson Phiona Durrant and writer, editor and photographer Anna Lozyk Romeo.

Mayoral candidate	Vote	%
Tom Mrakas (X)	7,743	69.49
Anna Lozyk Romeo	1,802	16.17
Phiona Durrant	1,597	14.33

=== Aurora Town Council ===
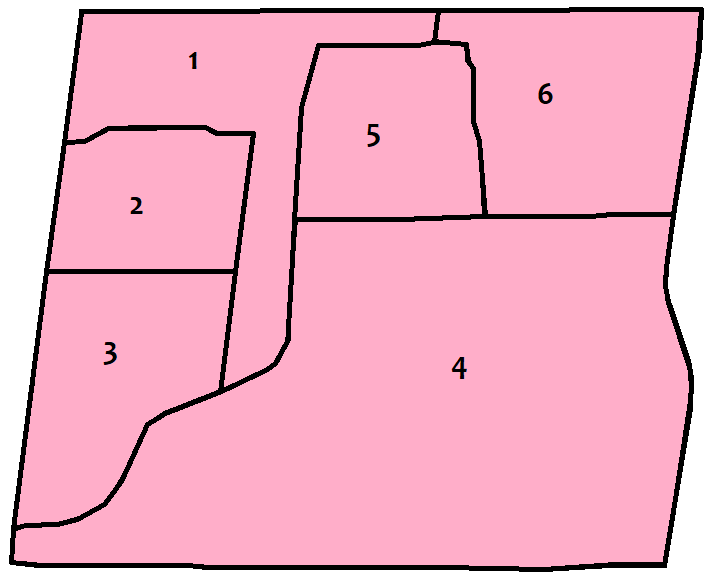
Map of Aurora's six new wards

In 2020, Aurora Council passed a by-law establishing a ward system. Previously Aurora councillors were elected at an at-large basis.

==== Ward 1 ====
Candidate	Vote	%
Ron Weese	1,445	62.18
Sandra Humfryes (X)	631	27.15
Nick Biase	248	10.67

==== Ward 2 ====
Candidate	Vote	%
Rachel Gilliland (X)	1,070	52.71
Marco Di Girolamo	492	24.24
Daniel Lajeunesse	256	12.61
Alison Connolly	212	10.44

==== Ward 3 ====
Candidate	Vote	%
Wendy Gaertner (X)	1,210	47.90
Harold MacDonald	546	21.62
Alexandra Bonham	423	16.75
Owen Heritage	347	13.74

==== Ward 4 ====
Candidate	Vote	%
Michael Thompson (X)	744	69.73
Iwona Czarnecka	274	25.68
Carson Day	49	4.59

==== Ward 5 ====
Candidate	Vote	%
John Gallo (X)	602	30.25
Mae Khamissa	514	25.83
Steve Fleck	424	21.31
Robert Lounds	231	11.61
Ian Clark	219	11.01

==== Ward 6 ====
Candidate	Vote	%
Harold Kim (X)	801	72.55
Greg Smith	198	17.93
Robert James Fraser	105	9.51

== East Gwillimbury ==
East Gwillimbury elected two councillors per ward. Incumbent mayor Virginia Hackson ran against her predecessor James Young and 2018 candidate Franco Colavecchia. Voter turnout was reported as being just 25%. The lists of candidates for East Gwillimbury Council are as follows:

=== Mayor ===
Mayoral candidate	Vote	%
Virginia Hackson (X)	3,266	51.51
James R. Young	2,797	44.11
Franco Colavecchia	278	4.38

=== Ward 1 ===
Candidate	Vote	%
Loralea Carruthers (X)	Acclaimed	
Terry E. Foster (X)	Acclaimed	

=== Ward 2 ===
Candidate	Vote	%
Brian Johns	1,287	41.9
Tara Roy-DiClemente (X)	1,118	36.4
Aida Kostuck	498	16.2
David Price	171	5.5

=== Ward 3 ===
Candidate	Vote	%
Scott Crone (X)	1,524	35.7
Susan Lahey	1,072	25.1
Christine Glenn	943	22.1
Cathy Morton (X)	526	12.3
Douglas Willitts	201	4.7

== Georgina ==
The results for mayor and for the council of Georgina are as follows:

=== Mayor ===
Mayoral candidate	Vote	%
Margaret Quirk (X)	4,683	47.25
Jeffrey Cathcart	2,182	22.02
Ralph Hirmann	1,263	12.74
Frank Sebo	968	9.77
Boris Godzinevski	568	5.73
George Sheffield	246	2.48

=== Georgina Town Council ===
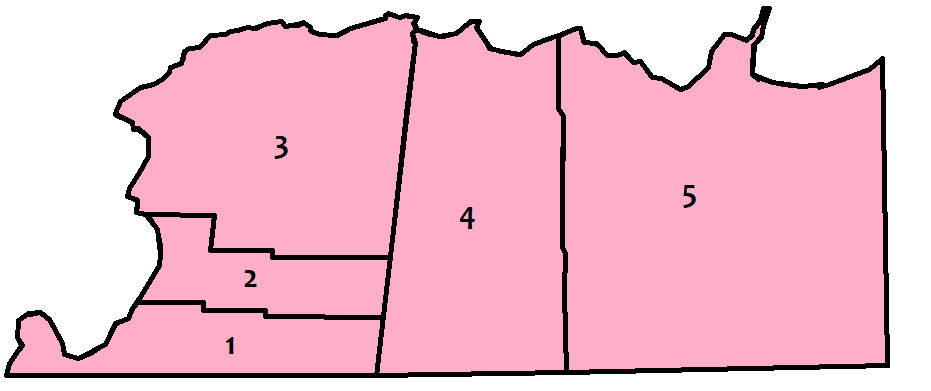
Map of Georgina's 5 wards

==== Regional Councillor ====
Council candidate	Vote	%
Naomi Davison	6,640	70.96
Dawn Zimmermann	2,717	29.04

==== Ward 1 ====
Council candidate	Vote	%
Charlene Biggerstaff	896	55.86
Allison Cain	336	20.95
Mike Taggart	300	18.70
Mona Steitieh	72	4.49

==== Ward 2 ====
Council candidate	Vote	%
Dan Fellini (X)	1,048	43.45
Natalie Floyd	781	32.38
Shannon DeLenardo	583	24.17

==== Ward 3 ====
Council candidate	Vote	%
Dave Neeson (X)	1,150	50.88
Andrew Edge	598	26.46
Danielle Cohen	358	15.84
Scott Wollin	154	6.81

==== Ward 4 ====
Council candidate	Vote	%
Dale Kerr Genge	884	40.40
Mike Anderson	830	37.93
Amanda Pace	302	13.80
Laurie Pangman	172	7.86

==== Ward 5 ====
Council candidate	Vote	%
Lee Dale	923	69.92
Kelly McCarthy	397	30.08

== King ==
The results for mayor and for the council of King Township are as follows:

=== Mayor ===
Steve Pellegrini was re-elected mayor of the Township of King by acclamation. Ward 2 councillor David Boyd and Ward 6 councillor Avia Eek were also acclaimed:

Mayoral candidate	Vote	%
Steve Pellegrini (X)	Acclaimed	

=== Ward 1 ===
Candidate	Vote	%
Jordan Alexander Cescolini (X)	738	55.6
Rob Payne	518	39.0
Nick Seretis	71	5.4

=== Ward 2 ===
Candidate	Vote	%
David Boyd (X)	Acclaimed	

=== Ward 3 ===
Candidate	Vote	%
Jennifer Anstey	228	41.6
Adam Pham	192	35.0
Jakob Schneider (X)	120	21.9
Ryan Raymond	8	1.5

=== Ward 4 ===
Candidate	Vote	%
Mary Asselstine	553	44.6
Simon Lloyd	502	40.5
Michael Lovisotto	120	9.7
Becky Eveson	64	5.2

=== Ward 5 ===
Candidate	Vote	%
Debbie Schaefer (X)	575	64.7
Michael Di Mascolo	314	35.3

=== Ward 6 ===
Candidate	Vote	%
Avia Eek (X)	Acclaimed	

== Markham ==
The results for mayor and for the council of Markham are as follows:

=== Mayor ===
2022 Markham Mayoral election
- October 24, 2022
- Turnout: 31.17%
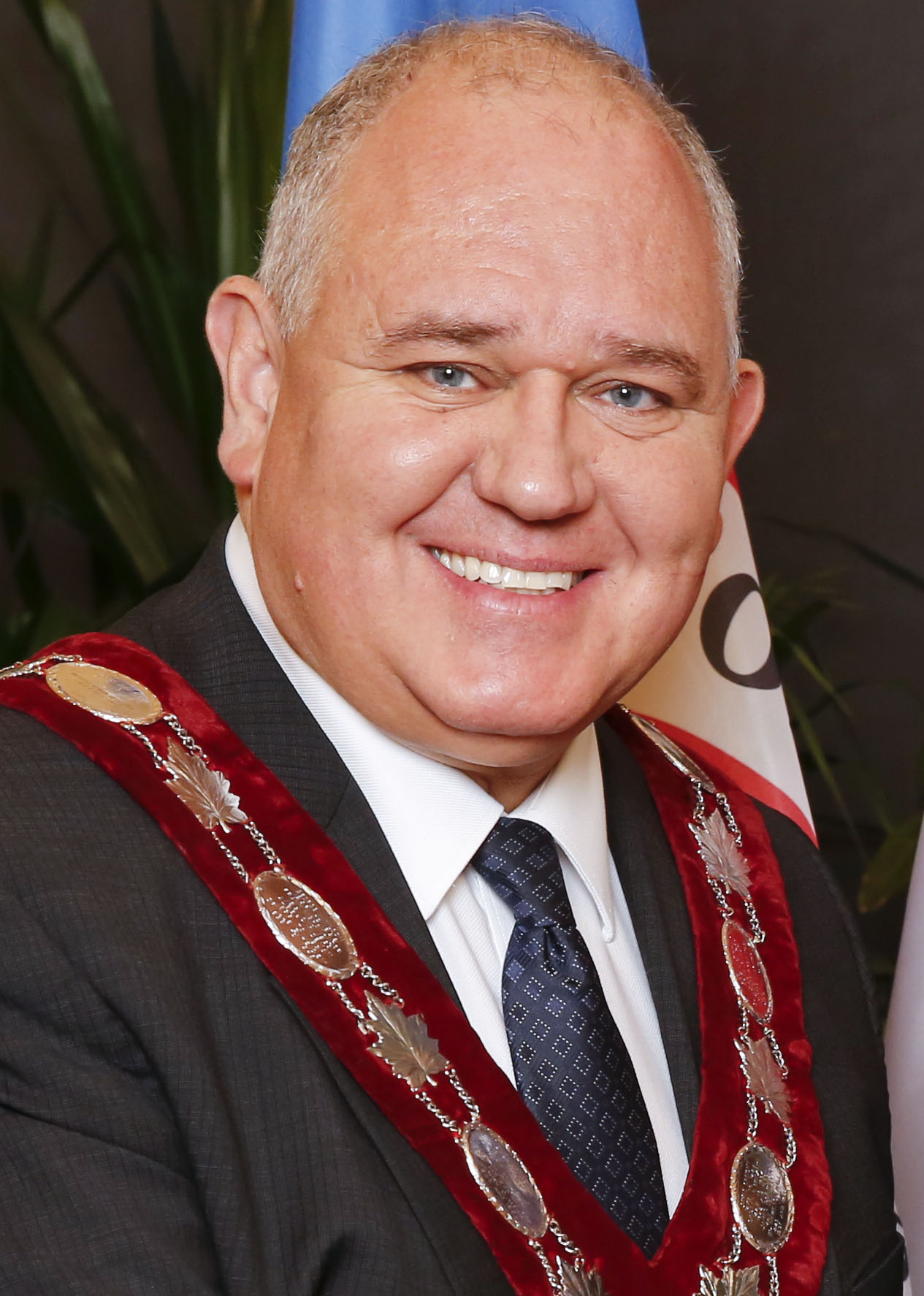
		DH
Candidate	Frank Scarpitti	Don Hamilton
Popular vote	44,172	24,469
Percentage	64.35%	35.65%
Mayor before election
Frank Scarpitti
Elected mayor
Frank Scarpitti

Mayor Frank Scarpitti was challenged by deputy mayor Don Hamilton.

Mayoral candidate	Vote	%
Frank Scarpitti (X)	44,172	64.35
Don Hamilton	24,469	35.65

=== City Council ===
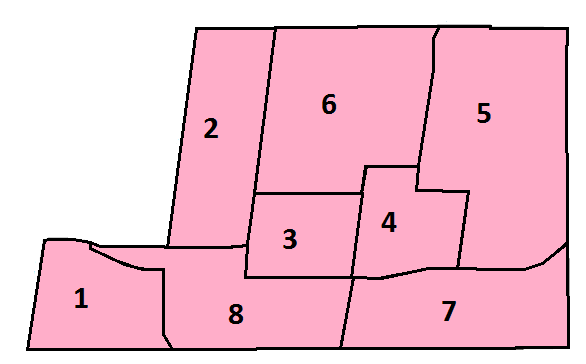
Map of Markham's 8 wards

==== Regional Councillor ====
In Markham, Regional Councillors serve on both the City Council as well as York Region Council. Electors can vote for up to four candidates on their ballots, equal to the total number that may be elected. The four winning candidates are those who receive the highest number of votes. The candidate with the highest number of votes received also serves as Deputy Mayor.

Council candidate	Vote	%
Michael Chan	30,095	14.41
Jim Jones (X)	26,578	12.72
Joe Li (X)	25,823	12.36
Alan Ho	24,735	11.84
Nirmala Armstrong	23,183	11.10
Allan Tam	18,548	8.88
Shanta Sundarason	15,774	7.55
Sophia Sun	13,639	6.53
Greg Marcos	12,471	5.97
Ivy Lee	12,356	5.92
Srini Suppira	5,678	2.72

==== Ward 1 ====
Council candidate	Vote	%
Keith Irish (X)	6,095	74.37
Howard Shore	2,101	25.63

==== Ward 2 ====
Council candidate	Vote	%
Ritch Lau	3,012	36.36
Yan Wang	1,866	22.53
Larry Lau	1,573	18.99
Trina Kollis	937	11.31
Steven Sun	895	10.81

==== Ward 3 ====
Council candidate	Vote	%
Reid McAlpine (X)	5,007	56.75
Sandra Tam	1,023	11.59
Bill Chan	990	11.22
Robin Choy	882	10.00
Sheng Huang	501	5.68
Annie Chan	420	4.76

==== Ward 4 ====
Council candidate	Vote	%
Karen Rea (X)	8,563	92.22
Vid Sansanwal	722	7.78

==== Ward 5 ====
Council candidate	Vote	%
Andrew Keyes (X)	5,120	72.88
Sri Sivasubramaniam	1,372	19.53
Ashok Bangia	533	7.59

==== Ward 6 ====
Council candidate	Vote	%
Amanda Yeung Collucci (X)	4,921	78.71
Darren Soo	1,331	21.29

==== Ward 7 ====
Council candidate	Vote	%
Juanita Nathan	5,388	47.75
Nimisha Patel	2,648	23.47
Shahzad Habib	1,955	17.33
Neetu Gupta	1,292	11.45

==== Ward 8 ====
Council candidate	Vote	%
Isa Lee (X)	6,549	80.81
Nihanthan Ratnasingham	640	7.90
Jack Levinson	485	5.98
Deepak Talreja	430	5.31

== Newmarket ==
The results for mayor and for the council of Newmarket are as follows:

=== Mayor ===
Mayoral candidate	Vote	%
John Taylor (X)	Acclaimed	

=== Newmarket Town Council ===
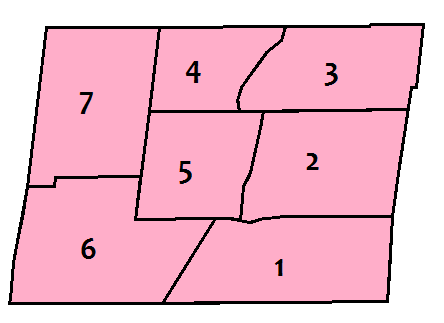
Map of Newmarket's seven wards

==== Deputy mayor and regional councillor ====
Candidate	Vote	%
Tom Vegh (X)	9,396	63.27
Gordon Prentice	5,455	36.73

==== Ward 1 ====
Council candidate	Vote	%
Grace Simon (X)	1,899	70.52
Mark Holmes	794	29.48

==== Ward 2 ====
Council candidate	Vote	%
Victor Woodhouse (X)	1,211	53.99
Brian Andrews	841	37.49
Hunter Murchison-Doggart	191	8.52

==== Ward 3 ====
Council candidate	Vote	%
Jane Twinney (X)	Acclaimed	

==== Ward 4 ====
Council candidate	Vote	%
Trevor Morrison (X)	1,222	57.91
Grant Waddell	627	29.72
Chris Dupee	261	12.37

==== Ward 5 ====
Council candidate	Vote	%
Bob Kwapis (X)	Acclaimed	

==== Ward 6 ====
Council candidate	Vote	%
Kelly Broome (X)	1,726	70.19
Lukas Fuina	733	29.81

==== Ward 7 ====
Council candidate	Vote	%
Christina Bisanz (X)	1,687	76.20
Nadia Hansen	527	23.80

== Richmond Hill ==
The results for mayor and for the council of Richmond Hill were as follows:

=== Mayor ===
David West, who was elected in a by-election in January 2022, was challenged in a re-match against Regional Councillor Carmine Perrelli, who finished third in the by-election.

2022 Richmond Hill mayoral election
- October 24, 2022
- Turnout: 31.48%
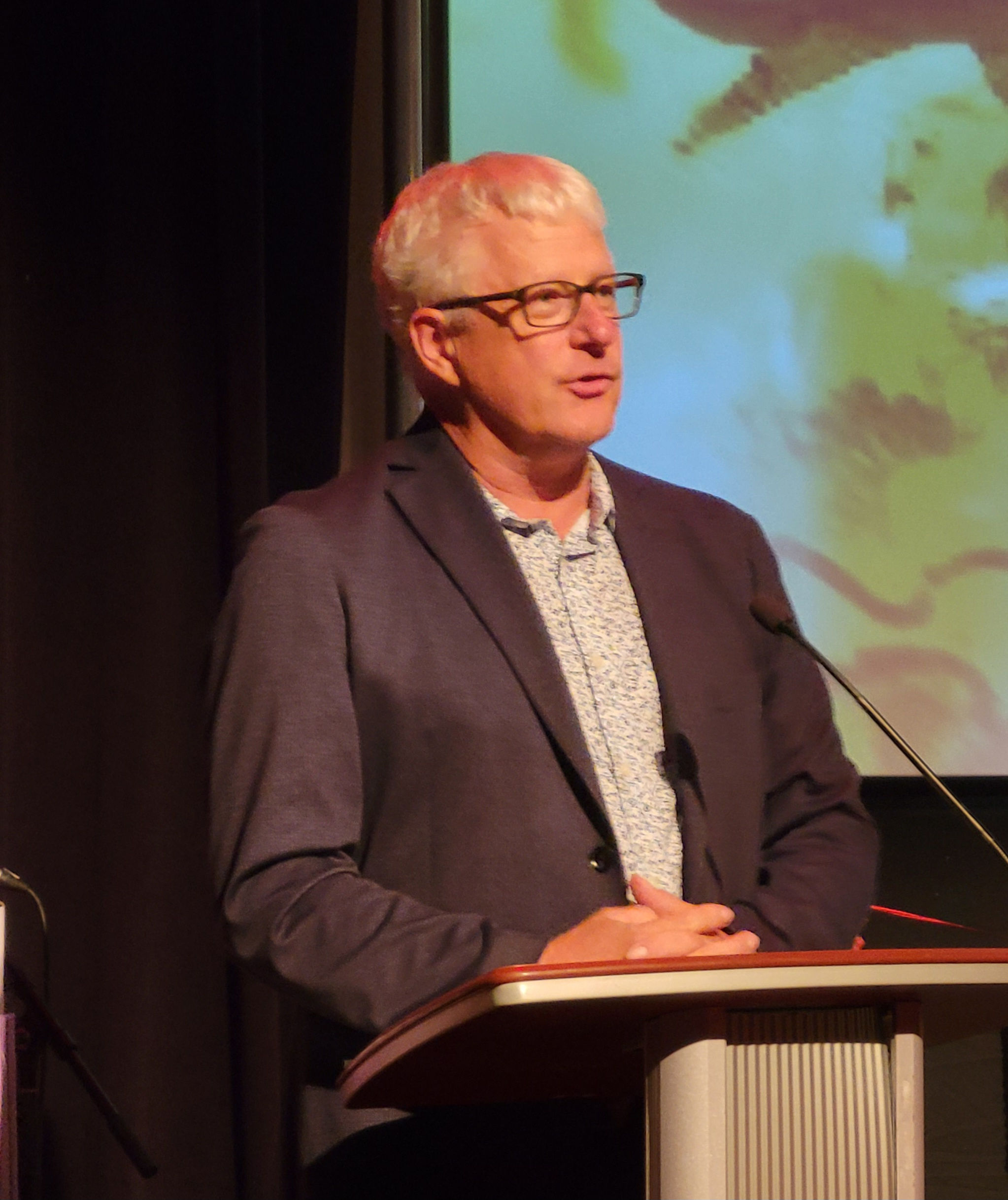
		CMP
Nominee	David West	Carmine Perrelli
Popular vote	28,318	10,304
Percentage	70.18%	25.54%
Mayor before election
David West
Elected mayor
David West

Mayoral candidate	Vote	%
David West (X)	28,318	70.18
Carmine Perrelli	10,304	25.54
Domenic Bardari	1,155	2.86
Holo Devnani	572	1.42

=== Richmond Hill City Council ===
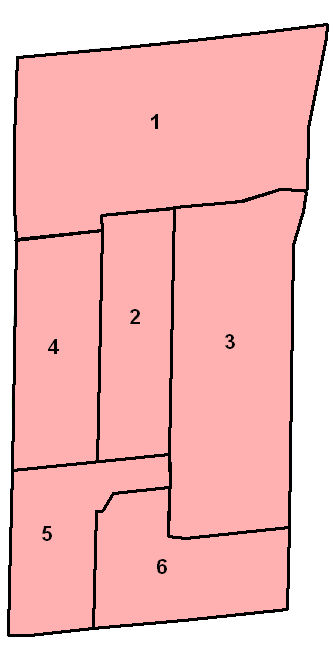
Map of Richmond Hill's six wards

==== Regional council ====
Two to be elected.

Council candidate	Vote	%
Godwin Chan	25,392	38.61
Joe DiPaola (X)	18,334	27.88
Terrence Au	12,005	18.25
Marco Coletta	7,617	11.58
Abu Alam	2,424	3.69

==== Ward 1 ====
Council candidate	Vote	%
Carol Davidson	3,201	45.88
Greg Beros (X)	1,856	26.60
Catherine Dellerba	1,301	18.65
Weibo Cheng	619	8.87

==== Ward 2 ====
Council candidate	Vote	%
Scott Thompson	2,028	39.37
Tom Muench (X)	1,597	31.00
Sigmund Lee	816	15.84
Yehuda Goldberg	536	10.41
Tabinda Jatoi	174	3.38

==== Ward 3 ====
Council candidate	Vote	%
Castro Liu (X)	5,299	84.92
Juni Yeung	941	15.08

==== Ward 4 ====
Council candidate	Vote	%
Simon Cui	2,498	32.34
Raika Sheppard (X)	2,235	28.93
Rose A. Weinberg	1,735	22.46
Liana Falzone	459	5.94
Johnny So	328	4.25
Mahnaz Shahbazi	247	3.20
Harry H. Harakh	223	2.89

==== Ward 5 ====
Council candidate	Vote	%
Karen Cilevitz (X)	1,525	23.34
Tarun Saroya	828	12.67
Richard Rupp	749	11.46
Yuliya Benedziktavich	673	10.30
Anders Lindfors-Wheeler	655	10.02
Wil Husnutdinov	595	9.11
Vera Murano	546	8.36
Sarkis Assadourian	467	7.15
Shohreh Sabaghpour	396	6.06
Emmanuel Lazaris	100	1.53

==== Ward 6 ====
Council candidate	Vote	%
Michael Shiu	1,893	27.66
Linda Zhang	1,685	24.62
Carol Chan	1,254	18.32
Sharon Chisholm	819	11.96
Kate Jiang	695	10.15
Julie Maxey	269	3.93
Yung Li	230	3.36

== Vaughan ==
The size of Vaughan's council will increase by one with the addition of a regional councillor. The list of candidates for mayor and for the council of Vaughan are as follows:

=== Mayor ===
2022 Vaughan Mayoral election
- October 24, 2022
- Turnout: 26.96%
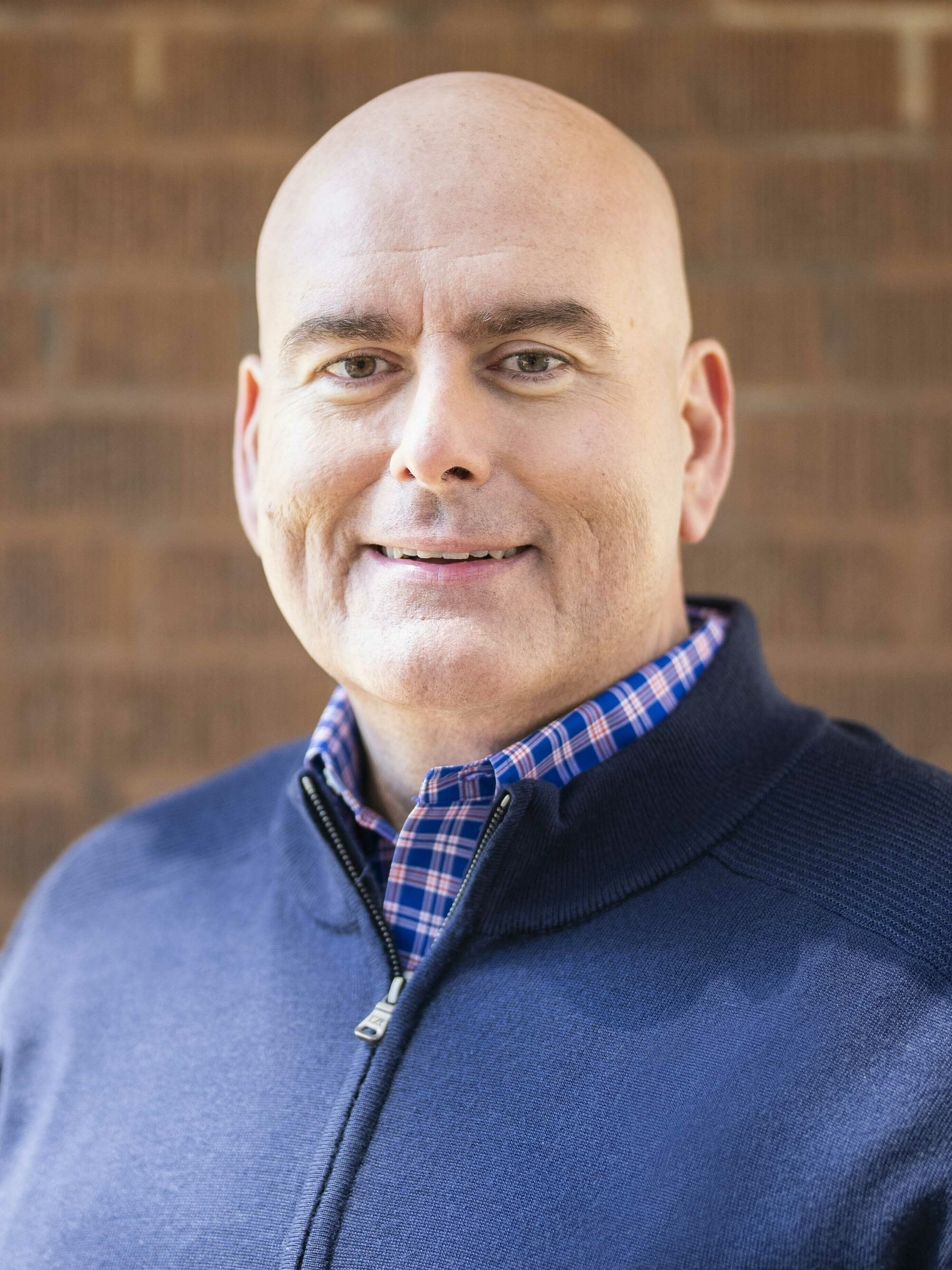
		SYR	DD
Candidate	Steven Del Duca	Sandra Yeung Racco	Danny DeSantis
Popular vote	22,699	21,848	7,591
Percentage	38.06%	36.64%	12.73%
Mayor before election
Maurizio Bevilacqua
Elected mayor
Steven Del Duca

Incumbent mayor Maurizio Bevilacqua is not running for re-election. Former Ontario Liberal Party leader Steven Del Duca is running against long-time city councillor Sandra Yeung Racco.

Mayoral candidate	Vote	%
Steven Del Duca	22,699	38.06
Sandra Yeung Racco	21,848	36.64
Danny DeSantis	7591	12.72
Paul Donofrio	2697	4.52
Lino Mancinella	2427	4.07
Parveen Bola	1492	2.50
Robert Gulassarian	880	1.48

==== Withdrawn ====
Deb Schulte, former MP and Minister of Seniors. Schulte withdrew after her cancer re-diagnosis and then endorsed Del Duca.

==== Opinion polls ====
Polling firm	Link	Last date of polling	Sample Size	Margin of error	Parveen Bola	Steven Del Duca	Danny DeSantis	Paul Donofrio	Robert Gulassarian	Hiten Patel	Sandra Yeung Racco	Undecided
Mainstreet	PDF	July 25, 2022	506	±4.4%	2	22	-	-	6	0	7	30
Mainstreet		October 17, 2022	452	±4.6%	3	23	5	3	2	-	13	50

=== Vaughan City Council ===
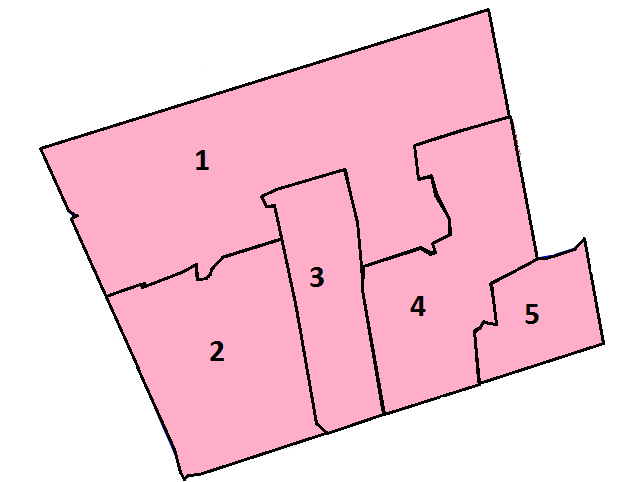
Map of Vaughan's five wards

==== Regional council ====
Four to be elected.

Council candidate	Vote	%
Linda D. Jackson (X)	28,398	17.08
Mario Ferri (X)	27,937	16.80
Gino Rosati (X)	27,457	16.51
Mario G. Racco	19,564	11.77
Nick Pinto	18,467	11.11
Carrie Liddy	12,502	7.52
Mario Di Nardo	12,298	7.40
John Santoro	10,113	6.08
Mandy Rai	9,524	5.73

==== Ward 1 ====
Council candidate	Vote	%
Marilyn Iafrate (X)	8,771	64.72
Vince Scaramuzzo	2,020	14.90
Justin Piersanti	828	6.11
Sony Abraham	766	5.65
Maeda Aslam	645	4.76
Stephen Fefer	523	3.86

==== Ward 2 ====
Council candidate	Vote	%
Adriano Volpentesta	7,229	53.91
Tony Carella (X)	4,042	30.14
Simone Barbieri	1,150	8.58
Lena Ibrahim	433	3.23
Meera Anand	278	2.07
Bryan Gary Groulx	277	2.07

==== Ward 3 ====
Council candidate	Vote	%
Rosanna DeFrancesca (X)	6,643	51.63
Ty Ty Nguyen	2,407	18.71
Victor Lacaria	2,373	18.44
Gino Nardi	693	5.39
Tony Lorini	665	5.17
Philip James Piluris	86	0.67

==== Ward 4 ====
Council candidate	Vote	%
Chris Ainsworth	2,705	38.73
Styles Q. Weinberg	1,573	22.52
Nadia Rosati	1,071	15.33
Erlinda Insigne	627	8.98
Jacob Joel Ginsberg	562	8.05
Meenakashi Sudarshan	447	6.40

==== Ward 5 ====
Alan Shefman, city councillor for Ward 5 and one of the longest serving councillors in Vaughan was defeated for re-election by former MPP Gila Martow. Her win was attributed to her status in the area and personal popularity.

Council candidate	Vote	%
Gila Martow	6,601	54.56
Alan Shefman (X)	5,497	45.44

== Whitchurch-Stouffville ==
The results for mayor and for the council of Whitchurch-Stouffville are as follows:

=== Mayor ===
Mayoral candidate	Vote	%
Iain Lovatt (X)	6,125	51.67
Justin Atlmann	3,087	26.04
Mark Carroll	1,343	11.33
Anand Daté	1,148	9.68
Sher Ahmad	152	1.28

=== Whitchurch-Stouffville Town Council ===
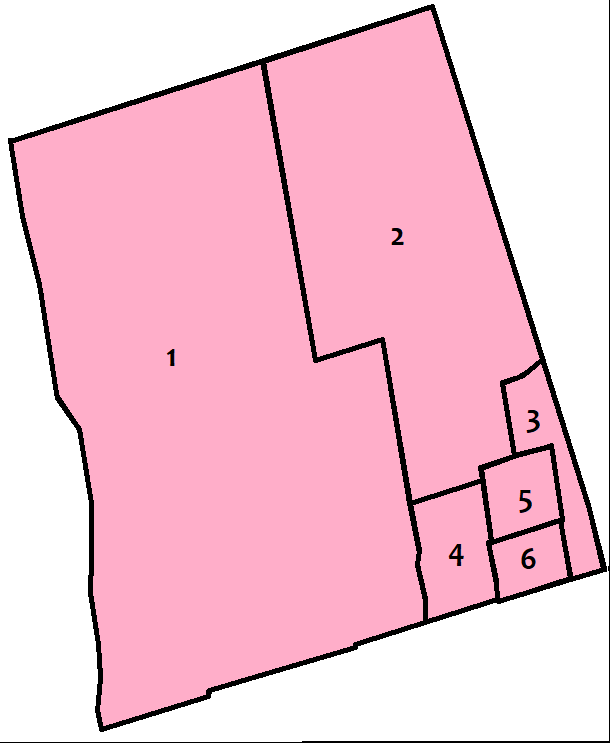
Map of Whitchurch-Stouffville's six new wards

The Town re-drew its ward boundaries in 2020 for the 2022 election.

==== Ward 1 ====
Council candidate	Vote	%
Hugo T. Kroon (X)	651	56.96
Michael Cleverdon	289	25.28
Juliette Deonarian	203	17.76

==== Ward 2 ====
Council candidate	Vote	%
Maurice Smith (X)	1,253	52.80
George Karpouzis	1,120	47.20

==== Ward 3 ====
Council candidate	Vote	%
Keith Acton	747	59.62
Mike Humphreys	506	40.38

==== Ward 4 ====
Council candidate	Vote	%
Rick Upton (X)	1,395	59.44
Brad Valentini	357	15.21
Keith Singer	351	14.96
Daniel Zeraldo	244	10.40

==== Ward 5 ====
Council candidate	Vote	%
Richard Bartley (X)	1,198	58.75
Laura Cusack	841	41.25

==== Ward 6 ====
Council candidate	Vote	%
Sue Sherban (X)	1,388	52.66
Rob Hargrave	838	31.79
Angel Freedman	410	15.55

== York Region District School Board ==
Georgina and East Gwillimbury
Trustee Candidate	Vote	%
Carolyn Butterworth	6275	49.3
Cynthia Cordova (X)	3939	31.0
Jeremy Smith	1615	12.7
Mark Schlotzhauer	894	7.0

Aurora and Whitchurch-Stouffville
Trustee Candidate	Vote	%
Melanie Wright	5191	32.0
Elizabeth Terrell (X)	2677	16.5
Luther C. Brown	2522	15.5
Sled-Lucas Mary	2245	13.8
Bridget Kilgallon	1827	11.3
Asim Sayed	1770	10.9

King and Vaughan, Ward 1
Trustee Candidate	Vote	%
Nadeem Mahmood (X)	3601	40.1
Mike Behar	3361	37.5
Simon Strelchik	2012	22.4

Markham, Ward 1 and 8
Trustee Candidate	Vote	%
Jenny Chen	5194	42.8
Susan Geller	2360	19.4
Karen Walton	1871	15.4
Srdjana Jaksic	1137	9.4
Nafiseh Pourhassani	1021	8.4
Sarma Donepudi	563	4.6

Markham, Wards 2 and 6
Trustee Candidate	Vote	%
Ron Lynn (X)	6647	59.4
Christine Calanchie	4547	40.6

Markham, Wards 3 and 4
Trustee Candidate	Vote	%
Ed Law	3595	27.4
Ben Hendriks	3258	24.9
Jerrica Lin	3151	24.1
Alyssa Shi	1513	11.6
Nadhiena Shankar	894	6.8
Xu Dong Lu	688	5.3

Markham, Wards 5 and 7
Trustee Candidate	Vote	%
Michael Chen	4566	29.2
Rukshan Para	4251	27.2
Ali Chatha	3374	21.6
Ruby Ratnasingham	1673	10.7
Shusmita Sharma	1039	6.6
Geetha Thambiah	734	4.7

Source: City of Markham

Newmarket
Trustee Candidate	Vote	%
Pamela McCarthy	4414	38.8
Shameela Shakeel	4034	35.4
Donald J. Smith	1622	14.2
Jessica Neto	1316	11.6

Richmond Hill, Wards 1, 2, and 4
Trustee Candidate	Vote	%
Crystal Yu	5369	36.7
Robert Kolosowski	4570	31.2
Jyoti Oberoi	2090	14.3
Jonathan Nadler	1656	11.3
Ali Nikjoo	963	6.6

Richmond Hill, Wards 3, 5, and 6
Trustee Candidate	Vote	%
Cindy Liang (X)	11253	73.8
Sadra Nasseri	3993	26.2

Source: City of Richmond Hill

Vaughan Wards 2 and 3
Trustee Candidate	Vote	%
Elizabeth Sinclair (X)	7292	68.6
Nicole Huskovic	3345	31.4

Vaughan Wards 4 and 5
Trustee Candidate	Vote	%
Estelle Cohen	6148	42.4
David Epstein	3312	22.9
Paul Black	1814	12.5
Matthew Forbes	1641	11.3
Mishel Schwartz	1572	10.9

Source: City of Vaughan

=== Indigenous Trustee ===
The Indigenous trustee is a voting, appointed member of the board.

=== Student Trustees ===
Student trustees are non-voting members appointed by the York Region President's Council (YRPC), a body consisting of all Student Council Presidents in York Region public secondary schools.

== York Catholic District School Board ==
Vaughan Ward 1
Trustee Candidate	Vote	%
Angela Saggese	3746	59.3
Teresa Ciaravella	2573	40.7

Vaughan Ward 2
Trustee Candidate	Vote	%
Michaela Sonya Barbieri	4045	58.7
Gianna Fracassi	2851	41.3

Vaughan Wards 3, 4, and 5
Trustee Candidate	Vote	%
Angela Grella	5862	39.4
Jennifer Wigston (X)	4612	31.0
Matt Cilla	2751	18.5
Peter De Quintal	1671	11.2

Source: City of Vaughan

== Conseil scolaire Viamonde ==
Vaughan
Trustee Candidate	Vote	%
Stefania Sigurdson Forbes	47	46.5
Nicolas Bigaignon	40	39.6
Hanane Jaouich	14	13.9

Source: City of Vaughan
