= 2018 York Region municipal elections =

Elections in Ontario, Canada

2018 York Region municipal election
- October 22, 2018
Incumbent Council
(2014)

Elections in the Regional Municipality of York, Ontario, were held on October 22, 2018, in conjunction with municipal elections across the province.

Incumbents are marked with "(X)".

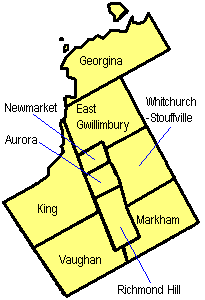
Map of York Region and the municipalities it includes.

== York Regional Council ==
Position	Representing	Councillor	Notes
Chair		Wayne Emmerson	
Councillor	Aurora	Tom Mrakas	Mayor of Aurora
Councillor	East Gwillimbury	Virginia Hackson	Mayor of East Gwillimbury
Councillor	Georgina	Margaret Quirk	Mayor of Georgina
Councillor	Georgina	Rob Grossi	
Councillor	King	Steve Pellegrini (acclaimed)	Mayor of King
Councillor	Markham	Frank Scarpitti	Mayor of Markham
Councillor	Markham	Don Hamilton	
Councillor	Markham	Jack Heath	
Councillor	Markham	Joe Li	
Councillor	Markham	Jim Jones	
Councillor	Newmarket	John Taylor	Mayor of Newmarket
Councillor	Newmarket	Tom Vegh	
Councillor	Richmond Hill	Dave Barrow	Mayor of Richmond Hill
Councillor	Richmond Hill	Joe DiPaola	
Councillor	Richmond Hill	Carmine Perelli	
Councillor	Vaughan	Maurizio Bevilacqua	Mayor of Vaughan
Councillor	Vaughan	Mario Ferri	
Councillor	Vaughan	Gino Rosati	
Councillor	Vaughan	Linda D. Jackson	
Councillor	Whitchurch–Stouffville	Iain Lovett	Mayor of Whitchurch–Stouffville

== Regional chair ==
The election was to be the first-ever direct election of the York Regional chair, but it was cancelled by the Ontario Government's passing of the Better Local Government Act.

== Aurora ==
Source for results:

=== Mayor ===
Mayoral candidate	Vote	%
Tom Mrakas	4,781	38.33
Geoff Dawe (X)	3,533	28.33
Chris Ballard	2,475	19.84
John Abel	1,684	13.50

=== Aurora Town Council ===
Six to be elected

Councillor Candidate	Vote	%
Harold Kim (X)	6,013	10.75
Wendy Gaertner (X)	5,875	10.50
Sandra Humfryes (X)	5,456	9.75
Michael Thompson (X)	4,991	8.92
Rachel Gilliland	4,800	8.58
John Gallo	4,781	8.55
Vicky McGrath	4,112	7.35
Adam Mobbs	4,082	7.30
Anna Kroeplin	2,818	5.04
Ian Clark	2,406	4.30
David Heard	2,401	4.29
James Hoyes	2,025	3.62
Denis Van Decker	1,913	3.42
Matthew Abas	1,627	2.91
Derrick Hammett	1,269	2.27
Daniel Lajeunesse	1,365	2.44

== East Gwillimbury ==
East Gwillimbury changed its council from 4 councillors elected "at large" from the town, to 6 councillors in a 3-ward system, with two councillors elected in each ward.

=== Mayor ===
Mayoral candidate	Vote	%
Virginia Hackson (X)	4,607	78.10
Franco Colavecchia	1,292	21.90

=== Ward 1 ===
Two to be elected.

Candidate	Vote	%
Loralea Carruthers	1,263	30.6
Terry E. Foster	871	21.1
Joel Kearney	560	13.5
Calum MacMillan	753	18.2
Jeremy Smith	277	6.7
Leen Spiering	411	9.9

=== Ward 2 ===
Two to be elected.

Candidate	Vote	%
Tara Roy-DiClemente (X)	891	39.6
Joe Persechini (X)	821	36.4
Aida Kostuck	541	24.0

=== Ward 3 ===
Two to be elected.

Candidate	Vote	%
Scott Crone	1,525	39.2
Cathy Morton (X)	1,169	30.1
Susan Lahey	821	21.1
Melody Somerville	372	9.6

== Georgina ==
Source for results:

=== Mayor ===
Mayoral candidate	Vote	%
Margaret Quirk (X)	5,391	60.96
Boris Godzinevski	2,353	26.61
Susan Jagminas	1,100	12.44

=== Georgina Town Council ===
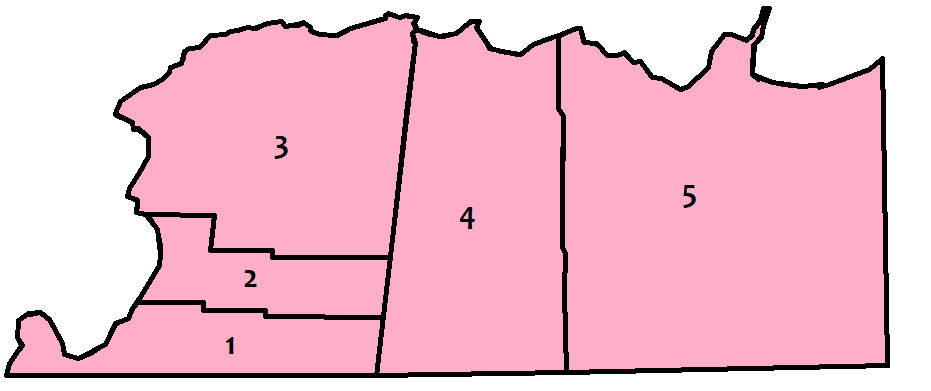
Map of Georgina's 5 wards

==== Regional Councillor ====
Council candidate	Vote	%
Robert Grossi	4,175	46.83
Naomi Davison (X)	3,454	38.74
Lee Dale	1,286	14.43

==== Ward 1 ====
Council candidate	Vote	%
Mike Waddington	991	57.99
Charlene Biggerstaff (X)	668	39.09
Glenn Wittenberg	50	2.93

==== Ward 2 ====
Council candidate	Vote	%
Dan Fellini (X)	Acclaimed	

==== Ward 3 ====
Council candidate	Vote	%
Dave Neeson (X)	Acclaimed	

==== Ward 4 ====
Council candidate	Vote	%
Frank Sebo (X)	944	44.89
Wayne Philips	865	41.13
Greta Zinck	294	13.98

==== Ward 5 ====
Council candidate	Vote	%
Dave Harding (X)	Acclaimed	

== King ==
Source for results:

=== Mayor ===
Mayoral candidate	Vote	%
Steve Pellegrini (X)	Acclaimed	

== Markham ==
List of candidates: Source for results:

2018 Markham Mayoral election
- October 22, 2018
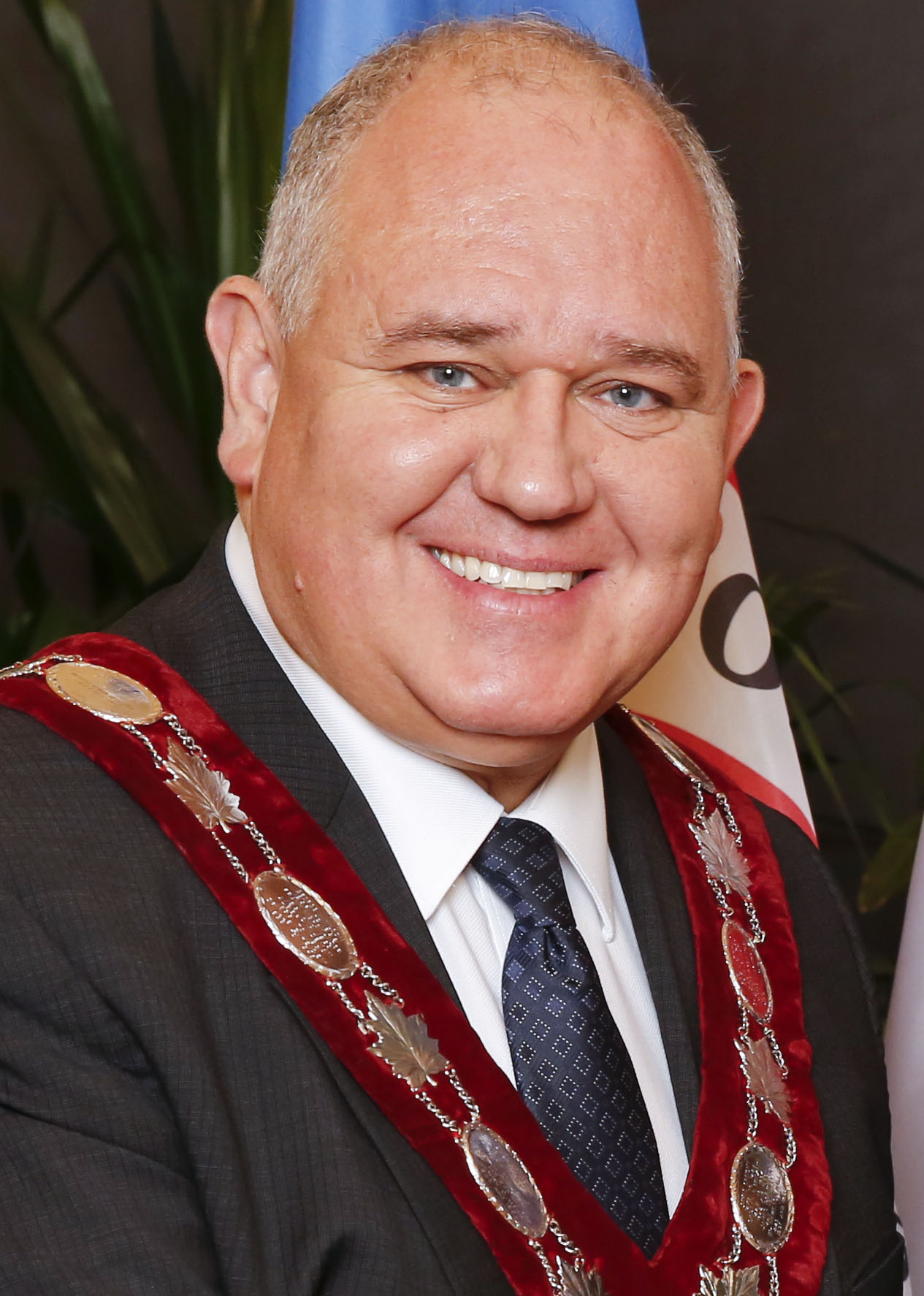
		SC
Candidate	Frank Scarpitti	Steven Chen
Popular vote	55,553	11,068
Percentage	74.94%	14.93%
Mayor before election
Frank Scarpitti
Elected mayor
Frank Scarpitti

=== Mayor ===
Mayoral candidate	Vote	%
Frank Scarpitti (X)	55,553	74.94
Steve Chen	11,068	14.93
Abdul Rahman Malik	3,379	4.56
Jawed Syed	2,294	3.09
Shan Hua Lu	1,835	2.48

=== City Council ===
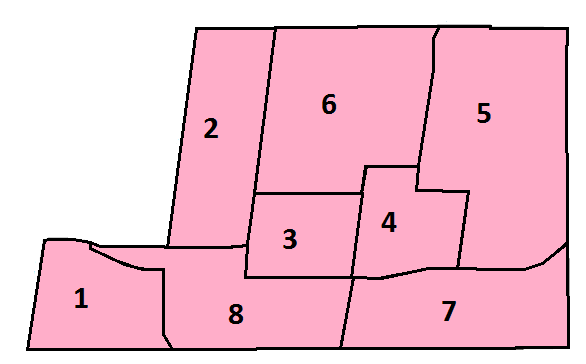
Map of Markham's 8 wards

==== Regional Councillor ====
In Markham, Regional Councillors serve on both the City Council as well as York Region Council. Electors can vote for up to four candidates on their ballots, equal to the total number that may be elected. The four winning candidates are those whom receive the highest number of votes. The candidate with the highest number of votes received also serves as Deputy Mayor.

Council candidate	Vote	%
Don Hamilton	31,952	13.48
Jack Heath (X)	31,598	13.33
Joe Li (X)	29,852	12.59
Jim Jones (X)	29,037	12.25
Nirmala Armstrong (X)	25,212	10.64
Jeffrey Lee	15,565	6.57
Ray Lai	15,296	6.45
Niran Jeyanesan	14,984	6.32
Tammy Mok	13,773	5.81
Jeff Leung	12,502	5.27
Peter Pavlovic	11,024	4.65
Aaron Madar	5,954	2.51

==== Ward 1 ====
Council candidate	Vote	%
Keith Irish	2,266	25.50
Howard Shore	1,602	18.02
Barry Nelson	1,506	16.94
Ricardo Mashregi	1,179	13.27
Peter Wong	670	7.54
Hilary Neubauer	616	6.93
Caryn Bergmann	602	6.77
Jasmine Kang	447	5.03

==== Ward 2 ====
Council candidate	Vote	%
Alan Ho (X)	3,598	47.01
Larry Lau	1,441	18.83
Charles Jiang	1,289	16.84
Tammy Armes	545	7.12
Tom Brindley	489	6.39
Bola Otaraki	292	3.81

==== Ward 3 ====
Council candidate	Vote	%
Reid McAlpine	3,287	38.69
Jennifer Carrie Wan	2,060	24.25
Ed Law	1,718	20.22
Soraya Mangal	299	3.52
Shanta Sundarason	1,132	13.32

==== Ward 4 ====
Council candidate	Vote	%
Karen Rea (X)	8,190	77.87
Ivy Lee	1,761	16.74
Shaarmina A. Rodrigo	372	3.54
Sansanwal Viradhi	194	1.84

==== Ward 5 ====
Council candidate	Vote	%
Andrew Keyes	1,266	17.00
Compass Chung	920	12.35
Sri Sivasubramaniam	734	9.86
Fred K. Wong	687	9.23
Tommy Chan	662	8.89
Marlene Mogado	646	8.67
Mo Shakir	603	8.10
Grace Woo	569	7.64
Jeremiah Vijeyaratnam	525	7.05
Scott Au	319	4.28
Sean O'Leary	277	3.72
Rajeev Narang	132	1.77
Ashok Bangia	107	1.44

==== Ward 6 ====
Council candidate	Vote	%
Amanda Yeung Collucci (X)	3,125	40.82
Shawn Wang	2,357	30.79
Gin Siow	1,074	14.03
Victor Chan	820	10.71
Arif Mahmood	280	3.66

==== Ward 7 ====
Council candidate	Vote	%
Khalid Usman (X)	3,308	24.14
Kethika Logan Kanapathi	2,635	19.23
Sundy Huang	2,079	15.17
Killi Chelliah	1,961	14.31
Malar Varatharaja	1,587	11.58
Mohammed Rahman	1,065	7.77
Sothy Sella	481	3.51
Johnson Irimpan	350	2.55
Mike Srinathan	236	1.72

==== Ward 8 ====
Council candidate	Vote	%
Isa Lee	4,616	44.00
Joseph Mohan Remisiar	2,599	24.77
Benson Lau	1,259	12.00
Howard Shen	1,124	10.71
Alex Chiu (X)	893	8.51

== Newmarket ==
Source for results:

=== Mayor ===
Mayoral candidate	Vote	%
John Taylor	14,351	73.71
Joe Wamback	4,825	24.78
Talib Ansari	294	1.51

=== Newmarket Town Council ===
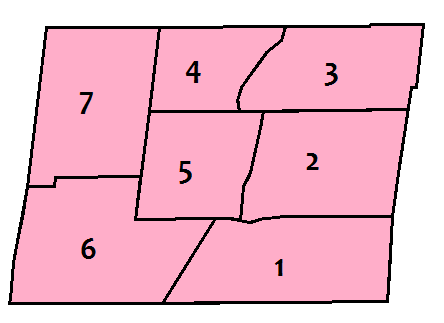
Map of Newmarket's seven wards

==== Deputy mayor and regional councillor ====
Candidate	Vote	%
Tom Vegh	8,570	44.61
Chris Emanuel	7,952	41.40
Joan Stonehocker	2,688	13.99

==== Ward 1 ====
Council candidate	Vote	%
Grace Simon	2,082	60.65
Naqi Ashan	1,014	29.54
Rohit Singh	337	9.82

==== Ward 2 ====
Council candidate	Vote	%
Victor Woodhouse	1,731	62.45
Bill Kukulewich	1,041	37.55

==== Ward 3 ====
Council candidate	Vote	%
Jane Twinney (X)	1,645	73.01
Zach Zangari	608	26.99

==== Ward 4 ====
Council candidate	Vote	%
Trevor Morrison	1,052	43.11
Melissa Williams	891	36.52
Grant Waddell	497	20.37

==== Ward 5 ====
Council candidate	Vote	%
Bob Kwapis(X)	2,201	73.20
Ron Eibel	806	26.80

==== Ward 6 ====
Council candidate	Vote	%
Kelly Broome (X)	Acclaimed	

==== Ward 7 ====
Council candidate	Vote	%
Christina Bisanz (X)	Acclaimed	

== Richmond Hill ==
Source for results:

Mayoral candidate	Vote	%
Dave Barrow (X)	23,304	76.07
Susan Korman	4,756	15.52
Abu Alam	1,238	4.04
Ali Noroozi	770	2.51
Mino Tari	567	1.85

=== Richmond Hill Town Council ===
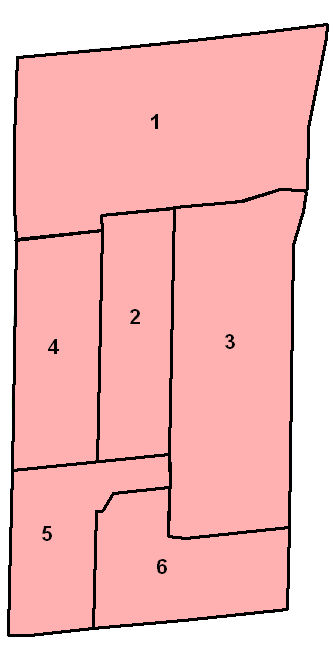
Map of Richmond Hill's six wards

==== Regional council ====
Two to be elected.

Council candidate	Vote	%
Joe DiPaola	11,758	22.35
Carmine Perrelli	11,418	21.71
Carol Chan	9,448	17.96
Jason Cherniak	8,878	16.88
Ramin Faraji	3,706	7.04
Weibo Cheng	3,523	6.70
Sabine Ho	2,605	4.95
Murtaza Bhujwalla	1,269	2.41

==== Ward 1 ====
Council candidate	Vote	%
Greg Beros (X)	2,323	43.11
Carol Davidson	1,687	31.31
Lidia Kafieh	1,167	21.66
Trifon Haitas	211	3.92

==== Ward 2 ====
Council candidate	Vote	%
Tom Muench (X)	1,827	42.07
Scott Thompson	1,076	24.78
Keith Menezes	636	14.64
Michael Aziz	520	11.97
Mike Rajbar	284	6.54

==== Ward 3 ====
Council candidate	Vote	%
Castro Liu (X)	Acclaimed	

==== Ward 4 ====
Council candidate	Vote	%
David West (X)	3,963	66.16
Bob Aurora	1,228	20.50
Michael D'Amelio	799	13.34

==== Ward 5 ====
Council candidate	Vote	%
Karen Cilevitz (X)	3,137	51.81
Nick Papa	2,247	37.11
Mahnaz Shahbazi	542	8.95
Nima Shahi	129	2.13

==== Ward 6 ====
Council candidate	Vote	%
Godwin Chan (X)	4,146	81.97
Julie Maxey	912	18.03

== Vaughan ==
Source for results:

Mayoral candidate	Vote	%
Maurizio Bevilacqua (X)	37,072	70.70
Frank Miele	13,690	26.11
Savino Quatela	1,671	3.19

=== Vaughan City Council ===
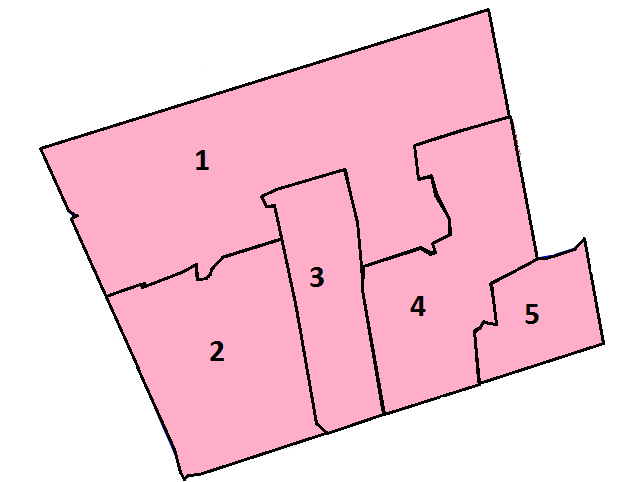
Map of Vaughan's five wards

==== Regional council ====
Three to be elected.

Council candidate	Vote	%
Mario Ferri (X)	23,323	18.27
Gino Rosati (X)	23,113	18.11
Linda D. Jackson	15,962	12.51
Eliana Di Biase	15,401	12.07
Richard T. Lorello	10,969	8.59
Sunder Singh (X)	9,252	7.25
Fred Winegust	8,745	6.85
Jacob Joel Ginsberg	7,669	6.01
Frank Scarlato	6,440	5.05
Mubarak Ahmed	3,918	3.07
Skanda Singarajah	2,845	2.23

==== Ward 1 Maple/Kleinburg ====
Council candidate	Vote	%
Marilyn Iafrate (X)	6,538	54.93
Carmine Tucci	2,564	21.54
Vince Scaramuzzo	1,126	9.46
Fitz-Roy Gordon	643	5.40
John Santoro	592	4.97
Millad Hamidkohzad	440	3.70

==== Ward 2 Woodbridge West ====
Council candidate	Vote	%
Tony Carella (X)	4,020	33.83
Nick Pinto	2,976	25.04
Adriano Volpentesta	2,909	24.48
Simone Barbieri	964	8.11
Carrie Liddy	493	4.15
Mario Di Nardo	427	3.59
Nicole Elfar-Troiano	95	0.80

==== Ward 3 Woodbridge/Vellore ====
Council candidate	Vote	%
Rosanna DeFrancesca (X)	6,220	61.31
Victor Lacaria	1,183	11.66
Mark Pulciani	1,155	11.38
Tony Lorini	1,002	9.88
Salva Gravets	219	2.16
John Yusufi	203	2.00
Tom Takacs	163	1.61

==== Ward 4 Concord/Thornhill ====
Council candidate	Vote	%
Sandra Yeung Racco (X)	2,868	49.53
Styles Q. Weinberg	1,968	33.99
Furio Liberatore	954	16.48

==== Ward 5 Thornhill ====
Council candidate	Vote	%
Alan Shefman (X)	6,769	55.54
Allan Goldstein	5,418	44.46

== Whitchurch-Stouffville ==
=== Mayor ===
Mayoral candidate	Vote	%	vote % Δ
Iain Lovatt	5,329	37.44	
Keith Acton	4,421	31.06	
Justin Altmann (X)	3,060	21.50	-11.85
Anand Daté	1,260	8.85	
Phil Bannon	162	1.14	-29.47

=== Whitchurch-Stouffville Town Council ===
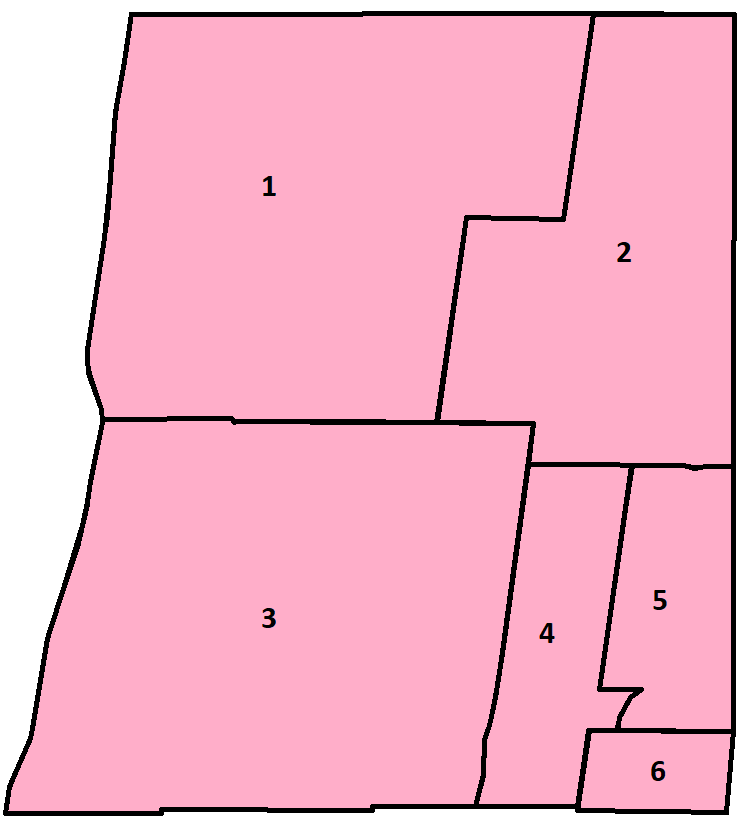
Map of Whitchurch-Stouffville's wards

==== Ward 1 ====
Council candidate	Vote	%	vote % Δ
Ken Ferdinands (X)	490	55.68	-7.14
Elizabeth Johnston	313	35.57	-1.61
Kesha Wint	77	8.75	

==== Ward 2 ====
Council candidate	Vote	%	vote % Δ
Maurice Smith (X)	1,727	71.54	-2.49
Ellen Gowland	687	28.46	

==== Ward 3 ====
Council candidate	Vote	%	vote % Δ
Hugo Kroon (X)	480	66.76	+13.08
Keith Singer	163	22.67	
Stephen Rogers	76	10.57	

==== Ward 4 ====
Council candidate	Vote	%	vote % Δ
Rick Upton (X)	1,694	56.41	+21.15
Brian Sankarsingh	678	22.58	
James Liaros	631	21.01%	+3.64

==== Ward 5 ====
Council candidate	Vote	%	vote % Δ
Richard Bartley	817	29.24	
Michael Humphreys	736	26.34	-12.68
Rose Pizzulo	488	17.47	
Jenny Altmann	378	13.53	
Garland Zheng	271	9.70	
Steve Downs	104	3.72	

==== Ward 6 ====
Council candidate	Vote	%	vote % Δ
Sue Sherban	1,649	38.46	
Rob Hargrave (X)	1,514	35.31%	-2.44
Bryan Stott	1,125	26.24%	14.37

== York Region District School Board ==
=== Trustee - Area 1 (Vaughan Ward 1 & 2) ===
Candidate	Vote	%
Anna DeBartolo	4,437	45.3
Miranda Goldberg	1,200	12.2
Charline Grant	2,161	22.0
Vivek Mehta	580	5.9
Sabrina Painda	561	5.7
Mandeep Rai	666	6.8
Azadeh Yeganeh	196	2.0

Anna DeBartolo submitted her resignation from the Trustee position on January 9, 2019, citing personal reasons.

=== Trustee - Area 2 (Vaughan Ward 3 & 4) ===
Candidate	Vote	%
Linda Aversa	2,348	29.0
Sam Sanath Barua	478	5.9
Matthew Forbes	1,723	21.3
Justin Rangooni	1,178	14.5
Elizabeth Sinclair	2,376	29.3

=== Trustee - Area 3 (Markham Ward 1 & Vaughan Ward 5) ===
Candidate	Vote	%
David Sherman	3,663	38.7
Aviva Polonsky	3,409	36.0
Todd Silverman	954	10.1
Brenndon Goodman	726	7.7
Simon Strelchik	716	7.6
Sahar Adaskar	436	4.6

=== Trustee - East Gwillimbury and Whitchurch-Stouffville ===
Candidate	Vote	%
Lena Singh		
Elizabeth Terrell-Tracey		

=== Trustee - Richmond Hill (Wards 1, 2 and 4) ===
Candidate	Vote	%
Simone Cui		
Corrie McBain		
Jonathan Nadler		

== York Catholic District School Board ==
=== Trustee - Area 1 (Vaughan Ward 1) ===
Candidate	Vote	%
Rose Cantisano	2738	47.1
Teresa Ciaravella	2527	43.5
Teresa Calvi	548	9.4

=== Trustee - Area 2 (Vaughan Ward 2) ===
Candidate	Vote	%
Dino Giuliani	2418	37.1
Michaela Barbieri	1838	28.2
Enza Torchia	1473	22.6
Daniele DiNardo	574	8.8
Justin Darmanin	208	3.2

=== Trustee - Area 3 (Vaughan Ward 3) ===
Candidate	Vote	%
Joe Giancola		
Maria Marchese		
Donna Rosati		

=== Trustee - Area 4 (Vaughan Ward 4 & 5) ===
Candidate	Vote	%
Jennifer Wigston		

== Le Conseil scolaire Viamonde ==
=== Trustee - York Region ===
Candidate	Vote	%
François Guérin		
Karine Ricard		

== Conseil scolaire catholique MonAvenir ==
=== Trustee - York Region ===
Candidate	Vote	%
Kathleen Beal		
Maxime Papillon		
