= William F. Bell =

Mayor of Richmond Hill, Ontario
- In office 1988–2006
- Preceded by: Al Duffy
- Succeeded by: Dave Barrow

Ward 3 councillor - Richmond Hill, Ontario
- In office 1981–1988
- Preceded by: David Amos
- Succeeded by: David Cohen

Personal details
- Born: William Fraser Bell; November 28, 1938 Toronto, Ontario
- Died: July 28, 2013 (aged 74) Richmond Hill, Ontario
- Spouse: Jackie Chapman
- Children: 2
- Education: University of Toronto

William Fraser Bell BA (November 10, 1938 – July 28, 2013) was former mayor of Richmond Hill, Ontario from 1988 to 2006, and Ward 3 councillor from 1981 to 1988.

Bell was born in Toronto, Ontario to William R. and Audrey Bell and grew up in North York, Ontario. After graduating for Earl Haig Secondary School Bell studied political science at the University of Toronto. Bell later moved to Richmond Hill, Ontario and before politics Bell was a buyer and purchasing director in the food services industry.

Bell died in Richmond Hill, Ontario on July 29, 2013 and survived by wife Jackie, daughters Kate and Julie.
