= David West (Canadian politician) =

Canadian politician

His Worship David West
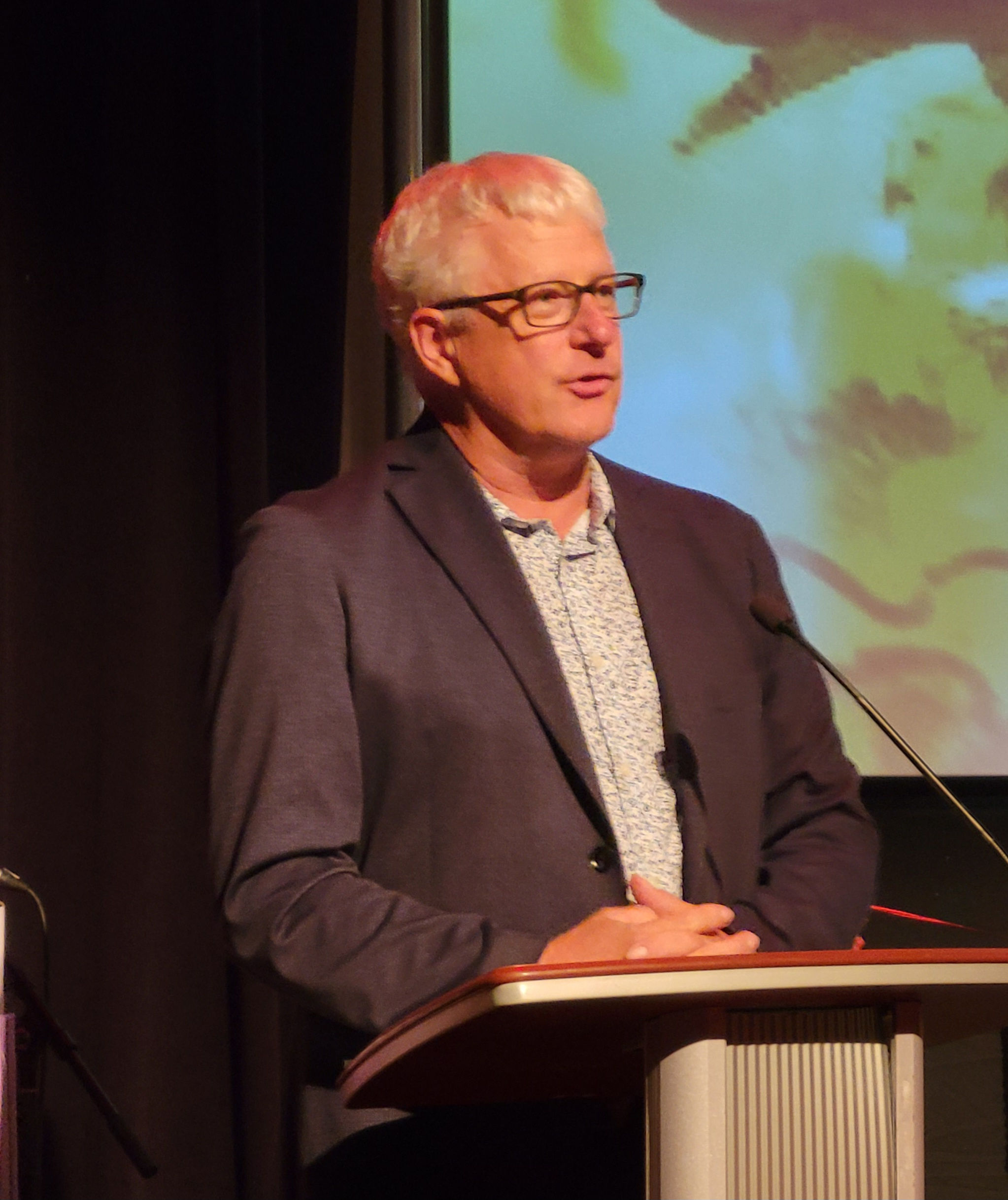
- West in 2024

Mayor of Richmond Hill
- Incumbent
- Assumed office January 25, 2022
- Preceded by: Dave Barrow

Richmond Hill Town Councillor
- In office December 4, 2013 – January 25, 2022
- Preceded by: Lynn Foster
- Succeeded by: Raika Sheppard
- Constituency: Ward 4

Personal details
- Party: Independent
- Spouse: Michelle
- Occupation: Businessman; photographer

David West is a Canadian politician. He has been serving as the mayor of Richmond Hill since January 2022. As mayor, he also sits on the York Regional Council.

== Early life ==
West's father Ian, was born in Rydal Bank, Ontario. West attended Langstaff Secondary School in Richmond Hill, which is where he met his wife. He then received a Bachelor of Education degree from the University of Toronto. He returned to Richmond Hill c. 1990.

Before entering politics, West owned a photography business, called West Photo Inc. He was named Photographer of the Year for all Ontario in 1997.

== Career ==
West was appointed to Richmond Hill's council in 2013 to fill a vacancy, replacing Lynn Foster in Ward 4, who had moved to Connecticut. He was chosen among 36 candidates who applied for the job. There was controversy with his appointment, with some calling the process 'rigged'. West was selected after a 5–3 council vote, defeating former Conservative candidate Joe DiPaola on the final ballot. West had the backing of mayor Dave Barrow. DiPaola claimed the vote was not fair, as councillors made up their minds before the vote.

He was elected to a full term in the office in 2014, defeating Angel Freedman by over 1,800 votes. He was re-elected in 2018, defeating Bob Aurora by over 2,700 votes. In 2019, West introduced a proposal to begin council meetings with a land acknowledgement, but the motion was defeated. DiPaola, now a member of town council opposed the measure, calling it "treading down a course of political correctness".

Following the resignation of Dave Barrow, West was elected as mayor of Richmond Hill in a by-election on January 24, 2022. He defeated Ward 6 councillor Godwin Chan, regional councillor Carmine Perrelli and DiPaola, who had been acting mayor, winning over 13,000 votes in the process. He beat his nearest rival, Chan by nearly 3,000 votes, and won 34% of the vote. He ran on his vision for the city, involving growth management, a sustainable and healthy environment, celebration of diversity, effective and efficient service delivery, council collaboration, public safety, and a flourishing arts and culture foundation. After his election, he stated that one of the most important issues he would have to tackle was the city's official plan review process. His short first term in office oversaw a dysfunctional council, known for chaotic council meetings and accusations of bullying.

West was re-elected in the October 2022 municipal elections in a landslide, winning 70% of the vote, defeating regional councillor Carmine Perrelli by over 18,000 votes. Perrelli had been one of the councillors accused of troubling behaviour while on council. After the election, which resulted in five new members of council, West indicated his priorities would be keeping taxes low, community safety and affordable housing.

In 2023, after the Ontario government announced that West would be one of 26 mayors given "strong mayor" powers under the Strong Mayors, Building Homes Act, West pledged that he would be 'prudent' with exercising his new powers. Also in 2023, West came out in opposition to amalgamating the municipalities of York Region, which includes Richmond Hill.
