= Dave Barrow =

Canadian politician (1947–2022)

Mayor of Richmond Hill
- In office 2006–2021
- Preceded by: William F. Bell
- Succeeded by: David West

Richmond Hill Ward 4 Councillor
- In office 1978–1985
- Succeeded by: Gail Blackburn

York Region Councillor for Richmond Hill
- In office 1997–2006
- Succeeded by: Vito Spatafora

Personal details
- Born: David Charles Barrow; May 7, 1947; Richmond Hill, Ontario, Canada
- Died: September 22, 2022 (aged 75); Richmond Hill, Ontario, Canada
- Occupation: Politician

David Charles Barrow (May 7, 1947 – September 22, 2022) was a Canadian politician. He served as the mayor of Richmond Hill from 2006 to 2021 and previously served on its city council.

== Early life ==
Barrow was born in Richmond Hill, Ontario, on May 7, 1947, to Elgin "Tubby" and Mary Barrow. He completed his primary education at McConaghy Public School, before attending Richmond Hill High School in his hometown. He then studied at Ryerson Polytechnical Institute.

== Political career ==
Barrow was first elected to political office in 1978, representing Ward 4 in the Richmond Hill city council. He served in that capacity until 1985, when he went back to his family's business – an insurance brokerage company established by his father in 1964 – following the death of the elder Barrow. After just over a decade outside politics, he made a comeback in 1997 when he was elected to the York Regional Council. Barrow voted against giving himself and fellow councillors a salary increase of 54 per cent in 1998, stating that it was "not sending a very good message" to municipal staff and the public. He later voted in favour of having certain travel and conference expenses incurred by councillors' spouses covered at the expense of taxpayers in October that same year. He also advocated for the preservation of the Oak Ridges Moraine, and was opposed to the provincial government's proposal to construct housing on the landform. During the 2003 municipal election, Barrow ran on a platform of alleviating traffic congestion in the area and starting a road safety-watch program. He became deputy mayor that year, and was acting mayor when incumbent William F. Bell underwent hip surgery in February 2004.

Barrow was elected mayor of Richmond Hill in November 2006, following Bell's retirement. He was succeeded as regional councillor by Vito Spatafora. Although Barrow called for the town hall to be relocated back to the city's downtown – as part of an overall plan to revive the core of Richmond Hill – he later walked back on the plan, reluctant to devote a significant amount of the municipality's reserve funds into a single project. Barrow was subsequently re-elected in 2010, 2014, and 2018. In late 2017, he declined an offer from the provincial government to host a cannabis retail location in Richmond Hill, a decision that received unanimous support from the city council. Barrow took a medical leave of absence starting in February 2021. Although he intended to resume his duties as mayor by the fall that year, he ultimately resigned from the position in September 2021, and was succeeded by David West after a by-election.

== Personal life ==
Barrow was married to Tomye Anne until his death. Together, they had two children: Greg and Jennifer.

Barrow died on the morning of September 22, 2022, in Richmond Hill. He was diagnosed with dementia and a stroke prior to his death at the age of 75.

== Awards and honours ==
Barrow was the recipient of the Queen Elizabeth II Diamond Jubilee Medal (2012). In September 2022, a week before his death, the Richmond Hill council dedicated the Dave Barrow Square, located east of the city's Central Library, in his honour. A portion of the trail in the Oak Ridges Corridor Conservation Reserve was also renamed the David Barrow Trail that same month.
