= List of city and town halls in Canada =

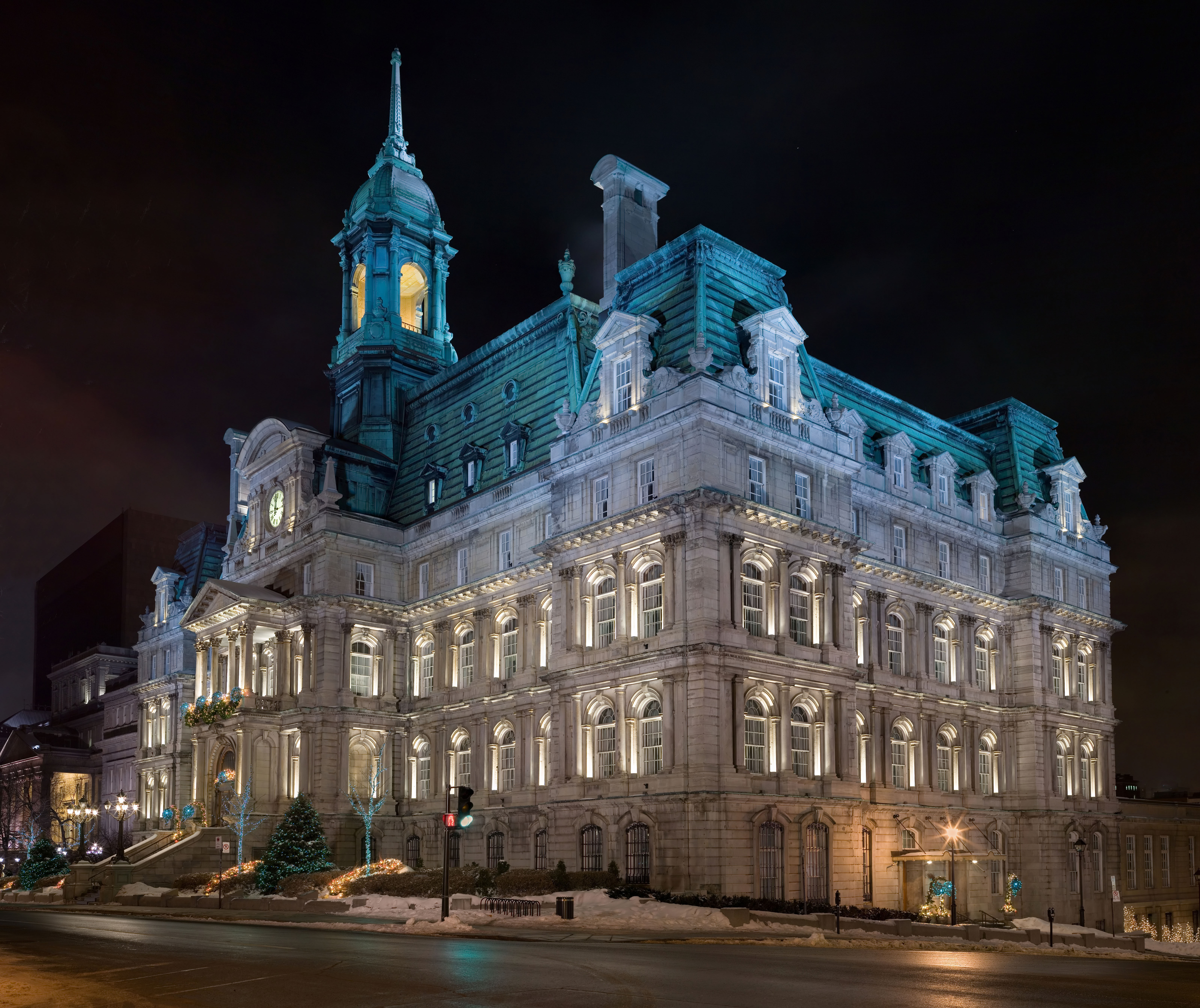
Montreal City Hall, January 2006

== Alberta ==
- Calgary City Hall
- Edmonton City Hall

== British Columbia ==
- Coquitlam City Hall
- Vancouver City Hall
- Victoria City Hall

== Manitoba ==
- Winnipeg City Hall

== New Brunswick ==
- Bathurst City Hall
- Campbellton City Hall
- Dieppe City Hall
- Edmundston City Hall
- Fredericton City Hall
- Miramichi City Hall
- Moncton City Hall
- Saint John City Hall

== Newfoundland and Labrador ==
- St. John's City Hall

== Northwest Territories ==
- Yellowknife City Hall

== Nova Scotia ==
- Halifax City Hall

== Nunavut ==
- Iqaluit City Hall

== Ontario ==
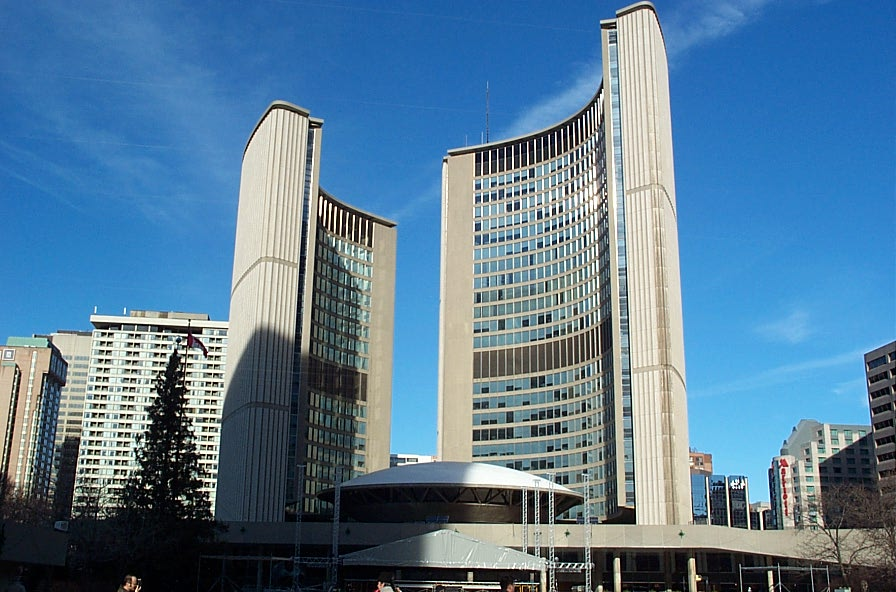
Toronto City Hall

- Brampton - Brampton City Hall
- Brantford - Brantford City Hall
- Cornwall - Cornwall City Hall
- Greater Sudbury - Tom Davies Square
- Hamilton - Hamilton City Hall
- Kingston - Kingston City Hall
- Kitchener - Kitchener City Hall
- Markham - Markham Civic Centre
- Peterborough - Peterborough City Hall
- Mississauga - Mississauga Civic Centre
- North Bay City Hall
- Sault Ste. Marie City Hall
- Ottawa - Ottawa City Hall (First City Hall (Ottawa), Second City Hall (Ottawa), Old City Hall (Ottawa), Transportation Building (Ottawa))
- Stouffville, Ontario - old Stouffville Town Hall
- Timmins - Timmins City Hall
- Toronto - Toronto City Hall (Old City Hall (Toronto), Etobicoke Civic Centre, North York Civic Centre, Scarborough Civic Centre, St. Lawrence Market, Yorkville Town Hall)
- Ingersoll - Ingersoll Town Hall

== Prince Edward Island ==
- Charlottetown City Hall

== Quebec ==
- Bonsecours Market
- City Hall of Quebec City
- Montreal City Hall
- Rivière-du-Loup Town Hall
- Roberval Town Hall
- Saguenay City Hall
- Saint-Hyacinthe City Hall
- Shawinigan City Hall
- Sherbrooke City Hall
- Trois-Rivières City Hall
- Westmount City Hall

== Saskatchewan ==
- Regina City Hall
- Saskatoon City Hall

== Yukon ==
- Whitehorse City Hall

== See also ==
- List of city and town halls
