= 2006 Markham municipal election =

- October 2006
- Turnout: 58,409

The 2006 Markham municipal election was held in Markham, Ontario on November 13, 2006. The election was held as required by law for municipalities in the Province of Ontario. Markham has a dual-tier government system where constituents elect ward councillors to town council and regional councillors to regional council and a mayor elected to both town council and regional council.

== Election ==
The election was held to elect a mayor, 4 regional councillors, 8 ward councillors and 8 school board trustees. The election was held in conjugation with other municipal elections across Ontario on this date.

There were 4 candidates running for mayor, 9 candidates running for regional council, 41 candidates running for ward council and 19 candidates running for various school boards. The election saw a turnout of 58,409 constituents out of the total 261,573 constituents living Markham, thus, a 22.33% turnout rate.

== Results ==
=== Mayor ===
Candidate	Vote	%
Frank Scarpitti	48,462	82.97
Partap Dua	4,912	8.41
Stephen Kotyck	3,195	5.47
Sam Orrico	1,840	3.15

Notes: Orrico was charged with threatening Scarpitti by York Regional Police in relation with this election.

=== Regional Council ===
Candidate	Vote	%
Carl Bodnar	6,962	3.99
Elagu Elaguppillai	16,246	9.30
Jack Heath (X)	29,037	16.63
Jim Jones (X)	29,514	16.90
Gordon Landon (X)	23,996	13.74
Joe Li	18,020	10.32
Arnel Scott	7,938	4.55
Khalid Usman	17,432	9.98
Tony C. Wong (X)	25,491	14.60

Notes: 4 councillors and the mayor, representing Markham, were elected into regional council.

=== Ward 1 ===
Candidate	Vote
Jason Buchholz	88
Valerie Burke (X)	3,434
Stan Daurio	2,316

=== Ward 2 ===
Candidate	Vote
Peter Michael Pavlovic	699
Erin Shapero (X)	4,355
Howard Shern	216

=== Ward 3 ===
Candidate	Vote
John Cabrelli	2,013
Spaso Jovcevski	426
Michael Skinner	216
Kenny Szeto	575
George Treheles	718
Joseph Virgilio (X)	3,327
Ivan Q. Yao	450

=== Ward 4 ===
Candidate	Vote
Tony Boseovski	651
Alan Ho	1,723
Ivy Lam	731
Carolina Moretti (X)	3,049
Nirmala Persaud-Armstrong	1,431
Stephen Tonner	96
Jim Treacy	830
Brian Weller	185

=== Ward 5 ===
Candidate	Vote
Bala Balasubramaniam	567
James Bush	237
Colin J. Campbell	3,758
John Webster (X)	4,311

=== Ward 6 ===
Candidate	Vote
Wafik Abadir	460
Dan Horchik (X)	3,151
Jim Kwan	1,871

=== Ward 7 ===
Candidate	Vote
Tessa Benn-Ireland	1,569
William Jeyaveeran	775
Logan Kanapathi (X)	3,088
Manpreet Minhas	343
Yahya Qureshi	1,224
Mohammed Rahman	1,272
Jeffry Ruo	595
Syed Zaidi	340

=== Ward 8 ===
Candidate	Vote
Alex Chiu (X)	3,431
Jeremy Choi	340
Surinder S. Lamba	1,302
Ivy Lee	1533
Millicent Radway	275
Thaya Rajah	1,452

=== York Catholic District School Board ===
==== Wards 1, 2, 3 and 6 ====
Candidate	Vote
Carol Cotton (X)	1,983
Michael Viscounti	1,547

==== Wards 4, 5, 7 and 8 ====
Candidate	Vote
Frank Alexander	2,243
Fen Chang	864
Joseph Kurian	596
Marlene Mogaudo (X)	2,390

=== York Region District School Board ===
==== Wards 1 and 2 ====
Candidate	Vote
Jay Badiani	753
Susan Geller (X)	5,223
Stan Korolnek	2,122

==== Wards 3 and 6 ====
Candidate	Vote
Marion Menzies	813
Elizabeth Richardson (X)	3,008
Gordon To	2,546
Gary Unitas	2,891

==== Wards 4 and 5 ====
Candidate	Vote
Bill Crothers (X)	ACCLAIMED

==== Wards 7 and 8 ====
Candidate	Vote
Susie Gotha	4,197
Neethan Shan	8,230

=== Conseil Scolaire De District Du Centre-Sud-Ouest ===
Candidate	Vote
René Laurin (X)	64
Paula Varvaro	38

=== Conseil Scolaire De District Catholique Centre-Sud ===
Candidate	Vote
Yves Levesque (X)	ACCLAIMED

== See also ==
- 2010 Markham municipal election
