= Markham—Thornhill =

Markham—Thornhill may refer to:

- Markham—Thornhill (federal electoral district)
- Markham—Thornhill (provincial electoral district)
