= Ottawa City Hall =

City hall of Ottawa, Ontario, Canada

Coordinates: 45.421016°N 75.690018°W

- Hôtel de ville d'Ottawa
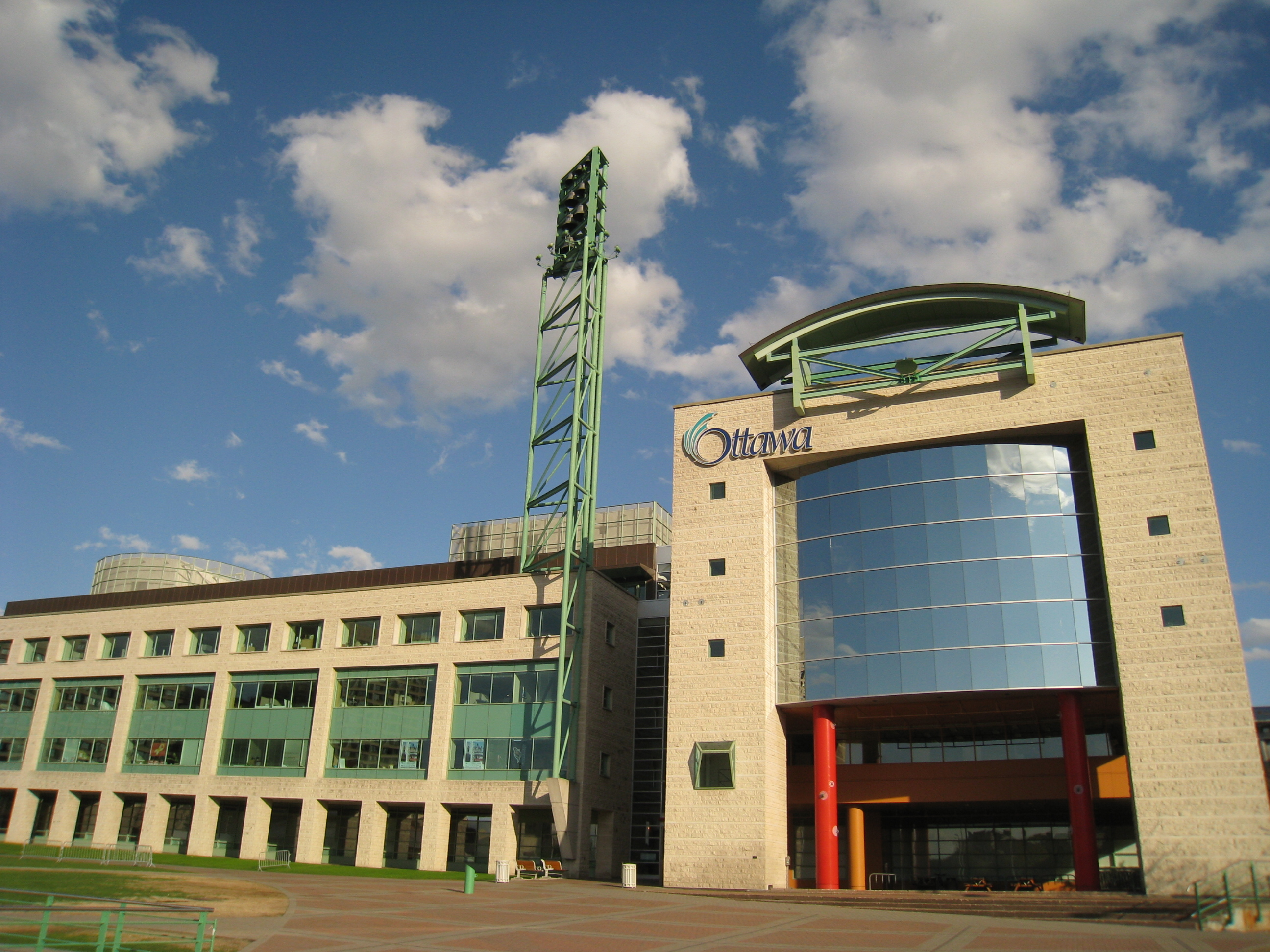
- Modern section of Ottawa City Hall facing Laurier Avenue
- Interactive map of the Ottawa City Hall area

General information
- Type: City hall
- Architectural style: Modern
- Location: 110 Laurier Avenue West, Ottawa, Ontario, Canada
- Opened: 1990

Design and construction
- Other designers: Raymond Moriyama

The current Ottawa City Hall (French: Hôtel de ville d'Ottawa) is the city hall of Ottawa, Ontario, Canada. The downtown complex consists of two connected buildings: a modern wing located on Laurier Avenue and a 19th-century heritage wing located on Elgin Street. Although City Hall has frontage on two major streets, the main entrance is on Laurier Avenue, and the municipal address is 110 Laurier Avenue West.

== Main building ==
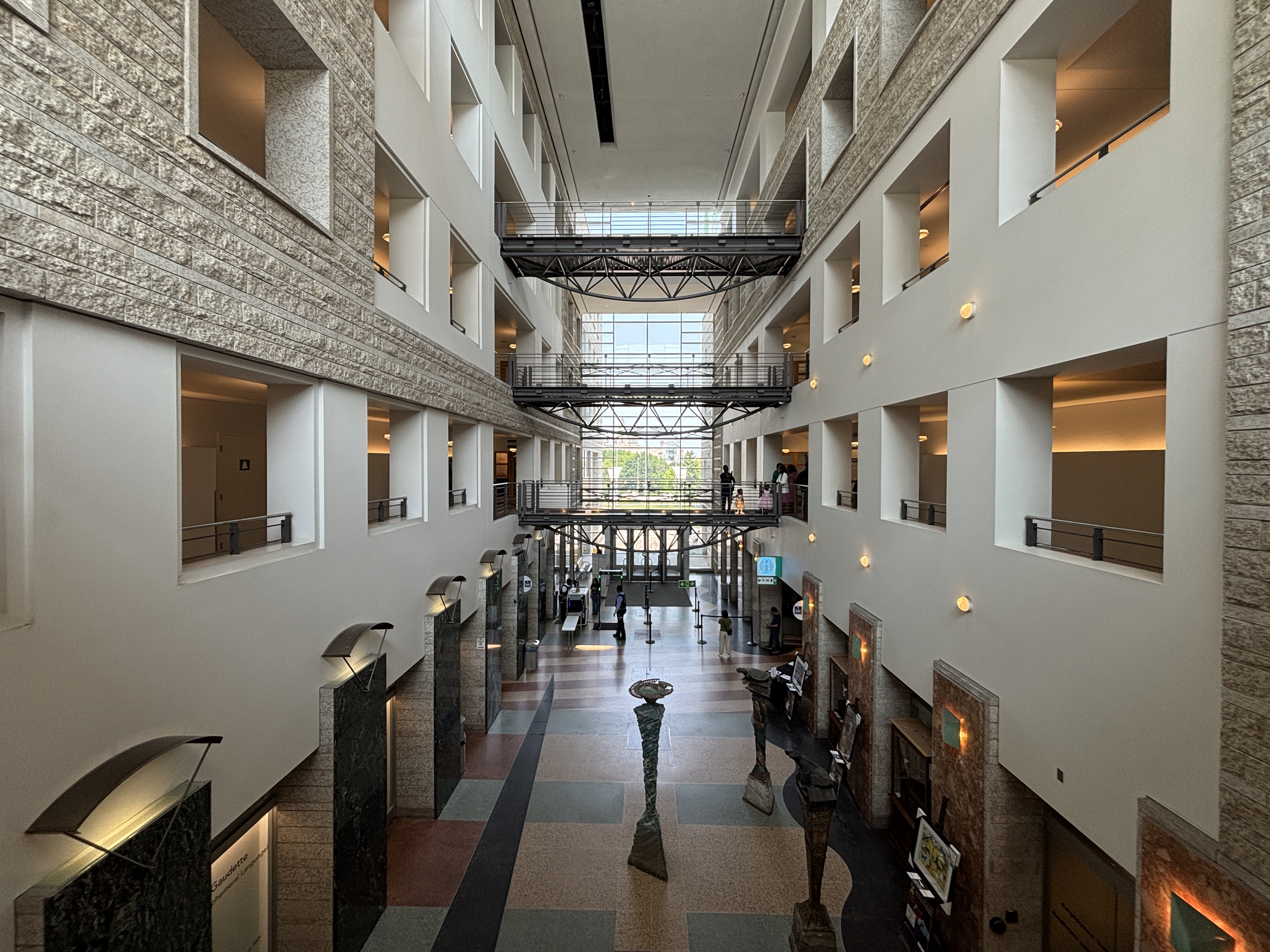
Interior of the city hall

The modern wing, which serves as the main section of City Hall, was designed by Raymond Moriyama and built in 1990 as the headquarters of the former Regional Municipality of Ottawa-Carleton. It is located between the Cartier Square Drill Hall and the Ottawa Court House. This section of City Hall contains the Council chamber (known as Andrew Haydon Hall), a large atrium and a number of offices and public services. The front of the building is marked by a large open plaza that faces Confederation Park across Laurier Avenue. The plaza is home to concerts, festivals, and other community events. The grounds have a number of features, including a sound sculpture, fountain and artificial ice-skating pad.

The site had originally been the parade ground for the Drill Hall. During the Second World War, a complex of structures was erected to house military staff. These buildings were meant to be temporary, but they remained in place for several decades. They were eventually demolished and the City Hall and courthouse were built on the site. The Regional Headquarters building was chosen as the new City Hall upon the amalgamation of the Region and its constituent municipalities in 2001, largely due to its central location. The architecturally acclaimed John G. Diefenbaker Building, located to the east of downtown, was subsequently sold to the federal government.

== Heritage Building ==
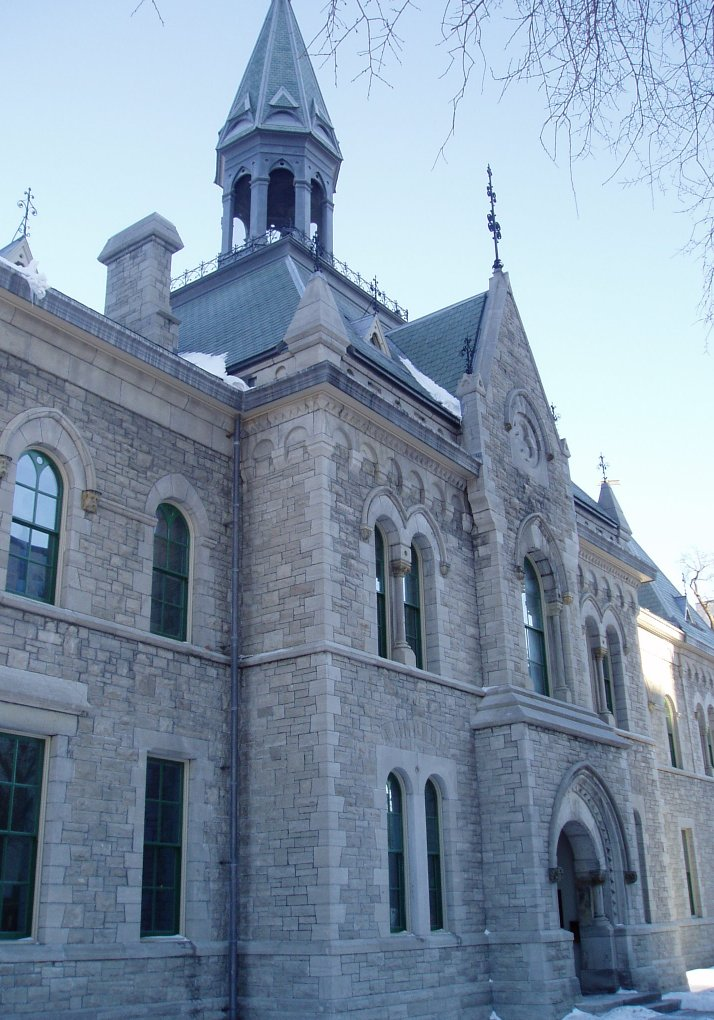
Heritage Building section of Ottawa City Hall facing Elgin Street

South of the courthouse on Elgin Street stands the old Ottawa Normal School, built in 1875, and which now serves as the "Heritage Building" section of City Hall. Connected to the modern wing, the Heritage Building contains the offices of the Mayor and members of Council (the mayor's office overlooks Elgin Street), as well as a number of offices and committee rooms (including one committee room located in the former gymnasium of the Normal School).

The Heritage Building was designated a National Historic Site of Canada in 1974.

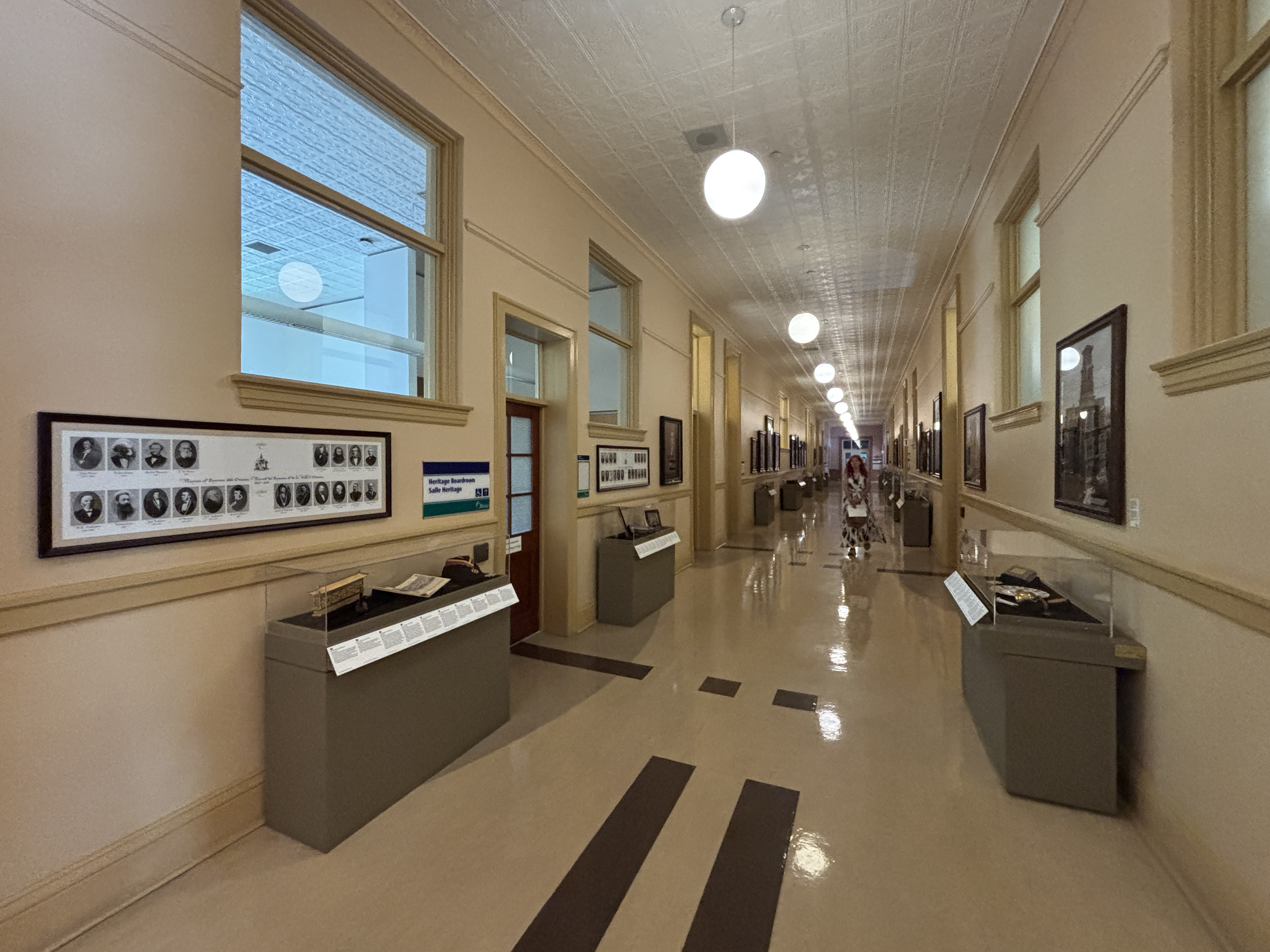
Building Access

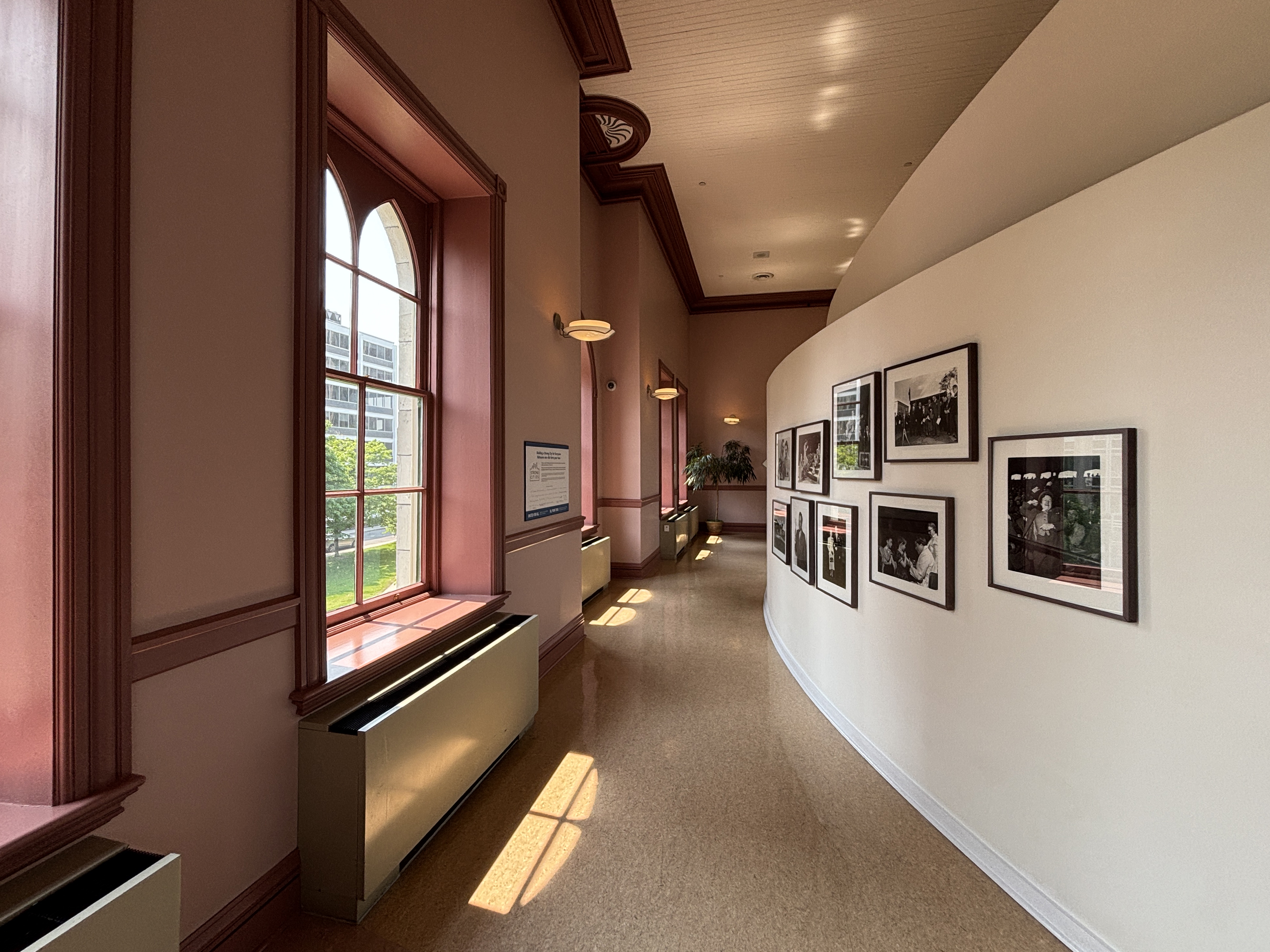
Gallery

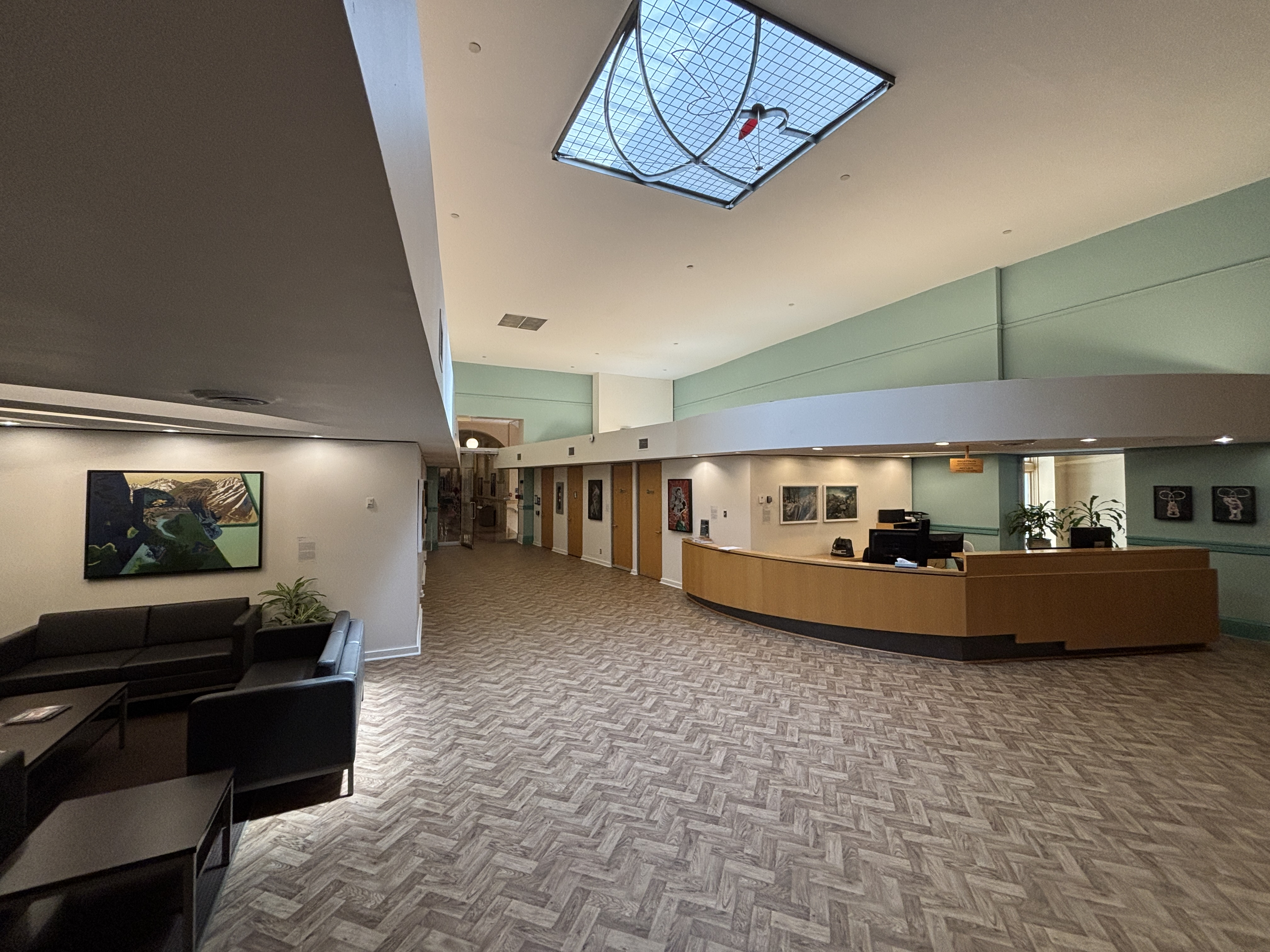
Mayor Office reception

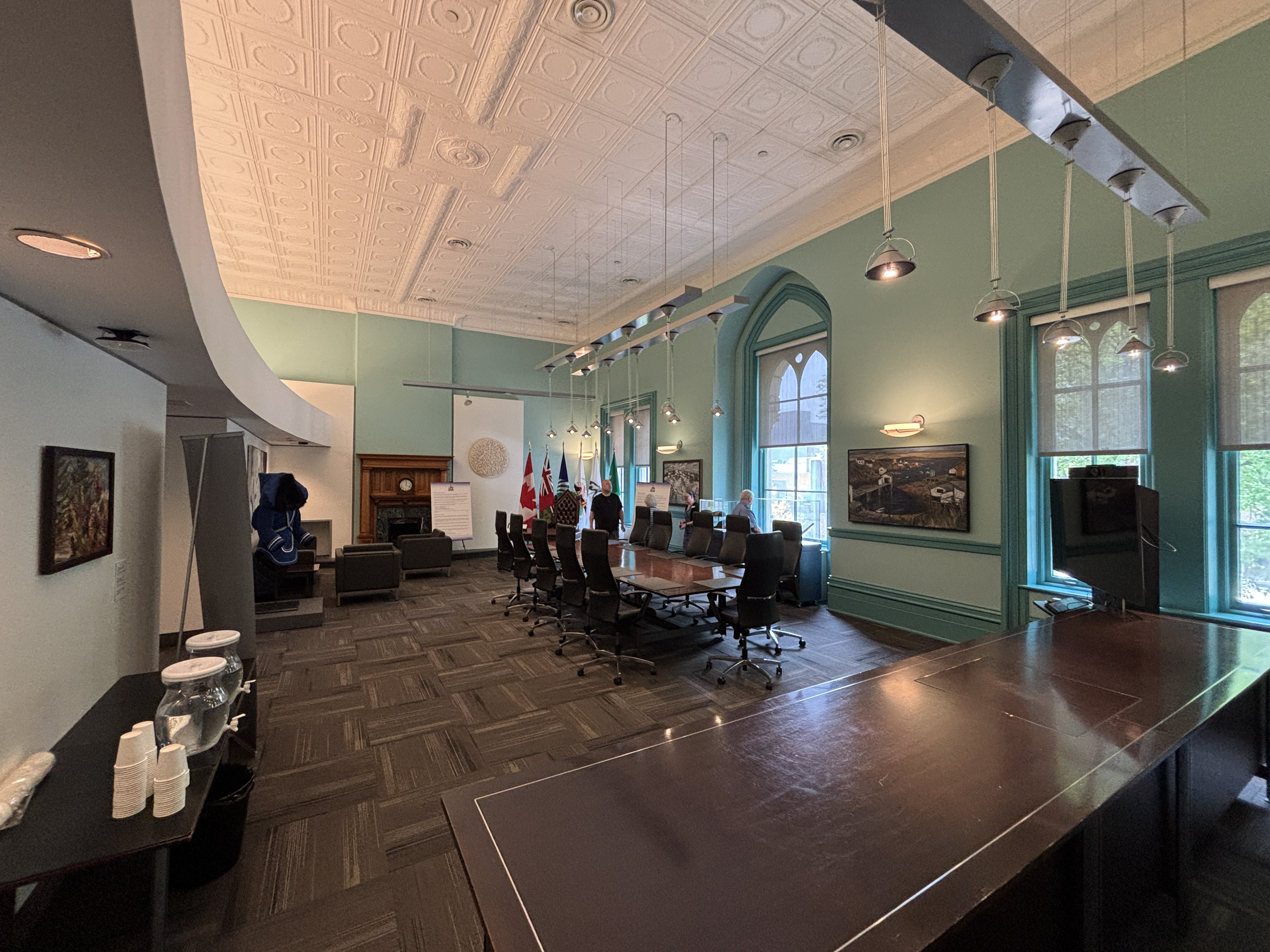
Mayor Office

== Public art ==
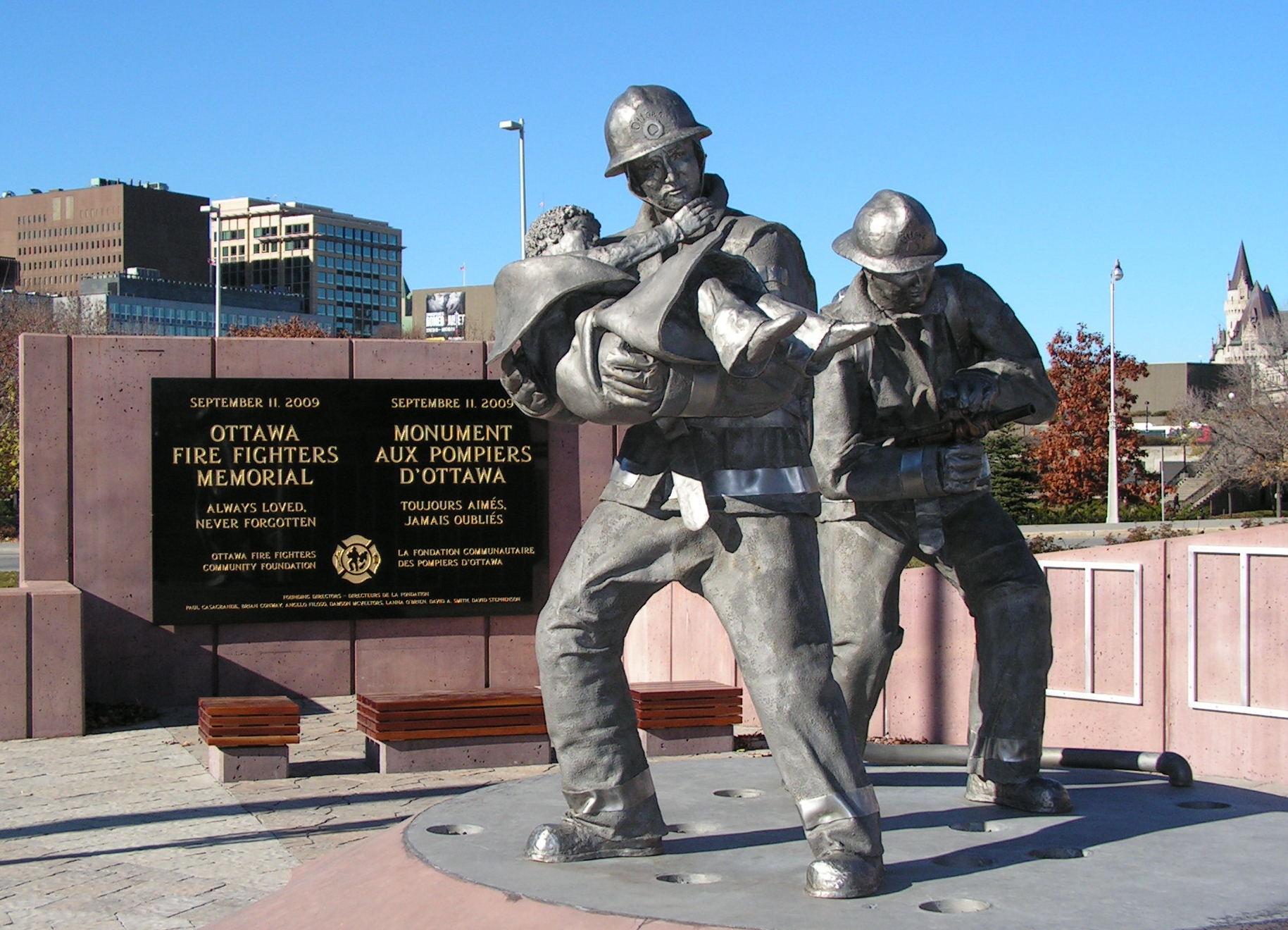
Ottawa Fire Fighters Memorial

Throughout the buildings of Ottawa's City Hall, there are various pieces of art that were commissioned specifically for the location. Some of the following pieces can currently be found there:

- The Mayor's Desk and Chair in the council chambers by Randy Kerr
- Family Portrait by Stephen Brathwaite
- Structure by Stephen Brathwaite
- V.I.P. by Michael Bussiere
- Sachi's Isochron by Warren Carther
- Fable by Trevor Gould
- Nautilus by Paula Murray
- The Lost Child by David Piqtoukun
- On Top of the World by Jim Thomson
- The Living Room by URBAN KEIOS

== Veterans' Grove ==
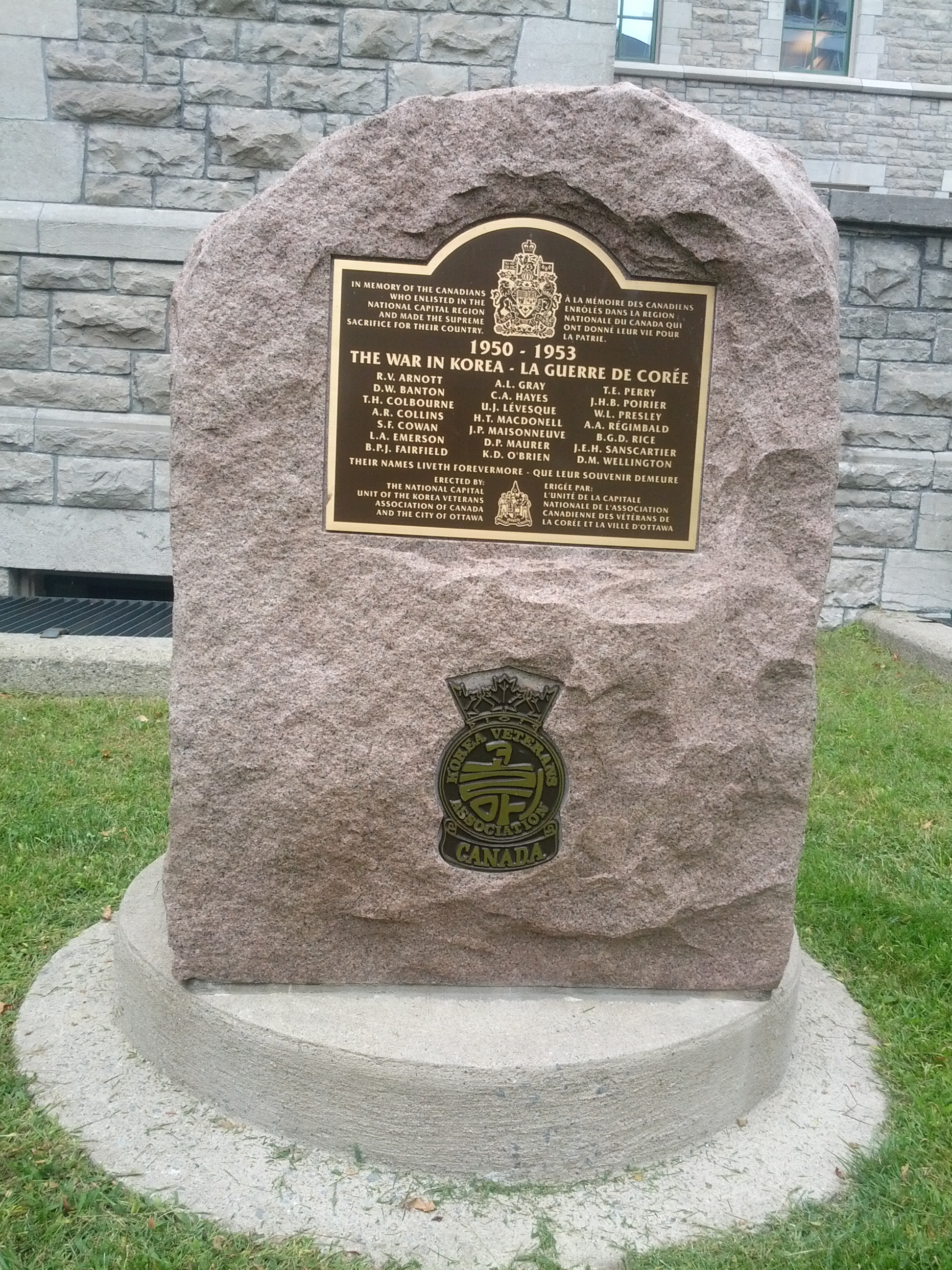
Korean War Memorial in Veterans' Grove beside Ottawa City Hall

On 5 November 1998, an area located beside Ottawa City Hall was named Veterans' Grove by then-Mayor Bob Chiarelli in honour of War Veterans from the Ottawa-Carleton Region. A pink granite memorial dedicated to the memory of Canadians who had enlisted in Ottawa for service with the Canadian Army Special Force and members of Canada's Regular Forces who made the supreme sacrifice during the War in Korea was moved to its current location in Veterans' Grove in 1998. It was originally unveiled on 27 July 1994 at the site of the old City Hall on Sussex Drive.

== Sens Rink of Dreams ==
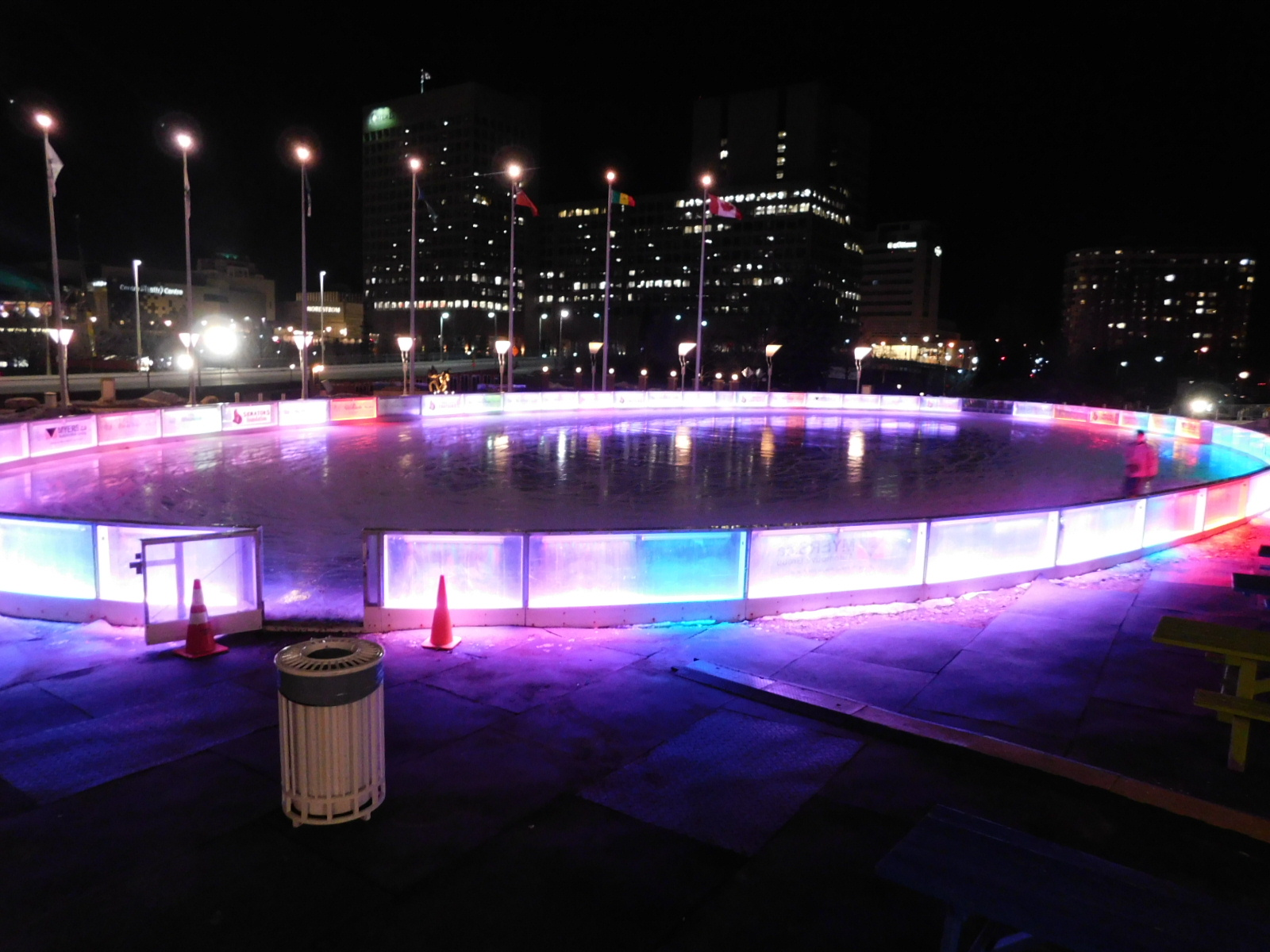
The Rink of Dreams at night

Since 2013, the Ottawa Senators Foundation has funded a 12,500-square-foot (1,160 m^{2}) ice rink in front of Ottawa City Hall. The rink is open from December to March, weather permitting. It is surrounded by changing LED lighting mounted in the boards for night skating. It also features outdoor speakers, picnic tables, a changing hut, skate rental concession and a BeaverTails trailer.

== See also ==
The current building is only one of several structures that have served as Ottawa's city hall:

- 1849-1877: The First City Hall was a converted market at Queen and Albert Streets, donated by Nicholas Sparks
- 1877-1931: The Second City Hall, a more modern sturdy stone structure, was built next to the first site, it was destroyed by fire in 1931
- 1931-1958: The Transportation Building served an extended period as Ottawa's temporary city hall
- 1958-2000: What is now known as the John G. Diefenbaker Building on Green Island opened in 1958 and was heavily expanded in the late 1990s.
