= Markham Village Town Hall =

Heritage site in Ontario, Canada

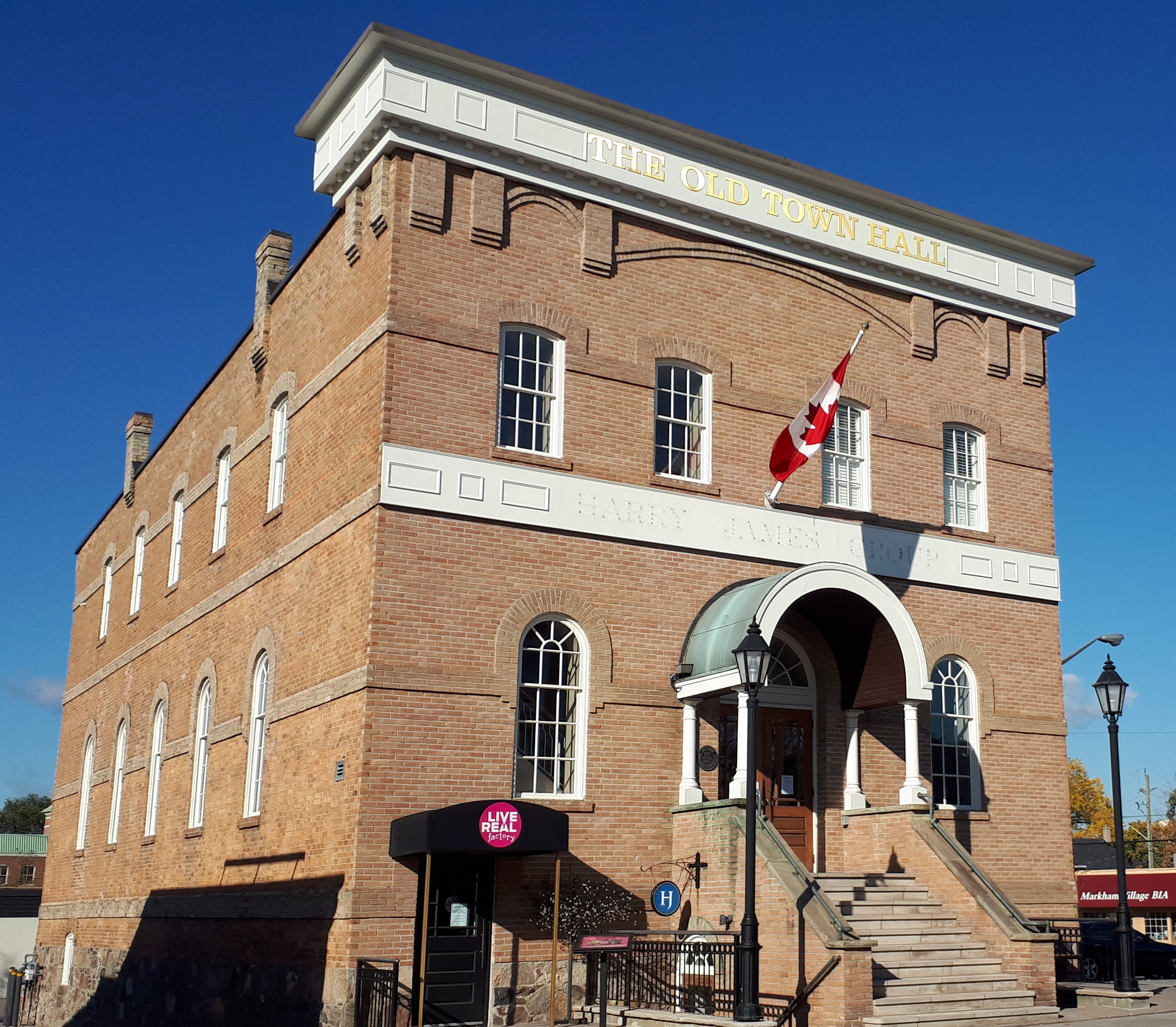

- Location within Southern Ontario
- Former names: Old Town Hall, Towne Cinema

General information
- Architectural style: Italianate architecture
- Location: 96 Main Street North, Markham, Ontario, Canada
- Coordinates: 43°52′39″N 79°15′40″W
- Elevation: 179 metres (587 ft)
- Completed: 1881
- Inaugurated: 1882-01-16
- Client: Town of Markham

Design and construction
- Main contractor: John Wilson
- Designations: Heritage site under the Ontario Heritage Act

Markham Village Town Hall, also called Old Town Hall, is a building at 96 Main Street North in Markham, Ontario, Canada, and was the home to Markham Town Council from 1882 until it moved to a location on Woodbine Avenue. It was built in 1882 by local builder John Wilson in an Italianate architecture style, with brick, from a local brickyard, laid by mason Joseph Sampson.

Besides council chambers the building was home to a local jail, and to Masonic and Oddfellow Lodges.

The building was sold in 1946, was a cinema until 1980 until it was reconstructed to its original facade and modified internal structure by Tony Baggio CPEng. As of March 2016, it housed business offices and was one of many historically preserved buildings on Main Street Markham. It was designated a heritage site under the Ontario Heritage Act on April 23, 1985. The designation lists the following the features (excerpted from reference):

- two storey coral brick exterior
- shed roof
- entrance with semi-circular fanlight and voussoirs of yellow brick
- yellow brick detailing in voussoirs and joining string courses
- decorated cornice
- heavy timber truss supporting second storey and roof
- round headed windows
- reconstructed brick chimneys

== See also ==
- Markham Civic Centre
