= First City Hall (Ottawa) =

First city hall of Ottawa, Canada

Coordinates: 45.4229°N 75.6945°W

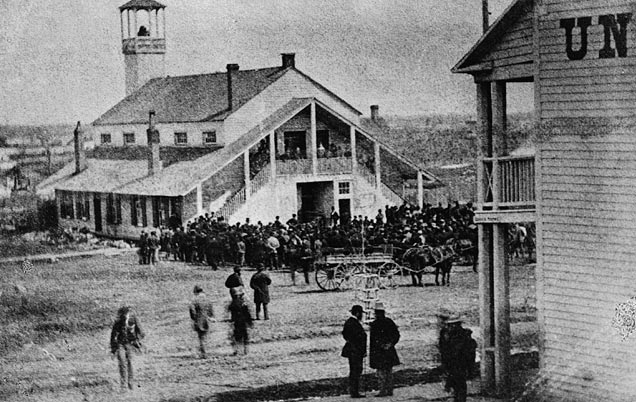
The first city hall in a converted market

The first city hall for the city of Ottawa, Ontario, was built in 1849 on Elgin Street between Queen and Albert Streets.

Originally known as the West Ward Market Building on Elgin Street, the building was one of two markets in Ottawa, then called Bytown. The market did not last, facing competition from the Byward Market in the Lower Town and closed in that same year.

The site was then donated to Bytown by town councillor Nicholas Sparks in 1849 for conversion to a town hall. The first meeting of the Ottawa Horticultural Society was held here on March 9, 1854.

Inadequate to the needs of the growing community, it was replaced in 1877 by the Second City Hall, built next to this site. Today the site is the National Arts Centre.

The wooden building, with a bell tower, had two floors with the first floor as a fire hall/police station and upper floor as town offices.

== See also ==
- Second City Hall (Ottawa), city hall from 1877 to 1931
- Transportation Building (Ottawa), 1931 the building became Ottawa's temporary city hall
- John G. Diefenbaker Building served as Ottawa's city hall from 1958 to 2000
- Ottawa City Hall, city hall since 2001
