= Logan Kanapathi =

Canadian politician

Logan Kanapathi MPP
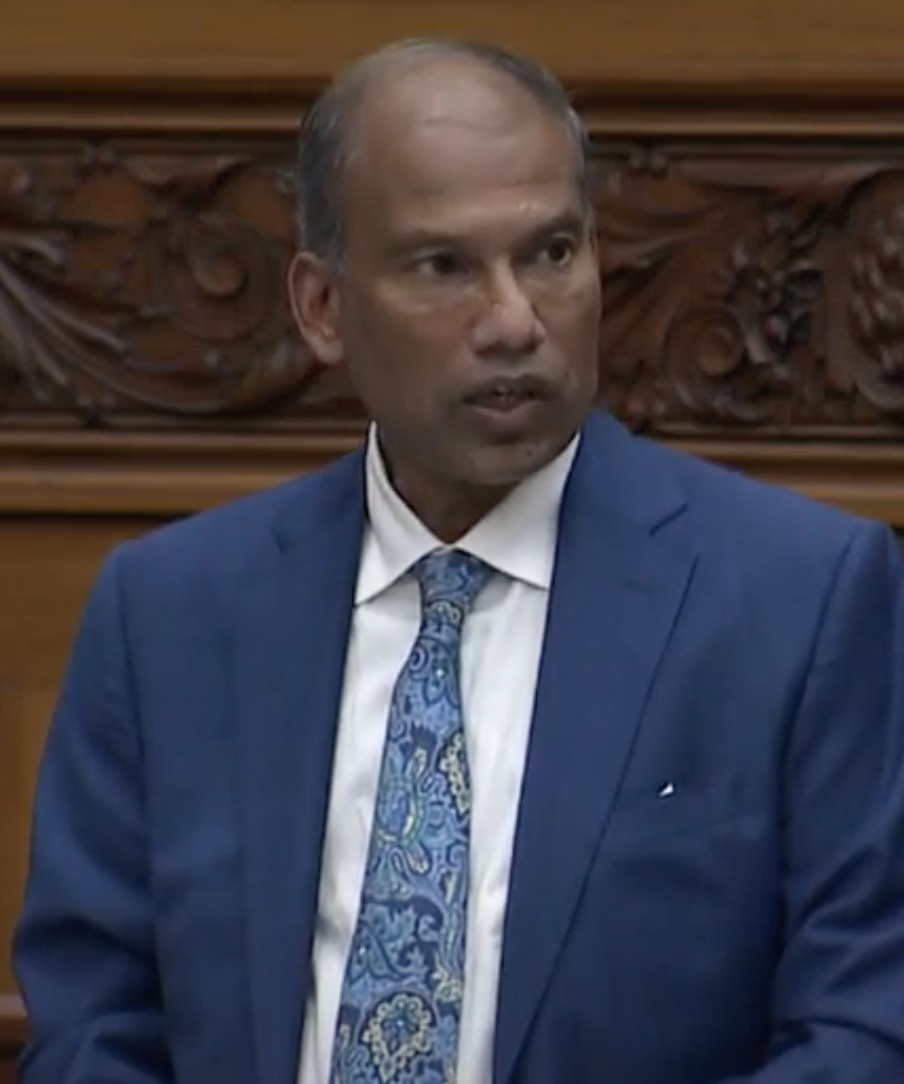

Member of the Ontario Provincial Parliament for Markham—Thornhill
- Incumbent
- Assumed office June 7, 2018
- Preceded by: Riding established

Markham City Councillor
- In office 2006–2018
- Preceded by: Khalid Usman
- Succeeded by: Khalid Usman
- Constituency: Ward 7

Personal details
- Born: Jaffna, Sri Lanka
- Party: Progressive Conservative
- Education: University of Jaffna (BA)
- Profession: Small Business Owner
- Ethnicity: Sri Lankan Tamil

Logan Kanapathi MPP is a Canadian politician who was elected to the Legislative Assembly of Ontario during the 2018 general election. He represents the riding of Markham—Thornhill, and is a member of the Progressive Conservative Party of Ontario. He was first elected as a Markham city councillor for Ward 7 in the 2006 Markham municipal election and re-elected as the Ward 7 Councillor in both the 2010 Markham municipal election and the 2014 Markham municipal election.

== Electoral record ==
=== Provincial ===
2025 Ontario general election: Markham—Thornhill
Party	Candidate	Votes	%	±%
Progressive Conservative	Logan Kanapathi	14,287	53.58	+4.76
Liberal	Nirmala Armstrong	10,580	39.68	+2.18
New Democratic	Paul Sahbaz	1,176	4.41	−4.64
Green	Shane O'Brien	623	2.34	−0.21
Total valid votes		26,666	100.0	
Total rejected, unmarked, and declined ballots		185		
Turnout		26,851	36.9	−2.8
Eligible voters		72,291		
Progressive Conservative hold		Swing		+1.3
Source(s): "VOTE TOTALS FROM OFFICIAL TABULATION" (PDF). Elections Ontario. 2025.

2022 Ontario general election: Markham—Thornhill
Party	Candidate	Votes	%	±%
Progressive Conservative	Logan Kanapathi	14,011	48.82	−1.63
Liberal	Sandra Tam	10,763	37.50	+13.11
New Democratic	Matthew Henriques	2,597	9.05	−12.28
Green	Zane Abulail	733	2.55	+0.27
New Blue	Jennifer Gleason	376	1.31	
Centrist	Mansoor Qureshi	219	0.76	
Total valid votes		28,699	100.0	
Total rejected, unmarked, and declined ballots		121		
Turnout		28,820	39.68	
Eligible voters		72,345		
Progressive Conservative hold		Swing		−7.37
Source(s): "Summary of Valid Votes Cast for Each Candidate" (PDF). Elections Ontario. 2022. Archived from the original on 2023-05-18.; "Statistical Summary by Electoral District" (PDF). Elections Ontario. 2022. Archived from the original on 2023-05-21.

2018 Ontario general election: Markham—Thornhill
Party	Candidate	Votes	%	±%
Progressive Conservative	Logan Kanapathi	18,943	50.45	+15.60
Liberal	Juanita Nathan	9,160	24.40	–26.97
New Democratic	Cindy Hackelberg	8,010	21.33	+11.14
Green	Caryn Bergmann	859	2.29	–0.04
Libertarian	David Nadler	408	1.09	N/A
Independent	Jeff Kuah	168	0.45	N/A
Total valid votes		37,548	100.0	
Progressive Conservative notional gain from Liberal		Swing		+21.29
Source: Elections Ontario

=== Municipal ===
2014 Markham election Ward 7 (Armadale—Box Grove)
Councillor candidate	Votes	Vote %
Logan Kanapathi	5,673	48.25
Khalid Usman	3,539	30.10
Shusmita Sharma	1,308	11.12
Sothy Sella	1,078	9.17
Vasu Murugesu	160	1.36
Vote total: 11,758

2010 Markham election Ward 7 (Armadale—Box Grove)
Councillor candidate	Votes	Vote %
Logan Kanapathi	4,027	36.21
Debbie Wong	3,168	28.49
Adnan Khan	1,173	10.55
Raman Virk	1,100	9.89
Mohammed Rahman	1,050	9.44
Inderjit Basra	393	3.53
Senthil Varatharajah	210	1.89
Vote total: 11,121

2006 Markham election Ward 7 (Armadale—Box Grove)
Councillor candidate	Votes	Vote %
Logan Kanapathi	3,088	33.54
Tessa Benn-Ireland	1,569	17.04
Mohammed Rahman	1,272	13.82
Yahya Qureshi	1,224	13.30
William Jeyaveeran	775	8.41
Jeffry Ruo	595	6.46
Manpreet Minhas	343	3.72
Syed Zaidi	340	3.69
Vote total: 9,206
