= Juanita Nathan =

Canadian politician

Juanita Nathan MP

Member of Parliament for Pickering—Brooklin
- Incumbent
- Assumed office April 28, 2025
- Preceded by: Jennifer O'Connell

Markham City Councillor
- In office November 15, 2022 – May 14, 2025
- Preceded by: Khalid Usman
- Succeeded by: Nimisha Patel
- Constituency: Ward 7

Personal details
- Party: Liberal
- Education: Brock University
- Website: juanitanathan.liberal.ca

Juanita Nathan MP is a Canadian politician from the Liberal Party of Canada. She was elected Member of Parliament for Pickering—Brooklin in the 2025 Canadian federal election.

== Early life & education ==
Nathan has a BA from Brock University in Psychology and an MA in Tamil Literature and Linguistics from Anamalai University.

== Political career ==
Nathan ran for her party's nomination in the 2017 Markham—Thornhill federal by-election but withdrew in protest of the Liberal Party's handling of the nomination process.

She was chair and current York Region District School Board (YRDSB) trustee. She was a city councillor for Markham City Council from November 15, 2022 to May 14, 2025.

== Personal life ==
She is of Tamil Canadian heritage.

== Electoral record ==
2025 Canadian federal election: Pickering—Brooklin
Party	Candidate	Votes	%	±%
Liberal	Juanita Nathan	38,578	54.16	+6.00
Conservative	Alicia Vianga	29,320	41.16	+6.90
New Democratic	Jamie Nye	1,838	2.58	-10.90
People's	Lisa Robinson	639	0.90	-2.95
Green	Andrea Wood	535	0.75	+0.50
Centrist	Zainab Rana	322	0.45	N/A
Total valid votes		71,232	99.48	
Total rejected ballots		371	0.52	-0.00
Turnout		71,603	70.40	+10.01
Eligible voters		101,706		
Liberal notional hold		Swing		-0.45
Source: Elections Canada

2022 Markham election, Ward 7
Council candidate	Vote	%
Juanita Nathan	5,388	47.75
Nimisha Patel	2,648	23.47
Shahzad Habib	1,955	17.33
Neetu Gupta	1,292	11.45

2018 Ontario general election: Markham—Thornhill
Party	Candidate	Votes	%	±%
Progressive Conservative	Logan Kanapathi	18,943	50.45	+15.60
Liberal	Juanita Nathan	9,160	24.40	–26.97
New Democratic	Cindy Hackelberg	8,010	21.33	+11.14
Green	Caryn Bergmann	859	2.29	–0.04
Libertarian	David Nadler	408	1.09	N/A
Independent	Jeff Kuah	168	0.45	N/A
Total valid votes		37,548	100.0	
Progressive Conservative notional gain from Liberal		Swing		+21.29
Source: Elections Ontario
