= Trevor Gould =

Canadian contemporary artist (born 1951)

- Born: 1951 (age 74–75); Johannesburg, South Africa
- Website: www.trevorgould.ca

Trevor Gould (born 1951 in Johannesburg) is a Canadian contemporary artist known for his sculptural and conceptual artworks.

== Life ==
Trevor Gould was born in 1951 Johannesburg, South Africa. He studied at the University of South Africa and the Johannesburg College of Art. He immigrated to Canada in 1980, where he earned a master's degree in art from Carleton University in 1987. Gould is based in Montreal, Quebec, where he is a professor of sculpture at Concordia University.

== Work ==
Gould's work often involves the representation human, animal and anthropomorphic figures.

== Exhibitions ==
Gould exhibited in the 1995 Johannesburg Biennale.

== Collections ==
Gould's sculptures are included in several major museum collections, including the National Gallery of Canada, the Musée d'art contemporain de Montréal, the Musée national des beaux-arts du Québec and the Museum of Contemporary Art in Krakow.
