= Second City Hall (Ottawa) =

Second city hall of Ottawa, Canada

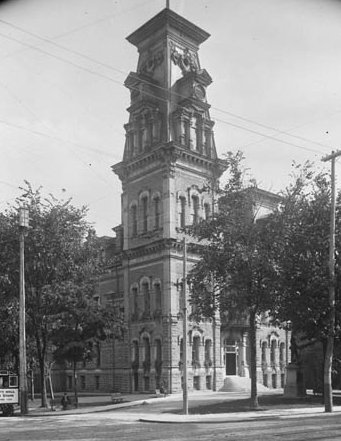
Ottawa's second City Hall

Ottawa, Ontario's second city hall was built in 1877 on Elgin Street between Queen and Albert Streets and next to Ottawa's First City Hall, built in 1848.

Built by architects Horsey and Sheard of Ottawa, the Second Empire French and Italian Style had one tall tower and three smaller ones. The building used Gloucester Blue Limestone and Ohio sandstone.

The second city hall lasted until a fire destroyed it in 1931. The next permanent city hall was not built until 1958. In the interim the municipal government was housed at the Transportation Building.

== See also ==
- First City Hall (Ottawa), city hall from 1849 to 1877
- John G. Diefenbaker Building served as Ottawa's city hall from 1958 to 2000
- Ottawa City Hall, city hall since 2001
