= Markham Civic Centre =

City hall in Ontario, Canada

Coordinates: 43.8566°N 79.3369°W

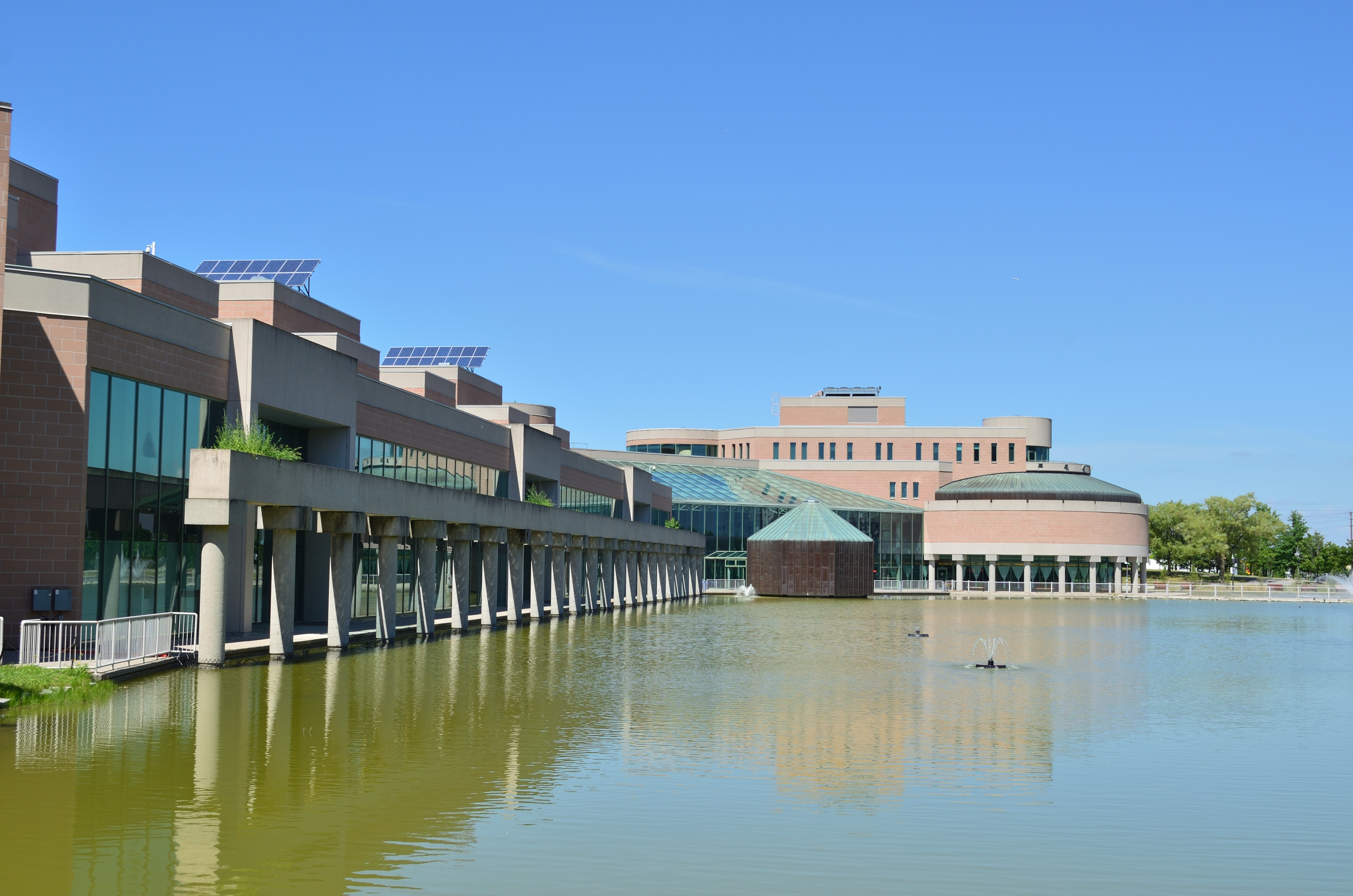
Markham Civic Centre

The Markham Civic Centre is the city hall of the city of Markham, Ontario. The brick and glass Civic Centre was designed by architect Arthur Erickson with Richard Stevens Architects Limited and was opened on May 25, 1990. The entrances, except for the great hall entrance, are named after communities in Markham (Unionville, Milliken, Thornhill). The building is adjacent to an 11.5-hectare park with a large pond reflecting the south façade.

== Building structure ==
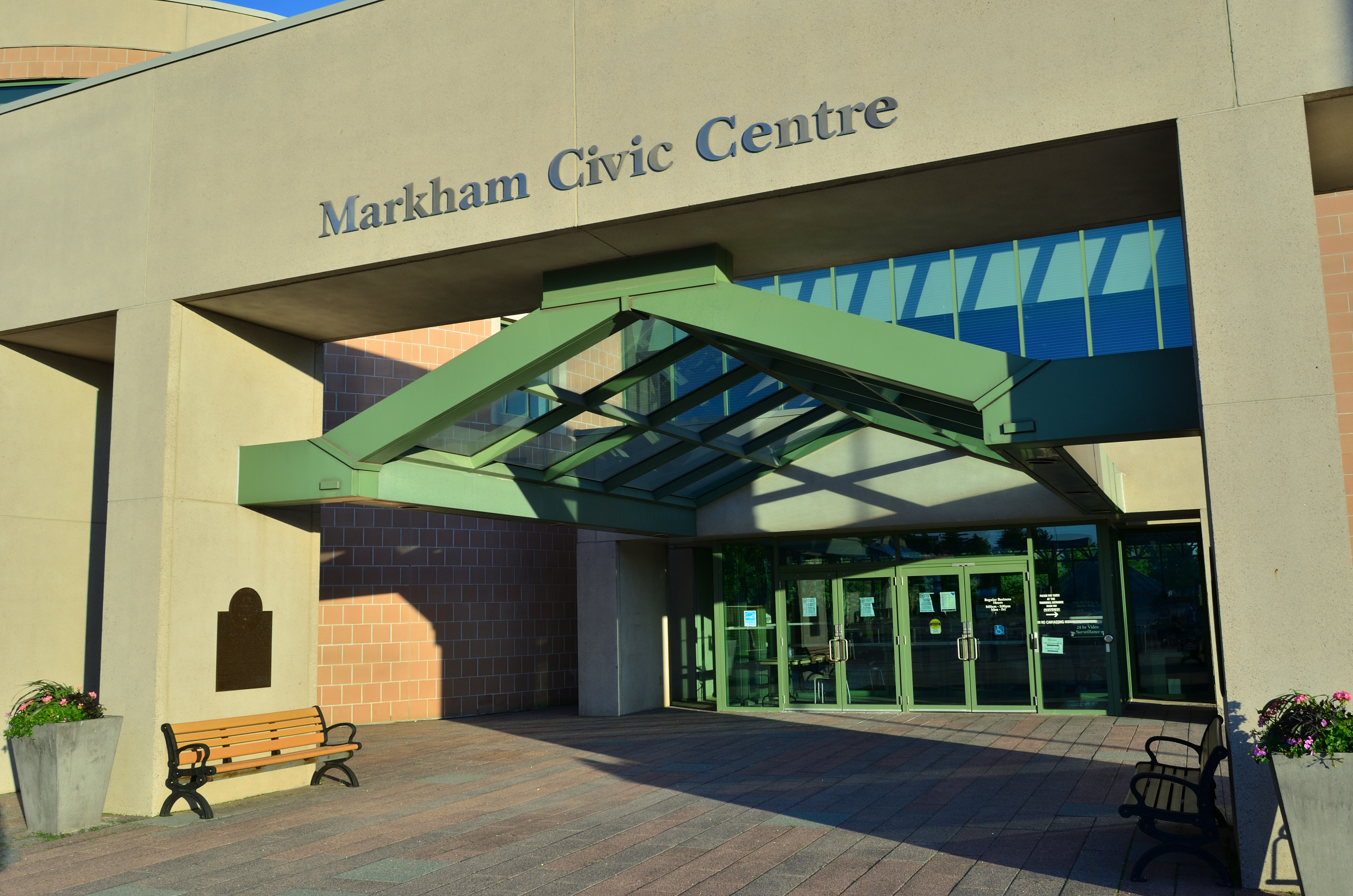
Markham Civic Centre main entrance

The three storey complex is home to

- Markham City Council chambers - Rotunda
- wedding chapel annex
- mayor and councillor offices
- city offices
- public lobby
- winter garden
- executive wing
- council chambers
- committee rooms
- council library and archives

A reflecting pond is located on the south side of the building alongside a 26,000 square foot skating rink - the largest outdoor refrigerated skating rink in the GTA, and operated in the winter months. The skating rink was constructed and officially opened in December 2011. Located next to the civic centre is the Markham Theatre and Unionville High School.

The Civic Centre is a functional building providing office space and a number of public spaces for events in the Great Hall and Lower Atrium. The split level of the Great Hall comes with a two-storey glass front viewing the reflecting pond and wedding chapel.

The Council Chambers is situated in the rotunda on the northmost side of the building. The public gallery has a capacity of about 200 people.

== Bids and winning design ==
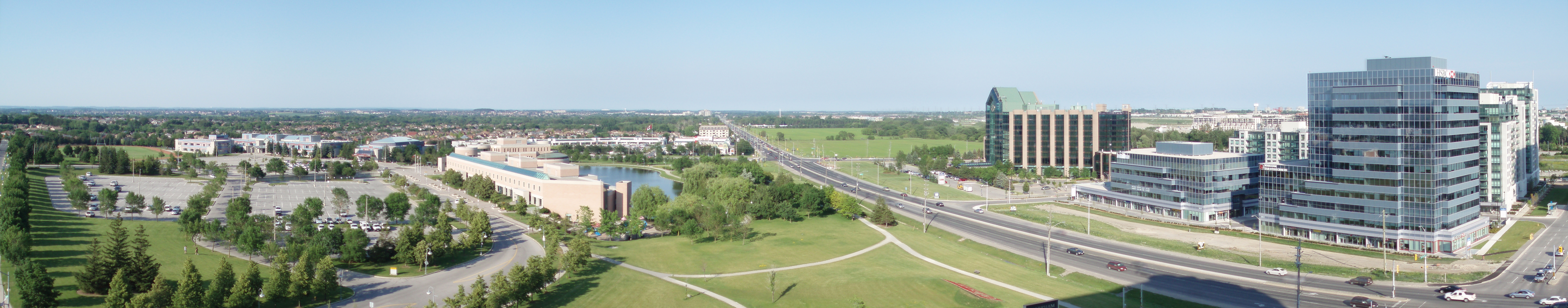
Aero view of the Markham Civic Centre

Three architect firms were shortlisted to submitted designs in 1986 for the then Markham Municipal Centre, including Raymond Moriyama Erickson and Barton Myers Associates, but the final design was awarded to Erickson.

Erickson's original design was slightly different, but the Town intervened to keep costs at budget ($14.4 million and $5.2 million for landscaping)

When the building was about to begin construction, Erickson's Toronto office faced financial difficulties.

== Sculptures ==
There is a single piece of art work located to the east side of the Town Centre. The art work is a skeletal town hall theme with a bell attached.

== Markham Civic Centre Ice Rink ==
Located on south side of the building and open during winter, it is an artificial surface rink. During the summer the rink is used as a large water fountain.

== Previous Town Halls 1862-1990 ==
While location of town meeting from 1850 to 1862 are not known, below is a list of some places Markham Town Council have sat:

- Markham Wesleyan Methodist (now St. Andrew's United Church since 1926) 1862-1882: Ontario Vernacular/Italianate/Gothic church used as a meeting place for Markham Village Town Council.
- Franklin House 1873-1882: hotel was used as meeting place for Markham Village Town Council; located on the north side of the old village town hall and was demolished with a parking lot now in place.
- Markham Village Town Hall (96 Main Street Markham) 1882-1946 - Italianate structure built by John Wilson 1882 was first permanent home to town council, also home to local jail, storage of volunteer fire brigade equipment and home to Masonic and Oddfellow Lodges; sold in 1946 to become a theatre and now housing private offices.
- Markham Village Fire Hall (1950–1970)- dual fire station built 1950 with room for council chambers; fire hall was later demolished and replaced by current Markham Fire & Emergency Services Station 97 - 209 Main Street North.
- Buttonville Township Offices - 8911 Woodbine Avenue (1971–1990) - Modern brick building initially built for Buttonville Township in 1950. It has since been demolished and is currently the site of Chapel Ridge Funeral Home and Cremation Centre.

== See also ==
Preceded by 8911 Woodbine Avenue	Seat of the Town of Markham; 1989–2012	Succeeded by defunct with the formation of the City of Markham
Preceded by None	Seat of the City of Markham; 2012–	Succeeded by current
