= Markham—Thornhill (provincial electoral district) =

Provincial electoral district in Ontario, Canada

Coordinates: 43.835°N 79.313°W

Ontario electoral district
- Markham—Thornhill in relation to other Greater Toronto Area districts

Provincial electoral district
- Legislature: Legislative Assembly of Ontario
MPP
Logan Kanapathi
Progressive Conservative
- District created: 2015
- First contested: 2018
- Last contested: 2025

Demographics
- Population (2021): 97,510
- Electors (2025): 72,291
- Area (km²): 42
- Pop. density (per km²): 2,321.7
- Census division: York
- Census subdivision: Markham

Markham—Thornhill is a provincial electoral district in Ontario, Canada. It elects one member to the Legislative Assembly of Ontario. The riding was created in 2015.

== Members of Provincial Parliament ==
Markham—Thornhill
Assembly	Years	Member	Party
Riding created from Markham—Unionville and Thornhill
42nd	2018–2022	Logan Kanapathi	Progressive Conservative
43rd	2022–2025	Logan Kanapathi	Progressive Conservative
44th	2025–present	Logan Kanapathi	Progressive Conservative

== Election results ==
Winning party in each polling division of Markham—Thornhill at the 2025 Ontario general election

2025 Ontario general election
Party	Candidate	Votes	%	±%
Progressive Conservative	Logan Kanapathi	14,287	53.58	+4.76
Liberal	Nirmala Armstrong	10,580	39.68	+2.18
New Democratic	Paul Sahbaz	1,176	4.41	–4.64
Green	Shane O'Brien	623	2.34	–0.21
Total valid votes		26,666	99.31	–0.27
Total rejected, unmarked and declined ballots		185	0.69	+0.27
Turnout		26,851	37.14	–2.54
Eligible voters		72,291		
Progressive Conservative hold		Swing		+1.29
Source: Elections Ontario

Winning party in each polling division of Markham—Thornhill at the 2022 Ontario general election

2022 Ontario general election
Party	Candidate	Votes	%	±%
Progressive Conservative	Logan Kanapathi	14,011	48.82	−1.63
Liberal	Sandra Tam	10,763	37.50	+13.11
New Democratic	Matthew Henriques	2,597	9.05	−12.28
Green	Zane Abulail	733	2.55	+0.27
New Blue	Jennifer Gleason	376	1.31	
Centrist	Mansoor Qureshi	219	0.76	
Total valid votes		28,699	100.0	
Total rejected, unmarked, and declined ballots		121		
Turnout		28,820	39.68	
Eligible voters		72,345		
Progressive Conservative hold		Swing		−7.37
Source(s): "Summary of Valid Votes Cast for Each Candidate" (PDF). Elections Ontario. 2022. Archived from the original on May 18, 2023.; "Statistical Summary by Electoral District" (PDF). Elections Ontario. 2022. Archived from the original on May 21, 2023.

2018 Ontario general election
Party	Candidate	Votes	%	±%
Progressive Conservative	Logan Kanapathi	18,943	50.45	+15.60
Liberal	Juanita Nathan	9,160	24.40	–26.97
New Democratic	Cindy Hackelberg	8,010	21.33	+11.14
Green	Caryn Bergmann	859	2.29	–0.04
Libertarian	David Nadler	408	1.09	N/A
Independent	Jeff Kuah	168	0.45	N/A
Total valid votes		37,548	100.0	
Progressive Conservative notional gain from Liberal		Swing		+21.29
Source: Elections Ontario

2014 general election redistributed results
Party	Vote	%
Liberal	16,074	51.37
Progressive Conservative	10,904	34.85
New Democratic	3,187	10.19
Green	729	2.33
Others	394	1.26

== See also ==
- List of Ontario provincial electoral districts
- Canadian provincial electoral districts
- Markham—Thornhill (federal electoral district)
