= Ward 7 (Markham, Ontario) =

Municipal ward in Canada

- Constituency for the Markham City Council
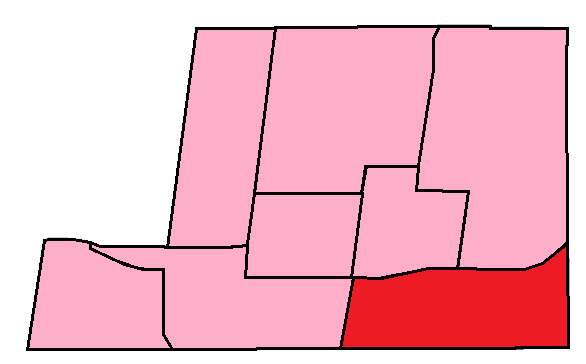
- Location of Ward 7 in Markham
- City: Markham

Current constituency
- Councillor: Nimisha Patel

Ward 7 is a municipal ward in the southeast corner of Markham, Ontario, Canada. It elects one member to Markham City Council.

Ward 7 is bounded on the north by Highway 407, on the west by McCowan Road, and on the south and east by the city limits.

The ward includes the neighbourhoods of Box Grove, Cedar Grove, Cedarwood, Legacy, Middlefield, Rouge Fairways, and Rouge River Estates.

== History ==
The ward has been based in the southeast part of Markham since 1997. Prior to that, it was located in Thornhill.

=== Councillors ===
1. Tony C. Wong (1997–2000)
2. Khalid Usman (2000–2006)
3. Logan Kanapathi (2006–2018)
4. Khalid Usman (2018–2022)
5. Juanita Nathan (2022–2025)
6. Nimisha Patel (2025–present)

== Election results ==
=== 2026 ===
Council candidate	Vote	%
Nimisha Patel	7,044	48.63
Killi Chelliah	5,324	36.76
Stanley Sam	1,149	7.93
Sameer Qureshi	967	6.68

=== 2025 by-election ===
A by-election will be held in the ward on September 29, 2025, following the election of Juanita Nathan as Liberal Member of Parliament for Pickering—Brooklin in the 2025 Canadian federal election.

Candidates

- Kristian Chan
- Killi Chelliah, real estate agent. Ran in this Ward in 2018.
- Jenny Chen, York Region District School Board Trustee for Wards 1 & 8. Worked for MPP Logan Kanapathi's constituency office.
- Abdul Samad Katawazy, York Region District School Board assessor, and business owner.
- Vicky McGrath, business owner. Ran for Aurora Town Council in 2018.
- Aranee Murugananthan, human resources partner.
- Nimisha Patel, Box Grove Residents Association Co-Chair. Ran in this ward in 2022.
- Omar Ullah

Results

Council candidate	Vote	%
Nimisha Patel	2,954	36.10
Killi Chelliah	2,098	25.64
Aranee Murugananthan	2,055	25.11
Jenny Chen	699	8.54
Vicky McGrath	141	1.72
Kristian Chan	120	1.47
Abdul Samad Katawazy	65	0.79
Omar Ullah	51	0.62

=== 2022 ===
Council candidate	Vote	%
Juanita Nathan	5,388	47.75
Nimisha Patel	2,648	23.47
Shahzad Habib	1,955	17.33
Neetu Gupta	1,292	11.45

=== 2018 ===
Council candidate	Vote	%
Khalid Usman	3,308	24.14
Kethika Logan Kanapathi	2,635	19.23
Sundy Huang	2,079	15.17
Killi Chelliah	1,961	14.31
Malar Varatharaja	1,587	11.58
Mohammed Rahman	1,065	7.77
Sothy Sella	481	3.51
Johnson Irimpan	350	2.55
Mike Srinathan	236	1.72

=== 2014 ===
Council candidate	Vote	%
Logan Kanapathi	5,673	48.25
Khalid Usman	3,539	30.10
Shusmita Sharma	1,308	11.12
Sothy Sella	1,078	9.17
Vasu Murugesu	160	1.36

=== 2010 ===
Council candidate	Vote	%
Logan Kanapathi	4,027	36.21
Debbie Wong	3,168	28.49
Adnan Khan	1,173	10.55
Raman Virk	1,100	9.89
Mohammed Rahman	1,050	9.44
Inderjit Basra	393	3.53
Senthil Varatharajah	210	1.89

=== 2006 ===
Council candidate	Vote	%
Logan Kanapathi	3,088	33.54
Tessa Benn-Ireland	1,569	17.04
Mohammed Rahman	1,272	13.82
Yahya Qureshi	1,224	13.30
William Jeyaveeran	775	8.42
Jeffry Ruo	595	6.46
Manpreet Minhas	343	3.73
Syed Zaidi	340	3.69

=== 2003 ===
Council Candidate	Vote	%
Khalid Usman	2,913	38.27
Mohan Nadarajah	2,290	30.09
Sunny Dosanjh	2,043	26.84
Ernest Onyido	365	4.80

=== 2000 ===
Council Candidate	Vote	%
Khalid Usman	3,231	67.31
Jas Dhanjal	1,569	32.69

=== 1997 ===
Council Candidate	Vote	%
Tony C. Wong	1,406	33.56
Lily Chauhan	632	15.08
Sydney Zaidi	524	12.51
Marlene Mogado	501	11.96
Joe Sealey	434	10.36
Jean Boutsis	354	8.45
Jim Blackwin	178	4.25
Mike Annamunthodo	161	3.84
