= John G. Diefenbaker Building =

Coordinates: 45°26′23.68″N 75°41′40.78″W

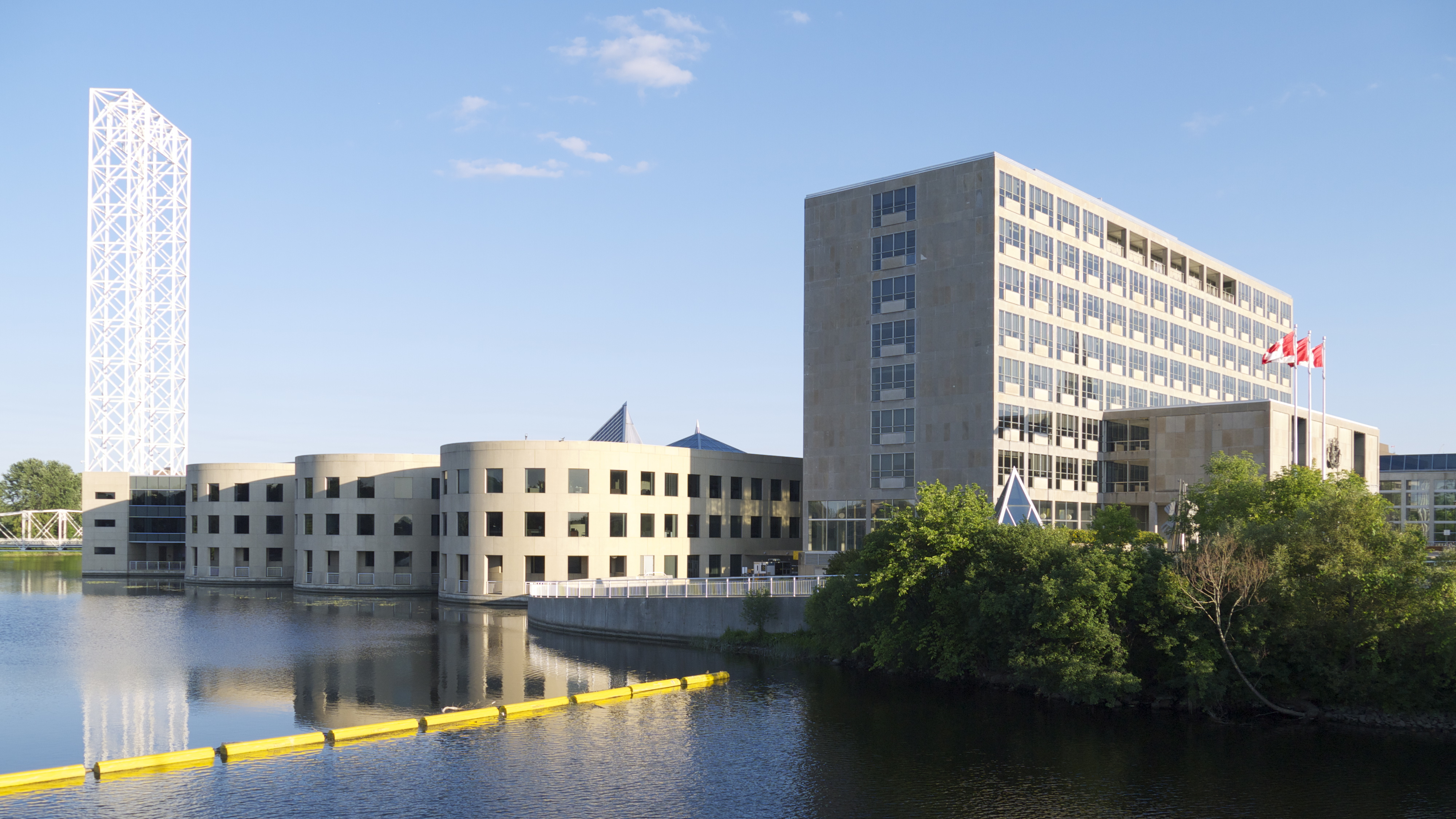
- The original 1958 portion (right) and the 1994 expansion (left) of the building on as seen from Sussex Drive over the Rideau River.
- Interactive map of the John G. Diefenbaker Building area
- Former names: Ottawa City Hall (1958–2001)
- Alternative names: Old City Hall

General information
- Type: Office building
- Architectural style: Modern, International
- Location: Ottawa, Ontario, Canada, 111 Sussex Drive, Ottawa, Canada
- Current tenants: Global Affairs Canada
- Named for: John G. Diefenbaker
- Construction started: 1956
- Completed: 1958
- Renovated: 1988–1994

Design and construction
- Architects: John Bland (original 1958 building); Moshe Safdie (1994 expansion)

The John G. Diefenbaker Building is a building in the New Edinburgh neighbourhood of Ottawa, Ontario. The building served as Ottawa's city hall from August 2, 1958, to January 1, 2001, and afterward was commonly known as Old City Hall. Purchased in 2003 by the Government of Canada, it was known by its municipal address, 111 Sussex Drive, until September 2011 when it was renamed after Canada's 13th prime minister, John Diefenbaker. The building is located on Green Island where the Rideau River empties into the Ottawa River.

== Construction ==
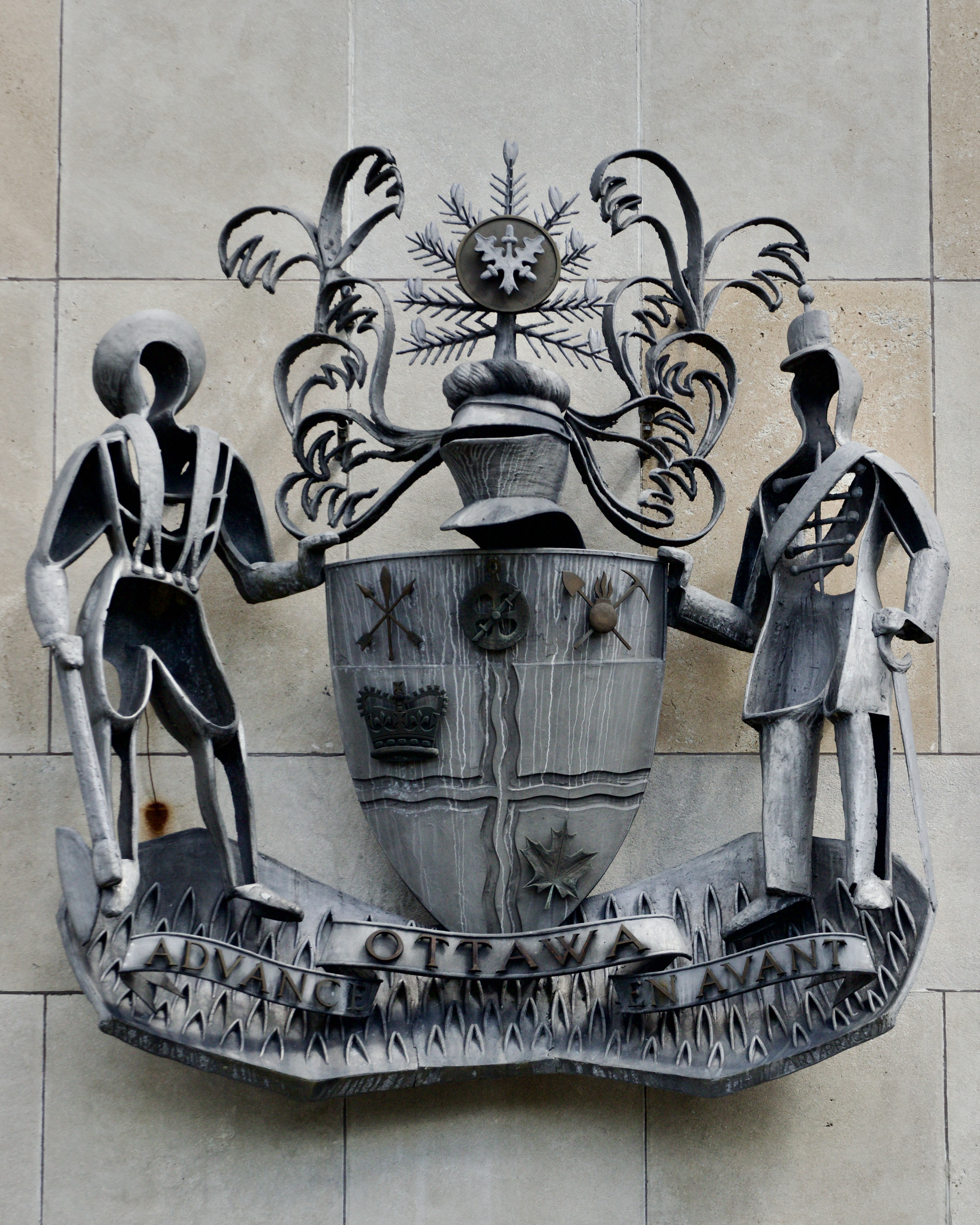
Coat of arms at the entrance of the Diefenbaker Building

After Ottawa's city hall on Elgin Street was destroyed by a fire in 1931, the city operated for the next 27 years out of temporary offices in the Transportation Building. The new international style building was opened on August 2, 1958, by Princess Margaret as a member of the Canadian Royal Family. It was designed by John Bland of the firm Rother, Bland, and Trudeau, and is considered one of the most important International Style buildings in Canada, winning the Massey Medal for design in 1959. The structure was noted for being the first building in Ottawa to be fully air conditioned. The original drawings for the building are held at the McGill University Library Special Collections as part of the John Bland Archive.

== Expansion ==
In 1988, Ottawa mayor Jim Durrell initiated a controversial scheme to expand the building, quadrupling its original size. Architect Moshe Safdie was chosen for the redesign, completed in 1994. Conflict soon broke out between Safdie and the city. Safdie demanded a higher fee and delayed the project for several months before the city acquiesced to his demand. Further disagreements broke out over a pair of eighteen story observation towers. City council voted to cut the towers to save the million dollars they cost. This infuriated Safdie who felt the towers were essential to the design. The panel that picked the design had singled out the tower as one of the highlights of the design. Eventually the city compromised and a bare scaffold was erected instead.

The new building caused considerable controversy in the city with some liking the design, but others seeing the $72 million structure a waste of money. The building was much larger than the city needed and for several years large sections were vacant.

== Federal government ownership ==
In 1999, offices were rented out to Global Affairs Canada, which is based at the nearby Lester B. Pearson Building. After Ottawa's amalgamation on January 1, 2001, it was decided that the new municipal government would be based at a new location: the former headquarters of the Regional Municipality of Ottawa–Carleton would become Ottawa City Hall. This building was considerably smaller, but was located closer to the city's centre.

In 2003, the former city hall was sold to the federal Public Works Department. Today the building mainly houses Global Affairs Canada employees. For several months in 2004, it was the site of the Gomery Inquiry hearings during the Sponsorship Scandal.

== See also ==
- First City Hall (Ottawa), city hall from 1849 to 1877
- Second City Hall (Ottawa), city hall from 1877 to 1931
- Transportation Building (Ottawa), temporary city hall from 1931 to 1958
- Ottawa City Hall, city hall since 2001
