= Markham City Council =

City council in Ontario, Canada

Markham City Council is the governing body of the city of Markham, Ontario, Canada. It consists of the mayor, eight councillors who each represent one of the city's eight wards, and four regional councillors who, along with the mayor, are elected via double direct election to represent the city at York Regional Council.

Council meets in the chambers of the Markham Civic Centre at the corner of Warden Avenue and Highway 7.

The most recent municipal election was held in 2026.

== History ==
Markham Village was incorporated as a township in 1850, establishing a council with one reeve, one deputy reeve, and three councillors. This system was used until 1 January 1971, when municipalities in York County were reorganized into the Regional Municipality of York, and Markham was newly incorporated as a town when Markham Village merged with Unionville and Thornhill east of Yonge Street. An electoral system based on six wards was established, and this numeric ward system remains mostly unchanged since its creation. Two wards were added, one in 1976 (Ward 7), and another in 1984 (Ward 8).

Minor boundary changes have taken place (1978, 1982, 1997 and 2006) with no impact on the numbering.

Most ward changes require approval by the Ontario Municipal Board (in the case of 1976 and 1997) with only the 2006 changes not requiring prior approval.

Changes were made to the boundaries for all 8 wards for 2014 elections with Thornhill assigned to Ward 1 to replace the former Ward 1 and 2 split.

The changes also take into consideration existing neighbourhoods, natural boundaries, better representation by population, effective representation and accommodation for future growth of Markham.

Then still under town status, the mayor, town councillors and regional councillors were elected by the residents of Markham every 3 years until 2006. Provincial legislation extended the election period to 4 years.

== Town Council (2006-2010) ==
Councillor	Ward	Communities represented	Notes
Frank Scarpitti	Mayor		ex officio Council Chair and CEO
Valerie Burke	1	Thornhill	
Erin Shapero	2	Thornlea	
Don Hamilton	3	Unionville, Markville, Quanztown, Downtown Markham	
Carolina Moretti	4	Dickson Hill, Mount Joy, Wismer Commons	
John Webster	5	Cornell, Mount Joy, Unionville's Berczy Village, Vinegar Hill, Greensborough	
Dan Horchik	6	West Unionville, and the surrounding Unionville neighbourhoods including Cachet, Victoria Square, Cashel, Angus Glen, Cathedraltown	
Logan Kanapathi	7	Box Grove, Armadale, Legacy	First elected politician in Canada from the Canadian-Tamil community
Alex Chiu	8	Milliken Mills	Former Ward 7 councillor

Regional Councillors

Regional councillors are elected at-large to represent the city at York Regional Council. By default the mayor is also a member of the Regional Council.

Councillor	Ward	Notes
Jack Heath	Markham	Deputy Mayor
Jim Jones	Markham	former Progressive Conservative MP for Markham; former Regional Councillor
Joseph Virgilio	Markham	Appointed in September 2009 after the death of Tony Wong.; former Ward 3 town councillor
Gordon Landon	Markham	Conservative candidates for the federal riding of Markham in next federal elections

== Town Council (2010-2012) and City Council (2012-2014) ==
The council elected in the 2010 municipal election took office on December 1, 2010. The town council members became city council members on July 1, 2012, when Markham changed from a town to a city.

Councillor	Ward	Communities represented	Notes
Frank Scarpitti	Mayor		ex officio Council Chair and CEO
Valerie Burke	1	Thornhill, Langstaff, Steeles Corner	
Howard Shore	2	Thornlea, German Mills	Chair of Communications and Information Technology Sub-Committee, vice-chair of Community & Fire Services
Don Hamilton	3	Unionville, Downtown Markham	
Carolina Moretti	4	Dickson Hill, Mount Joy, Wismer Commons, Ramerville	Chair of Canada Day Committee and Economic Development Committee
Colin Campbell	5	Cornell (Grand Cornell, Upper Corner), Mount Joy, Berczy Village, Vinegar Hill, Quantztown, Greensborough, Locust Hill, Markham Village	former Toronto Fire Services captain
Alan Ho	6	Buttonville, Brown's Corner, Cachet, Victoria Square, Cashel, Angus Glen, Cathedraltown	
Logan Kanapathi	7	Box Grove, Armadale, Legacy, Cedar Grove	
Alex Chiu	8	Milliken Mills, Hagerman's Corner	former Ward 7 councillor and owner of retail store at Market Village Mall

Regional Councillors

Regional councillors are elected at-large to represent the city at York Regional Council. By default the mayor is also a member of the Regional Council.

Councillor	Ward	Notes
Jack Heath	Markham	Deputy Mayor
Jim Jones	Markham	former Progressive Conservative MP for Markham (1997–2000); former Regional Councillor (1988–1997); Toronto Liaison Committee Chair
Gordon Landon	Markham	Conservative candidates for the federal riding of Markham in next federal elections; Development Services Committee - Chair of Transportation
Joe Li	Markham	former Progressive Conservative/Conservative candidate during past federal elections - Scarborough—Rouge River (1997 federal elections) and Markham—Unionville (2004 and 2006)

== City Council (2014-2018) ==
The council elected in the 2014 municipal election took office on December 1, 2014. Wards boundaries were changed with former Ward 1 and 2 combined as one (with portions moved to other wards), former Ward 6 became Ward 2.

Councillor	Ward	Communities represented	Notes
Frank Scarpitti	Mayor		ex officio Council Chair and CEO
Valerie Burke	1	Thornhill, Langstaff, Steeles Corner, German Mills, Thornlea	Defeated former Ward 2 councillor Howard Shore in the new Ward 1
Alan Ho	2	Buttonville, Brown's Corner, Cachet, Victoria Square, Cashel, Cathedraltown	Elected to the new Ward 2, formerly Ward 6
Don Hamilton	3	Unionville, Downtown Markham	
Karen Rea	4	Mount Joy, Wismer Commons (South of Bur Oak), Markham Village, Ramerville	newly elected defeating incumbent Carolina Moretti
Colin Campbell	5	Cornell (Grand Cornell, Upper Corner), Vinegar Hill, Quantztown, Locust Hill, Dickson Hill (East of Markham Road)	former Toronto Fire Services captain
Amanda Yeung Collucci	6	Angus Glen, Berczy Village, Wismer Commons (North of Bur Oak), Dickson Hill (West of Markham Road)	This is a newly created Ward 6 taking some parts of Ward 2 & 4
Logan Kanapathi (until June 7, 2018); Khalid Usman (from June 27, 2018)	7	Box Grove, Armadale, Legacy, Cedar Grove	
Alex Chiu	8	Milliken Mills, Hagerman's Corner	former Ward 7 councillor and owner of retail store at Market Village Mall

Regional Councillors

Regional councillors are elected at-large to represent the city at York Regional Council. By default the mayor is also a member of the Regional Council.

Councillor	Ward	Notes
Jack Heath	Markham	Deputy Mayor
Jim Jones	Markham	former Progressive Conservative MP for Markham (1997–2000); former Regional Councillor (1988–1997); Toronto Liaison Committee Chair
Nirmala Armstrong	Markham	local lawyer and elected to replace Gordon Landon
Joe Li	Markham	former Progressive Conservative/Conservative candidate during past federal elections - Scarborough—Rouge River (1997 federal elections) and Markham—Unionville (2004 and 2006)

== City Council (2018-2022) ==
The following councillors were elected in the 2018 municipal election.

Councillor	Ward	Communities represented	Notes
Frank Scarpitti	Mayor		ex officio Council Chair and CEO
Keith Irish	1	Thornhill, Langstaff, Steeles Corner, German Mills, Thornlea	
Alan Ho	2	Buttonville, Brown's Corner, Cachet, Victoria Square, Cashel, Cathedraltown	
Reid McAlpine	3	Unionville, Downtown Markham	
Karen Rea	4	Mount Joy, Wismer Commons (South of Bur Oak), Markham Village, Ramerville	
Andrew Keyes	5	Cornell (Grand Cornell, Upper Corner), Vinegar Hill, Quantztown, Locust Hill, Dickson Hill (East of Markham Road)	
Amanda Yeung Collucci	6	Angus Glen, Berczy Village, Wismer Commons (North of Bur Oak), Dickson Hill (West of Markham Road)	
Khalid Usman	7	Box Grove, Armadale, Legacy, Cedar Grove	
Isa Lee	8	Milliken Mills, Hagerman's Corner	33-year council veteran and incumbent Alex Chiu did not run

Regional Councillors

Regional councillors are elected at-large to represent the city at York Regional Council. By default the mayor is also a member of the Regional Council.

Councillor	Ward	Notes
Jack Heath	Markham	
Jim Jones	Markham	former Progressive Conservative MP for Markham (1997–2000); former Regional Councillor (1988–1997); Toronto Liaison Committee Chair
Don Hamilton	Markham	Deputy Mayor (2018–2022), former Ward 3 councillor (2009–2018)
Joe Li	Markham	former Progressive Conservative/Conservative candidate during past federal elections - Scarborough—Rouge River (1997 federal elections) and Markham—Unionville (2004 and 2006)

== City Council (2022-present) ==
The following councillors were elected in the 2022 municipal election.

Councillor	Ward	Communities represented
Frank Scarpitti	Mayor	At-Large
Keith Irish	1	Thornhill, Langstaff, Steeles Corner, German Mills, Thornlea
Ritch Lau	2	Buttonville, Brown's Corner, Cachet, Victoria Square, Cashel, Cathedraltown
Reid McAlpine	3	Unionville, Downtown Markham
Karen Rea	4	Greensborough, Mount Joy, Wismer Commons (South of Bur Oak), Markham Village, Ramerville
Andrew Keyes	5	Cornell (Grand Cornell, Upper Corner), Vinegar Hill, Quantztown, Locust Hill, Dickson Hill (East of Markham Road)
Amanda Yeung Collucci	6	Angus Glen, Berczy Village, Wismer Commons (North of Bur Oak), Dickson Hill (West of Markham Road)
Juanita Nathan (until May 14, 2025); Nimisha Patel (from September 29, 2025)	7	Box Grove, Armadale, Legacy, Cedar Grove
Isa Lee	8	Milliken Mills, Hagerman's Corner

Regional Councillors

Regional councillors are elected at-large to represent the city at York Regional Council. By default the mayor is also a member of the Regional Council.

Councillor	Notes
Michael Chan	Deputy Mayor, former Liberal MPP for Markham–Unionville and provincial Cabinet Minister
Jim Jones	former Progressive Conservative MP for Markham
Joe Li	
Alan Ho	former City Councillor for Ward 2

== Vacancies ==
City council vacancies are filled by a by-election, as in the case in 2009 when then Ward 3 councillor Joseph Virgilio resigned to become Regional Councillor and Don Hamilton elected as the new Ward 3 councillor.

Prior to the Ward 3 by-election Joseph Virgilio was appointed to fill the vacancy left by the death of Regional Councillor Tony Wong.

== Committees ==
Committees are created and chair and represented by city councillors to deal with issues and by-laws that impact the city. The chair and vice-chairs are elected selected by the mayor.

STANDING COMMITTEES

- Development Services Committee
- General Committee
- Committee of the Whole

OTHER COMMITTEES

- Cornell Hub
- Langstaff Implementation
- Licensing
- Parking Advisory
- Environmental Issues
- Thornhill
- Toronto Liaison
- Green Print Steering
- Public Realm Advisory
- Storm Water Management Liaison
- School Board Liaison
- Seniors Hall of Fame Awards
- Stiver Mill Preservation

ADVISORY COMMITTEES

- Committee of Adjustment
- Heritage Markham Committee
- Achievement & Civic Recognition Awards (ACRA)
- Agricultural Advisory Committee
- Pandemic Readiness Emergency Plan (PREP) Steering
- Public Art Advisory
- Seniors' Hall of Fame Awards
- Environmental Advisory
- Race Relations
- Advisory Committee on Accessibility
- Animal Care
- Environmental Issues
- Cycling & Pedestrian Advisory

SUB-COMMITTEES

- Communications Committee and Information Technology
- Budget
- Licensing
- Milliken Mills
- Parking Advisory
- Southeast Community Centre & Library Design
