= Transportation Building (Ottawa) =

Office building in Ontario, Canada

Coordinates: 45.425297°N 75.692786°W

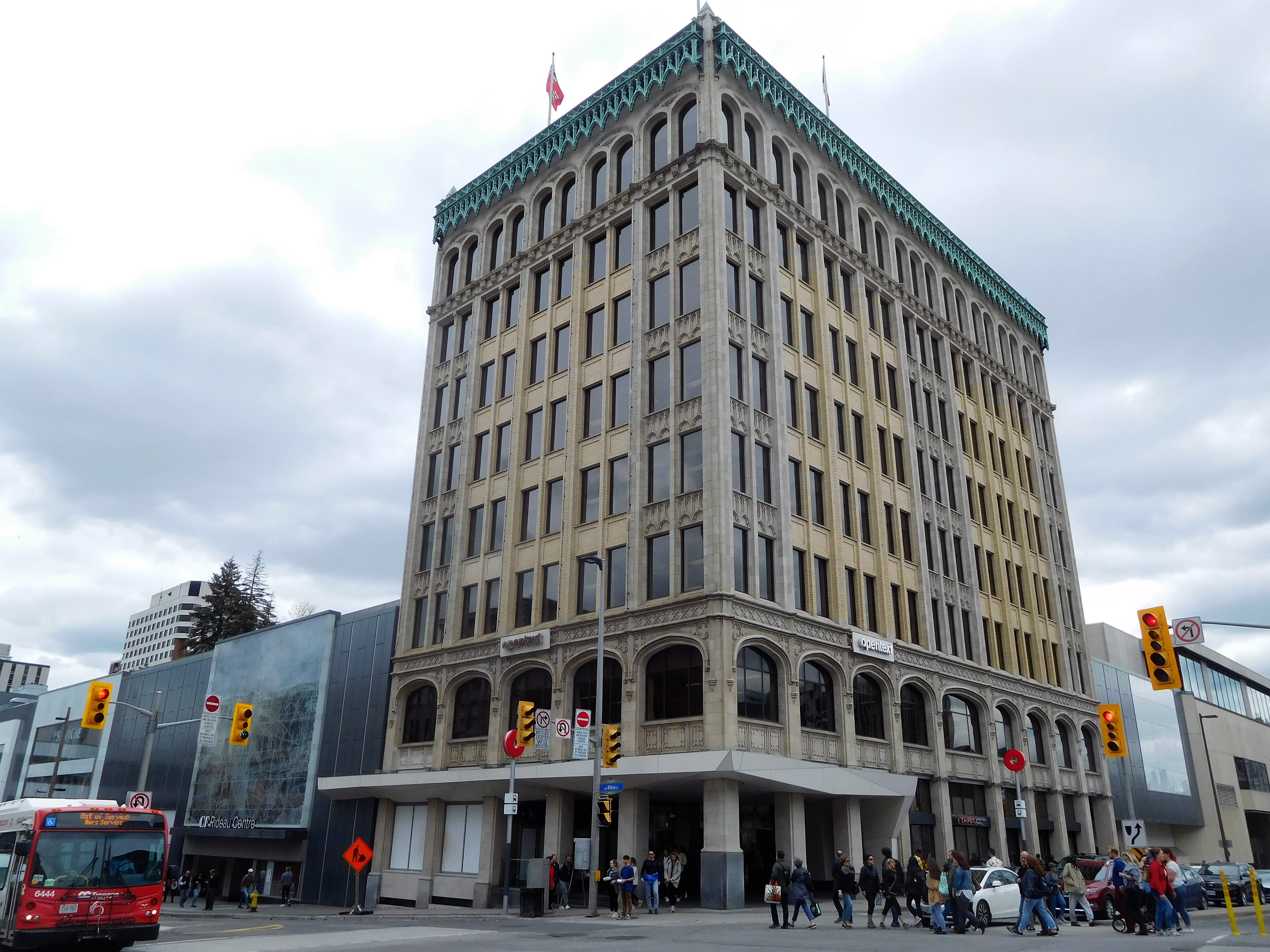
Transportation Building

The Transportation Building, 10 Rideau Street, Ottawa, Ontario, Canada is a historic Gothic Revival/Chicago school office tower. The building stands at the intersection of Sussex Drive and Rideau Street.

It was designed by architect John Albert Ewart built by C. Jackson Booth, son of lumber baron J.R. Booth in 1916. It was across the street from Union Station, now the Senate of Canada Building, and was thus named the Transportation Building.

When Ottawa's second city hall was destroyed in a fire in 1931 the building became Ottawa's temporary city hall. Originally the city only occupied part of the building, but eventually it took over the entire structure. The city left for a new city hall on Green Island in 1958.

In 1965 it was expropriated by the federal government and became home of federal workers.

The bottom levels of the structure are today integrated into the Rideau Centre.
