= Islington Avenue =

Road in Ontario, Canada

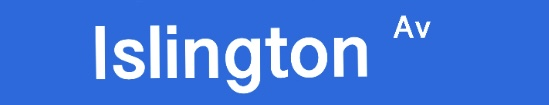
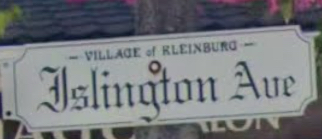
- York Regional Road 17
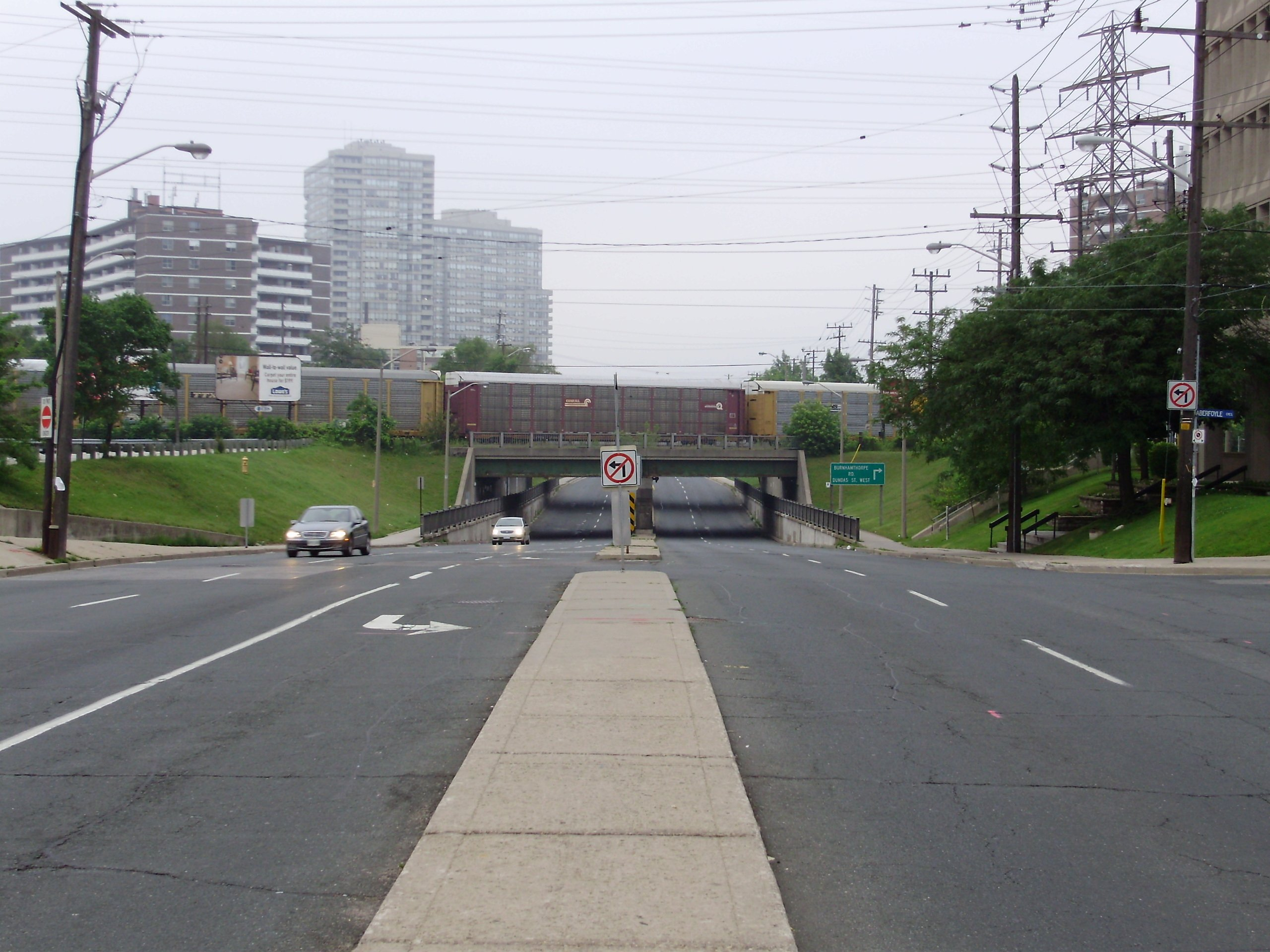
- Islington Avenue north of Bloor Street

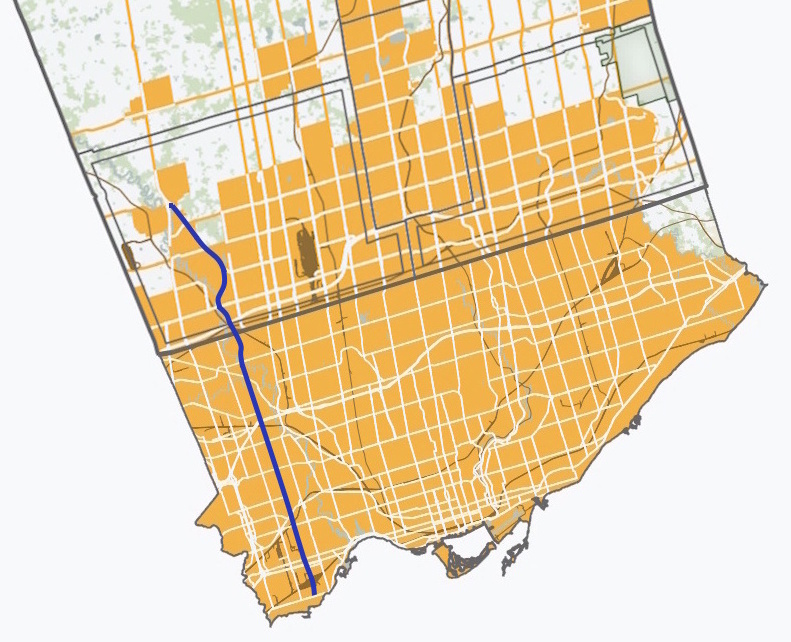
- Route of Islington Avenue through Toronto and Vaughan (blue line)
- Maintained by: City of Toronto; York Region
- Length: 19.1 mi (30.7 km)
- Location: Toronto; Vaughan
- South end: Lake Shore Boulevard in Toronto
- Major junctions: Gardiner Expressway; The Queensway; Bloor Street; Dundas Street; Eglinton Avenue; Dixon Road; Highway 401; Rexdale Boulevard; Albion Road; Finch Avenue; Steeles Avenue; Highway 7 Langstaff Road; Rutherford Road; Major Mackenzie Drive
- North end: Highway 27 in Vaughan

Other
Nearby arterial roads
← Kipling Avenue	Royal York Road; Weston Road →

Islington Avenue is a north–south arterial road in the Cities of Toronto (passing through the major districts of Etobicoke and North York) and Vaughan, the latter being within York Region. It runs from Lake Shore Boulevard West at Seventh Street in the New Toronto neighbourhood to Highway 27 north of the historic village of Kleinburg. The street is 30.6 kilometres (19.1 mi) long.

Islington Avenue gets its name from the former Village of Islington, today a neighbourhood in Toronto. It is designated as York Regional Road 17 in York Region.

== Route ==
Islington Avenue today begins at Lake Shore Boulevard West opposite the north end of seventh Street in New Toronto on the shores of Lake Ontario, in the southwest area of Toronto. It proceeds north, interchanging with Gardiner Expressway and then reaches Bloor Street and Islington station on Line 2 Bloor-Danforth of Toronto's subway system. Just to the north, it reaches the namesake Islington neighbourhood at Dundas Street, where the historic Montgomery's Inn, built in 1832, and now operated as a museum by the City of Toronto, is located. It continues north through a series of suburban neighbourhoods in the former city of Etobicoke including Richview, Kingsview Village, and Rexdale, where it has an interchange with Highway 401. South of Finch Avenue (where it crosses the Humber River, has a stop, Rowntree Mills, on Line 6 Finch West, a light rail line, and enters the former city of North York), the street changes from a straight to a sinuous course which it has for the remainder of its length, passing through the neighbourhood of Humber Summit. North of Steeles Avenue it enters the City of Vaughan, and traversing the Woodbridge district (which includes Pine Grove), passing just east of its historic village centre north of Highway 7. Near Rutherford Road, it borders two suburban conservation areas, the Boyd Conservation Area and Kortright Centre for Conservation. North of Major Mackenzie Drive, it passed through the historic village centre of Kleinburg as its main street before angling westwards to terminate at the parallel Highway 27.

== History ==
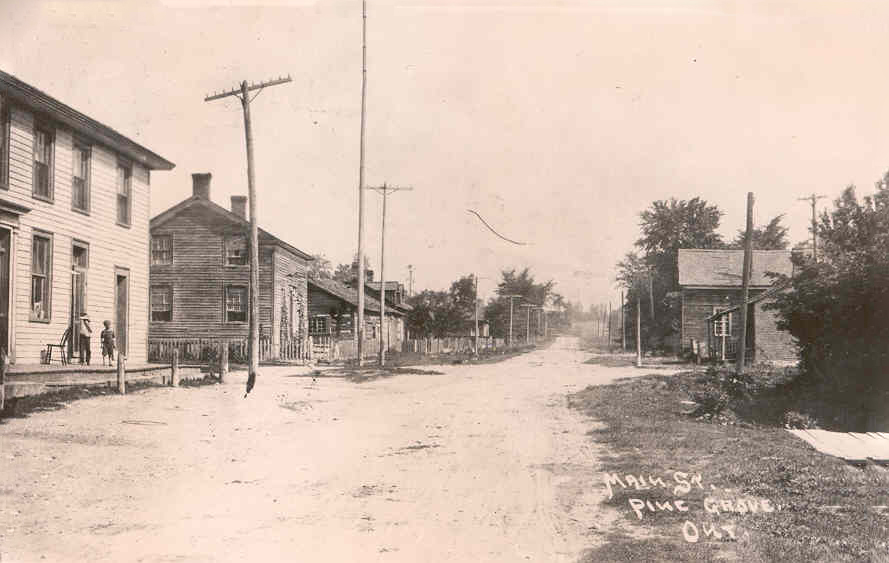
Islington Ave. (then locally named Main St. and part of the Vaughan Plank Road) in Pine Grove in 1870

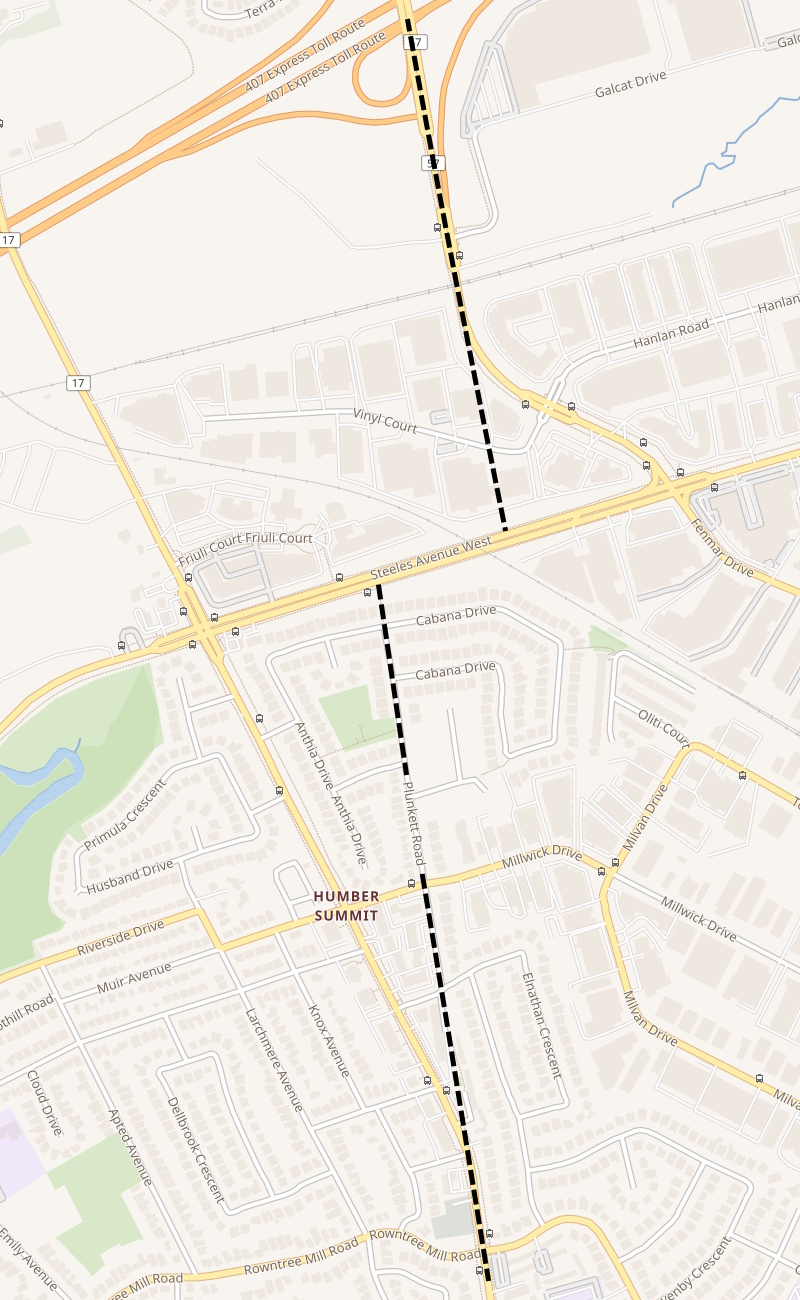
The original combined concession road alignment, allowing for a jog at Steeles Ave. (black dashed line), of the original northernmost section of Islington Ave. in Toronto along Plunkett Rd. and the southernmost section of Pine Valley Dr. in Vaughan, compared to their modern alignments

The street was first surveyed in 1799 as the Middle Road. At the time, the northernmost part of the road in what was then Etobicoke Township was part of the same surveyed concession road as present-day Pine Valley Drive in Vaughan, with a jog at what is now Steeles Avenue. Later, in the 19th Century, a northwesterly diversion was built to connect the villages of Woodbridge and Kleinburg, with the bypassed portion today a residential street named Plunkett Road. in the mid-20th Century, Pine Valley was also realigned eastwards to tie into a new industrial street named Fenmar Drive (See map).

In combination with Albion Road, Islington was historically part of a route connecting the former villages of Woodbridge and Weston. Originally, the later divergent route did not pass uninterrupted through Woodbridge, but had a break between what is now Highway 7 and Woodbridge Avenue (originally Pine Street), with the resumption being a continuation of Pine. The gap was closed in the early 1960s to create the present continuous road.

The southernmost section of Islington Avenue between Lake Shore Blvd. West and Birmingham Street in New Toronto, once an independent town, was originally Seventh Street until 1980 (the continuation south of Lake Shore is still designated as such), when Islington Avenue was extended south of Horner Avenue. This connection required a new alignment north of Birmingham Street, which crossed over to the top of Sixth Street before continuing north over a Canadian National Railway yard, now the Willowbrook Rail Maintenance Facility.

In York Region, Islington Avenue was formerly designated as York Regional Road 7, but when Highway 7 was downloaded to the Region in 1997, Islington Avenue was changed to York Regional Road 17 so Highway 7 could retain its number.

== Public transit ==
Islington subway station opened on Bloor St in 1968. Today the 110 Islington South serves the street south of the station, while the 37 Islington runs along the street from the station to Steeles.

== Landmarks ==
Landmarks and notable sites along Islington from south to north

Landmark	Cross street	Notes	Image
Willowbrook Rail Maintenance Facility	Evans Ave	Crossed by an overpass	
Islington subway station	Bloor St		
Montgomery's Inn	Dundas St	Historic structure	
St. George's Golf and Country Club	The Kingsway		
Richview Collegiate Institute	Eglinton Ave		
Don Bosco Catholic Secondary School	Dixon Rd	Former Keiller Mackay Collegiate Institute	
Rexdale Presbyterian Church	Rexdale Blvd		
Thistletown Collegiate Institute	Elmhurst Dr		
St. Roch's Roman Catholic Church	Finch Ave		
Pine Ridge Cemetery	Finch Ave		
Humber Summit Library	Steeles Ave		
Boyd Conservation Area	Rutherford Rd		
McMichael Canadian Art Collection			

== Sources ==
- Brown, R. (2020). Toronto's Lost Villages. Dundurn. ISBN 978-1-4597-4658-9.
