= Kleinburg =

- Suburban village
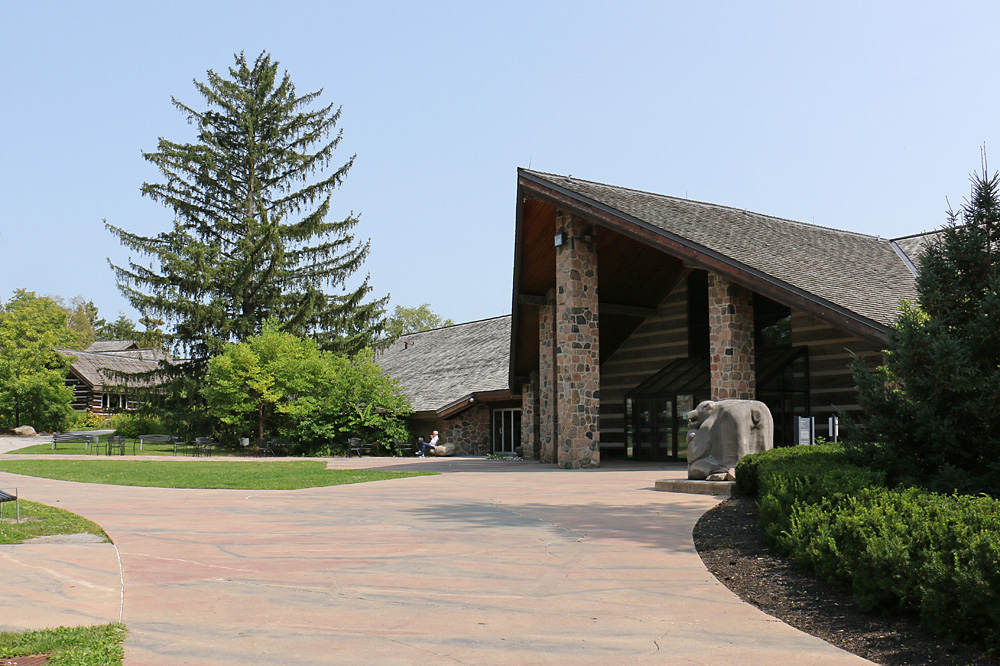
- The McMichael Canadian Art Collection gallery in Kleinburg
- Interactive map of Kleinburg
- Coordinates: 43°50′N 79°37′W
- Country: Canada
- Province: Ontario
- Regional Municipality: York
- City: Vaughan
- Founded: 1848

Population (2001)
  - Total: 4,595
- Demonym: Kleinburger
- Postal Code: L0J
- Website: www.kleinburgvillage.ca

Kleinburg is a suburban historic village in the City of Vaughan, Ontario, Canada. It is home to the McMichael Canadian Art Collection, an art gallery with a focus on the Group of Seven, and the Kortright Centre for Conservation. In 2001, the village and its surrounding communities had a population of 4,595; the historic village itself has 282 dwellings, with a population of 952 and is situated between two branches of the Humber River. The historic village is bounded by Highway 27 on the west and Stegman's Mill Road to the east. Kleinburg has subsumed the nearby hamlet of Nashville, but it has not yet itself been fully subsumed into the main urban area of Vaughan.

== Geography ==
The historic village is located between two branches of the forested Humber River valley. The district at-large consists mainly of semi-rural estate-style residential in the north, a small suburban residential area in the south (bordering Woodbridge), the newer and larger suburban "New Kleinberg" in the west, and the wide valley of Humber River's eastern branch in the east.

== History ==
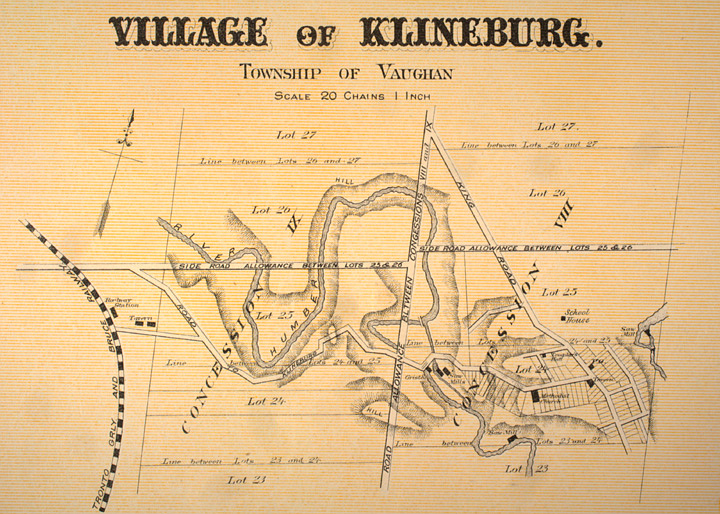
1878 map of Kleinburg (spelled as Klineburg)

The community began in 1848 when John Nicholas Klein (1825–1854), a German-Canadian settler built a flour mill along the Humber River's west branch in the valley in 1847. A settlement soon resulted at the bottom of the hill, originally named "Kleinsburg" (after John Klein, and "berg" being German for hilly country or hill). The village at the top of the hill was known as "Mount Vernon", but by 1890 both became known as Kleinburg (sometimes spelled "Klineburg" on older maps). The Howland family later took over the flour mill, and added a sawmill and store. Over time, more and more businesses sprung up to support the mills, notably the Howland's flour mill, which was the largest between Barrie and Toronto and attracted farmers for miles. A community developed in town, with hotels, merchant shops, schools and churches.

A plank road was built through Kleinburg in 1860 by the Vaughan Plank Road Company, running from Thistletown north through Woodbridge, Pine Grove, and Kleinburg to the King township border. The road had tollbooths (including one located in Kleinburg), and travelers were made to pay a toll for the upkeep. There was local opposition from farmers in later years, and the municipality took over in 1896, eliminating the tolls.

Due to the sprawling valleys and topography of the area, a railway station for Kleinburg had to be established outside of town on the Toronto, Grey & Bruce Railway line (present-day Canadian Pacific Railway) in 1870, to the west of town on the other side of the Humber River valley. This area became the community known as Nashville (after a local named Jonathan Scott and his wife who came from Nashville, Tennessee. A hotel, grain elevator, church, coal and lumber yard sprung up. A Nashville post office was established in 1881.

The first Kleinburg railway station was built by the TG&B in 1870, but a new station was built in 1907 by the Canadian Pacific due to line upgrades. Passenger service to the Kleinburg railway station ended in 1964, but the station was saved due to efforts by prominent Canadian and Kleinburg resident Pierre Berton for use by Scouts Canada. In 1976 it was moved into town for preservation, next to the Kleinburg Public School.

Highway 27 was built to the west of town along the Humber River valley in 1937-1938, diverting through traffic from the town along Islington Avenue.

=== Suburban Growth ===
In the 1960's, some suburban residential areas began to develop south of the village.

In the early 2010's, development started on the new Nashville Heights (now called New Kleinburg) area to the west, bordered by Nashville Road, Major Mackenzie Drive, Huntington Road and the CPKC railway line. An extension of Highway 427 opened to the south in September 2021, ending at Major Mackenzie Drive.

== Historic village ==
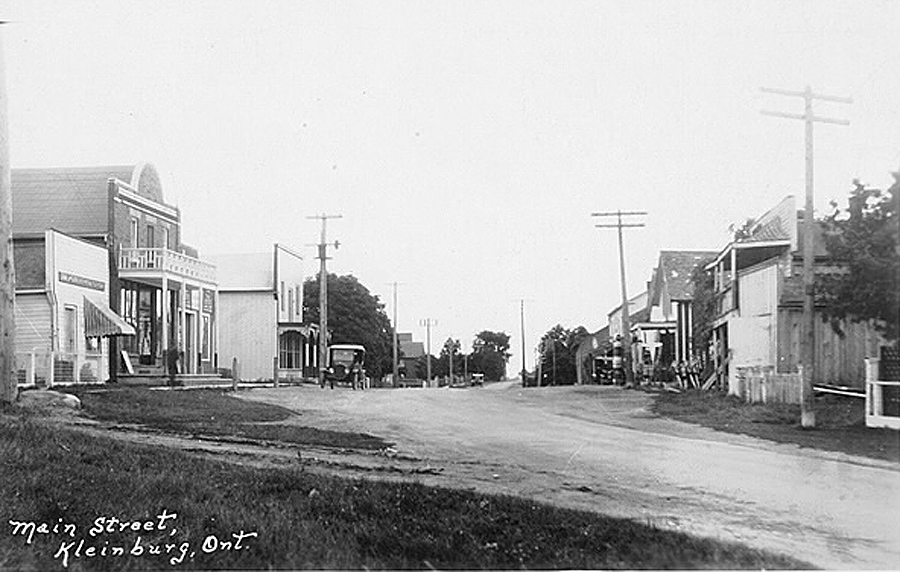
A view showing Main Street (now Islington Avenue) in Kleinburg, circa 1910.

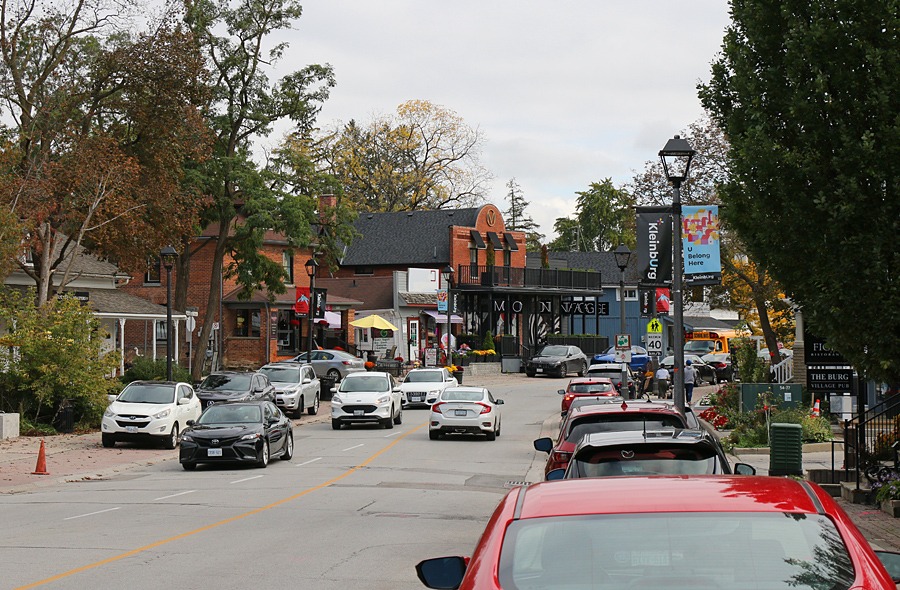
Downtown Kleinburg in 2021.

The historic commercial district of Kleinburg along Islington Avenue has many heritage buildings, as well as modern developments with mixed residential and commercial uses. The street is lined with local shops, restaurants, and national chains including a Royal Bank branch. Its oldest extant building, built in 1867, is home of The Doctor's House restaurant. This area is part of the Kleinburg-Nashville Heritage Conservation District, which gives it some protection from redevelopment.

Nearby local attractions include the McMichael Art Gallery, Kortright Centre for Conservation, Humber River Trails, Bindertwine Park, Pierre Berton Heritage Centre, and Copper Creek Golf Course.

== Politics ==
Kleinburg is within Ward 1 of the City of Vaughan. The municipal councillor is Marilyn Iafrate.

The nearby community of Nashville is considered part of Kleinburg. Residents of Nashville receive many of their services, such as postal and medical services, within Kleinburg.

== Education ==
Many non-Catholic students were once bused to nearby King City Secondary School in King City. Since the opening of Emily Carr Secondary School however, busing was eliminated and many students were forced to walk for a significant amount of time to the school (since no school special lines were opened for this community). Due to the small population of Kleinburg, they do not have enough eligible schoolchildren to establish their own high school. In 2008, the oldest and most historical school, Kleinburg Public Elementary school, was demolished and a new public elementary school by the same name was built and opened in September 2009. There are 5 schools in Kleinburg:

- Kleinburg Christian Academy (Private Elementary)
- Kleinburg Public Elementary School (Public Elementary)
- Ecole La Fontaine (French Public Elementary School)
- Montessori School of Kleinburg (Private School)
- Pope Francis Catholic School (Public Catholic School)

== Parks and Recreation ==
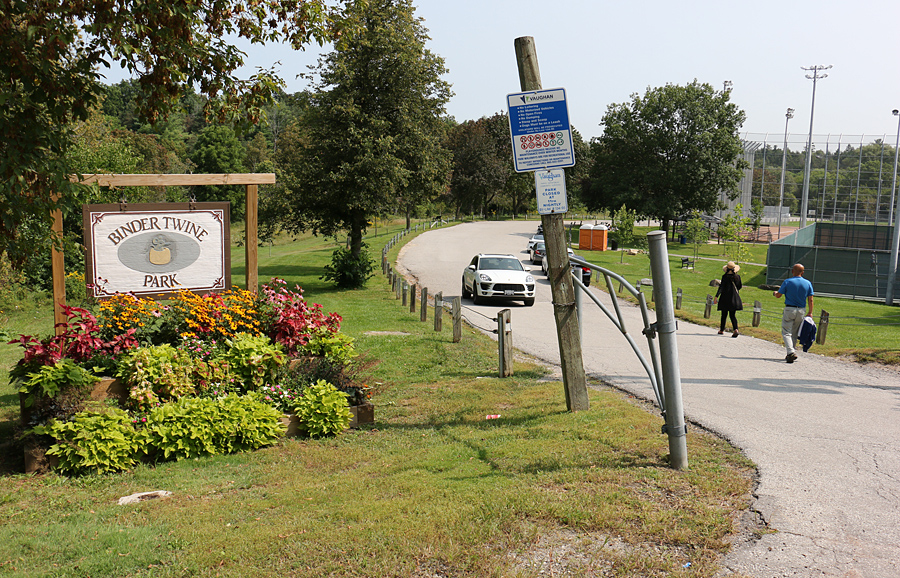
Bindertwine Park in Kleinburg

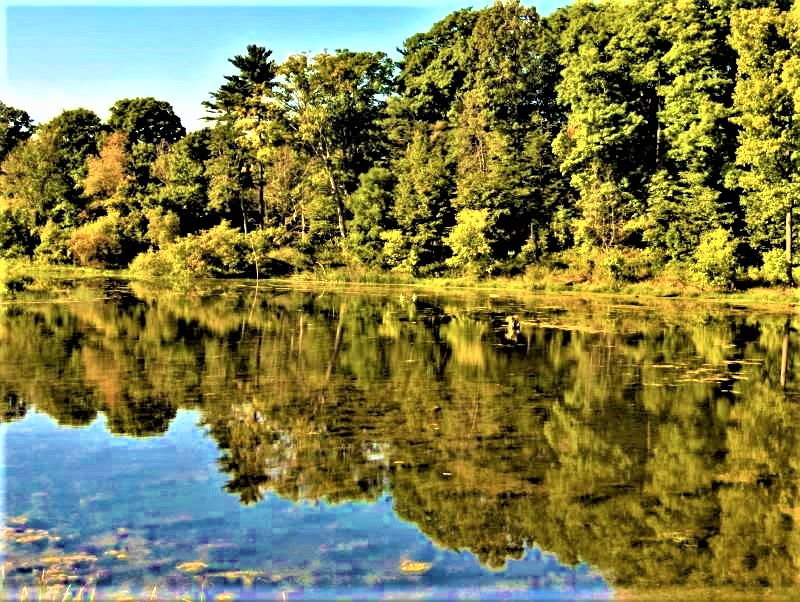
Kortright Centre for Conservation

Kleinburg is home to several parks, all of which are operated by the city of Vaughan's Parks and Forestry Operations. The largest is Bindertwine Park, east of town in the valley of the Humber River's East Branch. Trails branch out south for the William Granger Greenway - Humber Trail, that runs along the Humber River south into Boyd North, Boyd Conservation Area and Woodbridge. The Kortright Centre for Conservation is located off the East Humber River to the southwest in Vaughan.

== Culture ==
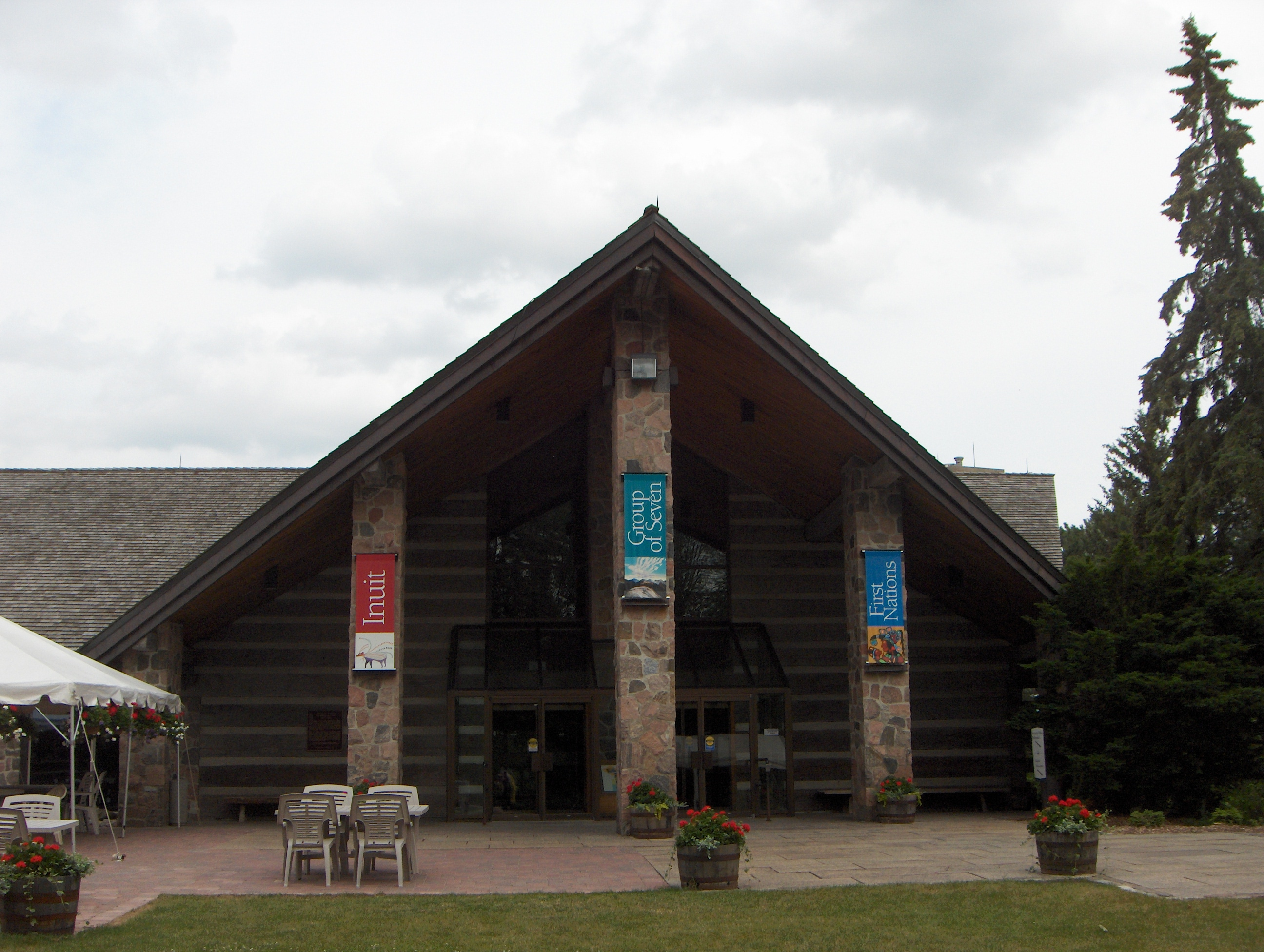
The McMichael Canadian Art Collection art museum entrance, in Kleinburg

Binder Twine was a festival held annually that attracts 25,000 people on average. This tradition began in 1890 by Charles Shaw Jr. who distributed binder twine to local farmers. Kleinburg also has a Christmas tree lighting celebration where the community comes together to donate to The Red Bow Campaign and the KARA Holiday Food Drive while waiting for the lighting of the tree in front of the Kline house. There is also Canada Day in Kleinburg and Cartunes in Kleinburg events which allow the community to celebrate the history of the village. It ceased being held as of April 2020.

== In Film ==
Kleinburg is home to the Cinespace Film Studios (formerly Toronto International Film Studios), a centre for television and motion picture production. The TV show The Forest Rangers was filmed here from 1963 to 1965. A reunion was held at the studios in June, 2013 with Gordon Pinsent and nine junior rangers in attendance.

Other films shot at the studio between 1960 and 1990 include: The Fox, The First Time, Recommendation for Mercy, Shoot, Welcome to Blood City, Death Weekend, The Shape of Things to Come, Rituals, Riel, Fish Hawk, The Amateur, Sesame Street Presents Follow That Bird, The Fly and Love at Stake. Television shows filmed here include: Hudson's Bay, Hatch's Mill, The Adventures of Timothy Pilgrim, Search and Rescue, Matt and Jenny, The Great Detective and The Littlest Hobo.

Downtown Kleinburg and the farmland surrounding it featured significantly in the 1st season of the 1971 television series, Dr. Simon Locke.

In 2006, the movie The Sentinel was filmed at the McMichael Art Gallery. In the movie, all of the Camp David scenes, both indoor and outdoor, were filmed on the grounds of the McMichael Art Gallery, most notably the scene on the "Wedding Hill" where they filmed the president's helicopter taking off and being shot down by a missile (the explosion was added in after using special effects).

In 2015, Cinespace moved out of the studios they had been renting. The Vaughan Sports Centre, a private company, has repurposed them as baseball training facilities.

== Notable residents ==
Kleinburg was home to Canadian author Pierre Berton for nearly 50 years until his death in 2004, and to his friend and business associate John G. McClelland, co-founder of McClelland & Stewart. Kleinburg was also the home of former prime minister Lester B. Pearson as well as Stephen Lecce, an Ontario MPP and minister of various portfolios first elected in 2018, who lived in Kleinburg at the time of his service as a provincial politician. Kleinburg is also the hometown of Laura Stacey, a Canadian professional ice hockey player for the Montreal Victoire and three-time olympic medallist, including a gold medal at the 2022 Winter Olympics.
