= Pine Grove, Ontario =

Pine Grove is the name of several communities in Ontario:

- Pine Grove, Lanark Highlands, Ontario
- Pinegrove, one of the Communities in Norfolk County, Ontario
- Pine Grove, North Glengarry, Ontario
- Pine Grove, Vaughan
