= Boyd Conservation Area =

Protected area in Vaughan, Ontario, Canada

- IUCN category V (protected landscape/seascape)
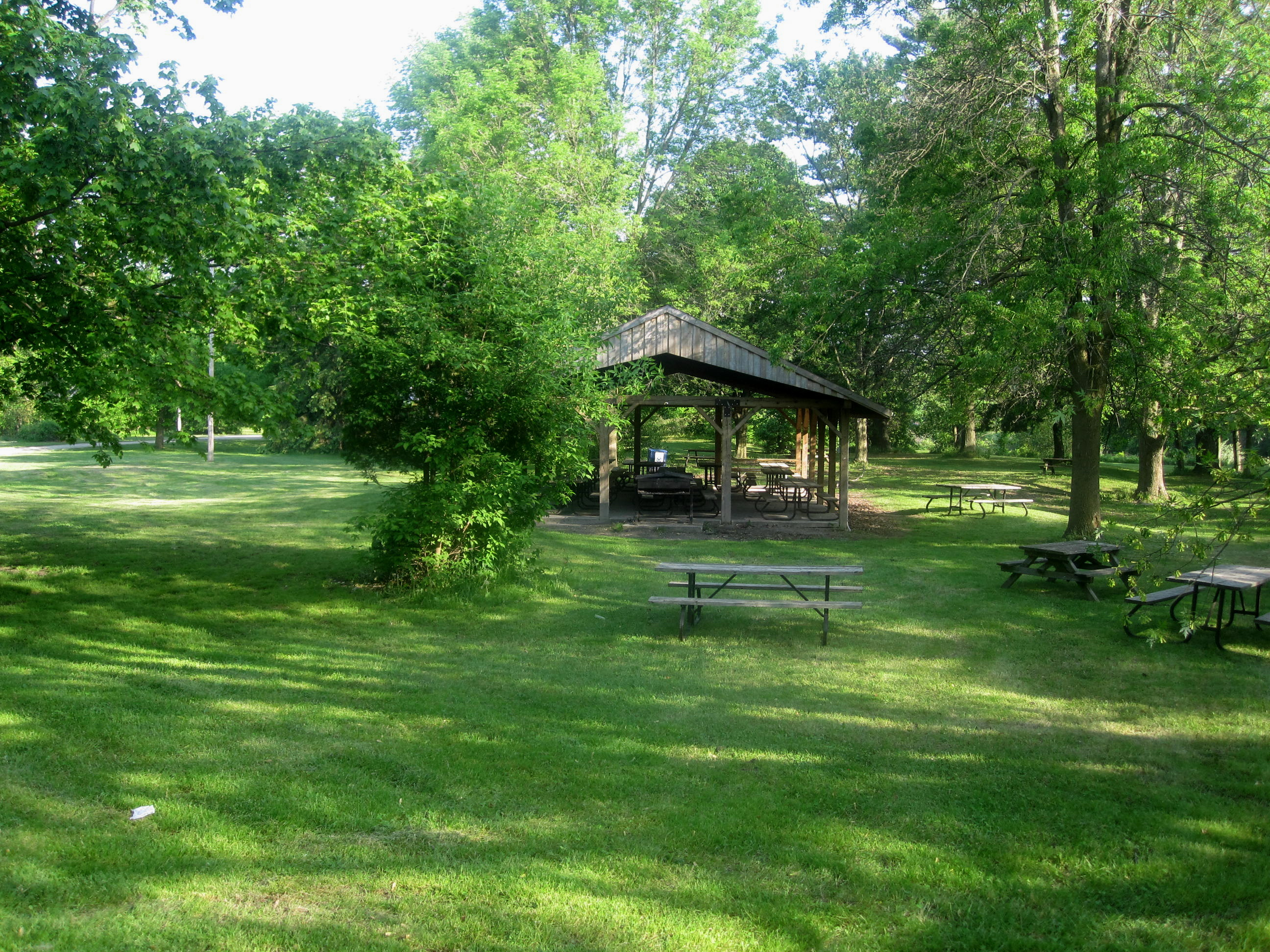
- Boyd Conservation Area, May 2011

- Location within Southern Ontario
- Location: Regional Municipality of York, Ontario, Canada
- Nearest city: Vaughan
- Coordinates: 43°48′34″N 79°35′09″W
- Area: 401 ha (990 acres)
- Established: 1957
- Owner: Toronto and Region Conservation Authority
- Website: trca.ca/parks/boyd-conservation-area/

Boyd Conservation Area (sometimes referred to as Boyd Conservation Park) is a suburban land preserve owned and operated by the Toronto and Region Conservation Authority in the city of Vaughan, Regional Municipality of York, Ontario, Canada. It also overlaps a life science Area of Natural and Scientific Interest of the same name.

It is a moderate-size park that offers facilities for numerous outdoor activities. The park is situated in the Humber River valley. Public operations run between late April and early October, and are funded in part by nominal fees to access the park. Optionally, individuals or families may acquire a membership, which provides access to a number of parks operated by the Conservation Authority.

Boyd Conservation Area was originally established in the late 1950s when the Humber Valley Conservation Authority purchased a large parcel of land along the Humber north of Woodbridge by the hamlet of Pine Grove in 1956, with the intent to provide both open public recreational space, and the preserve natural valley lands around bodies of water for flood mitigation purposes after Hurricane Hazel. It opened for the public in 1957 with forested areas, trails, picnic grounds, and a beach area along the Humber River for swimming.

In September and October, the park is used as the venue for cross country running events, the most prominent being the OFSAA (Ontario Federation of School Athletic Associations) meet which brings together the best runners in the province, a yearly event it hosted from 1960 to 1965, 1968 to 1972, 1981, 1989, and 2009.

In the summer, it is a popular destination for local residents to enjoy a picnic; businesses may also reserve one of 19 well-groomed sites in the park for corporate picnics, including a few which have sheltered areas. Bocce courts, volleyball and basketball courts, soccer fields, and children's playgrounds are found within the park for the benefit of families and youth groups.

Bird watching and nature hiking are very popular. Outdoor musical concerts are also frequent in Boyd Conservation Area throughout the summer, partly due to the sheltered outdoor sites.

The Boyd staff uniform consists of powder blue shirts bearing the TRCA crest, dark blue work pants, steel-toed boots and TRCA caps or cowboy hats. The Boyd Staff have consistently received very positive reviews on their service from patrons to the park.

Boyd Park is affiliated with the Kortright Centre and all full-time Boyd staff take up work at Kortright over the winter season. Due to limited funding, Boyd only retains a few full-time staff. The rest of their staff is made up of summer students and those who wish to complete community service outdoors, aiding in keeping the grounds clean.

A system of trails follow the Humber River north out of the park, travelling through the Boyd North area and ending at Bindertwine Park in Kleinburg.
