= Earth Rangers =

Canadian environmental charity

- Formation: 2004
- Founder: Robert Schad & Peter Kendall
- Type: Registered charity
- Purpose: Environmental education and conservation
- Headquarters: 9520 Pine Valley Drive, Woodbridge, Ontario L4H 4Z2
- President: Tovah Barocas
- Website: www.earthrangers.com

Earth Rangers (French: Éco Héros) is a Canadian registered charity focused on environmental education and conservation for children and families. The goal of the organization is to educate children and their families about environmental issues, and mobilize them to take actions that protect animals and the environment. Earth Rangers is membership-based, with over 300,000 members and alumni across Canada. Earth Rangers also provides in-school programming to elementary schools, with school assemblies that feature live animal ambassadors. Earth Rangers headquarters is located in Woodbridge, Ontario.

== Origins and mission ==
Founded in 2004 by Robert Schad and Peter Kendall, Earth Rangers began as a local organization serving schools and communities across the Greater Toronto Area. In 2011 the organization expanded its reach across Canada, and has grown into the largest kid-focused conservation organization globally.

The mission of Earth Rangers is to create a generation of conservationists.

== Programs ==
=== Membership ===
Children can sign up for a free Earth Rangers membership in the Earth Rangers App, available on Android, iOS, and Amazon. Once parents have activated the account via email verification, they receive a welcome package in the mail that includes a personalized membership card. Through the Earth Rangers App children can create avatars, listen to podcasts, read blog articles, answer daily trivia questions, and complete environmental activities to gain points and virtual badges, and unlock avatar items and animal habitats.

=== Missions ===
Missions are environmental activities that are designed for children to complete with their family and friends in the real world. Mission activities include improving shoreline health by organizing a cleanup, reducing energy at home by adjusting the thermostat, helping pollinators plant native flowers, and more. Once completed, children can gain rewards and unlock additional content on the Earth Rangers App.

=== School assemblies ===
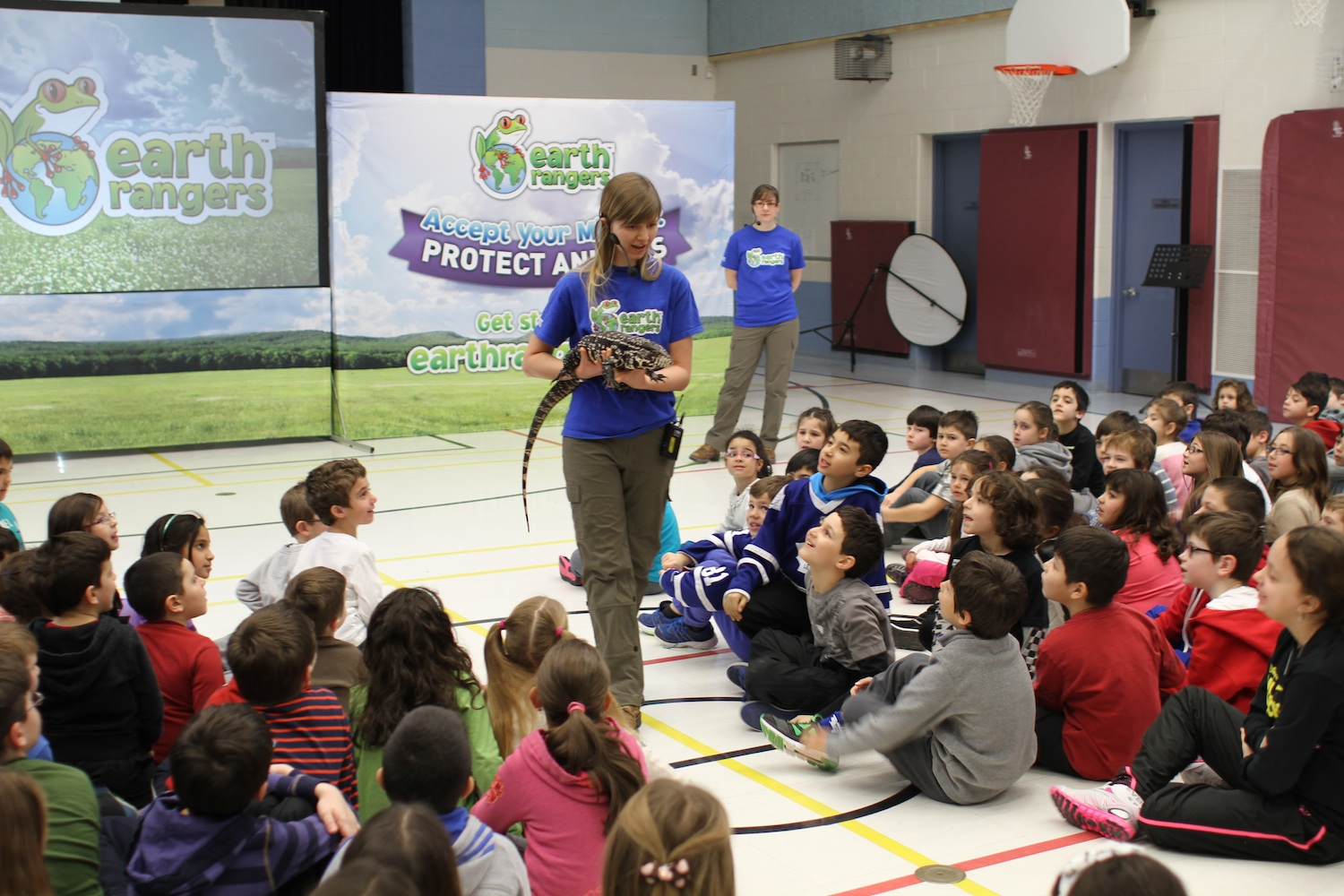
Earth Rangers presenter at a school assembly showing a tegu

Earth Rangers delivers live and virtual school presentations for grades 1-6. The hour-long program educates children about the importance of protecting biodiversity, and encourages them to undertake environmentally friendly initiatives at home and in their communities. The assembly also highlights conservation initiatives other organizations and researchers are undertaking across Canada. Presentations include live animal demonstrations by Earth Rangers animal ambassadors, such as Finigan the bald eagle, Shelley the painted turtle, and Millie the three-banded armadillo. Earth Rangers visits up to 850 schools nationwide each year.

=== Earth Rangers Clubs ===
The Earth Rangers Club program allows teachers and educators to register their classroom or eco-club as an Earth Rangers Club. Earth Rangers provides free materials and resources, including progress tracking sheets, posters, announcements, and curriculum-linked activities.

=== Project 2050 ===
Project 2050 is named for Canada's climate goal of reaching net-zero greenhouse gas emissions by the year 2050. Children can participate in Project 2050 by logging the provided climate-friendly habits daily through the Earth Rangers App or website. Habits may include unplugging unused electronics, composting, turning off lights, and walking instead of driving. As habits are logged, members collectively attempt to reach set community goals to unlock special rewards.

=== Wildlife adoptions ===
Wildlife adoptions are symbolic animal adoptions that can be purchased as either a digital or a physical adoption kit with a plush toy. Each animal is tied to a conservation project led by different researchers and conservation groups across the country. A portion of funds from each adoption supports those projects. Past examples include supporting western bumble bee habitat restoration with the Nature Conservancy of Canada, protecting the Saskatchewan River Delta with Canadian Parks and Wilderness Society, and studying wolverine populations with researchers at the University of Calgary.

=== Podcasts ===
Earth Rangers has two podcasts: The Earth Rangers Podcast and The Big Melt. They can be accessed through the Earth Rangers website or on a variety of podcasting platforms.

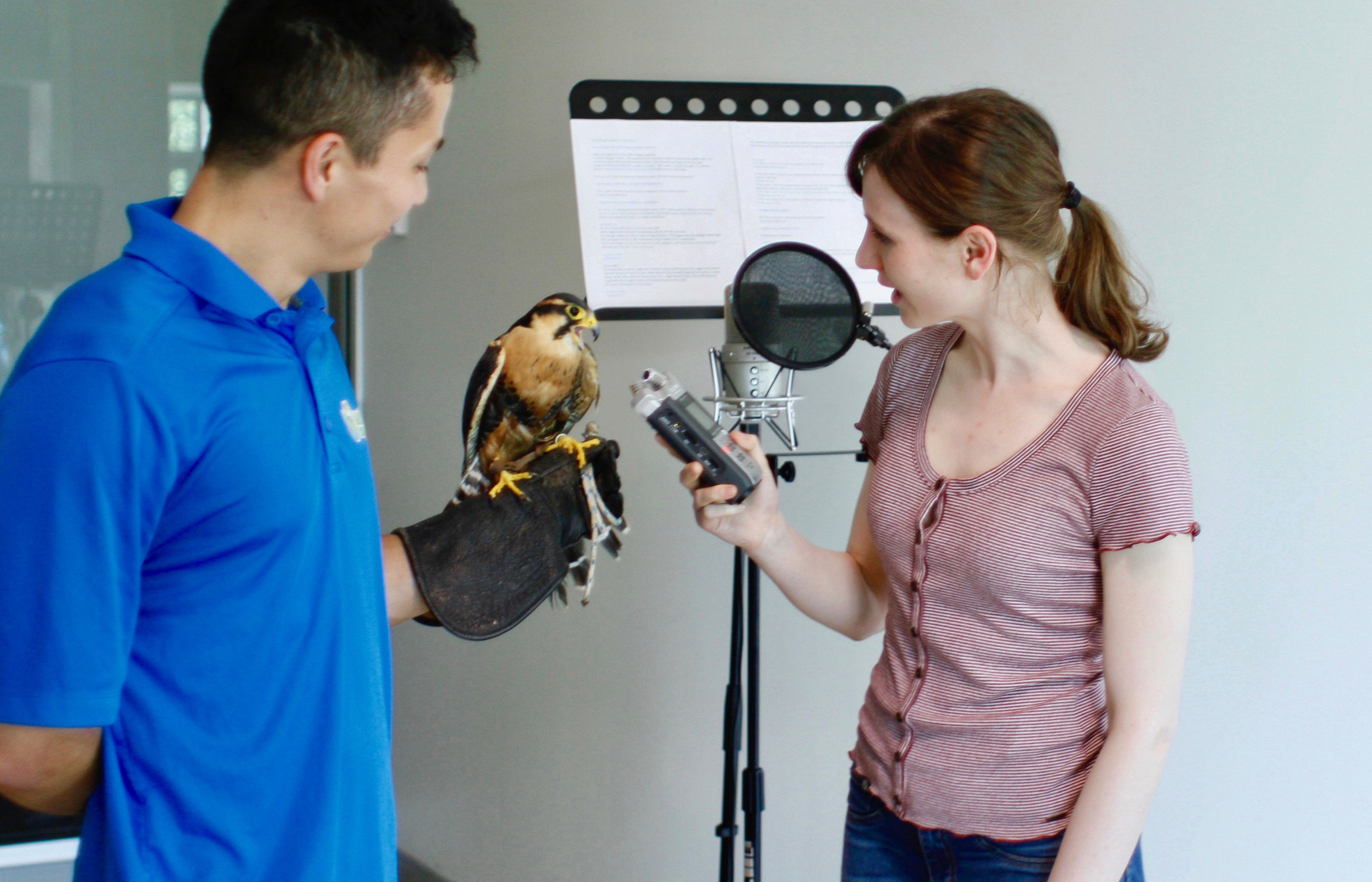
Earth Rangers Podcast recording

The Earth Rangers Podcast is geared towards children aged 6-12. It is hosted by Toronto-based actress Lee Lawson, who plays a fictional wildlife biologist named "Earth Ranger Emma" who educates kids about animals and their habitats around the world. The Earth Rangers Podcast was listed as one of the Best Canadian Podcasts of the Year in 2018 by Apple, and also won the 2018 Gold - Audio Experience from Mom's Choice Awards.

The Big Melt is for preteens and teens, and focuses on climate change and its solutions.

Both podcasts include interviews with a variety of guests, including wildlife and climate experts, authors, researchers, and students.

=== Wild Wire Blog ===
The Wild Wire Blog is an educational blog that includes animal facts, top 10 lists, quizzes, and content related to Earth Rangers programs such as Missions and Wildlife Adoptions.

== Facility ==
Earth Rangers Centre for Sustainable Technology

The Earth Rangers Centre for Sustainable Technology is an advanced green building, located in Woodbridge, Ontario, on the grounds of the Kortright Centre for Conservation. It is home to Earth Rangers' staff and animal ambassadors, and is a showcase of leading edge sustainable building technology, including energy metering, smart automation and controls, innovative water and wastewater management, solar generation, a green roof, and geothermal heating and cooling.

The Earth Rangers Centre for Sustainable Technology has been awarded LEED Platinum Certification from the Canada Green Building Council.

== Funding ==
Earth Rangers is a registered Canadian charity (charitable registration #8922 00528 RR0001). Annual audited financial statements are publicly available. Earth Rangers Foundation receives support primarily through foundation grants, government grants, and corporate donations and sponsorship. Earth Rangers applies at least 50% of its funds to conservation programs and outreach. Less than 25% of annual expenses represent fundraising and administration costs.

== Awards ==
Earth Rangers has won over 30 awards and accolades, including Best YouTube Channel at the 2026 Kidscreen Awards, Canada Clean50's Top Project for the Earth Rangers App in 2022, and the Canadian Museum of Nature's Nature Inspiration Award Not-for-Profit Large in 2014.
