= Vaughan =

- City (lower-tier)
- City of Vaughan
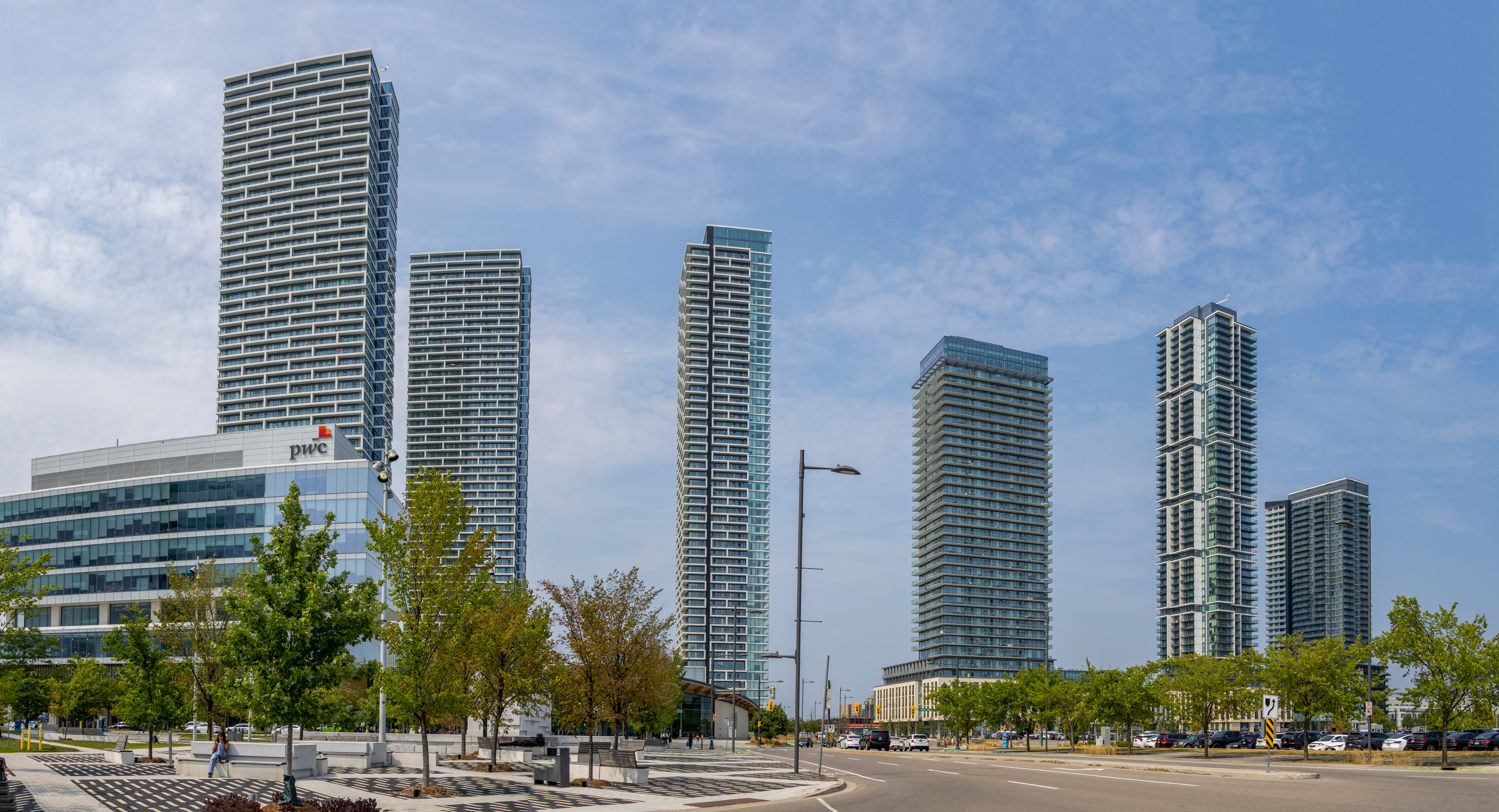
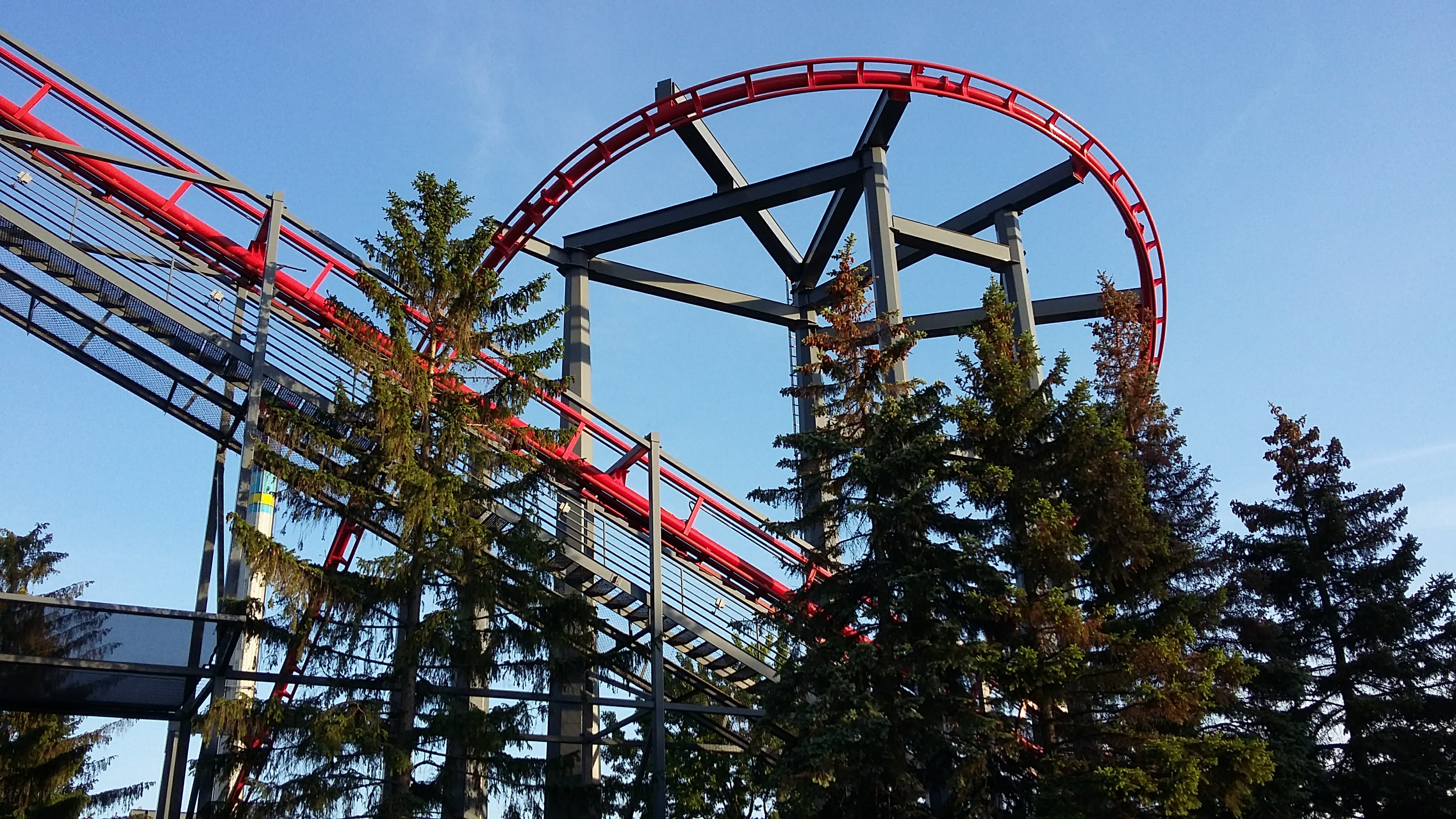
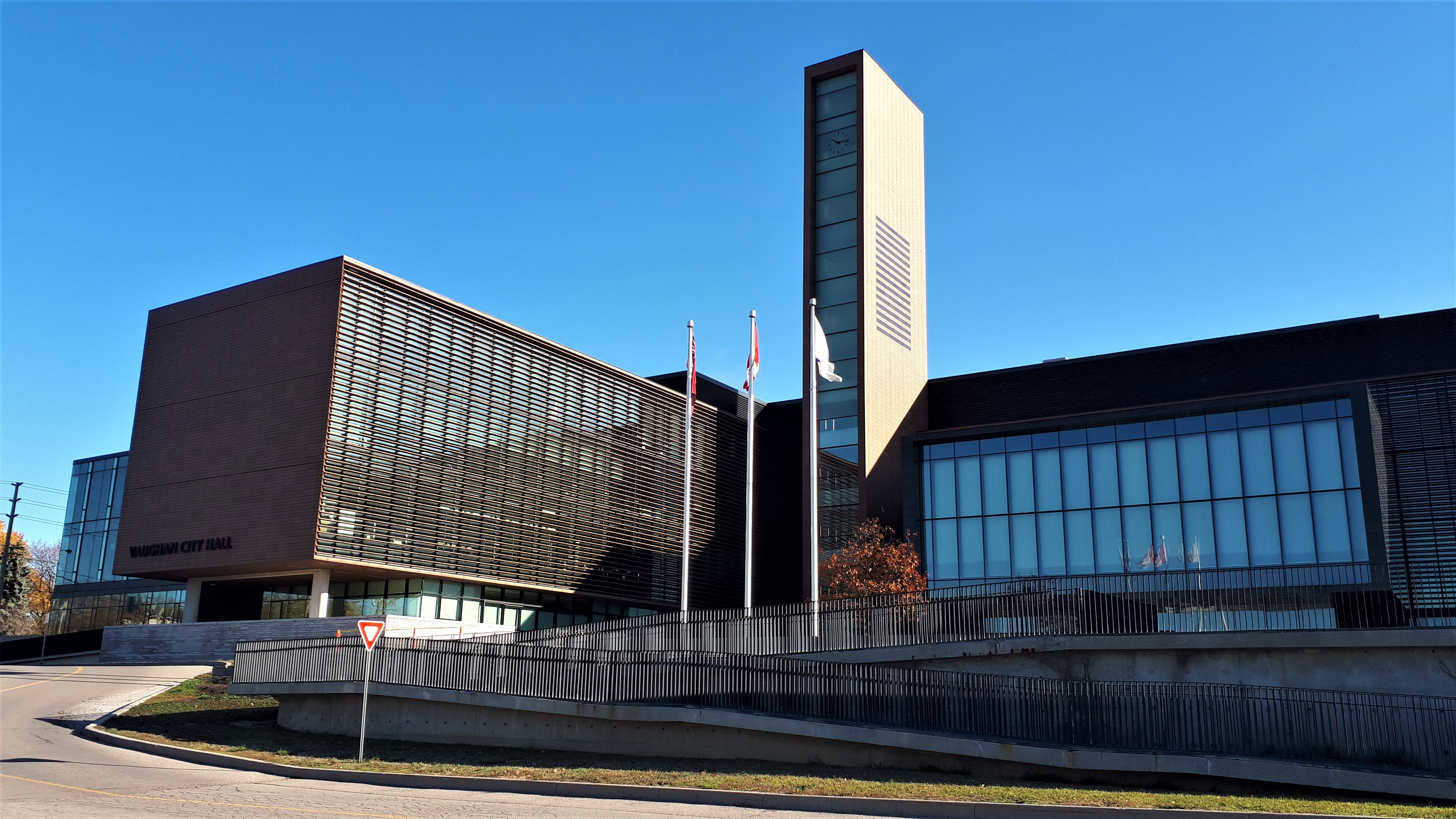
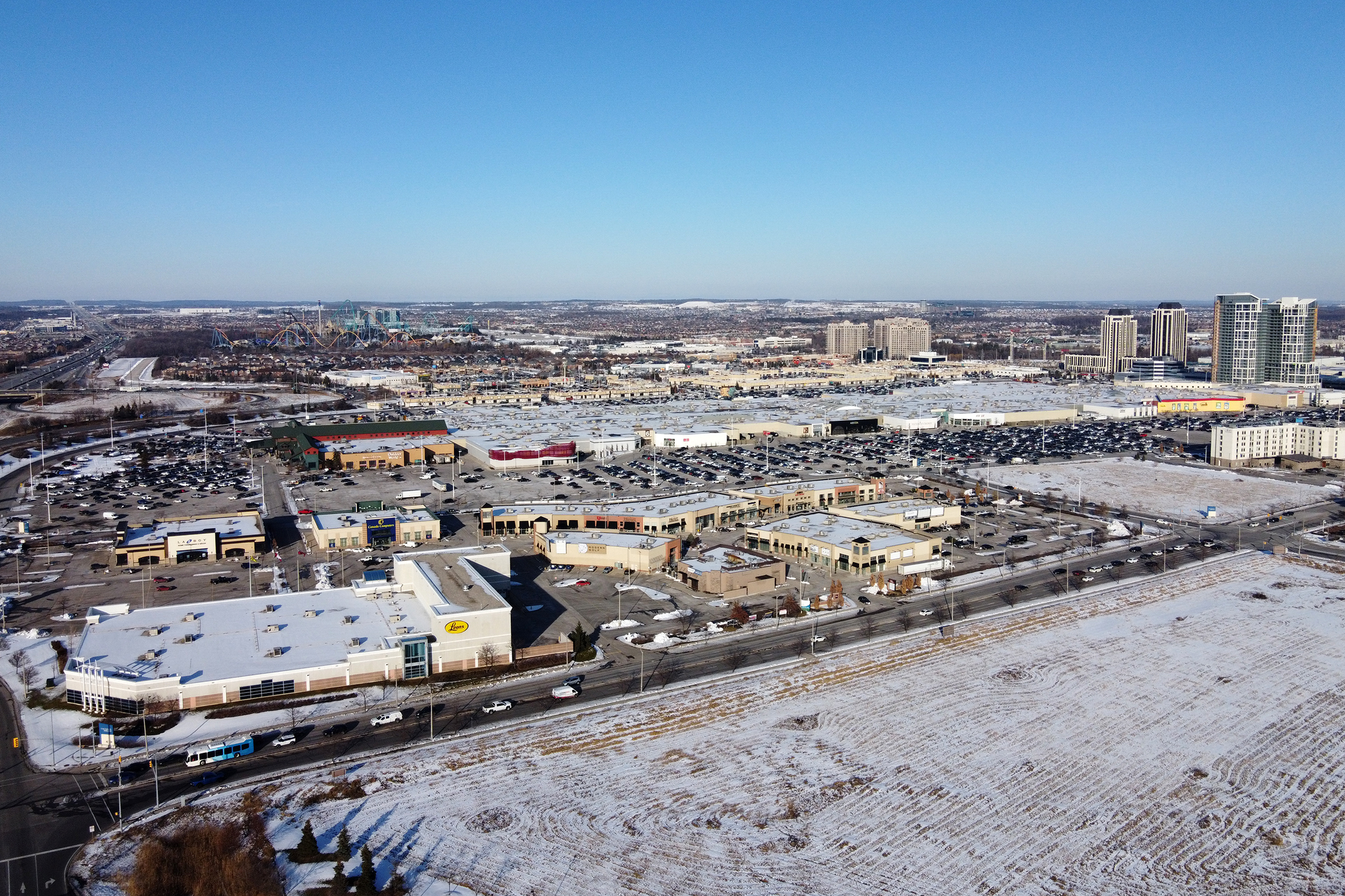
- Vaughan Metropolitan Centre Canada's Wonderland Vaughan City Hall Vaughan Mills

- Flag Seal Logo
- Interactive map of Vaughan
- Vaughan in relation to Southern Ontario Vaughan (Regional Municipality of York)
- Coordinates: 43°51′10″N 79°32′07″W
- Country: Canada
- Province: Ontario
- Regional Municipality: York
- Communities: Woodbridge; Thornhill; Maple; Kleinburg; Concord
- Settled: 1792
- Incorporated
  - Township: 1850
  - City: 1991

Government
  - Type: Municipal (City)
  - Mayor • Deputy Mayor: Steven Del Duca; Linda Jackson
  - Regional Councillors: Mario Ferri; Gino Rosati; Mario Racco
  - City Manager: Nick Spensieri
  - Governing Body: Vaughan City Council
  - MPs, and MPPs: Michael Guglielmin (C); Anna Roberts (C); Melissa Lantsman (C); Stephen Lecce (PC); Michael Tibolo (PC); Laura Smith (PC)

Area
  - Land: 272.44 km^{2} (105.19 sq mi)

Population (2021)
  - Total: 323,103 (17th)
  - Density: 1,185.9/km^{2} (3,071/sq mi)
  - Total Private Dwellings: 107,159
- Time zone: UTC−05:00 (EST)
  - Summer (DST): UTC−04:00 (EDT)
- Area codes: 905, 289, 365, and 742
- Website: www.vaughan.ca

Vaughan (/vɔːn/ VAWN) (2021 population: 323,103) is a city in Ontario, Canada. It is located in the Regional Municipality of York, just north of Toronto, Ontario. Vaughan was the fastest-growing municipality in Ontario between 1996 and 2006 with its population increasing by 80.2% during this time period and having nearly doubled in population since 1991. In 2021, the population of Vaughan was 323,103. It is the fifth-largest city in the Greater Toronto Area, and the seventeenth-largest city in Canada.

== Toponymy ==
The township was named after Benjamin Vaughan, a British commissioner who signed a peace treaty with the United States in 1783.

== History ==
In the late pre-contact period, the Wendat (Huron) people populated what is today Vaughan. The Skandatut ancestral Wendat village overlooked the east branch of the Humber River (Pine Valley Drive) and was once home to approximately 2,000 Wendat in the sixteenth century. The site is close to a Wendat ossuary (mass grave) uncovered in Kleinburg in 1970, and one kilometre north of the Seed-Barker Wendat site.

The first European to pass through Vaughan was the French explorer Étienne Brûlé, who traversed the Humber Trail in 1615. However, it was not until townships were created in 1792 that Vaughan began to see European settlements, as it was considered to be extremely remote and the lack of roads through the region made travel difficult.

Despite the hardships of pioneer life, settlers came to Vaughan in considerable numbers. The population grew from 19 men, 5 women, and 30 children in 1800 to 4,300 in 1840. The first people to arrive were mainly Pennsylvania Germans, with a smaller number of families of English descent and a group of French Royalists. This migration from the United States was by 1814 superseded by immigrants from Britain. While many of their predecessors had been agriculturalists, the newer immigrants were highly skilled tradespeople, useful for a growing community.

Among the facilities established by this group were a number of hamlets, the oldest of which was Thornhill, where a sawmill was erected in 1801, a grist mill in 1815, and had a population of 300 by 1836. Other such enclaves included Kleinburg, Coleraine, Rupertville(Maple), Richmond Hill, Teston, Claireville, Pine Grove, Carrville, Patterson, Burlington, Concord, Edgeley, Fisherville, Elder's Mills, Elgin Mills, Jefferson, Nashville, Purpleville, Richvale, Sherwood, Langstaff, Vellore, and Burwick (Woodbridge).

In 1846, the Township was primarily agricultural but had a population of 4,300. There were six grist mills and 25 saw mills. By 1935, there were 4,873 residents.

However, World War II sparked an influx of immigration, and by 1960, the population stood at 15,957. The ethnocultural composition of the area began to change with the arrival of different groups such as Italians, Jews and Eastern Europeans.

Incorporated in 1850 as Vaughan Township, a municipal government was established, and meetings were held at the "Township Hall" (Vaughan Memorial Hall) in Vellore. Vaughan Road was a historic road constructed in 1850 that linked Vaughan Township with Toronto. It incorporated parts of present-day Dufferin Street north of Eglinton Avenue in Toronto, though all that remains of it today is the separate alignment farther south, running through the eastern half of the former City of York. Highway 7 was built from Vaughan to Thornhill between 1928 and 1932, and Highway 400 to Barrie completed in 1951. Starting in the late 1950s, major municipal roads including Bathurst, Dufferin, Jane and Keele Streets that had been gravel were starting to be paved in the municipality.

In 1971, the new regional government of York Region was established, acquiring policing and welfare services from the communities it served; simultaneously, the township merged with the Village of Woodbridge to form the Town of Vaughan. In 1991, it changed its legal status to City of Vaughan.

Two F2 tornadoes tore through the city of Vaughan during the Southern Ontario Tornado Outbreak on August 20, 2009. Premier Dalton McGuinty and Mayor Linda Jackson toured the destruction the next day and reported 200 homes in critical shape and as many as 600 additional homes likely to be demolished. The tornadoes also ripped up trees, flipped cars, and left thousands of people without electricity. Vaughan declared a state of emergency because of the widespread damage. No deaths were reported from the tornadoes, but one man who was injured in the storms suffered a heart attack the following morning.

North American telephone customers placing calls to Vaughan may not recognize the charge details on their billings. Although Vaughan has been a single municipality since 1971, the incumbent local exchange carrier, Bell Canada, splits the city into three historical rate centres–Kleinburg, Maple and Woodbridge. Part of the Thornhill rate centre extends into Vaughan. Indeed, Vaughan does not even appear in the telephone book.

== Mayor and councillors ==
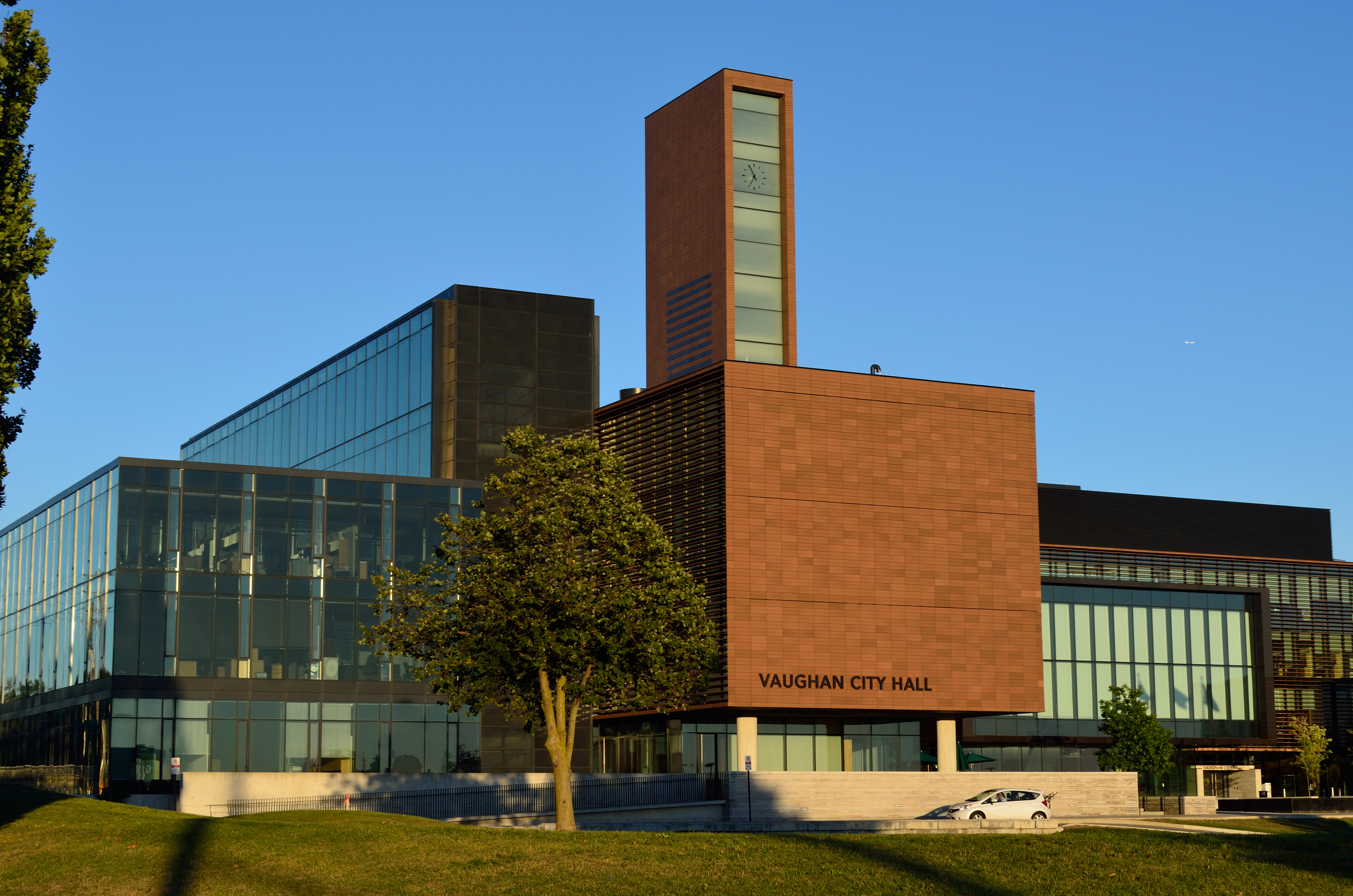
Vaughan City Hall

Vaughan is governed by a ten-member council comprising a mayor, four regional councillors, and five local councillors. The mayor, elected at large, is the head of the council and a representative on York Region Council. The four regional councillors are also elected at large, and serve on both the city council and York Regional Council. Five local councillors are also elected, one from each of Vaughan's five wards, to represent those wards on Vaughan Council.

City councillors meet at Vaughan City Hall, located in Maple. The city's City Hall was opened on September 25, 2011, and is named in memory of late Mayor Lorna Jackson. The new Civic Centre is one of the first in Canada to conform to a LEED Gold Standard, the second highest environmental classification available.

Vaughan is the first municipality in Ontario to have a Youth City Councillor. The youth city councillor is appointed as a non-voting member of Council every six months to represent the youth of Vaughan. Vaughan council originally rejected the proposal of a youth councillor but, after the Vaughan Youth Cabinet amended its proposal, Council accepted the recommendation.

After serving as mayor for nine years, Lorna Jackson saw the Town of Vaughan become incorporated as the City of Vaughan. Following the death of Mayor Lorna Jackson in 2002, Michael Di Biase was appointed mayor by Vaughan council by virtue of his position as one of two regional councillors representing Vaughan, Joyce Frustaglio was the other regional councillor. Gino Rosati, a Vaughan local councillor, was subsequently appointed by Vaughan Council to fill Di Biase's position as regional councillor and a by-election was held to fill Rosati's local councillor's position which was won by Linda Jackson, the daughter of Mayor Jackson. Di Biase first became involved in the city's politics in 1985, when he was elected as a local councillor in 1985. Di Biase retained the mayorship in the 2003 municipal election, defeating challenger Robert Craig.

In the municipal election on November 13, 2006, Di Biase was narrowly defeated by Linda Jackson, who was sworn in as mayor on December 4, 2006. On June 18, 2008, an audit of Jackson's 2006 campaign finances found that the politician exceeded her legal spending limit of $120,419 by at least $12,356, or 10 per cent. The auditors, LECG Canada Ltd., say that amount could almost double if what they believed to be unreported contributions in kind at various election events but couldn't prove are later verified.

They also found other apparent contraventions of the Canada Elections Act, including at least five instances where associated companies made donations that exceeded the normal $750 donation limit per company.

On June 24, 2008, Vaughan Council voted unanimously to hire a special prosecutor to consider laying charges against Mayor Linda Jackson under the Municipal Elections Act in reaction to the auditors' report. Council hired Timothy Wilkin, "an expert in municipal law" to decide what if any charges are to be laid. If Jackson is charged and found guilty, she would face punishments ranging from fines to removal from office.

Subsequently, an audit was conducted on former Mayor Di Biase's 2006 election campaign funds. This exposed 27 contraventions under the Elections Act, along with a $155,000 anonymous cash payment made to his lawyer to cover his legal fees. Di Biase has refused to disclose who made this payment.

On 25 October 2010, longtime MP Maurizio Bevilacqua was elected mayor and he assumed office in December 2010.

On 24 October 2022, former Ontario Liberal Party leader Steven Del Duca was elected mayor; he assumed office on November 15, 2022. Del Duca is the architect of the Protecting Vulnerable Social Infrastructure By-law, which prohibits nuisance demonstrations within 100 metres of the property line of child-care centres, congregate care facilities, hospitals, schools and places of worship. The bylaw was unanimously approved by Vaughan Council on June 25, 2024, making it the first municipality in Canada to adopt such legislation.

Steven Del Duca was re-elected mayor on October 26, 2026.

== Geography ==
Vaughan is bounded by Caledon and Brampton to the west, King and Richmond Hill to the north, Markham and Richmond Hill to the east, and Toronto — in the dissolved cities of Etobicoke and North York, to the south.

=== Communities and identity ===
The city is made up of nearly a dozen historic communities. Likely as a result of the municipality being established when it was still largely a rural area with scattered settlements, most residents (and even non-residents) identify more with the larger communities than they do with the city as a whole and have greatly expanded their areas, and the city officially designates five in the urban area as major communities, with all of the built-up areas of the city considered as being within one of them. This includes corporations such as Bell Canada, which uses the original community rate centres and lists them separately, resulting in local calling areas being different throughout the city. The city’s slogan was “The City Above Toronto” to promote population growth, until 2010 when the slogan was dropped.

- Woodbridge: North/South - Major Mackenzie/Steeles, East/West - Hwy 400/Hwy 50
- Maple: North/South - King Vaughan Line/Rutherford, East/West - Bathurst/Hwy 400
- Thornhill: North/South - Hwys. 7 and 407 (Major Mackenzie for the area west of Bathurst)/Steeles, East/West - Yonge/Dufferin
- Concord: North/South - Rutherford/Steeles, East/West - Dufferin/Hwy 400
- Kleinburg: North/South - King Vaughan Line/Major Mackenzie, East/West - Hwy 400/Hwy 50

=== Vaughan Metropolitan Centre ===
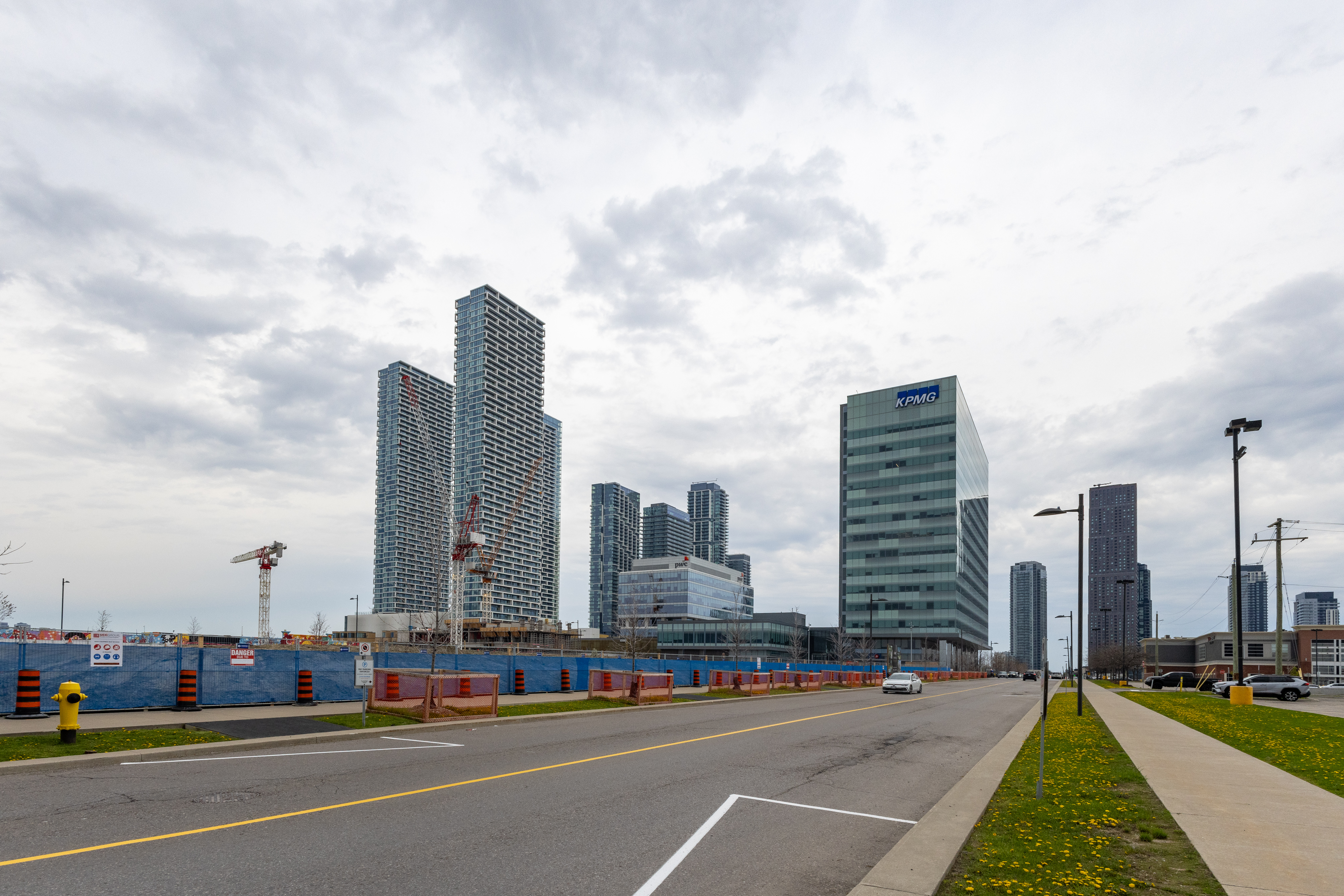
Vaughan Metropolitan Centre skyline

The Vaughan Metropolitan Centre (VMC) is a 179-hectare (442 acre) city centre under development around the intersection of Highway 7 and Jane Street, at the site of the former hamlet of Edgeley.

When the Township of Vaughan officially became a town in 1971, it was made up of four historic communities (Maple, Kleinburg, Thornhill and Woodbridge) large enough to have their own village or town centres. Vaughan committed to building a new business and commercial core distinct from all of them. This commitment became policy in 1998 when Official Plan Amendment 500 called for the Vaughan Corporate Centre, as it was then branded, to become a focal point for business activity and major commercial development.

It is served by the Vaughan Metropolitan Centre station, which is the northwestern terminus of Line 1 Yonge–University of the Toronto subway system. It is also a major transit hub for York Region Transit (YRT), as well as the Viva and Züm bus rapid transit services.

=== Climate ===
Vaughan, like much of the Greater Toronto Area, features a humid continental climate (Dfb) and has four distinct seasons.

Climate data for Woodbridge (Vaughan) Climate ID: 6159575; coordinates 43°47′N 79°36′W; elevation: 164 m (538 ft); 1981–2010 normals, 1948–2005
Month	Jan	Feb	Mar	Apr	May	Jun	Jul	Aug	Sep	Oct	Nov	Dec	Year
Record high °C (°F)	17.0 (62.6)	15.5 (59.9)	26.5 (79.7)	31.5 (88.7)	33.0 (91.4)	36.0 (96.8)	39.0 (102.2)	37.2 (99.0)	36.1 (97.0)	30.6 (87.1)	25.0 (77.0)	19.5 (67.1)	39.0 (102.2)
Mean daily maximum °C (°F)	−2.5 (27.5)	−0.5 (31.1)	4.3 (39.7)	12.0 (53.6)	18.8 (65.8)	24.1 (75.4)	26.9 (80.4)	25.4 (77.7)	20.9 (69.6)	13.9 (57.0)	6.9 (44.4)	0.8 (33.4)	12.6 (54.7)
Daily mean °C (°F)	−6.6 (20.1)	−4.8 (23.4)	−0.4 (31.3)	6.6 (43.9)	12.9 (55.2)	18.1 (64.6)	20.8 (69.4)	19.6 (67.3)	15.4 (59.7)	9.0 (48.2)	3.1 (37.6)	−2.8 (27.0)	7.6 (45.7)
Mean daily minimum °C (°F)	−10.7 (12.7)	−9.2 (15.4)	−5.2 (22.6)	1.2 (34.2)	6.8 (44.2)	12.0 (53.6)	14.7 (58.5)	13.8 (56.8)	9.8 (49.6)	4.0 (39.2)	−0.8 (30.6)	−6.4 (20.5)	2.5 (36.5)
Record low °C (°F)	−34.5 (−30.1)	−30.0 (−22.0)	−29.4 (−20.9)	−17.2 (1.0)	−6.7 (19.9)	−1.7 (28.9)	2.8 (37.0)	−0.6 (30.9)	−5.0 (23.0)	−11.7 (10.9)	−18.3 (−0.9)	−30.0 (−22.0)	−34.5 (−30.1)
Average precipitation mm (inches)	50.3 (1.98)	44.2 (1.74)	49.2 (1.94)	63.3 (2.49)	79.1 (3.11)	76.3 (3.00)	70.4 (2.77)	80.4 (3.17)	84.6 (3.33)	66.5 (2.62)	78.3 (3.08)	57.4 (2.26)	799.8 (31.49)
Average rainfall mm (inches)	20.4 (0.80)	23.2 (0.91)	31.4 (1.24)	59.6 (2.35)	79.1 (3.11)	76.3 (3.00)	70.4 (2.77)	80.4 (3.17)	84.6 (3.33)	66.0 (2.60)	71.1 (2.80)	34.6 (1.36)	697.0 (27.44)
Average snowfall cm (inches)	29.9 (11.8)	21.1 (8.3)	17.8 (7.0)	3.7 (1.5)	0.0 (0.0)	0.0 (0.0)	0.0 (0.0)	0.0 (0.0)	0.0 (0.0)	0.45 (0.18)	7.2 (2.8)	22.8 (9.0)	102.8 (40.5)
Average precipitation days (≥ 0.2 mm)	13.5	10.3	10.7	11.8	12.0	10.8	9.5	9.6	10.6	12.7	13.1	12.8	137.4
Average rainy days (≥ 0.2 mm)	4.2	4.4	6.4	10.7	12.0	10.8	9.5	9.6	10.6	12.6	11.1	6.5	108.3
Average snowy days (≥ 0.2 cm)	10.2	6.8	5.1	1.5	0.0	0.0	0.0	0.0	0.0	0.23	3.0	7.5	34.3
Source: Environment and Climate Change Canada

== Services ==
=== Health care ===
Vaughan was the largest city in Canada without a hospital until the 2021 opening of Cortellucci Vaughan Hospital on Major Mackenzie Drive north of Canada's Wonderland. Its planning began in 2007. The provincial government of Ontario approved construction of the hospital in July 2011, and a tender for bids to construct it was issued in 2014 or 2015. Land preparation for construction began in the summer of 2014. Construction on the grounds began in October 2016. The expected date of completion was late 2020. It is part of a regional hospital system with a "single governance, administration and medical staff" managed by Mackenzie Health. Officially opened on 6 June 2021, the hospital is 1.2 million square feet and has 350 beds. Cortellucci Vaughan Hospital is Canada's first smart hospital, with technology that lets medical systems and devices communicate with each other to maximize information exchange and improve patient care.

=== Transportation ===
Vaughan offers a complex transportation infrastructure, which includes highways, public transit, regional roads, municipality-funded roads, and train services.

== Demographics ==
Historical populations
Year	Pop.	±%
1971	16,189	—
1976	18,120	+11.9%
1981	30,386	+67.7%
1986	67,595	+122.5%
1991	115,477	+70.8%
1996	132,549	+14.8%
2001	182,022	+37.3%
2006	238,866	+31.2%
2011	288,301	+20.7%
2016	306,233	+6.2%
2021	323,103	+5.5%

In the 2021 Census of Population conducted by Statistics Canada, Vaughan had a population of 323,103 living in 103,914 of its 107,159 total private dwellings, a change of 5.5% from its 2016 population of 306,233. With a land area of 272.44 km^{2} (105.19 sq mi), it had a population density of 1,186.0/km^{2} (3,071.6/sq mi) in 2021.

Median age as of 2021 was 41.6, on par with the Ontario median age of 41.6.

=== Language ===
According to the 2021 Census, English is the mother tongue of 50.9% of the residents of Vaughan. Italian is the mother tongue for 11.2% of the population, followed by Russian (6.5%) and Mandarin (4.2%). Each of Spanish, Persian, Cantonese, Urdu, Punjabi, Hebrew, Tagalog (Filipino), Vietnamese, Portuguese, and Korean have a percentage ranging from 2.9% to 1.3%, signifying Vaughan's high linguistic diversity.

Mother tongue languages in Vaughan (2001–2021)
Mother tongue	2021 Canadian census		2016 Canadian census		2011 Canadian census		2006 Canadian census		2001 Canadian census	
Mother tongue	Pop.	%	Pop.	%	Pop.	%	Pop.	%	Pop.	%
English	163,950	50.91%	149,850	49.19%	141,485	49.31%	114,095	47.94%	93,130	51.28%
Italian	36,100	11.21%	40,790	13.39%	43,585	15.19%	42,375	17.8%	41,150	22.66%
Russian	20,970	6.51%	21,350	7.01%	19,185	6.69%	13,085	5.5%	7,185	3.96%
Mandarin	13,645	4.24%	9,135	3%	4,850	1.69%	2,510	1.05%	1,105	0.61%
Persian	9,440	2.93%	6,975	2.29%	4,780	1.67%	2,575	1.08%	1,295	0.71%
Spanish	8,850	2.75%	8,005	2.63%	7,890	2.75%	6,185	2.6%	3,285	1.81%
Cantonese	7,755	2.41%	6,710	2.2%	6,640	2.31%	5,350	2.25%	4,215	2.32%
Urdu	6,755	2.1%	5,710	1.87%	4,405	1.54%	2,955	1.24%	1,445	0.8%
Punjabi	5,940	1.84%	5,145	1.69%	5,200	1.81%	4,680	1.97%	3,300	1.82%
Korean	5,795	1.8%	4,370	1.43%	3,605	1.26%	2,280	0.96%	1,230	0.68%
Tagalog	5,310	1.65%	5,375	1.76%	5,345	1.86%	3,365	1.41%	1,720	0.95%
Vietnamese	5,140	1.6%	4,550	1.49%	4,195	1.46%	3,100	1.3%	1,135	0.63%
Hebrew	5,125	1.59%	4,950	1.62%	4,975	1.73%	4,030	1.69%	2,700	1.49%
Portuguese	4,615	1.43%	4,695	1.54%	4,795	1.67%	4,165	1.75%	2,560	1.41%
Tamil	4,065	1.26%	3,625	1.19%	3,535	1.23%	2,305	0.97%	535	0.29%
Arabic	3,930	1.22%	3,375	1.11%	3,160	1.1%	3,080	1.29%	1,130	0.62%
French	3,290	1.02%	3,020	0.99%	2,815	0.98%	2,365	0.99%	2,065	1.14%
Hindi	2,755	0.86%	1,890	0.62%	1,600	0.56%	1,295	0.54%	505	0.28%
Aramaic	2,635	0.82%	2,170	0.71%	—N/a	—N/a	—N/a	—N/a	—N/a	—N/a
Turkish	2,420	0.75%	1,345	0.44%	1,065	0.37%	450	0.19%	270	0.15%
Romanian	2,370	0.74%	2,560	0.84%	2,495	0.87%	1,735	0.73%	1,045	0.58%
Greek	1,665	0.52%	1,720	0.56%	1,745	0.61%	1,410	0.59%	1,190	0.66%
Polish	1,390	0.43%	1,675	0.55%	1,945	0.68%	1,935	0.81%	1,285	0.71%
German & Yiddish	1,220	0.38%	1,455	0.48%	1,780	0.62%	1,770	0.74%	1,820	1%
Serbo-Croatian	1,135	0.35%	1,305	0.43%	1,450	0.51%	1,140	0.48%	840	0.46%
Total responses	322,060	99.68%	304,640	99.48%	286,945	99.53%	238,005	99.64%	181,600	99.77%
Total population	323,103	100%	306,233	100%	288,301	100%	238,866	100%	182,022	100%

=== Religion ===
As of 2021, most reported religion among the population was Christianity (53.1%), with Catholicism (38.6%) making up the largest denomination. This was followed by Judaism (13.2%), Islam (7.4%), Hinduism (4.8%), Buddhism (2.4%) and Sikhism (1.8%). 17.0% of the population did not identify with a particular religion.

=== Ethnicity ===
Ethnic Origin (2021)	Population	Per cent
Italian	85,030	26.5
Chinese	27,235	8.5
Jewish	25,325	7.9
Russian	18,245	5.7
Canadian	17,780	5.5
East Indian	17,330	5.4
Polish	9,885	3.1
Filipino	9,140	2.9
Portuguese	8,300	2.6
English	8,265	2.6
Vietnamese	7,305	2.3
Ukrainian	7,080	2.2
Iranian	6,935	2.2
Irish	6,715	2.1
Scottish	5,895	1.8

As of 2021, visible minorities make up 35.4% of the population.

Panethnic groups in the City of Vaughan (2001−2021)
Panethnic group	2021		2016		2011		2006		2001	
Panethnic group	Pop.	%	Pop.	%	Pop.	%	Pop.	%	Pop.	%
European (Note: Statistic includes all persons that did not make up part of a visible minority or an indigenous identity.)	187,985	58.5%	195,830	64.39%	195,770	68.38%	174,485	73.31%	146,965	80.93%
South Asian	35,890	11.17%	30,610	10.06%	27,725	9.68%	20,370	8.56%	10,665	5.87%
East Asian (Note: Statistic includes total responses of "Chinese", "Korean", and "Japanese" under visible minority section on census.)	33,855	10.54%	26,420	8.69%	18,035	6.3%	13,070	5.49%	8,550	4.71%
Middle Eastern (Note: Statistic includes total responses of "West Asian" and "Arab" under visible minority section on census.)	17,625	5.49%	12,975	4.27%	9,000	3.14%	5,825	2.45%	2,250	1.24%
Southeast Asian (Note: Statistic includes total responses of "Filipino" and "Southeast Asian" under visible minority section on census.)	16,920	5.27%	15,525	5.1%	16,320	5.7%	9,655	4.06%	4,725	2.6%
African	10,510	3.27%	8,325	2.74%	7,765	2.71%	6,110	2.57%	3,580	1.97%
Latin American	8,320	2.59%	7,360	2.42%	6,055	2.11%	4,810	2.02%	2,165	1.19%
Indigenous	675	0.21%	630	0.21%	555	0.19%	320	0.13%	180	0.1%
Other/Multiracial (Note: Statistic includes total responses of "Visible minority, n.i.e." and "Multiple visible minorities" under visible minority section on census.)	9,540	2.97%	6,465	2.13%	5,080	1.77%	3,355	1.41%	2,515	1.38%
Total responses	321,315	99.45%	304,145	99.32%	286,300	99.31%	238,005	99.64%	181,600	99.77%
Total population	323,103	100%	306,233	100%	288,301	100%	238,866	100%	182,022	100%
Note: Totals greater than 100% due to multiple origin responses

== Crime ==
The total crime against persons in 2017 was 619.43 per 100,000 population, with 1.49 per 100,000 being violations causing death. Organized crime also has a notable presence in Vaughan. Notable incidents include mob shootings outside the Terrace Banquet Hall in July 2013 resulting in two deaths, one of which was mobster Salvatore Calautti and the Regina Sports Café in April 2014 resulting in the death of Carmine Verduci, as well as the Woodbridge Cafe shooting at Islington Avenue and Highway 7 in June 2015. Three killings in March 2017; on March 14, a 28-year-old Vaughan woman was shot as she sat in a car parked outside of a lighting business on Caster Avenue, on March 23, a shooting of a 26-year-old Ajax man at Jane Street and Highway 7, and on March 30, a private social club shooting near Martin Grove Road and Highway 7. In April 2017, Mayor Maurizio Bevilacqua spoke after the third March murder, stating people "should not live in fear".

On July 18, 2019, the York Regional Police announced the largest organized crime bust in Ontario, part of an 18-month long operation called Project Sindicato that was also coordinated with the Italian State Police. York Regional Police had arrested 15 people in Canada and seized $35 million worth of homes, sports cars and cash in a major trans-Atlantic probe targeting the most prominent wing of the 'Ndrangheta in Canada (the Siderno Group), allegedly headed by Angelo Figliomeni of Vaughan. On July 14 and 15, approximately 500 officers raided 48 homes and businesses across the GTA, seizing 27 homes worth $24 million, 23 cars, including five Ferraris, and $2 million in cash and jewelry. The charges laid included tax evasion, money laundering, defrauding the government and participating in a criminal organization. The investigation was motivated by a series of violent incidents in Vaughan in 2017 according to CBC News, "including an attempted murder, drive-by shootings and arsons". The charges laid included tax evasion, money laundering, defrauding the government and participating in a criminal organization.

In response to increasing hate crimes, on June 5, 2024, Vaughan became the first municipality in Ontario to introduce a "bubble zone" bylaw that prohibits demonstrations within 100 metres of vulnerable social infrastructure, such as religious institutions, schools, child care centres, hospitals and assisted living facilities.

== Culture ==
=== Attractions ===
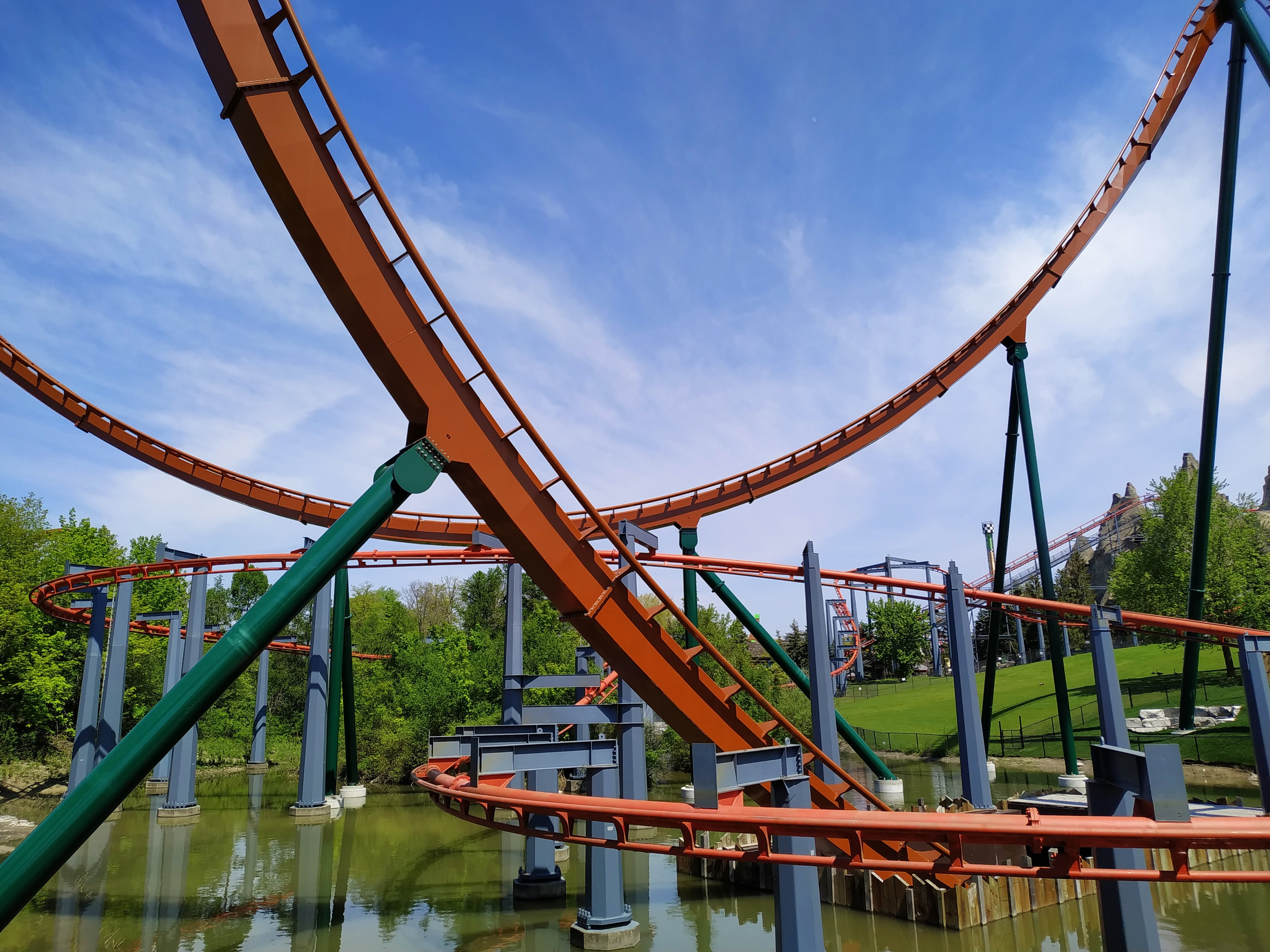
Yukon Striker and Vortex at Canada's Wonderland

- Baker's Woods, a 31-hectare old-growth forest and sugar bush at Bathurst Street and Highway 7, part of Sugarbush Heritage Park
- Boyd Conservation Area, park located east of Islington Avenue, south of Rutherford Road
- North Maple Regional Park located on Keele Street between Teston Road and Kirby Road
- Canada's Wonderland, Canada's largest amusement park, located on the east side of Highway 400 between Rutherford Road and Major Mackenzie Drive
- Cineplex Cinemas Vaughan, located near Highway 7 and Weston Road
- City Playhouse Theatre, located at Bathurst Street and New Westminister Drive
- The J. E. H. MacDonald House in Thornhill
- Kortright Centre for Conservation, located between Rutherford Road and Major Mackenzie Drive East of Islington Avenue
- McMichael Canadian Art Collection, located in Kleinburg
- Promenade Shopping Centre, near Bathurst Street and Clark Avenue in Thornhill
- Reptilia Zoo, a 2,300 m^{2} (25,000 sq ft) Reptile Zoo and Education Centre located near Vaughan Mills and Canada's Wonderland
- Vaughan Mills, a large shopping mall opened in 2004, which includes Legoland Discovery Centre

=== Sports ===
Vaughan is home to many amateur sports teams for a variety of sports, with an organization running a league for each of the four major sports. There are also rep and select levels of these sports where the Vaughan Rangers, Vaughan Panthers, and Vaughan Kings represent the city in youth hockey, the Vaughan Vikings represent the city in baseball, the Vaughan Rebels represent the city in football, and the Vaughan Panthers, and Royals United represent the city in basketball. Vaughan also has a high softball following, with the Vaughan Vikings and Woodbridge Warriors offering house league and rep opportunities, as well as and adult World Series Slo Pitch league. The city also hosts the Vaughan Flames, a youth organization exclusively for woman's hockey. The name also belonged to the former CWHL hockey team that folded in 2010. Additionally, the Vaughan Vipers formerly played in the Ontario Provincial Junior A Hockey League. In 2012, the Vipers were decommissioned and withdrew from their league.

The city is also home to numerous golf and country clubs. These include The National Golf Club of Canada, one of Canada's highest ranking golf clubs.

Vaughan Professional Sports Teams
Sport	Team	League	Years	Stadium	League Championships
Soccer	Toronto FC II	USL	2015-2017	Ontario Soccer Centre	0
Soccer	Vaughan Azzurri	L1O	2014–present	North Maple Regional Park	2
Soccer	Woodbridge Strikers	L1O	2014–present	Vaughan Grove 1	0
Soccer	York Region Shooters	CSL	1998–present	St. Joan of Arc Turf Field	3
Hockey	Vaughan Flames	CWHL	1999-2010	Vaughan Sports Village	0
Basketball	Royals United	FIBA3x3	2024–present	N/A	0
Basketball	Royals United	BRL	2024–present	Vaughan Sportsplex II	1

==== Soccer ====
Vaughan SC, Woodbridge SC and Kleinburg Nobleton SC offer house league and rep programs for youth soccer, as players for Vaughan Azzurri Woodbridge Strikers KNSC Lions respectively. These team names are also used for the city's two League1 Ontario teams. Additionally, Vaughan is home to the Ontario Soccer Association, the largest sports organization in Canada. The OSA has over 400,000 registered players, and runs leagues across the entire province. Vaughan is also home to the Canadian Soccer Hall of Fame and Museum. Vaughan is also home to the semi-professional York Region Shooters from the Canadian Soccer League.

Prior to 2018, Vaughan also played home to Toronto FC II, the United Soccer League affiliate team for Toronto FC. Because the stadium's expansion to include more seating fell through, the team announced it would be moving to play in BMO Field/Lamport Stadium for the 2018 season.

=== Media ===
==== Print ====
Vaughan's weekly newspaper the Vaughan Citizen was first published in 2001 and has a circulation of roughly 59,000. The neighbourhood of Thornhill has its own weekly paper, the Thornhill Liberal. From 1878 to 2000 Vaughan's news was covered by The Liberal published in Richmond Hill.

Lo Specchio is an Italian-language newspaper published in Vaughan since 1984.

City Life is a Vaughan-specific lifestyle magazine published bi-monthly by Dolce Publishing since 2003.

==== Film ====
Kleinburg was once home to the Cinespace Film Studios, a centre for television and motion picture production. The popular children's TV show The Forest Rangers, starring Gordon Pinsent, was filmed here between 1963 and 1965. In 2006, the movie The Sentinel was filmed at the McMichael Art Gallery.

More recently, Vaughan City Hall has served as a film location, when it was used as the new Red Center (the Rachel and Leah Center) in season 2 of Hulu's The Handmaid's Tale. It also served as the United Federation of Planets building and Office of the President in the season 1 finale of Star Trek: Discovery.

== Education ==
York University is located just outside of Vaughan in the North York district of Toronto on the south side of Steeles Avenue near Keele Street. It is a major comprehensive university, with more than 55,000 students enrolled in 11 faculties. The York University School of Medicine will open its door in the Vaughan Healthcare Centre Precinct just right beside Cortellucci Vaughan Hospital in 2028.

There are also a number of elementary and high schools in Vaughan, which operate under the York Region District School Board, the York Catholic District School Board, Conseil scolaire catholique MonAvenir (French-language Catholic schools) and Conseil scolaire Viamonde (French-language public schools). There is also a Waldorf school, the Toronto Waldorf School, which offers early childhood, elementary and accredited high school programs.

The American private Catholic Niagara University runs a branch campus in Vaughan, its first university in the city. The Ontario branch of Niagara University opened a 12,000 square foot facility at Expo City in downtown Vaughan. This campus will offer Master of Science in Education and Bachelor of Professional Studies in Education programs.

Thornhill's large Jewish population lead to the establishment of several Jewish schools in the area, including Associated Hebrew Schools (Kamin branch), Bialik Hebrew Day School (Himel brach), Ohr HaEmet Sephardic School, Eitz Chaim Schools (boys branch), Netivot HaTorah Day School, Yeshivas Ner Yisroel.

== Economy ==
Within the Greater Toronto Area, Vaughan is the third-largest employment center, after Toronto and Mississauga. With a real Gross Domestic Product (GDP) of $20.6 billion in 2018, it is the largest contributor (35%) to York Region's economy.

In 2018, the city was home to 12,105 businesses employing more than 222,000 people. Between 2008 and 2018, Vaughan's average annual employment growth was 3.2% and its business growth was 2.9%, exceeding provincial and national rates.

Manufacturing continues to dominate the local economy, accounting for 22% of total employment, followed by Construction (13%), Retail Trade (12%), Wholesale Trade (10%) and Transportation and Warehousing (6%). Small businesses with fewer than 20 employees account for 81% of all business establishments.

In 2018, the Accommodation and Food Services industry accounted for $295 million of Vaughan's real gross domestic product. Vaughan currently has 12 hotels and four motels with a total of 1,845 rooms. Development applications have been submitted that have the potential to add another 1,200 rooms to current supply in the coming years. Major tourism operators include Canada's Wonderland, Vaughan Mills, the McMichael Canadian Art Collection, the Kortright Centre for Conservation, LEGOLAND Discovery Centre, Reptilia, the mainstreet and village cores of Kleinburg, Thornhill, and Woodbridge.

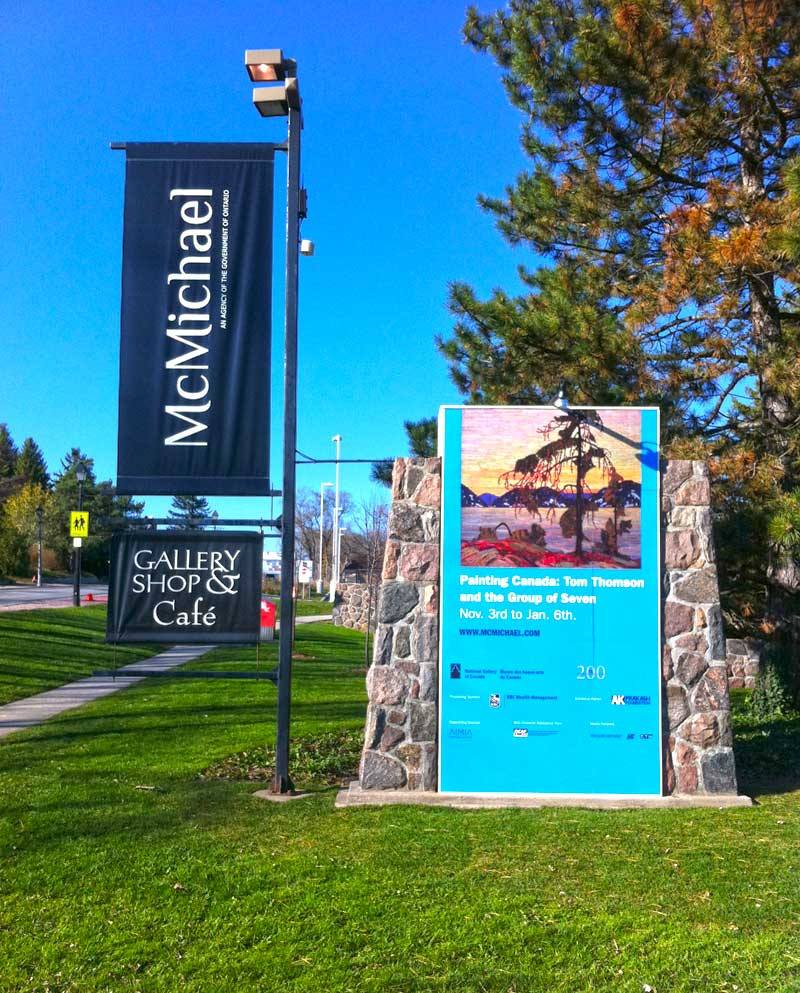
Entrance to McMichael Gallery in Kleinburg

Construction activity, as measured by value of building permits, has exceeded the $1 billion mark in eight of the last ten years.

As of 2018, the largest employers in Vaughan are:

- Canada's Wonderland
- United Parcel Service (UPS) Canada
- Canadian National Railway
- KPMG
- Bondfield Construction
- Ganz
- NPL Canada Ltd.
- Condrain Company Ltd.
- Ozz Electric
- Rollstamp Manufacturing

Vaughan is home to 184 Canadian or regional headquarters, including:

- Adidas Canada
- GFL Environmental
- Recipe Unlimited
- St. Joseph Communications
- Toys "R" Us
- Yum! Brands

== Archaeology ==
The Seed-Barker archeological site is a 16th-century Iroquoian village on the Humber River in Vaughan. It has been used as a summer school field trip site since 1976 by the Boyd archeological field summer school for high school students. The school is sponsored by the York Region district school board in co-operation with the Royal Ontario Museum and the Toronto and Region Conservation Authority (TRCA). In 1895, a local farmer began finding Iroquoian artifacts in the area. In 1895, Roland Orr recognized the classic ecological features favoured by the Iroquoian people for their villages: floodplains along a river, an easily defensible plateau and nearby forests. The Iroquoians used the floodplains to plant maize, beans and squash, known as the three sisters. In the 1950s, University of Toronto professor Norman Emerson and the students excavated artifacts from the Seed-Baker site. Since 1975, more than a million artifacts were discovered and nineteen longhouses were excavated revealing that the village was occupied by the Iroquoians from c. 1500 - 1550 AD.

== Notable people ==
=== Order of Vaughan ===
In 2016, to celebrate the city's 25th anniversary, Mayor Bevilacqua introduced the Order of Vaughan. This award is meant to be the highest honour bestowed by the city. Initially, 25 recipients were given the award as a reflection of the anniversary; however, the city announced in 2017 that up to ten new individuals would receive the award each year thereafter. The award is meant to recognize people in the categories of: accessibility, arts and entertainment, athletics, business, education, environment and spirituality, equity and diversity, health and wellness, media and communications, not-for-profit, philanthropy, public service, and science and technology.

== Twin cities ==
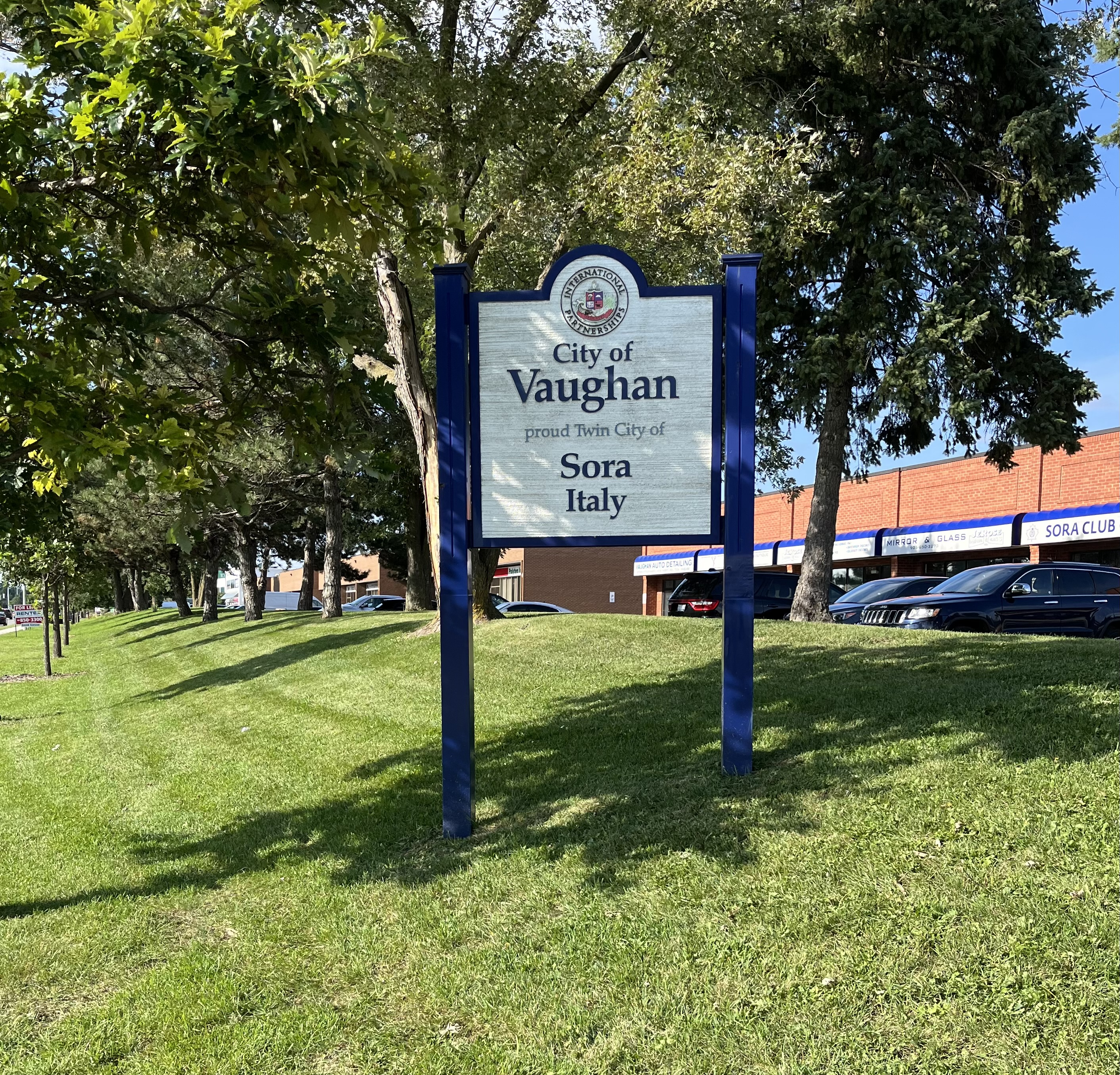
Twin city sign with Sora

- Sora, Italy (1992)
- Ramla, Israel (1993)
- Sanjō, Japan (1993)
- Yangzhou, China (1995)
- Baguio, Philippines (1997)
- Delia, Italy (1998)
- Lanciano, Italy (2002)

== See also ==
- List of townships in Ontario
- List of settlements in the Greater Toronto Area
