= Binder Twine Festival =

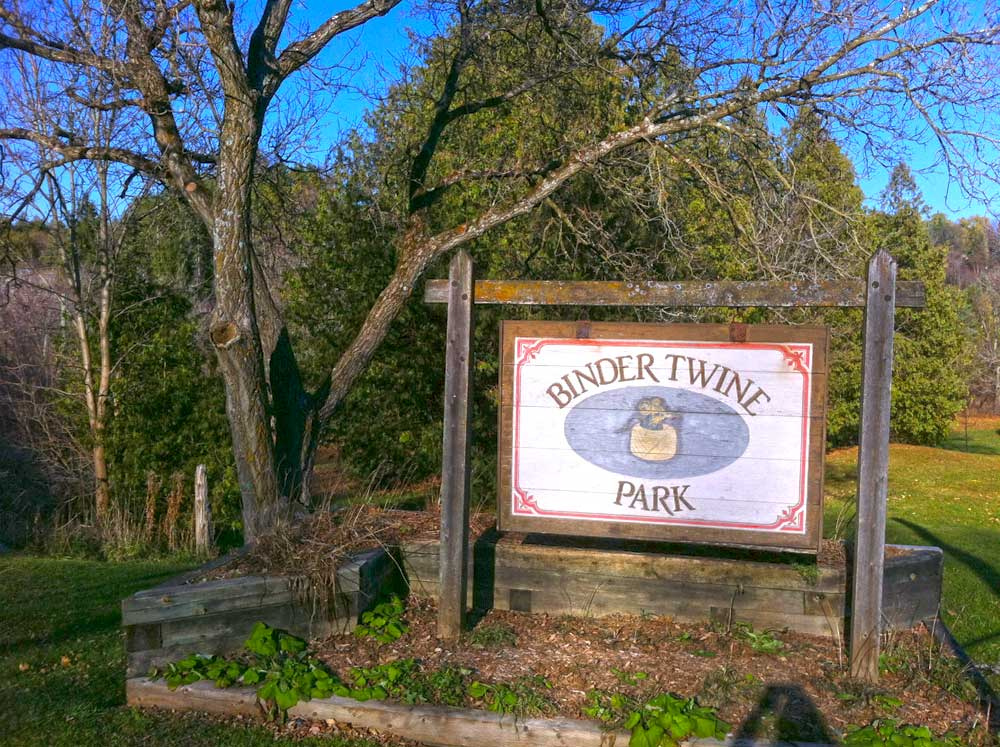
- Bindertwine Park in Kleinburg
- Status: Inactive
- Genre: Festival
- Frequency: Yearly, first Saturday after Labour Day
- Locations: Kleinburg, Ontario
- Country: Canada
- Years active: 52
- Inaugurated: 9 September 1967
- Founder: Committee of Kleinburg residents
- Most recent: 14 September 2019

The Binder Twine Festival, or usually Binder Twine, was an annual festival held the first Saturday after Labour Day in Kleinburg, Ontario, Canada. It was one of the most popular festivals in southern Ontario, and marked the beginning of the harvest fair season in the Greater Toronto Area. In April 2020, the committee that organized the festival announced that as a result of increased costs and decreasing number of volunteers, it would discontinue the festival.

In the late 19th century, farmers would come to the community to acquire binder twine with which they could bind sheaves of wheat. Charlie Shaw, a resident and owner of a hardware store, offered food and entertainment to those farmers, establishing the Binder Twine Night festival which was held annually until his death in the 1930s. In 1967, a committee of residents revived the concept as part of the Canadian Centennial celebrations.

The festival was organized and operated entirely by volunteers, which once included author Pierre Berton, a famous resident of the village. Berton's wife Janet was an executive of the organizing committee from 1967 until 1996, during which time she published 16 booklets about the history of Kleinburg. Binder Twine became a successful community event, and resulted in new town signage and the creation of Binder Twine Park.

There was a fee for admission except for those wearing pioneer period costumes, who were admitted for free.

== Activities ==
The festival featured the Binder Twine Parade, the Binder Twine Queen contest and a Quilt Raffle, along with craft sales and musical entertainment. The McMichael Canadian Art Collection sponsored art activities at the festival. It included an arts and craft show, pioneer skills demonstration, and "old-fashioned" entertainment.

In 1979, a few months after the federal election which resulted in Joe Clark becoming Prime Minister of Canada, festival organizers announced a Joe Clark look-alike contest, requesting entries from individuals with "an oversized head, large ears and hardly much of a chin".

=== Binder Twine Queen ===
The Binder Twine Queen contest required contestants to demonstrate their abilities in a set of activities such as cow milking, hog calling, and log sawing. Each year, one activity was kept secret until the day of the festival so contestants could not practice for it. Contestants wore costumes and often had props, including live animals, and "shamelessly spoof the traditional beauty contest". It had sometimes been judged by well-known personalities, including Knowlton Nash and Ben Wicks.

Berton wrote an article in the Toronto Star in 1992 comparing the Binder Twine Queen contest with beauty pageants, stating that "while other queen contests are fading away under the disapproving frowns of feminists, the Binder Twine Queen contest has never been healthier or more popular".
