= Pine Grove, Vaughan =

Pine Grove
- Neighbourhood
- Interactive map of Pine Grove
- Coordinates: 43°47′30″N 79°35′08″W
- Country: Canada
- Province: Ontario
- Regional Municipality: York
- City: Vaughan
- NTS Map: 030M13
- GNBC Code: FDSJU

Pine Grove is a neighbourhood of Vaughan, Ontario, Canada, in York Region. Originally a hamlet north of Woodbridge, it is now an enclave within that larger neighbourhood.

== History ==
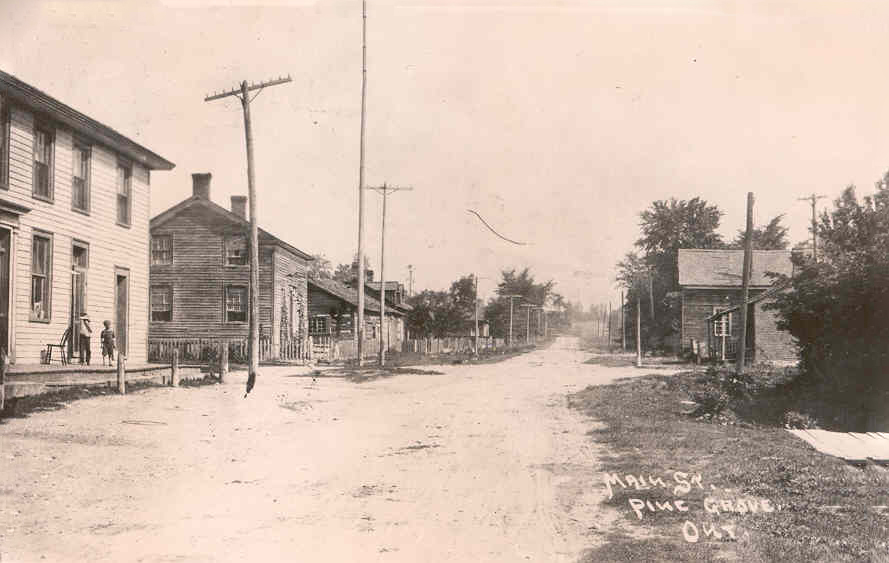
Islington Avenue (then locally named Main Street) in Pine Grove in 1870

The lands located on the east half of lots 9, 10 and 11 of concession 7 were first patented to David Thompson on May 20, 1801. By 1830, it was a well settled community. John Smith (Schmidt), a farmer from Edgeley, came to Pine Grove where he erected a grist mill and saw mill in 1828. In 1831 he built a store. In 1840 John Smith sold the mill to John W. Gamble who later became the first reeve of Vaughan Township. The mill was sold to Gooderham and Worts in 1860, and later to the Hayhoe family in 1935. By the time of Confederation, Pine Grove was home to a grist mill, churches, three hotels, a blacksmith shop, harness shops, a spool factory, one common school and a large general store with a post office. A stage coach ran daily to Weston.

On October 15, 1954, Pine Grove was hit by Hurricane Hazel. The flooding of the village along Islington Avenue destroyed several buildings and the mill dam.

On July 1, 2008, a major fire broke out at Hayhoe Mills, the last operating mill on the Humber River, resulting in the evacuation of nearby residents and its subsequent closure. The site was later redeveloped for residential use.
