= Kortright Centre for Conservation =

Suburban conservation area in Vaughan, Ontario, Canada

Coordinates: 43.83202°N 79.5912°W

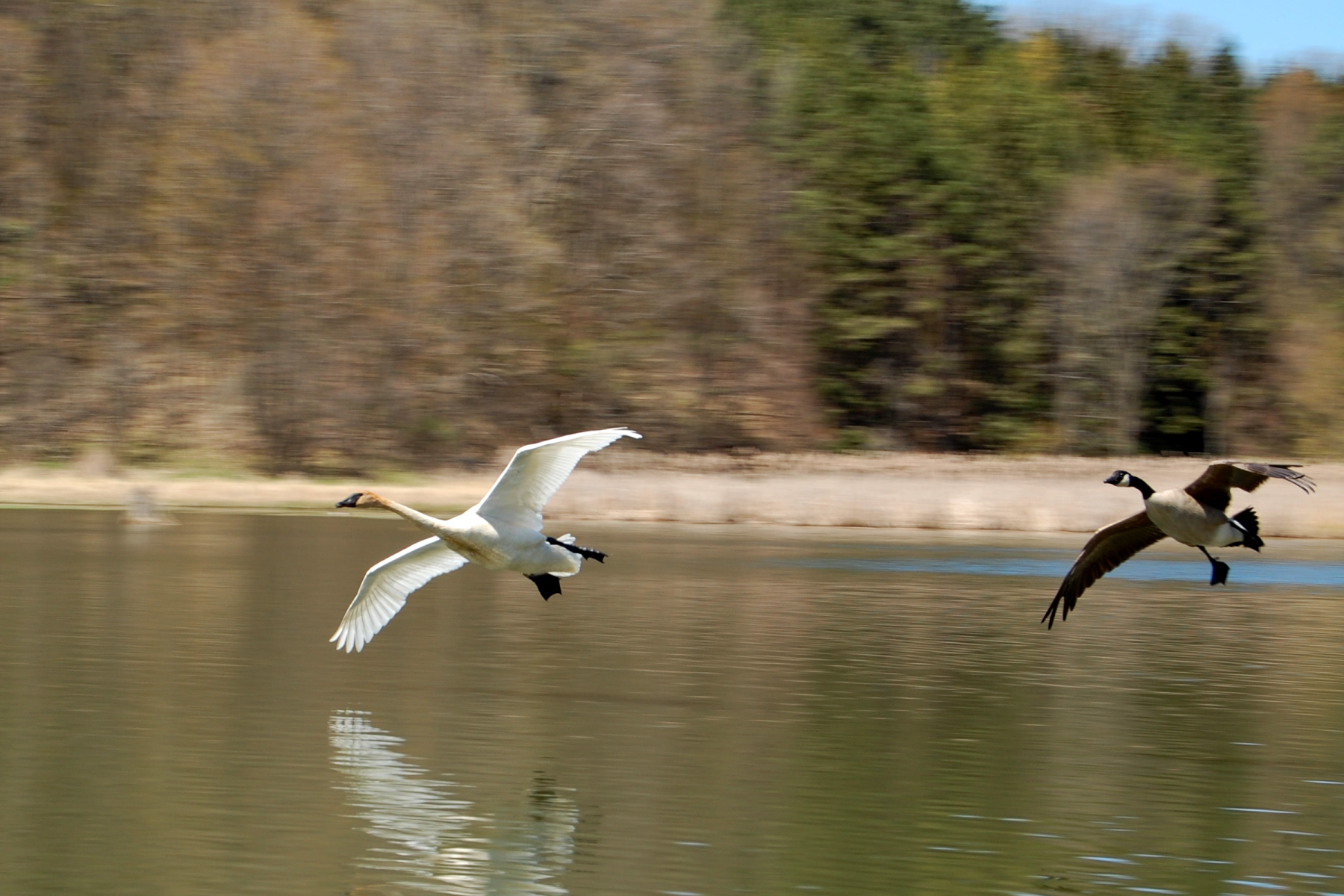
- Birds taking flight from a pond at the Kortright Centre.
- Interactive map of Kortright Centre for Conservation
- Nearest city: Vaughan
- Created: 1979
- Operator: Toronto and Region Conservation Authority
- Website: kortright.org

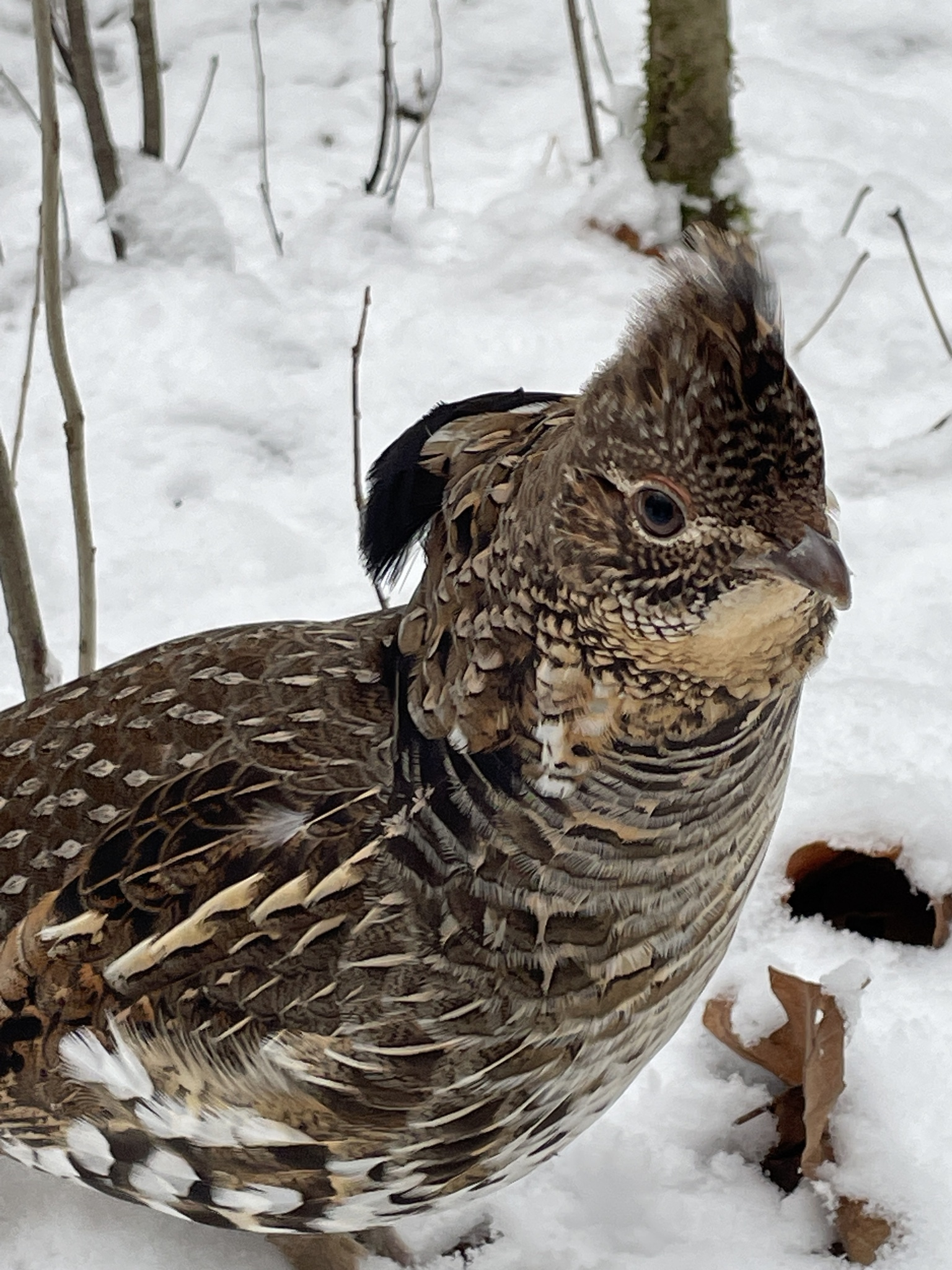
A male Ruffed Grouse at the Kortright Centre.

The Kortright Centre for Conservation is a suburban conservation area and educational facility in Vaughan, Ontario, Canada in the northern part of the Greater Toronto Area. It is operated by the Toronto and Region Conservation Authority. The area in which it is located is predominantly forested in its western and northern extent. The Humber River is situated in the west and the Cold Creek and Harris Creek are to the north.

The 325 hectare facility opened in 1979. There is a 16 km trail network for hiking and snowshoeing, a Visitor Centre, and several demonstration sites. Inside the Visitor Centre there is a gift shop, a theatre, and space for educational programs, weddings, and events. The access to the pathway leading to the syrup shacks is located at the northeast exit of the Visitor Centre. The Earth Rangers Centre is situated about 500 m south of the Visitor Centre.

The facility was used as the location of the Somafree Institute in David Cronenberg's film The Brood (1979).

The facility is named after Francis Kortright (1887–1972), an engineer, businessman, author and dedicated conservationist.

== Maple syrup ==
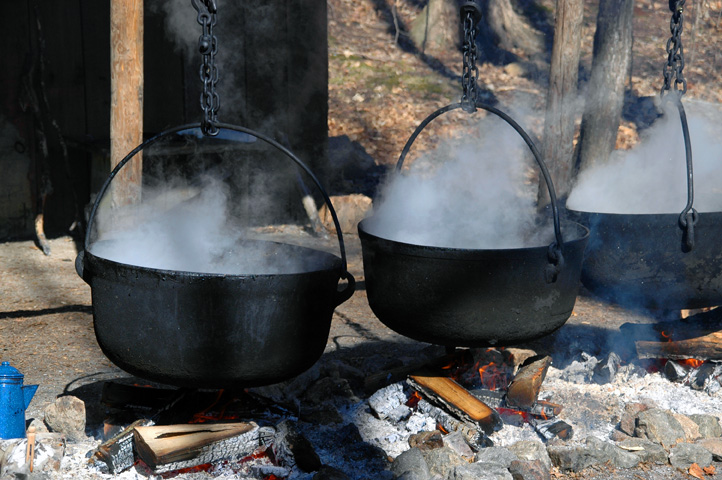
Maple syrup being prepared at the Kortright Centre.

Between March and mid-April, the Kortright Centre for Conservation hosts its annual Maple Syrup Festival. The focus of the Maple Syrup Festival is to educate the public on how Maple Syrup production has changed over time. Demonstrations are given on how to properly identify a maple tree, how First Nations people cooked sweet water, how European settlers brought over kettles for cooking, and how maple syrup is made today in a modern sugar shack.
