= Dizdar (surname) =

Dizdar is a Bosniak and Turkish surname derived from the Ottoman title of Dizdar. Notable people with the surname include:

- Adnan Dizdar (born 1949), Yugoslav handball player
- Can Dizdar, Turkish diplomat
- Ece Dizdar (born 1981), Turkish actress
- Hamid Dizdar (1907–1967), Bosnian writer
- Jasmin Dizdar (born 1961), British-Bosnian director and author
- Mak Dizdar (1917–1971), Bosnian poet
- Merve Dizdar (born 1986), Turkish actress
- Natali Dizdar (born 1984), Croatian singer
- Petra Dizdar (born 1984), Croatian tennis player
- Şefik Yılmaz Dizdar (born 1939), Turkish businessman
- Zdravko Dizdar (born 1948), Croatian historian
- Zeynep Dizdar (born 1976), Turkish singer-songwriter and composer
