= Nile Academy =

Coordinates: 43.7446°N 79.5582°W

- Nil Akademi

Location
- 5 Blue Haven Crescent, Toronto, Ontario, M9M 1W6

Information
- Type: Private day school
- Motto: Excellence in Education and Ethics
- Opened: 2005
- Status: Open/Active
- Principal: Mr. Esat Gokce
- Grades: K-12
- Gender: Co-ed
- Enrollment: 300
- Average class size: 15-18
- Colors: Light Blue and Orange
- Team name: Nile Leopards
- Annual tuition: $8,000-$28,500
- Website: https://nileacademy.ca/

Nile Academy (Turkish: Nil Akademi) (Nicknamed "Okul"; lit. "School" in Turkish), located in the Humber Summit neighbourhood of Toronto, Ontario, is a Canadian private school for students between Kindergarten and Grade Twelve. Originally founded in 2005 by Muslim Turkish immigrants belonging to the Hizmet Movement in order to better serve the growing Turkish-Canadian community, the school now has a wide range of students from a variety of backgrounds.

== Campuses ==
At one point, Nile Academy had three campuses; one boys' school (Plunkett Campus), one girls' high school with co-ed K-8 (Blue Haven Campus), and one elementary school (Scarborough Campus). However, the Plunkett and Scarborough Campuses were shut down, and consecutively merged with the Blue Haven Campus in 2016 to form a single school on a single campus.

== Extracurricular activities ==
Nile Academy actively competes in regional student competitions in sports, mathematics, robotics, and the sciences, in tournaments such as OFSAA and the Toronto Science Fair, among others. Nile Academy also offers supplementary programs for chess, fine arts, water marbling, drama, choir, guitar, violin, and wrestling. The school is part of the Toronto District College Athletic Association, even though it is not a Catholic school or part of the TCSDB.

== Partnerships and affiliated organizations ==
The school is funded by the followers and business partners of the Hizmet Movement. The school also partners with organizations and non-profits such as the Anatolian Heritage Federation, the Northern Lights Relief Foundation (Turkish: Kanada Kuzey Işıkları Yardım Vakfı), the Dicle Islamic Society, the Anatolian Cultural Centre, the Intercultural Dialogue Institute, and various governmental organizations of Canada such as the Toronto Police Services. The school is a strong supporter of intercultural dialogue and humanitarianism, and has sent many expeditions to countries in Africa and the West Indies.
