= Turkish Canadians =

Canadians of Turkish descent

Turkish Canadians Kanada'daki Türkler
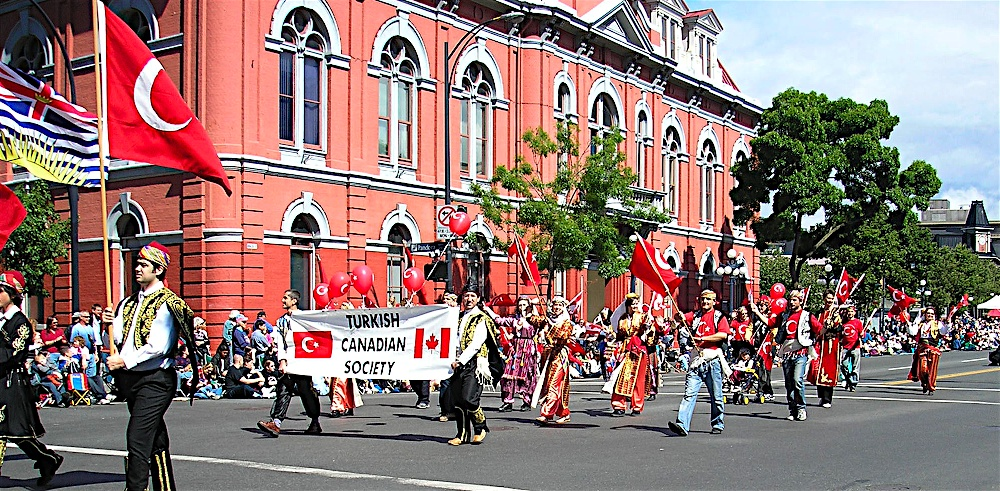
- Turkish Canadians at the Victoria Day Parade in 2005

Total population
- 76,745 (by ancestry, 2021 Census) Over 100,000 Turkish Canadians (2018 estimate by Canadian Ambassador Chris Cooter)

Regions with significant populations
- Toronto; Montreal; Vancouver; London; Ottawa; Calgary; Edmonton

Languages
- Turkish; Canadian English; Canadian French

Religion
- Predominantly Sunni Islam; Minority Alevism, other religions, or irreligious

Turkish Canadians (Turkish: Türk asıllı Kanadalılar; literally "Turkish-originating Canadians"), also called Canadian Turks (Turkish: Kanadalı Türkler), are Canadians of Turkish descent. The majority descend from the Republic of Turkey and minorities from other post-Ottoman Empire states, including the Balkans (Bulgaria, Greece, Kosovo, North Macedonia and Romania), the island of Cyprus, the Levant (Iraq, Lebanon and Syria) and North Africa (especially Egypt).

== History ==
Turkish people first began to immigrate to Canada in small numbers from the Ottoman Empire, and significantly in the late 1950s and early 1960s when the Turkish government encouraged student education abroad. There have also been Turks fleeing from unrest and oppression in Bulgaria and Cyprus who arrived in Canada as political and economic refugees.

=== Migration from the Ottoman Empire ===
In 1901, Canada had between 300–400 Muslim residents, equally divided between Turks and Syrian Arabs. By 1911, the size of the Muslim community had increased to about 1,500, of whom 1,000 were of Turkish origin and the remainder were Arabs. During the pre-World War I period, Turks were to be found in mining and logging camps across Canada. Due to poor relations between the Ottomans and Allied Powers of WWI, further migration was made difficult for the Turks and the Canadian government discouraged "Asian" immigration. Thus, by the onset of World War I, Canada witnessed the return of many Turkish immigrants who were then classified as "enemy aliens". Another reason for the return-migration of Ottoman Turks was because for the majority of Turks, the founding of the new republic of Turkey in 1923 was a greater incentive to stay at home.

With the Canadian Immigration Act of 1910, immigrating to the country was banned. This policy wasn't changed until 1978. The reason behind this xenophobic act was the government’s claim that immigrants were hard to assimilate. The 1919, 14 March Act banned people of German, Hungarian, Bulgarian, Austrian and Turkish backgrounds from immigrating to Canada, except if the Minister of Immigration didn't give special permission. This prohibition was strictly racial and wasn’t related to Enemy Alien prohibition. This nativism lasted four years till the ban was lifted because the Canadian economy needed cheap immigrant labour.

=== Internment of 1914 ===
The Ottoman Empire declared war on Britain in November 5, 1914. Only five days later, on November 10, 1914, 98 Turks were deported and settled in Kingston and then in Kapuskasing. Their number increased over time. They weren’t the only “enemy aliens” subjected to internment. More than 8,500 people were placed in 24 camps during the war. Of them 205 were Turks. Most were from the Eastern Anatolia region's Harput. Many foreigners have been interned for wanting to leave Canada, which in the eyes of the government posed a threat. Others were sent to the camps because they had suspicious activities. The number of these foreigners was not small at all — they numbered 393,320. 3,880 of them were from the Ottoman Empire.

According to the newspapers, the reason for the detention of the Turks was the government's desire to protect 400 Armenians living in Brantford, where the majority of the Turkish population was concentrated. The Armenians were worried that the Turks would attack them. It is possible that a letter from the Armenian missionary of Brantford, Armen Amirkhanian, influenced the city council. He wrote to Brantford City Council, claiming that Armenians were loyal to Britain, and that they were not ethnic Turks. He also mentioned the massacres that took place, and that the Armenians suffered a lot because of the Turks. His letter showed results and news of Armenians loyal to Britain that appearеd in the newspapers. According to other newspapers, Turks in the city had tried to bomb a newly created post office. The truth of this statement is debatable, as many Turks in Canada couldn't even read or write.

Apart from ethnic Armenians, other Ottoman citizens, such as the Orthodox Macedonians and Greeks were also not deported. Also, many of these Turks left Eastern Anatolia to earn enough money to buy land in their homeland and live in their native places. Despite these misunderstandings, the Armenian community, also from Harput, tried to help these Turks. Even the Turks in America, Massachusetts, hired two lawyers to bring the Canadian Turks to America, but their attempts were unsuccessful. Although Turkey, as soon as it learned of what was happening, tried to help its compatriots, its attempts were unsuccessful, especially after the Turks were banned from sending letters to the Ottoman Empire, even to their families, on November 25.

At least three of those detained died, two went insane, six returned to Turkey and 43 remained in Canada. Another part immigrated to America, Michigan, where they worked in the Ford factory. The name of one of the dead is Alex Hassan, whose real name is most likely Ali Hassan, but the Canadians changed his name for easier pronunciation. They served in the construction of the camp in which they remained. But some of them were later released, with the obligation to work, as during the war, the economy of factories increased and the government needed manpower. The names of some of 16 Muslims in Mount Hope Cemetery are believed to belong to them. Five of them died in 1916 and 1918. In 2014, the Turkish consul of Canada visited the cemetery. Some people, especially the Canadian-Armenian community had claimed that it is a political act and created online petition to “stop the fake monument”.

The Muslim plot of the Mount Hope cemetery exists since 1912 and seven names belong to men that died before the 1914 events. Many added that before a century, everyone in the Ottoman empire was known as “Turk”. Seven of the graves belonged to men that died before the 1914 events. These actions tried to prevent a memorial plaque describing the events of 1914 from being erected on the site. According to an Armenian, “identifying (those buried in the plot) with Turkey and the Turkish government would be an injustice.” He also claimed that the buried people are actually Alevi Muslims, “the idea of having a monument endorsed by the Turkish government that incorrectly labels Alevi as though they were Turks is a “real injustice”, For many this was a Turcophobic act. There were claims that this was similar to the Armenian genocide denial. Barçın Yinanç wrote "it would have been much wiser to come and attend the ceremony and perhaps give messages or letters to the Turkish ambassador, asking the Turkish state to show the same sensitivity to the thousands of dead Armenians".

=== Migration from the Republic of Turkey ===
In the late 1950s and early 1960s, the government of Turkey encouraged and financially supported Turkish students to study in Canada. Thus, the early 1960s consisted primarily of students and professionals, especially doctors and engineers. Significant Turkish immigration began during the 1960s and 1970s; most Turks went to Canada for educational and economic opportunities. According to the 1972 Canada census there were 9,342 Turkish-born persons living in Canada.

=== Migration from the Balkans ===
==== Bulgaria ====
In the 1980s Turkish Bulgarians were fleeing from the Bulgarisation policies, known as the so-called "Revival Process", which targeted the Turkish minority group; consequently, many arrived in Canada as refugees. In addition, Turkish Bulgarian refugees who had originally settled in Sweden and then returned to Bulgaria in the 1990s were forced to flee again and sought life in Western countries such as Canada, England, the United States, Turkey and Germany.

==== Greece ====
There have been several waves of migration from the Turkish minority of Western Thrace to Canada. The first wave of Turkish Western Thracian migration started in the 1960s and intensified between 1970-2010 due to political and economic reasons; this was followed by a significantly larger wave in 2010-18 due to the Greek government-debt crisis.

==== Romania ====
According to Dr Eleanor Bujea, the early history of Turkish Romanians in Canada (which began in the 1910s) is similar to that of Jewish Romanians. Many initially homesteaded and raised their families on farms whilst some went into the grocery businesses or opened street carts. After the First World War, many of these people moved to large cities where some intermarried and assimilated.

=== Migration from the Levant ===
==== Cyprus ====
During the 1950s, Turkish Cypriots started to leave Cyprus for political reasons when the Greek Cypriots held a referendum in which 95.7% of Greek Cypriots supported enosis, the union of Cyprus with Greece. By 1963, inter-ethnic fighting broke out in Cyprus, with Turkish Cypriots bearing the heavier cost in terms of casualties and some 25,000 Turkish Cypriots became internally displaced accounting to about a fifth of their population. Tension continued to grow by the late 1960s and approximately 60,000 Turkish Cypriots left their homes and moved into enclaves due to intercommunal violence, fearing their safety as the minority on the island. This resulted in an exodus of more Turkish Cypriots from the island, many migrating to Canada.

==== Iraq ====
In 2010 there was approximately 1,000 Iraqi Turks living in Canada.

==== Syria ====
Since Justin Trudeau was elected as Prime Minister of Canada in 2015, over 25,000 Syrian refugees have settled in Canada; these have included Arabs, Syrian Kurds and Syrian Turks as well as other minority groups.

== Demographics ==
=== Official data ===
The following is the number of people who have voluntarily declared their ethnicity as "Turkish" in official censuses. The actual number of Turkish Canadians is believed to be considerably higher.

Rank	Provinces/territories	Population (2001 census)	Population (2006 census)	Population (2016 census)
1	Ontario	14,580	23,425	34,165
2	Quebec	5,680	11,390	15,060
3	British Columbia	2,395	4,250	6,355
4	Alberta	1,515	2,970	5,745
5	Nova Scotia	190	425	690
6	Saskatchewan	105	400	860
7	Manitoba	275	345	655
8	New Brunswick	125	275	235
9	Newfoundland and Labrador	35	135	100
10	Northwest Territories	10	65	15
11	Yukon	0	10	30
12	Nunavut	0 (10 Multiple responses)	0	15
13	Prince Edward Island	0	0	35
Total	Canada	24,910	43,700	63,955
(Source: 2001, 2006 and 2016 Canadian Census')

=== Estimated population ===
In 2018 the Canadian Ambassador, Chris Cooter, said that there was approximately 100,000 Turkish Canadians living in the country, as well as several thousand Turkish students:

We have a growing Turkish diaspora and they’re doing very well in Canada. We think it’s 100,000, largely in Toronto. We have several thousand Turkish students in Canada as well. We are trying to make sure that two-way relationship is growing. – Canadian Ambassador Chris Cooter (2018)

In 2019 the "Federation of Chinese Canadians in Markham" also reported that there was over 100,000 Turkish Canadians in the country.

== Culture ==
=== Religion ===
The majority of Turkish Canadians are Sunnis with minorities being Alevis and people generally do not have any religious affiliation. Prior to 1980, Turkish Canadian immigrants were from urban areas and secular backgrounds. Religion remained an affair of the private conscience. In May 1983, the Canadian Turkish Islamic Heritage Association (Kanada Türk İslam Kültür Derneği) was established, followed by the Canadian Turkish Islamic Trust (Kanada Türk İslam Vakfı) in April 1987.

=== Festivals ===
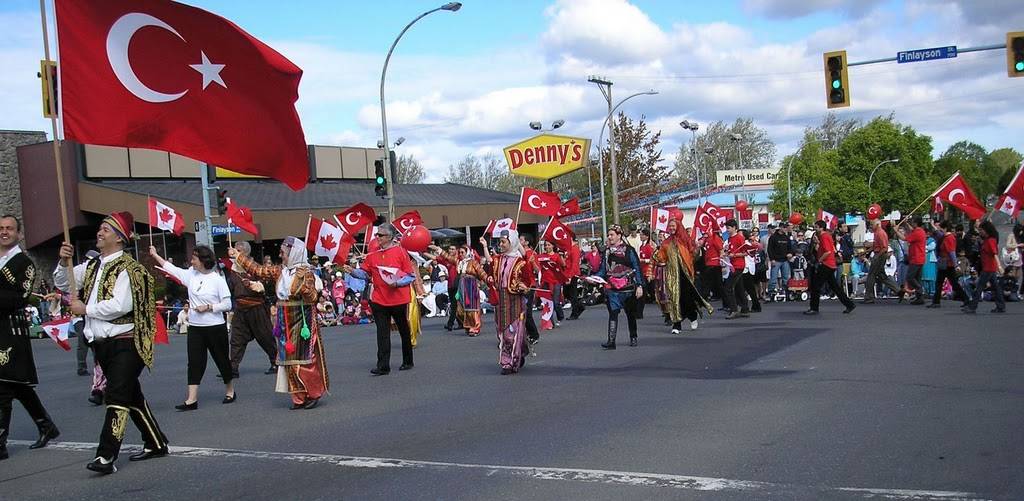
Turkish Canadians march in the 2007 Victoria Day parade in Victoria, British Columbia

- The Toronto Turkish Festival
- The Calgary Turkish Festival
- The Edmonton Turkish Festival
- The Ottawa Turkish Festival

=== Language ===
Turkish Canadians are generally fluent in Turkish, but may speak an Anglicized dialect, slang, or version, informally called "Türkilizce". This unofficial, informal dialect is common among younger Canadian Turks, and is characterized by the addition of English loanwords to otherwise completely Turkish conversations (for example, the Turkish translation of "to schedule" would be "tarih belirlemek", but a Türkilizce speaker would say "schedule etmek").

== Media ==
=== Social media ===
- Turkish Association of Canada
- Anatolian Heritage Foundation
- Intercultural Dialogue Institute
- Toronto Bilgi

=== Newspapers ===
- Canadaturk
- Referans
- Idinews
- Bizim Anadolu
- Canatolian

=== Television ===
- Turkuaz TV

=== Radio ===
- Radio Perfect

== Sports ==
- Atak Sports - Zafer Biryol Soccer Academy

== Education ==
Since 2005, Nile Academy, a private, secular school run by Turkish administration linked to a nonprofit organization called Canadian Turkish Friendship Community, has grown exponentially over the years. Within eleven years, they managed to open their 3rd school within Ontario. They have also opened a dormitory located near Jane Street and Eglinton Avenue West, Toronto. Throughout the years, Nile Academy has competed in Turkish Language Olympiads and many wrestling tournaments in Ontario.

In the mid 2010s, Nile Academy closed its main dormitory, and merged its three campuses into a single one, located in the Humber Summit neighbourhood of Toronto.

Nile Academy is also linked with the Islamic cleric, author, and scholar, Fethullah Gülen as well as the Gülen Movement. They have had many notable alumni since they opened in 2005.

== Associations ==
Since the 1960s, many community organizations have appeared representing various groups of Turkish immigrants. The various associations across Canada are currently represented by the "Federation of Canadian Turkish Associations", an umbrella organization founded in the mid-1980s. The federation serves as a referral and communications centre for news of Turkey, local events, business and governmental inquiries, and intergroup relations. More recently, a similar Turkish Cypriot umbrella group, the "Federation of Turkish Cypriot Associations of Canada", was established; the "Canadian Association for Solidarity of Turks from Bulgaria" also forms part of the federation.

The Federation of Canadian Turkish Associations is an umbrella organization representing 17 member associations from Victoria to Quebec, which include approximately 50,000 Canadians of Turkish origin. The federation was established in 1985 and is a non-profit organization with no political affiliations. It supports and encourages activities that deal with important cultural, economic, educational, historical, social and religious issues that relate to the Turkish community in Canada.

- Anatolian Heritage Federation
- Ankara Library
- Association of Balkan Canadians
- Association of Canadian Turkish Cypriots
- Canadian Alevi Culture Centre
- Canadian Association for Solidarity of Turks from Bulgaria
- Canadian Iraqi Turkmen Culture Association of London
- Canadian Turkish Cultural Association of Hamilton
- Canadian Turkish Film Society
- Canadian Turkish Islamic Heritage Association INC.
- Council of Turkish Canadians
- The Federation of Canadian Turkish Associations
- Intercultural Dialogue Institute
- K-W Turkish cultural association
- Turkish Association of Canada (TAC)
- The Turkish Canadian Association of London
- Turkish Canadian Cultural Association
- Turkish Canadian Cultural Association of Calgary
- Turkish Canadian Society
- Turkish Canadian Society of Edmonton
- Turkish Canadian Society of Vancouver
- The Turkish Community Heritage Centre of Canada
- Turkish Federation Community Foundation
- Turkish Culture and Folklore Society
- The Turkish Quebec Cultural and Friendship Association
- Turkish Society of Canada
- Turkish Society of Nova Scotia
- The United Canadian Muslim Association
- United Canadian Turkish Cultural Association

== See also ==
- Canada–Turkey relations
- Canadians in Turkey
- Embassy of Turkey in Ottawa
- Doner kebab
- Middle Eastern Canadians
- West Asian Canadians
- Turkish diaspora
  - British Turks
  - Turkish Americans
  - Turkish Australians
  - Turkish New Zealanders

== Bibliography ==
- Abu-Laban, Baha (1983), "The Canadian Muslim Community: The Need for a New Survival Strategy", in Waugh, Earle H.; Abu-Laban, Baha; Abu-Qureshi, Regula (eds.), The Muslim Community in North America, University of Alberta, ISBN 0-88864-034-X.
- Aksan, Virginia H. (1999), "Turks", in Magocsi, Paul R. (ed.), Encyclopedia of Canada's Peoples, University of Toronto Press, ISBN 0-8020-2938-8.
- Cassia, Paul Sant (2007), Bodies of Evidence: Burial, Memory, and the Recovery of Missing Persons in Cyprus, Berghahn Books, ISBN 978-1-84545-228-5.
- Karpat, Kemal H. (2004), "Turkish Immigration to Canada", Studies on Turkish Politics and Society: Selected Articles and Essays, BRILL, ISBN 90-04-13322-4
- Ozcurumez, Saime (2009), "Immigrant Associations in Canada:Included, Accommodated, or Excluded?", Turkish Studies, 10 (2), Routledge: 195–215, doi:10.1080/14683840902864002, hdl:11693/22731, S2CID 102340088
- Papadakis, Yiannis; Peristianis, Nicos; Welz, Gisela (2006), Divided Cyprus: Modernity, History, and an Island in Conflict, Bloomington: Indiana University Press, ISBN 0-253-21851-9.
- Powell, John (2005), "Turkish Immigration", Encyclopedia of North American Immigration, Infobase Publishing, ISBN 0-8160-4658-1
- Tocci, Nathalie (2004), EU accession dynamics and conflict resolution: catalysing peace or consolidating partition in Cyprus?, Ashgate Publishing, ISBN 0-7546-4310-7.
