= Woodbridge, Ontario =

Woodbridge
- Suburban district
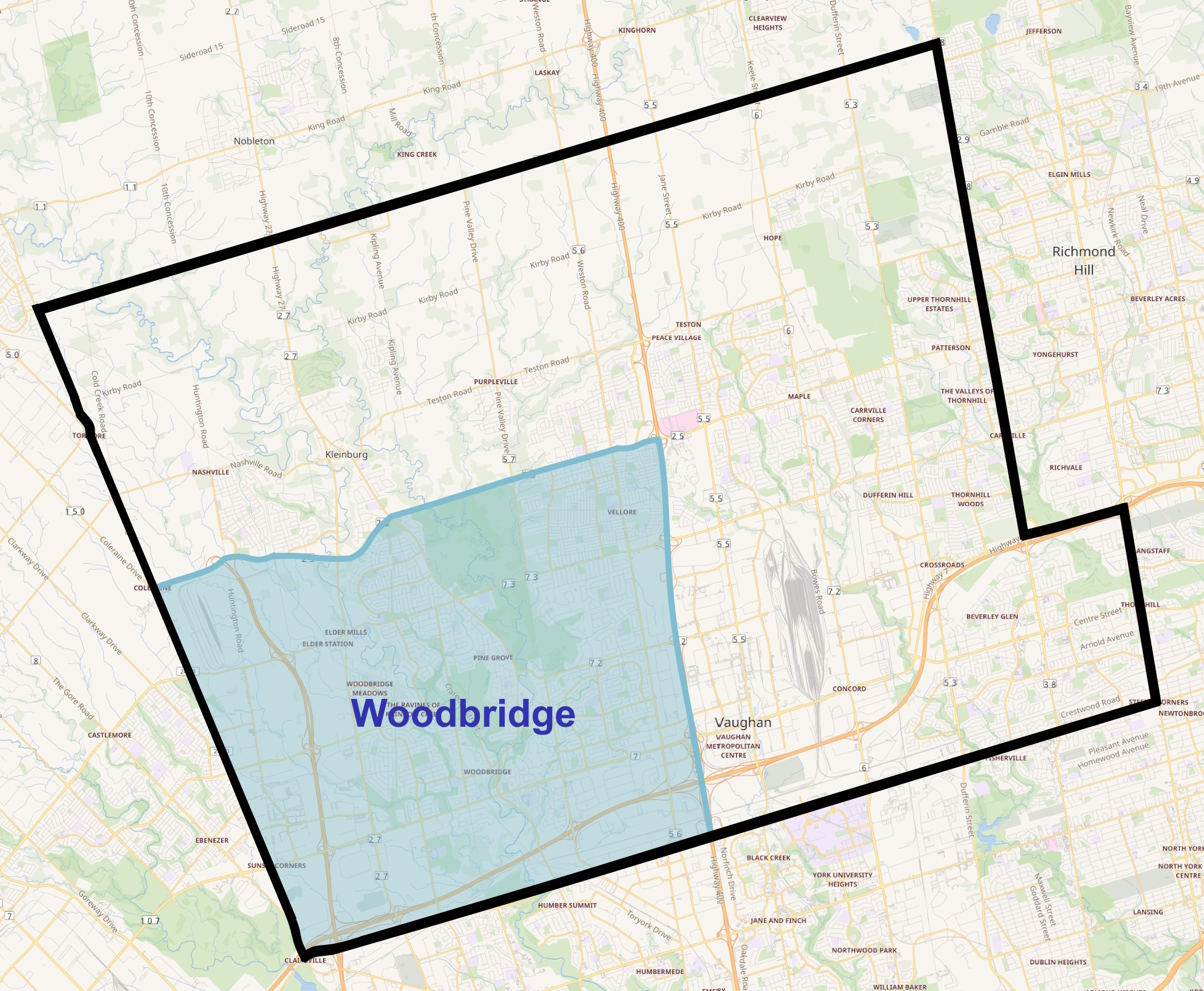
- Woodbridge within Vaughan (boundaries approximate)
- Coordinates: 43°47′06.23″N 079°35′35.95″W
- Country: Canada
- Province: Ontario
- Regional Municipality: York
- City: Vaughan
- Settled: 1802
- Incorporated: 1882 (Village)
- Changed Division: 1971 York Region from York County
- Amalgamated: 1971 into Vaughan (as Town) 1990 (as City)

Government
  - MP: Michael Guglielmin (Vaughan—Woodbridge)
  - MPP: Michael Tibollo (Vaughan-Woodbridge)
  - Councillors: Adriano Volpentesta (Ward 2); Rosanna DeFrancesca (Ward 3)

Area
  - Total: 79.59 km^{2} (30.73 sq mi)

Population (2021)
  - Total: 106,810
  - Density: 1,341.9/km^{2} (3,476/sq mi)
- Postal codes: L3L, L4H, L4L

Woodbridge is a very large suburban community in Vaughan, Ontario, Canada, along the city's border with Toronto. It occupies the city's entire southwest quadrant, west of Highway 400, east of Highway 50, north of Steeles Avenue, and generally south of Major Mackenzie Drive. It was once an independent village before being amalgamated with nearby communities to form the city in 1971. Its traditional downtown core is the Woodbridge Avenue stretch between Islington Avenue and Kipling Avenue north of Highway 7.

== Early history ==
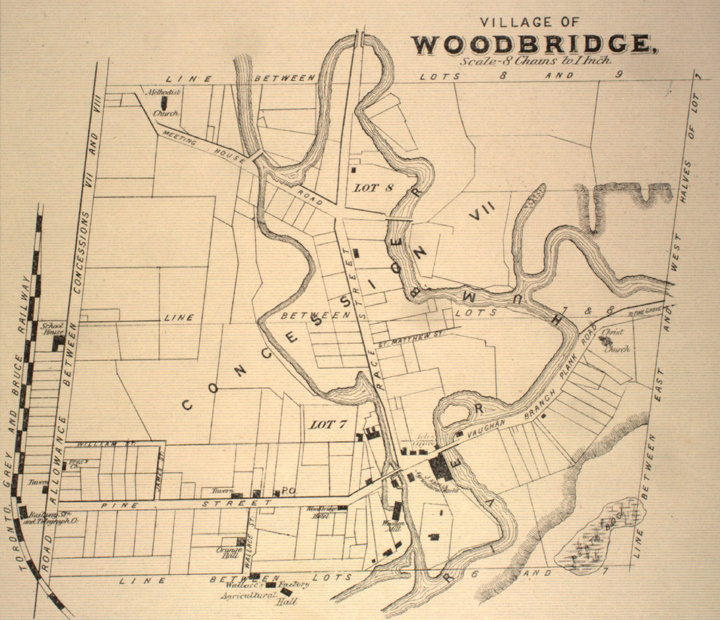
A map of the Village of Woodbridge from 1878, prominently showing the Humber River. Also visible is the Toronto, Grey and Bruce Railway.

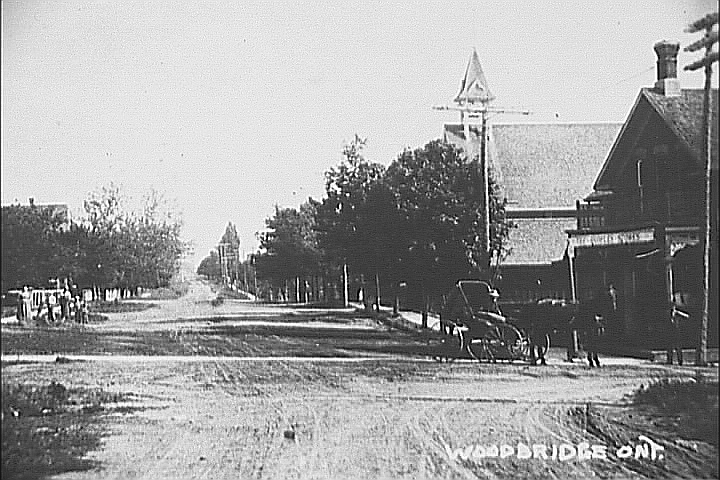
Eighth Avenue (now Kipling Avenue) c. 1850 (above) and 1955 (below)

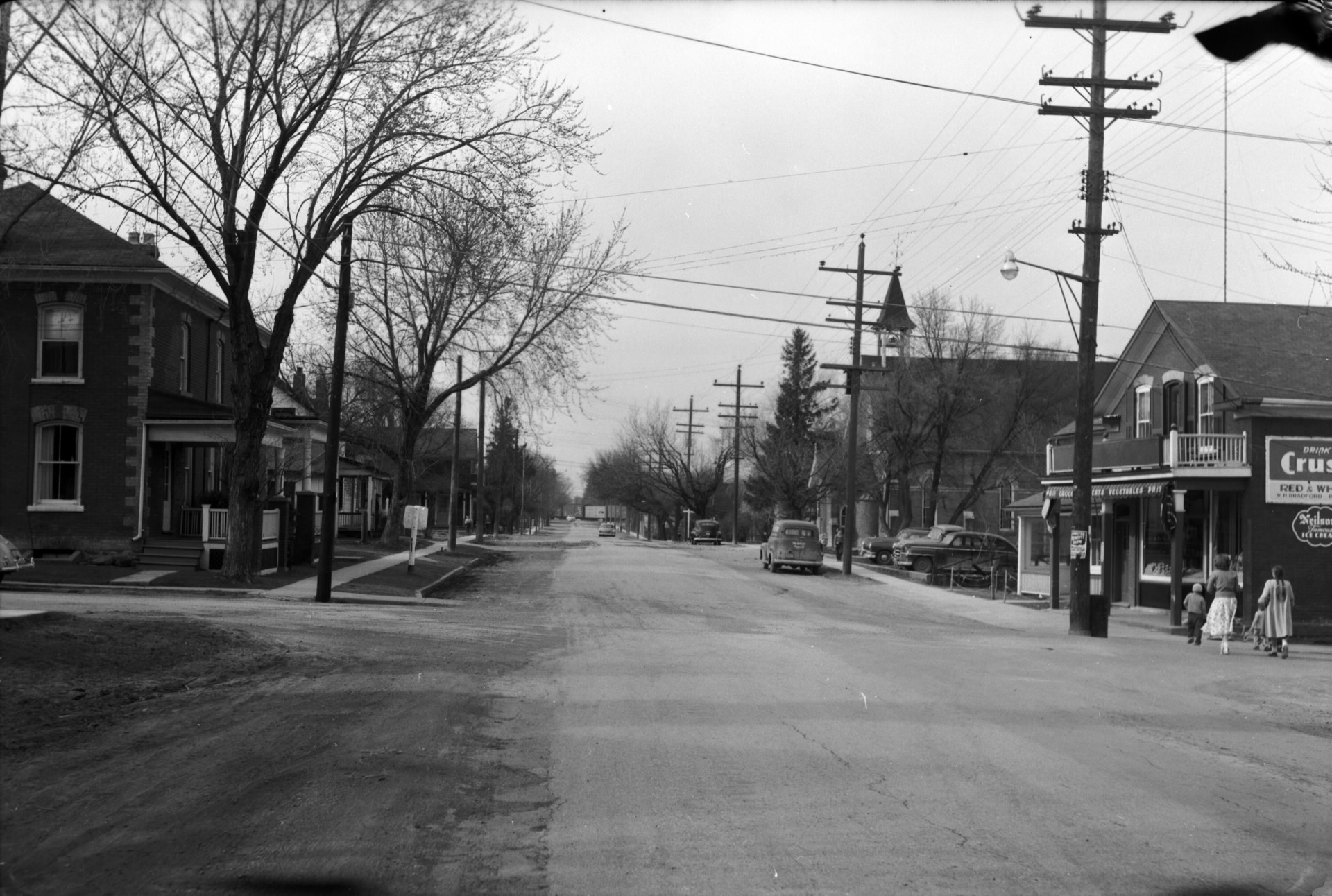

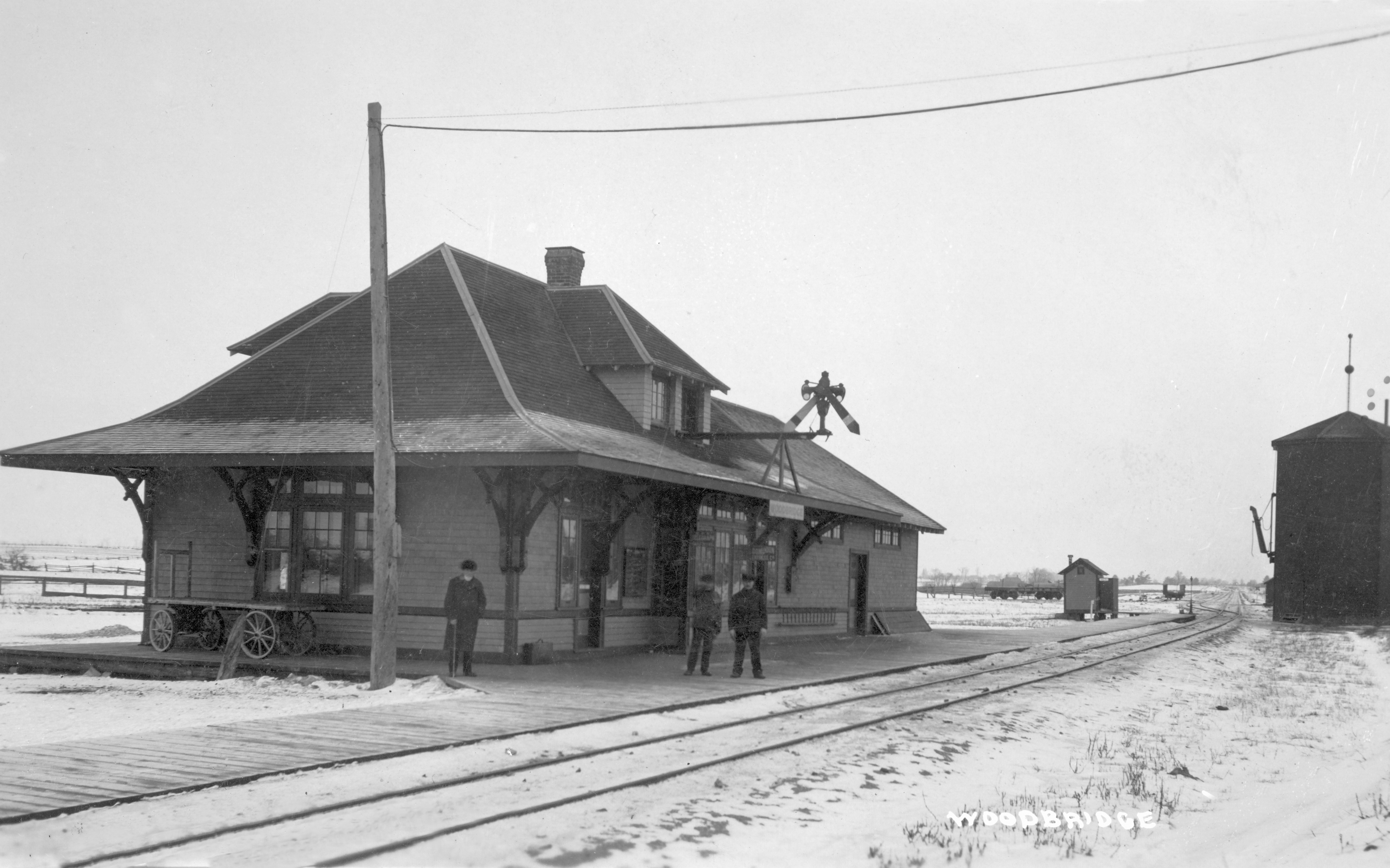
CPR Woodbridge station, circa 1910

Barn raising near present-day Highway 27 and Langstaff Road

The community had its origins with the British Crown granting the west half of lots six and seven, concession 7 of Vaughan Township to Jacob Philips and Hugh Cameron in 1802. Woodbridge had its beginnings in what is today Pine Grove. During the early half the 19th century, a school was built on Vaughan's eighth concession; and a flour mill and store flourished. A scattering of houses arose around Smith's mill (later Hayhoe Mills), Smith's mill later became known as Smithsville, and then Pine Grove. Another nearby settlement to the south, known as Brownsville, came into being around a mill run by John Brown on the Humber River at present-day Highway 7 and Islington Avenue, south of the original Woodbridge village.

Woodbridge itself, however, did not begin to take the form of a settlement or village until the arrival of Rowland Burr in 1837, a local highly regarded architect and builder at the time. He moved there from Richmond Hill to reside in a log house in the growing village near the Humber River, and purchased 100 acres and mill water rights from Washington Peck, a local cooper. He proceeded to build a flour mill, then later a sawmill and woolen mill on the land, and laid out a proper plan for the village that was named "Burwick" after him. He later moved south down the Humber to Weston in 1846.

Before 1855, Woodbridge had been known as the village of Burwick, but was renamed because when the town applied for a post office that year, there was already a settlement named Burwick in the province. The name "Woodbridge" was put forward by the son-in-law of John Gamble (reeve of Vaughan at the time) after his home town in England. It was also suitable due to the many bridges in the area across the Humber River. After it was incorporated in 1882, Woodbridge eventually overtook, and later included, nearby Pine Grove. Brownsville also became part of Woodbridge.

John Abell was another notable early entrepreneurial figure that shaped the village of Burwick/Woodbridge, settling there in 1845. He initially started with manufacturing carriages and wagons. In 1847, he initially opened a foundry for manufacturing mill irons. In 1862, Abell opened the Abell Agricultural Works foundry, that became a major industry over time and had 200 employees by 1874, making steam-powered agricultural equipment like traction engines. Due to problems not being able to get a railway siding from the nearby Toronto, Grey & Bruce Railway to his factory, in 1885 he left Woodbridge and relocated his manufacturing operations to Queen & Abell Streets in Toronto, which was a blow to the village at the time. The building, south of Woodbridge Ave. and west of the Humber River, became Edwards & Edwards tannery in 1919, but was destroyed by fire in 1926. Part of the remaining plant was rebuilt and became the S.C. William Rubber Company in 1935, later M.L. Snyder & Son (rubber manufacturing).

The Toronto, Grey and Bruce Railway arrived from Weston in 1870. This line was constructed as a narrow gauge railway through Caledon and completed to Owen Sound in 1873. Owing to financial difficulty, it was operated by the Grand Trunk Railway until 1883, when it was leased to the Canadian Pacific Railway. Conversion to standard gauge required realigning some of the track curves, particularly around Woodbridge (the mainline was shifted to the east through town, and a new Woodbridge Station built to replace the original TG&B station, that became a farmer's supply store). In 1908 this line was linked to the transcontinental route through Sudbury at Bolton, with the original TG&B route between Bolton and Orangeville being abandoned in 1934.

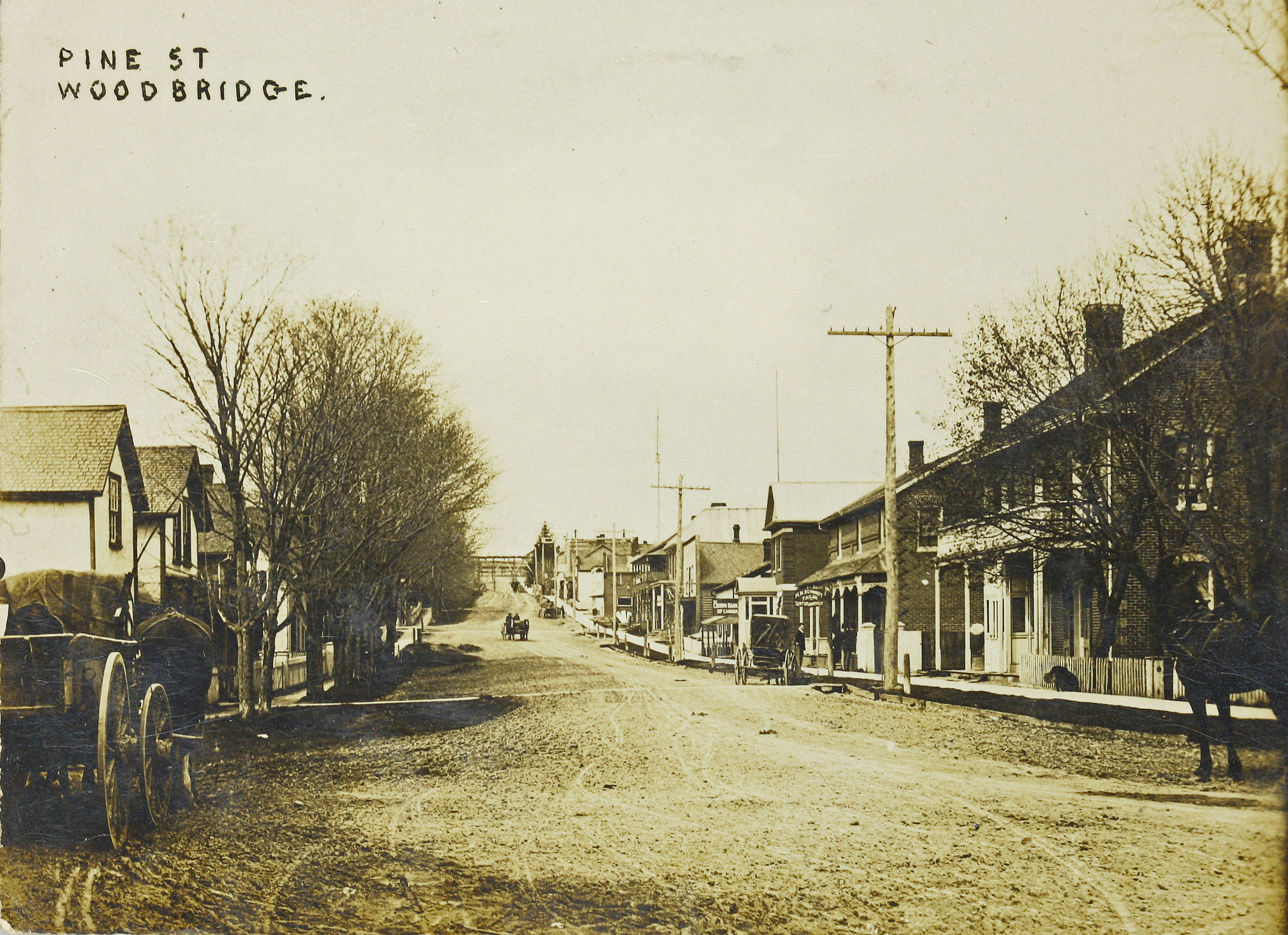
Looking west on Pine Street (present-day Woodbridge Avenue) in downtown Woodbridge, circa 1910

By 1880, the settlement had two general stores, a carriage works, two churches, a school, two hotels, a library, two newspapers and a post office. As the population increased it was pressured by the citizens to add a post office so there would be no confusion with another settlement in Canada West. By 1882, Woodbridge had over a thousand residents and was incorporated as a village. Some of the notable hotels for horse-drawn commercial travelers passing through town included the Queen's Hotel, Inkerman House, Dominion House, and Prentice Hotel.

Woodbridge was also served by a branch of the Toronto Suburban Railway from 1914 until 1926. The radial railway from Weston came in to downtown Woodbridge along the west side of the Humber River, north of Humber Summit, after descending from its route along Albion Road and Kipling Avenue. It handled passenger traffic until 1925, and freight traffic (express runs for farmers shipping milk into the city) for a time later but the line was abandoned in May 1926. It was closed due to increased competition from the private automobile, and replaced with a bus service that was eventually run by the Toronto Transit Commission until 1975, when Vaughan Transit took over.

Historically, the Toronto Carrying-Place Trail once passed through Woodbridge along the Humber River, and became two trails where the main branch and east branch of the river split north of town. It was used by indigenous First Nations (such as the Huron-Wendat that lived in the area) and early explorers for over-land travel from Toronto to Holland Landing (Lake Ontario to Lake Simcoe), and was the only portage path in the area in the 1700s until roads started opening up in the 19th century. There were a series of indigenous settlements once located along the Humber River around and north of Woodbridge. As European settlement and agricultural activity increased, many grist, flour and saw mills were established in the area along the Humber River. The Wallace Brothers established the Wallace Brothers Roller Mills on the site of John Brown's old mill in 1877, at the southwest corner of present-day Highway 7 and Islington. The buildings lasted into the early 1980s before being demolished for the current plaza.

Early muddy, difficult-to-navigate roads gave way to road improvements in the mid-19th century, including converting some muddy trails and paths into planked roads. The Vaughan Plank Road Company was formed in 1860, that built a planked road through Woodbridge from Thistletown through Woodbridge, Pine Grove and Kleinburg to the King township border. The road had tollbooths at various points, and travelers were made to pay a toll for the road upkeep, which often was not very good. There was local opposition from farmers in later years, and the municipality took over in 1896, eliminating the tolls. Gravel roads, and eventually paved roads, followed.

== Post-War History ==
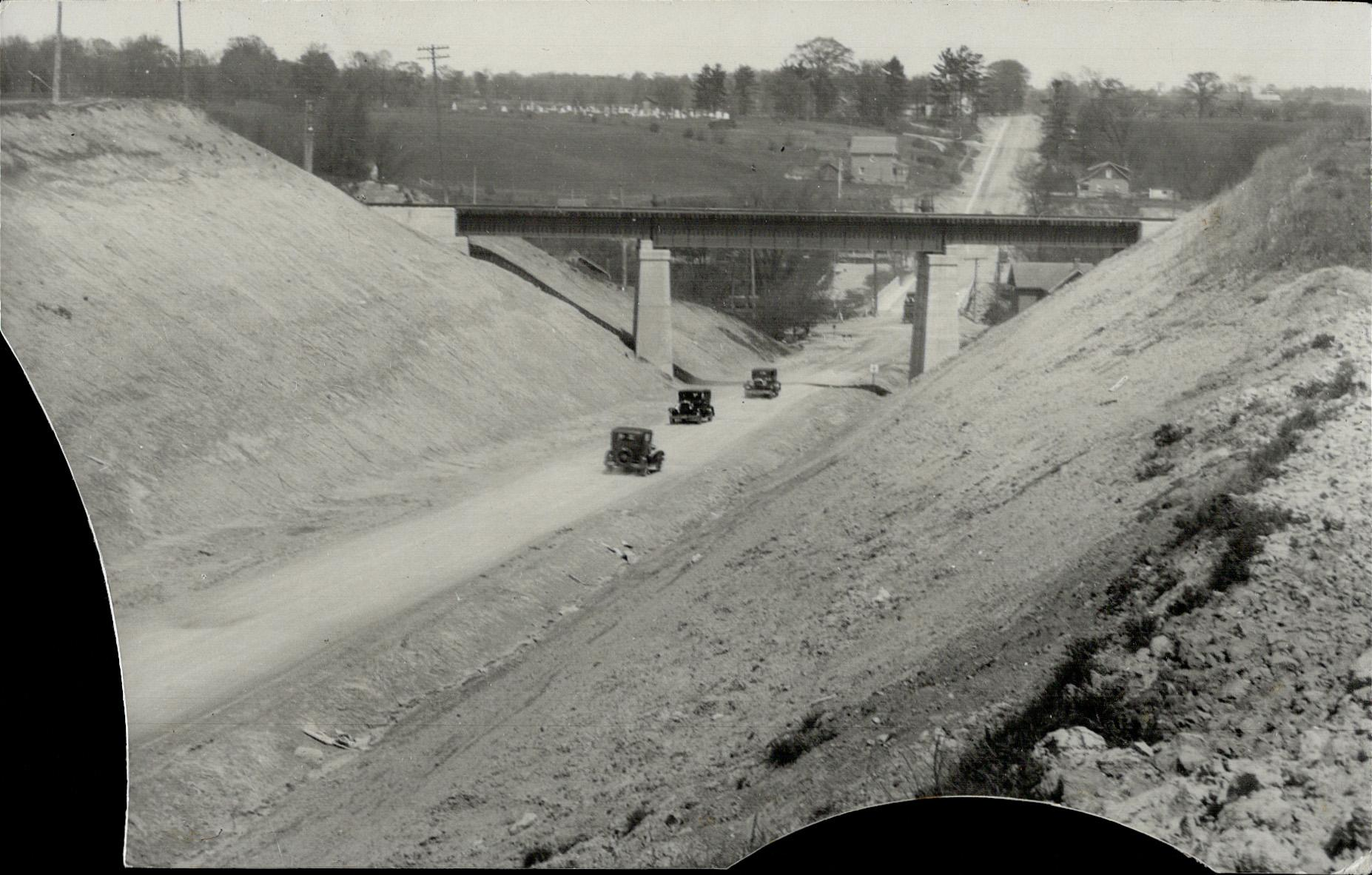
Highway 7 with new CPR bridge cut, in 1931

Construction of Highway 7 from Woodbridge to Thornhill took place between 1928 and 1932, passing south of the business section of town via the Canadian Pacific Railway underpass built in 1929-1930 (the original roadway followed a portion of McKenzie Street, and once crossed the tracks at-grade before looping south down the hill to Wallace St. and the Humber River bridge). Other important transportation corridors included construction of Highway 27 to the west in 1937–1938, and Highway 400 to the east completed in 1951.

Another important employer came to town when W. Robinson & Sons (later Robinson Cotton Mills Ltd) established a textile and cotton mill in the mid-1920's. The company expanded into moulded products and foams in the 1950s as Robinson Foams Ltd, and is now known as Woodbridge Foam.

The Elm Park Pavilion opened in 1927 at the northwest corner of present-day Highway 7 and Islington Avenue. A popular entertainment venue, it caught fire in 1950 and was replaced with the Woodbridge District Memorial Arena (today known as the Woodbridge Pool & Memorial Arena) in February 1951, built to commemorate the Second World War. It was built on land donated by the Robinson Cotton Mills. It has since been modernized and expanded over the years as a key community centre.

A Canadian Legion branch, the MacKenzie Branch 414, was formed in May 1946 and a new Legion building was built in 1948 on the former MacKenzie farm lands, along Mill Road (present-day Legion Court). It was named after Ross and Alex MacKenzie, who fought in the first world war. The branch was closed in February 2024 due to biker gang association.

As Woodbridge is on the Humber floodplain, Hurricane Hazel in 1954 devastated the community as the Humber River swelled from its usual width of 20 m (66 ft) at its narrowest point to 107 m (351 ft), and left hundreds homeless and nine dead. This included washing away mill damns in Woodbridge and Pine Grove, major flooding in the Clarence Street area downtown, ravaging a trailer park along Islington Avenue, and washing downstream some old streetcars used at a Polish Camp near Kleinburg.

Post-Hazel, a number of initiatives were undertaken by the Humber Valley Conservation Authority (today the Toronto Region Conservation Authority), including diversions and reroutings of the Humber River that included construction of a diversion channel north of town in 1962 (at the same time Islington Avenue was extended north of Highway 7). Land around parts of the Humber was acquired and flood plain zones were established to prevent development in low-lying areas around the river that were prone to flooding. At this time, the land around much of Woodbridge was agricultural. Slowly, rural homes were built in the surrounding areas.

== Suburban Growth and Development ==
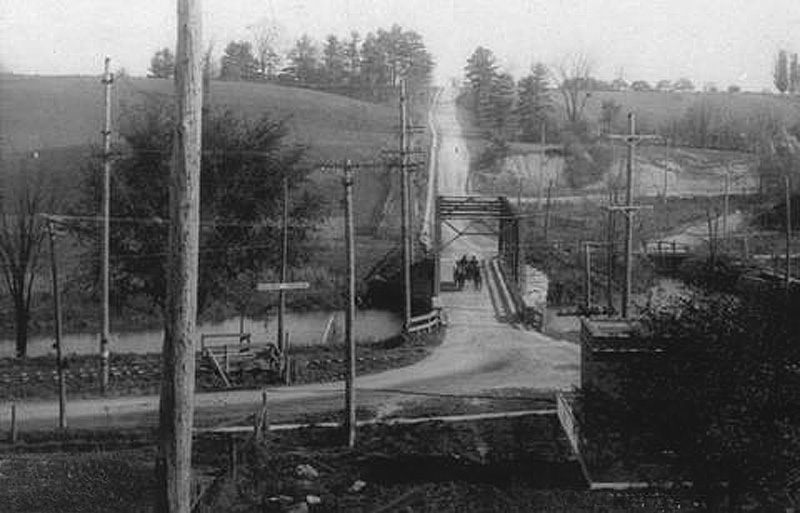
McKenzie Street looking east at the Humber River (present-day Highway 7 at Islington Ave.) pre-1931

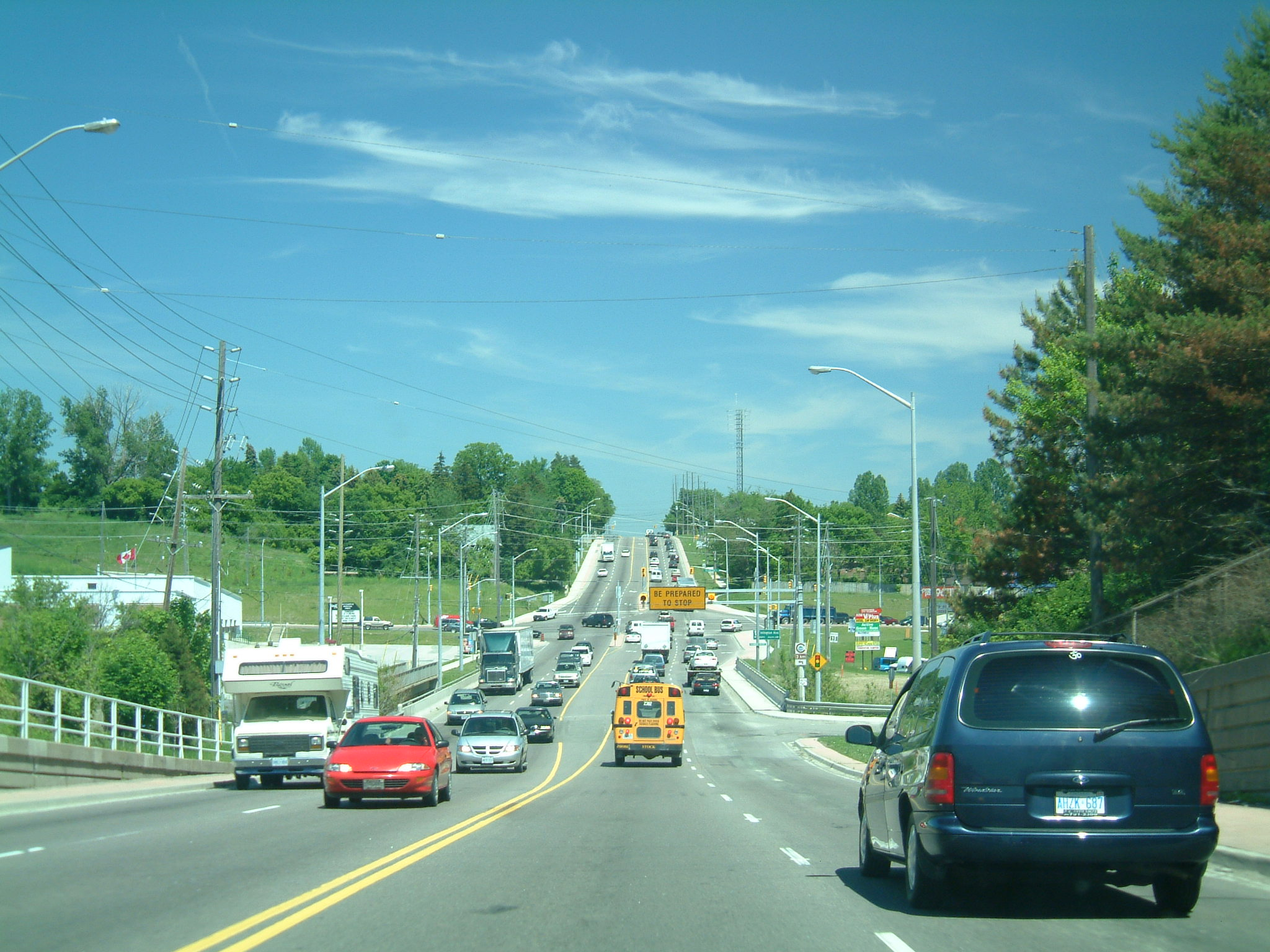
The same view today looking east along Highway 7 in the Humber River Valley near Islington Ave.

In the 1950s, Woodbridge experienced spillover growth from suburban Metropolitan Toronto, which ultimately led to its defined area expanding far beyond the village's then-incorporated boundaries. Later, many Italians that settled in Toronto neighbourhoods such as Little Italy, moved to the suburbs and exurbs, in particular Woodbridge. The suburban expansion began east of the Humber and East Humber and to the northeast. Prior to the expansion, the urban area was up to Kipling Avenue and to the Humber. It later expanded in the west up to present-day Martin Grove Road and north to northeast of Langstaff Road in the 1960s. It later expanded further north in the 1970s and 1980s. A drive-in theatre was situated on Langstaff Road east of Highway 27. Operating from 1967 to 1997, the site was developed for housing in 1998.

The Village of Woodbridge, along with other communities within Vaughan Township, was amalgamated to form the new Town (now City) of Vaughan in 1971.

The housing developments in the west expanded north to Langstaff. Development continued in the central part of Woodbridge (including the transformation of older stores in the village into smaller units of housing) in the early 1980s and west to Highway 27 in the late 1980s and early 90s. Development extended north to just south of Rutherford Road in the 1980s and east up to Weston Road from Highway 7 to south of Rutherford Road and south to north of the present-day Highway 407. The industrial areas began appearing first to the west and then to the southwest and east.

After the aforementioned drive-in was closed, Martin Grove Road was extended northward through the former property to serve more developments. Woodbridge Highlands was formed in the northwest, east of Highway 27 in the 1990s. In 1994 housing developments reached to Rutherford and continued until 1996 except for the northeast and the southeastern part. Condominiums were also constructed in the old village along Woodbridge Avenue. Sonoma Heights at Islington and Rutherford and Vellore (built around the former hamlet of Vellore, and today including Vellore Village and Vellore Woods) around Weston and Rutherford were developed. Development in the north end of Woodbridge then followed with Weston and Rutherford Roads becoming a major focal point for the building of additional residential units stretching north to Major Mackenzie Drive. Land on both sides of Weston Road to Major Mackenzie were completely filled in. Development continued north of Major Mackenzie (possibly outside Woodbridge's accepted boundary) in the 2010s north to the former hamlet of Purpleville (Pine Valley Drive and Teston Road) and is still ongoing in the 2020s.

Woodbridge contains many industrial developments, mostly along Steeles east of the Humber and running north along the west side of Highway 400 east of Weston. These were mostly built during the 1980s. Another major industrial area began development west of Highway 27 in the 2000s in anticipation of the construction of Highway 427, and is still ongoing, bolstered by the opening of the highway in 2021.

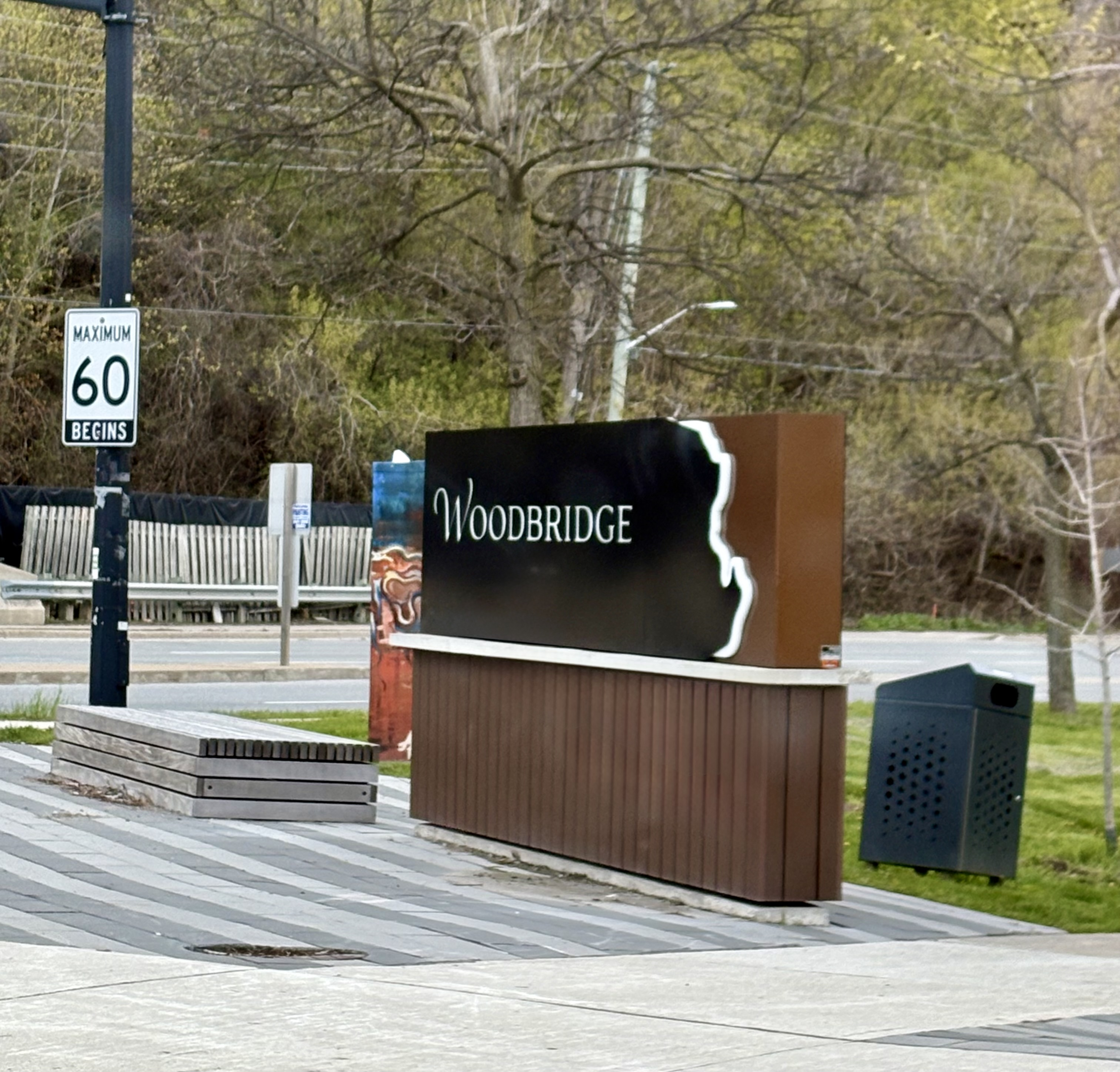
Woodbridge sign on the corner of Woodbridge Avenue and Islington Avenue

Woodbridge Avenue (formerly known as Pine Street) between Islington Avenue and Kipling Avenue is historically the downtown of Woodbridge, and was once home to some of the historical buildings from the late 19th century in addition to newer 1920s–1960s buildings, but is rapidly being redeveloped. Many older shops were demolished in the late 1970s and 1980s for the Fairground Lane and Market Lane shopping developments. Two examples of historic buildings include a Tinsmith Shop and Masonic Lodge (c. 1850) and the Burwick family home (from 1844 on Pine Street) that were moved to Black Creek Pioneer Village. Market Lane remains the commercial hub of this area, with several other shops and stores lining Woodbridge Avenue.

Woodbridge was chosen as the new location for a research based mental health facility, the OCD and Anxiety Clinic of Ontario. First of its kind, it offers specialized psychological care by offering case by case care, as opposed to a volume patient care model.

An F2 tornado tore through the city of Vaughan during the Southern Ontario Tornado Outbreak on 20 August 2009. The tornado also ripped up trees, flipped cars, and left thousands of people without power. No one was killed.

== Geography ==
Situated in hilly terrain of the Humber River Valley, historic Woodbridge rests at an average elevation of 200 metres between Highway 27 and Pine Valley Drive. The terrain can be described as a series of rolling hills and valleys. There are numerous valley intersections that demonstrate the geography of the area, notably Highway 7 and Islington and Highway 27 and Rutherford.

The area was mainly farmland before the onset of suburbanization in the 1970s, but the residential communities are interspersed with forests along the Humber River and its eastern branch. Today, much of the area is residential with commercial and industrial properties to the south, close to Steeles Avenue and to the east near Pine Valley Drive.

The area commonly considered to be Woodbridge today covers a very large portion (roughly one-third) of Vaughan, and is usually seen as being bounded by Highway 50 or Highway 27 to the west, Steeles Avenue to the south, Highway 400 to the east, and Major Mackenzie Drive to the north, However, its boundaries are somewhat unclear and have expanded over the years in sync with the urbanization of the southwestern area of Vaughan and this boundary appears to be expanding north of Major Mackenzie west of Highway 400 along the Weston Road corridor as urbanization continues.

=== Climate ===
Woodbridge has a humid continental climate (Köppen climate classification Dfb), with warm, humid summers and cold, snowy winters. Woodbridge winters feature cold snaps where maximum temperatures remain below −10 °C (14 °F), often made to feel colder by wind chill. Accumulating snow can fall any time from October until April. Summer in Woodbridge is characterized by long stretches of humid weather. Spring and autumn are transitional seasons, with generally mild or cool temperatures and alternating dry and wet periods. According to the USDA plant hardiness level, Woodbridge is 5a.

Climate data for Woodbridge (Vaughan) Climate ID: 6159575; coordinates 43°47′N 79°36′W; elevation: 164 m (538 ft); 1981–2010 normals, 1948–2005
Month	Jan	Feb	Mar	Apr	May	Jun	Jul	Aug	Sep	Oct	Nov	Dec	Year
Record high °C (°F)	17.0 (62.6)	15.5 (59.9)	26.5 (79.7)	31.5 (88.7)	33.0 (91.4)	36.0 (96.8)	39.0 (102.2)	37.2 (99.0)	36.1 (97.0)	30.6 (87.1)	25.0 (77.0)	19.5 (67.1)	39.0 (102.2)
Mean daily maximum °C (°F)	−2.5 (27.5)	−0.5 (31.1)	4.3 (39.7)	12.0 (53.6)	18.8 (65.8)	24.1 (75.4)	26.9 (80.4)	25.4 (77.7)	20.9 (69.6)	13.9 (57.0)	6.9 (44.4)	0.8 (33.4)	12.6 (54.7)
Daily mean °C (°F)	−6.6 (20.1)	−4.8 (23.4)	−0.4 (31.3)	6.6 (43.9)	12.9 (55.2)	18.1 (64.6)	20.8 (69.4)	19.6 (67.3)	15.4 (59.7)	9.0 (48.2)	3.1 (37.6)	−2.8 (27.0)	7.6 (45.7)
Mean daily minimum °C (°F)	−10.7 (12.7)	−9.2 (15.4)	−5.2 (22.6)	1.2 (34.2)	6.8 (44.2)	12.0 (53.6)	14.7 (58.5)	13.8 (56.8)	9.8 (49.6)	4.0 (39.2)	−0.8 (30.6)	−6.4 (20.5)	2.5 (36.5)
Record low °C (°F)	−34.5 (−30.1)	−30.0 (−22.0)	−29.4 (−20.9)	−17.2 (1.0)	−6.7 (19.9)	−1.7 (28.9)	2.8 (37.0)	−0.6 (30.9)	−5.0 (23.0)	−11.7 (10.9)	−18.3 (−0.9)	−30.0 (−22.0)	−34.5 (−30.1)
Average precipitation mm (inches)	50.3 (1.98)	44.2 (1.74)	49.2 (1.94)	63.3 (2.49)	79.1 (3.11)	76.3 (3.00)	70.4 (2.77)	80.4 (3.17)	84.6 (3.33)	66.5 (2.62)	78.3 (3.08)	57.4 (2.26)	799.8 (31.49)
Average rainfall mm (inches)	20.4 (0.80)	23.2 (0.91)	31.4 (1.24)	59.6 (2.35)	79.1 (3.11)	76.3 (3.00)	70.4 (2.77)	80.4 (3.17)	84.6 (3.33)	66.0 (2.60)	71.1 (2.80)	34.6 (1.36)	697.0 (27.44)
Average snowfall cm (inches)	29.9 (11.8)	21.1 (8.3)	17.8 (7.0)	3.7 (1.5)	0.0 (0.0)	0.0 (0.0)	0.0 (0.0)	0.0 (0.0)	0.0 (0.0)	0.45 (0.18)	7.2 (2.8)	22.8 (9.0)	102.8 (40.5)
Average precipitation days (≥ 0.2 mm)	13.5	10.3	10.7	11.8	12.0	10.8	9.5	9.6	10.6	12.7	13.1	12.8	137.4
Average rainy days (≥ 0.2 mm)	4.2	4.4	6.4	10.7	12.0	10.8	9.5	9.6	10.6	12.6	11.1	6.5	108.3
Average snowy days (≥ 0.2 cm)	10.2	6.8	5.1	1.5	0.0	0.0	0.0	0.0	0.0	0.23	3.0	7.5	34.3
Source: Environment and Climate Change Canada

=== Surrounding communities ===
- Kleinburg, N
- Maple, NE
- Concord, E
- Etobicoke, S (Toronto)
- Claireville, W (Brampton)
- Rexdale, S (Toronto)

== Demographics ==
As of the 2021 census, the population of Woodbridge is 106,810, a 1.5% increase from the 105,228 population in 2016. As of the 2021 census, the top three ethnic groups in Woodbridge are Italian (49,660; 46.7%; which, until the most recent census, was the highest concentration in Canada, now second to Nobleton), East Indian (5,815; 5.5%), Canadian (5,655; 5.3%).

== Attractions ==
Annual Woodbridge Fair demolition derby

=== Greenspace ===
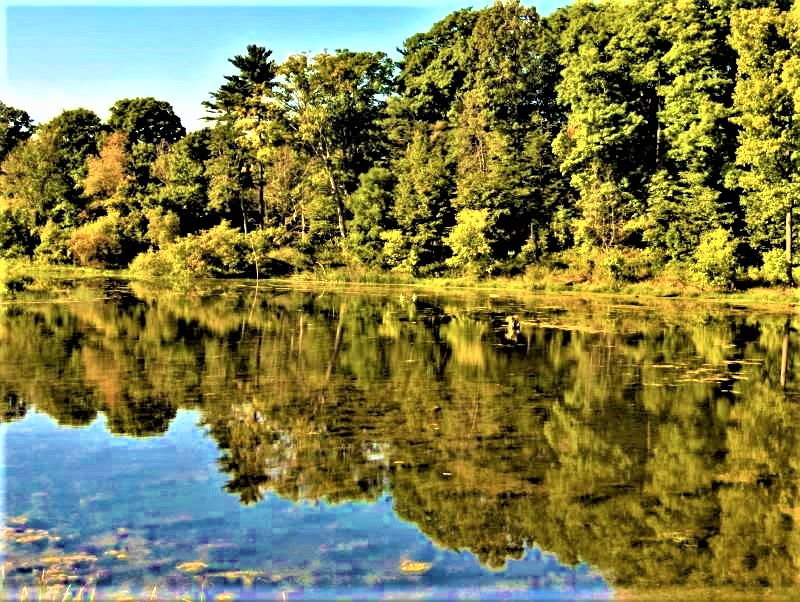
Kortright Centre for Conservation

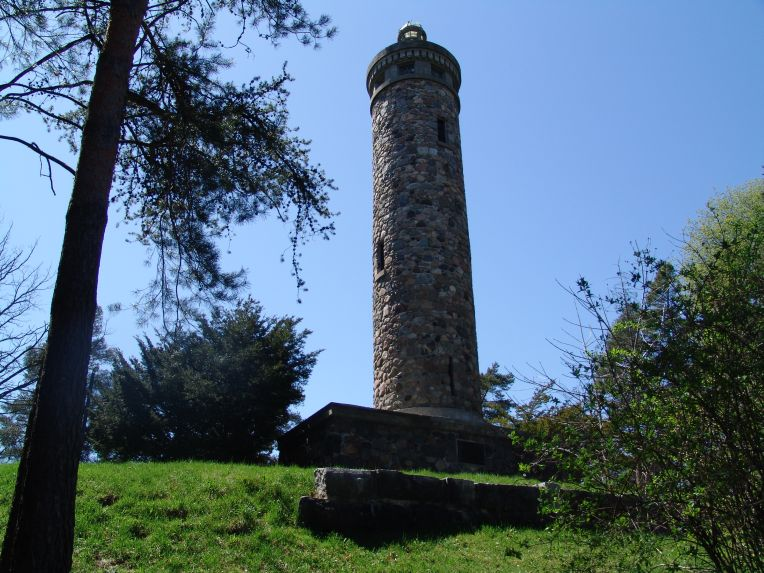
Woodbridge Memorial Tower built in memory of the men of Woodbridge who served and were killed in World War I

Woodbridge is home to two natural preserves along the Humber River:

- Boyd Conservation Area
- Kortright Centre for Conservation
- Doctors McLean District Park
- Rainbow Creek Park
- Woodbridge Fairgrounds where the fall fair has occurred since 1847
- Fundale Park
- Maxey Park

=== Sites of interest ===
- Market Lane
- Memorial Hill with a tower
- Pierre Berton Library
- Boyd Conservation Area
- Kortright Centre
- Vaughan Mills Outlets Shopping Centre

== Education ==
- Blue Willow Public School
- Emily Carr Secondary School
- Father Bressani Catholic High School
- Fossil Hill Public School
- Elders Mills Public School
- Holy Cross Catholic Academy
- Immaculate Conception Catholic Elementary School
- Johnny Lombardi Public School
- Lorna Jackson Public School
- North Hill Private School
- Our Lady of Fatima Catholic Elementary School
- Pine Grove Public School
- Pierre Berton Public Elementary School
- San Marco Catholic Elementary School
- St. Agnes of Assisi Elementary School
- St. Andrew Catholic Elementary School
- St. Angela Merici Catholic Elementary School
- St. Catherine of Siena Catholic Elementary School
- St. Clare Catholic Elementary School
- St. Clement Catholic Elementary School
- St. Francis of Assisi Catholic Elementary School
- St. Gabriel the Archangel Catholic Elementary School
- St. Gregory the Great Academy
- St. Jean de Brebeuf Catholic High School
- St. Emily Catholic Elementary School
- St. John Bosco Catholic Elementary School
- St. Margaret Mary Catholic Elementary School
- St. Padre Pio Catholic Elementary School
- St. Peter Catholic Elementary School
- St. Stephen Catholic Elementary School
- Tommy Douglas Secondary School
- Toronto District Christian High School
- Vellore Woods Public School
- Woodbridge College
- Woodbridge Montessori School (Private Elementary)
- Woodbridge Public School
- Glenn Gould Public School
- St.Michael the Archangel Catholic Elementary

== Notable people ==
- Anthony Aromatario, soccer player
- Elizabeth Arden, founder of cosmetic company of the same name
- Robert Barbieri, professional rugby player
- Mark Bocek, UFC fighter
- Jesse Carere, actor
- Anthony Cirelli, hockey player
- Andrew Cogliano, NHL player
- Frank Corrado, NHL player
- Mark Cundari, NHL player
- Chris DiDomenico, NHL player
- Natalie Di Luccio, international multilingual singer
- Sergio Di Zio, actor
- Steve Eminger, NHL player
- Danny Fernandes, singer
- Mike Harris, 22nd premier of Ontario
- Jimmy Jones, NHL player
- Stephen Lecce, Ontario minister of education
- Mike Liambas, NHL player
- Marc Liegghio, Canadian Football League player
- Victor Mete, NHL player
- Steve Nease, cartoonist
- Michael Petrasso, football (soccer) player
- Dina Pugliese, television personality
- Marco Reda, professional football (soccer) player
- David Rocco, actor and television cooking show host
- Vince Rocco, ice hockey player
- Arthur Evans Snell, 10th Canadian Surgeon General
- Sarah Stratigakis, professional football (soccer) player
- Marco Terminesi, football (soccer) player

== In popular culture ==
The song "The Woodbridge Dog Disaster" by Canadian folk singer Stan Rogers, detailing a fictional occurrence in the community, was recorded in the 1970s.
