= The Toronto Turkish Festival =

The Toronto Turkish Festival, organized by the Canadian Turkish Friendship Community (CTFC), celebrates Turkish culture through music, exhibitions, arts, crafts, dance, shows and food. Held annually since August 2006, the festival takes place on the first weekend of August at Sankofa Square (formerly Yonge-Dundas Square) in downtown Toronto. It receives support and encouragement from the City of Toronto, local councilors, the mayor, local police chiefs, the Canadian business community, and Sankofa Square management.

The festival is sponsored by Turkish and international companies, including North America Energy Star (NAES) and Turkish Airlines (THY), as well as Turkish municipalities such as Fatih Municipality, Istanbul and the Çorum Municipality. The inaugural event on August 5, 2006, attracted over 40,000 participants. David Miller, the Mayor of Toronto at the time, visited the festival.

Under Miller's encouragement, CTFC expanded the event to a two-day festival. The festival was successfully held on August 4-5, 2007; August 2-3, 2008; and August 1-2, 2009, establishing it as an annual tradition. Nearly one hundred thousand attendees from Canadian-Turkish communities, as well as from other communities and cultures across the Greater Toronto Area, neighboring cities, provinces, and U.S. states, have visited the festival.

The festival is open to the public, with free admission. Proceeds from the festival are donated to Nil Academy, a Turkish school in Toronto established by the Canadian Turkish Friendship Community in 2005.

CTFC, established in 2005, is a non-profit charitable organization dedicated to promoting Turkish culture and language in Toronto and throughout Canada. One of its primary objectives is to enhance Ontario communities by fostering intercultural events and supporting educational and cultural activities that are accessible to the public.

The festival showcases demonstrations of traditional Turkish crafts such as paper water marbling (Ebru), and carpet weaving. Live Turkish musical performances and folk dancing, including Sufi music and dancing, are also featured. Attendees can participate in a unique tasting experience, enjoying specialty Turkish tea or coffee in a re-created traditional family room (Sark Kosesi-“Eastern Türkiye Corner”), surrounded by Turkish carpets and cushions. Visitors also have the opportunity to take photographs in traditional Ottoman costumes. Other highlights include displays of handcrafted linens, clothing, and carpets, decorative accessories, hand-painted ceramic plates and tiles, copper crafts, pottery, silk scarves, pillowcases, books on Turkish life, culture, cooking and travel, as well as CDs featuring traditional and popular Turkish rock and jazz music.

For the first time in Toronto, the Ottoman Military Band, supported by the Municipality of Fatih, Istanbul, performed with 22 team members. They entertained visitors with four concerts held on August 1-2, 2009, and participated in four parades alongside the Turkish community during the festival. This marked the inaugural Turkish parade in Toronto at Yonge and Dundas. The band, known for its historical role accompanying the Ottoman army into battles, features traditional instruments like the zurna (an oboe-like woodwind instrument), which remains integral to folk culture throughout Turkey.
