= Canadians in Turkey =

Total population
- 1,128

Regions with significant populations
- Istanbul · Ankara

Languages
- English · Turkish

Religion
- Roman Catholicism · Protestantism

There are over 1,100 Canadians living in Turkey, the majority of which are based in Ankara and Istanbul according to the Registration of Canadians Abroad (ROCA) and the local Canadian embassy and consulates in the country. In recent years, the number of Canadians settling within Turkey has seen a sharp rise with the country continuing to be one of the fastest-rising destinations for Canadians heading overseas. The growing figures have been linked as a proponent for the skyrocketing ratio of Canadian tourists choosing to visit Turkey each year. In 2009, approximately 150,000 Canadians had been to Turkey, an increase from the 39,000 in 1995.

There are a number of community organisations and set-ups, such as the Professional American Women of Istanbul (PAWI), a network of American and Canadian women living in Istanbul and The Professional and Fabulous (PAF) group, which is a breakaway from the former and also mostly made up of expatriate women of U.S. and Canadian origin living in Turkey.

== Notable people ==
Notable Canadians who have lived in Turkey include:

- Michael Meeks
- William Njoku
- Tammy Sutton-Brown
- Jay Triano

== See also ==
- Canada–Turkey relations
- Turkish Canadian
