= Canada–Turkey relations =

- Canada: Turkey

Diplomatic mission
- Embassy of Canada, Ankara: Embassy of Turkey, Ottawa

Envoy
- Canadian Ambassador to Turkey Kevin Hamilton: Turkish Ambassador to Canada Can Dizdar

Canada and Turkey have maintained diplomatic relations since 1943. Both countries are members of the G20, NATO, Organization for Economic Co-operation and Development, Organization for Security and Co-operation in Europe, United Nations and the World Trade Organization.

== History ==
The first Turkish migrants arrived to Canada in the late 19th century from what was then the Ottoman Empire. In 1922, soon after obtaining its independence, Canada issued its first foreign policy mandate to the United Kingdom that it would not partake in war with Turkey during the Chanak Crisis. First official contact between both nations took place in 1943 when the Turkish government informed Ottawa of its intent to open a resident embassy, which was opened in 1944. Canada followed suit in 1947 by opening an embassy in Ankara.

During the Cold War, relations between both nations evolved mainly around military and security cooperation within the framework of NATO. In March 1985, three members of the Armenian Revolutionary Army attacked the Turkish embassy in Ottawa and held the Ambassador and several other people within the embassy hostage. The attackers wanted Turkey to acknowledge the Armenian genocide. After four hours, the hostages were released unharmed and the armed men were taken into police custody. This was the third assault on Turkish diplomatic staff in Ottawa by Armenian attackers in three years.

In 2004, the Canadian Parliament formally recognized the Armenian Genocide. Canada's recognition has had an adverse effect on the bilateral relations between the two countries.

There have been numerous high-level visits between leaders of both nations. In June 2010, Turkish President Recep Tayyip Erdoğan paid a visit to Canada to attend the G20 Summit in Toronto. In November 2015, Canadian Prime Minister Justin Trudeau paid a visit to Turkey to attend the G20 Summit in Antalya.

In June 2019, Canada and Turkey signed a Memorandum of Understanding establishing a Joint Economic and Trade Committee, with a view to holding annual meetings between Canadian and Turkish officials and businesses to expand bilateral trade and investment opportunities.

On 9 October 2019, Canadian Minister of Foreign Affairs Chrystia Freeland stated that Canada "firmly condemns" Turkey's military offensive into north-eastern Syria.

During the 2020 Nagorno-Karabakh conflict, Canada has taken a neutral stance, while Turkey openly supported Azerbaijan. However, after Canadian military technology was found to be used by the Azerbaijani military attacking civilians, Canada suspended export to Azerbaijan, prompting criticism against Canada by Turkey. Relations between Turkey and Canada have started to be strained since 2019 after Turkish intervention in Syria. Turkey accused Canada of "double standard" in freezing military exports to Turkey but not Saudi Arabia, which is involved in military intervention in Yemen.

In December 2023, Turkey eliminated visa requirements for Canadian tourists, a strategic move aimed at boosting tourism from Canada. This change marked a significant shift in Canada-Turkey relations, facilitating easier travel for Canadians and potentially increasing the number of visitors to Turkey.

Canada and Turkey began negotiations for a free trade agreement in October 2026, during a visit to Ankara by Canadian Prime Minister Mark Carney.

== Trade ==
In 2019, trade between both nations totaled US$2.4 billion. Over 350 Canadian companies have investments in Turkey, mostly in the fields of energy, mining, information technology and infrastructure.

== Arms ==
In 2019, Canada decided to block arms exports because Turkey used Canadian arms in the Turkish operations in Syria, but later the restrictions eased. Canada reimposed the restrictions in 2021 after it was found that Canadian technology and arms which were exported to Turkey used in the 2020 Nagorno-Karabakh war and Turkey violated the Canadian foreign policy and the end-use assurances given to Canada by it. The Embassy of Turkey to Canada complained that the move would "negatively affect our bilateral relations and undermine alliance solidarity." In early 2024, Canada started to export arms to Turkey again.

== Resident diplomatic missions ==
of Canada in Turkey

- Ankara (Embassy)
- Istanbul (Consulate-General)

of Turkey in Canada

- Ottawa (Embassy)
- Montreal (Consulate-General)
- Toronto (Consulate-General)
- Vancouver (Consulate-General)

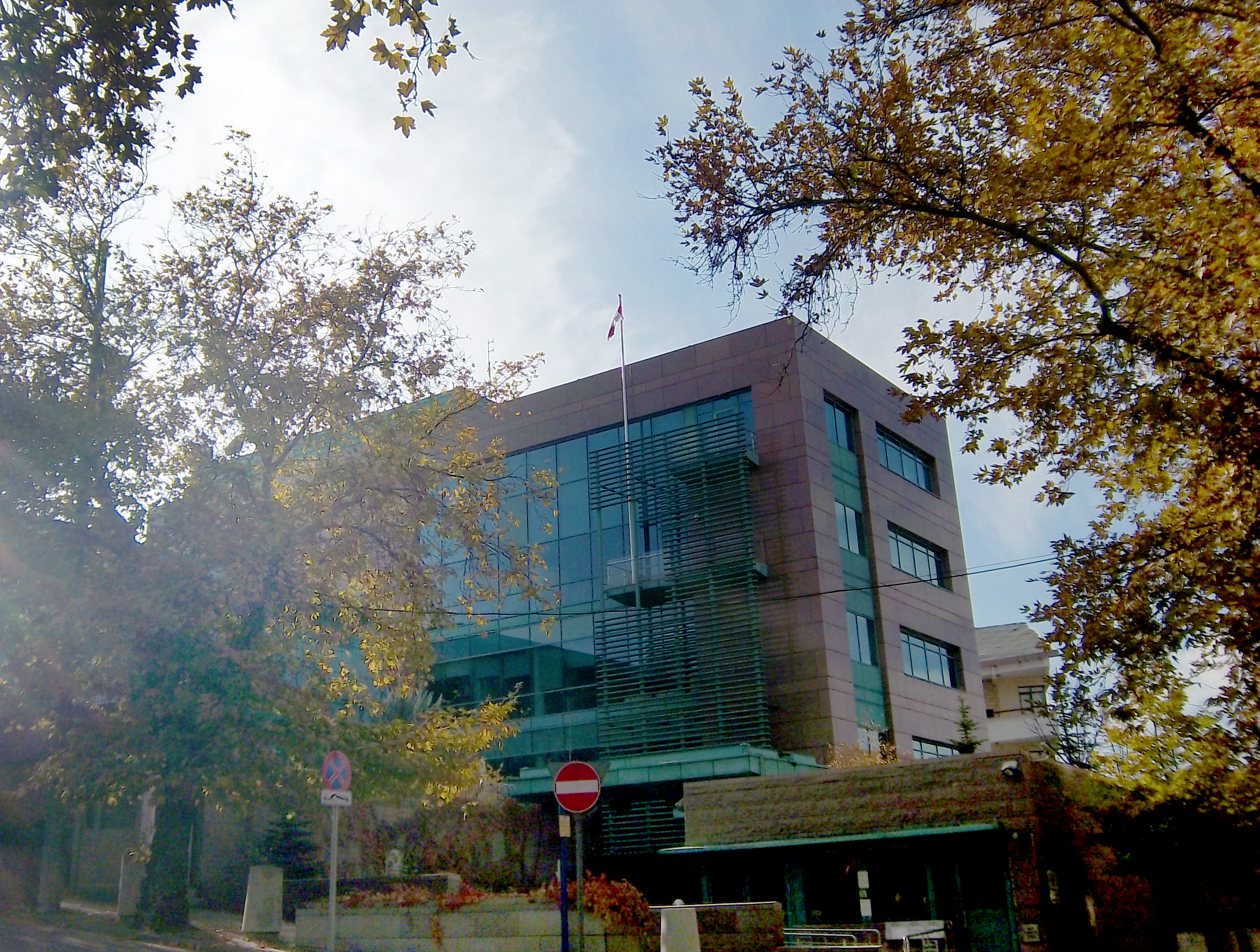
Embassy of Canada in Ankara

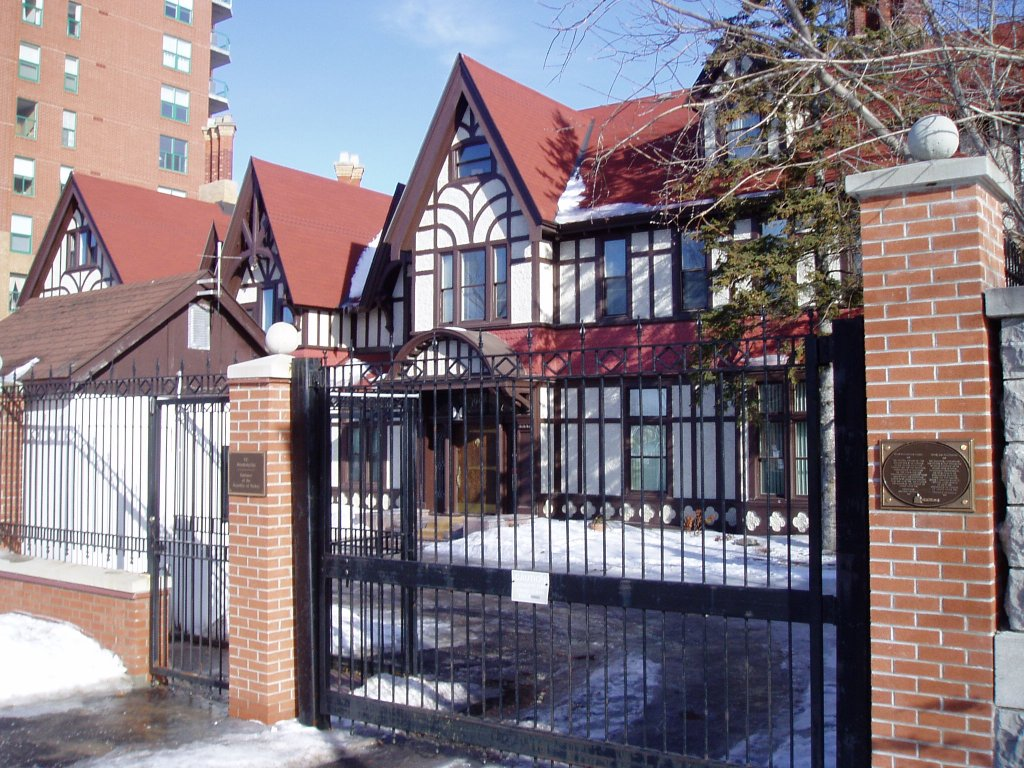
Embassy of Turkey in Ottawa

== See also ==
- Turkish Canadians
- Canadians in Turkey
- Embassy of Turkey, Ottawa
- Foreign relations of Canada
- Foreign relations of Turkey
