= Toronto District Christian High School =

Coordinates: 43°46′58.5″N 79°36′01″W

Location
- 377 Woodbridge Ave. Vaughan, Ontario; Canada

Information
- Type: Independent
- Motto: Learning for service in the light of God’s Word
- Established: 1960
- Principal: Joel Dykxhoorn
- Grades: 9–12
- Enrollment: 490
- Colours: Green, black, white
- Nickname: TDCH, TDChristian
- Affiliations: Edvance Christian Schools, Christian Schools International
- Website: www.tdchristian.ca

Toronto District Christian High School (TDChristian) is an independent Christian secondary school located in the city of Vaughan, Ontario, Canada, in the city's Woodbridge neighbourhood. It was founded in 1960 and began classes in 1963. TDCH currently has an enrollment of about 450 students. TDCH is a member of the Ontario Alliance of Christian Schools.

== History ==
In the 1950s, after a relatively large wave of Dutch immigration to Ontario, several Christian elementary schools were founded in the Greater Toronto Area. Eventually, many of the members of this community began to look ahead to Christian secondary schooling.

In 1960, the Toronto District Association for Christian Secondary Education was founded, and planning for a Christian high school began. In 1963 forty-nine grade nine and ten students began classes in Second Christian Reformed Church of Toronto. Eventually, a fundraising campaign raised $30,000, which was used to help buy a 15-acre (61,000 m^{2}) site in the-then independent Town of Woodbridge; a second campaign in 1964 generated $115,000 of the $150,000 needed for a building on the site. In 1965, the school building opened, with eight classrooms and a gym, and enrolment had risen to 130 students.

The school grew rapidly, beginning with expansions in 1970, 1974, and 1986, adding a library, staff room, auditorium, art room, and additional offices and classrooms. By 1991, the school was filled to its capacity of about 400 students.

In 1994, Ren Siebenga became principal, and the community came together to begin what would be called "Project 2000", with a mission to expand and renew the school's facilities. From 1999 through 2003, the pre-1980s section of the building was renovated, and improvements were made to the school, including the addition of a performance centre, hallway computers, additional classrooms, a fitness centre, and additional parking lot space. Enrollment rose to roughly 450 students.

== Athletics ==
TDCH's sports teams are called the Falcons, and the school colours are green, black, and white. The school is known best for its results in volleyball, but also has basketball, badminton, hockey, soccer, ultimate Frisbee, and cross country teams. TDChristian competes in the York Region Athletic Association (YRAA) and the Ontario Christian Secondary Schools Athletic Association (OCSSAA).

== Notable alumni ==
- Jim Veltman, the former captain (1999–2008) of the Toronto Rock lacrosse team in the National Lacrosse League.
