= Steve Nease =

Canadian cartoonist

- Steve Nease
- Born: Woodbridge, Ontario
- Occupation: Editorial cartoonist

Steve Nease is a Canadian editorial and comic strip cartoonist based in Oakville, Ontario, Canada. He was born and raised in Woodbridge, Ontario.

== Career ==
His career has spanned over 30 years, many of which were spent as Art Director of the Oakville Beaver. Since 2008 he has worked independently. He is most noted for his award-winning political and editorial cartoons, and his family comic strip, "Pud", based on the lives of the artist and his family.

He has also found success as a freelance illustrator, most notably Real Stories from the Rink by Brian MacFarlane.

In July 2016 Nease reestablished his long-time relationship with the Oakville Beaver and other Halton community newspapers, which have resumed publishing his editorial cartoons and comic strips after a hiatus of 8 years.

In 2022, Hiawatha First Nation Chief Laurie Carr criticized a Nease cartoon depicting Indigenous leaders demanding a payout from Pope Francis after his apology for Canadian Indian residential schools. Nease and Metroland Media managing editor Adam Martin-Robbins subsequently issued apologies.

== Awards and recognition ==
Nease received recognition for the best editorial cartoon of 2006 from the Suburban Newspaper Association (SNA) of North America in 2006 for his cartoon "Don't Forget the Sunblock".

Another important recognition Nease has received on eight occasions is Ontario Community Newspaper Association Cartoonist of the year, most recently for 2011.

Nease has also been recognized as the Canadian Community Newspapers Association Cartoonist of the year 10 times, most recently in 2009.
