= Adnan Dizdar =

Yugoslav handball player (born 1949)

Personal information
- Nationality: Yugoslav
- Born: 4 March 1949 (age 76)

Sport
- Sport: Handball

Adnan Dizdar (born 4 March 1949) is a Yugoslav handball player. He competed in the men's tournament at the 1980 Summer Olympics.
