= Mak Dizdar =

Bosnian poet (1917 – 1971)

- Born: Mehmedalija Dizdar; 17 October 1917; Stolac, Condominium of Bosnia and Herzegovina, Austria-Hungary
- Died: 14 July 1971 (aged 53); Sarajevo, SR Bosnia and Herzegovina, SFR Yugoslavia
- Occupation: Poet

Mehmedalija "Mak" Dizdar (17 October 1917 – 14 July 1971) was a Bosnian poet. His poetry combined influences from the Bosnian Christian culture, Islamic mysticism and cultural remains of medieval Bosnia, and especially the stećci.

His works Kameni spavač (Stone Sleeper) and Modra rijeka (Blue River) are regarded as the most important Bosnian poetic achievements of the 20th century.

== Biography ==
=== Early life ===
Mehmedalija Dizdar was born during World War I, to a Muslim family in Stolac, Bosnia and Herzegovina. He was the son of Muharem (died 1923) and Nezira (née Babović; 1881–1945). Mehmedalija was the second of three children. His older brother Hamid was a writer. Mehmedalija's sister Refika (1921–1945) and mother were killed in the Jasenovac concentration camp.

=== Career ===
In 1936, Dizdar relocated to Sarajevo where he attended and graduated from the State Sharia Gymnasium (Državna šerijatska gimnazija). He started working for the magazine Gajret, which his brother Hamid regulated and which was founded by Safvet beg Bašagić.

Dizdar spent his World War II years as a supporter of the Communist Partisans. He moved frequently from place to place in order to avoid the Independent State of Croatia authorities' attention.

After the war, Dizdar was a prominent figure in the cultural life of Bosnia and Herzegovina, working as the editor-in-chief of the daily Oslobođenje (Liberation). He served as head of a few state-sponsored publishing houses and eventually became a professional writer and the President of the Writers' Union of Bosnia and Herzegovina, a post he held until his death.

=== Personal life ===
Dizdar's son Enver (8 June 1944 – 21 December 2012) was a journalist and publicist.

Mak Dizdar died aged 53 in 1971, having outlived his parents and both siblings.

== Work ==
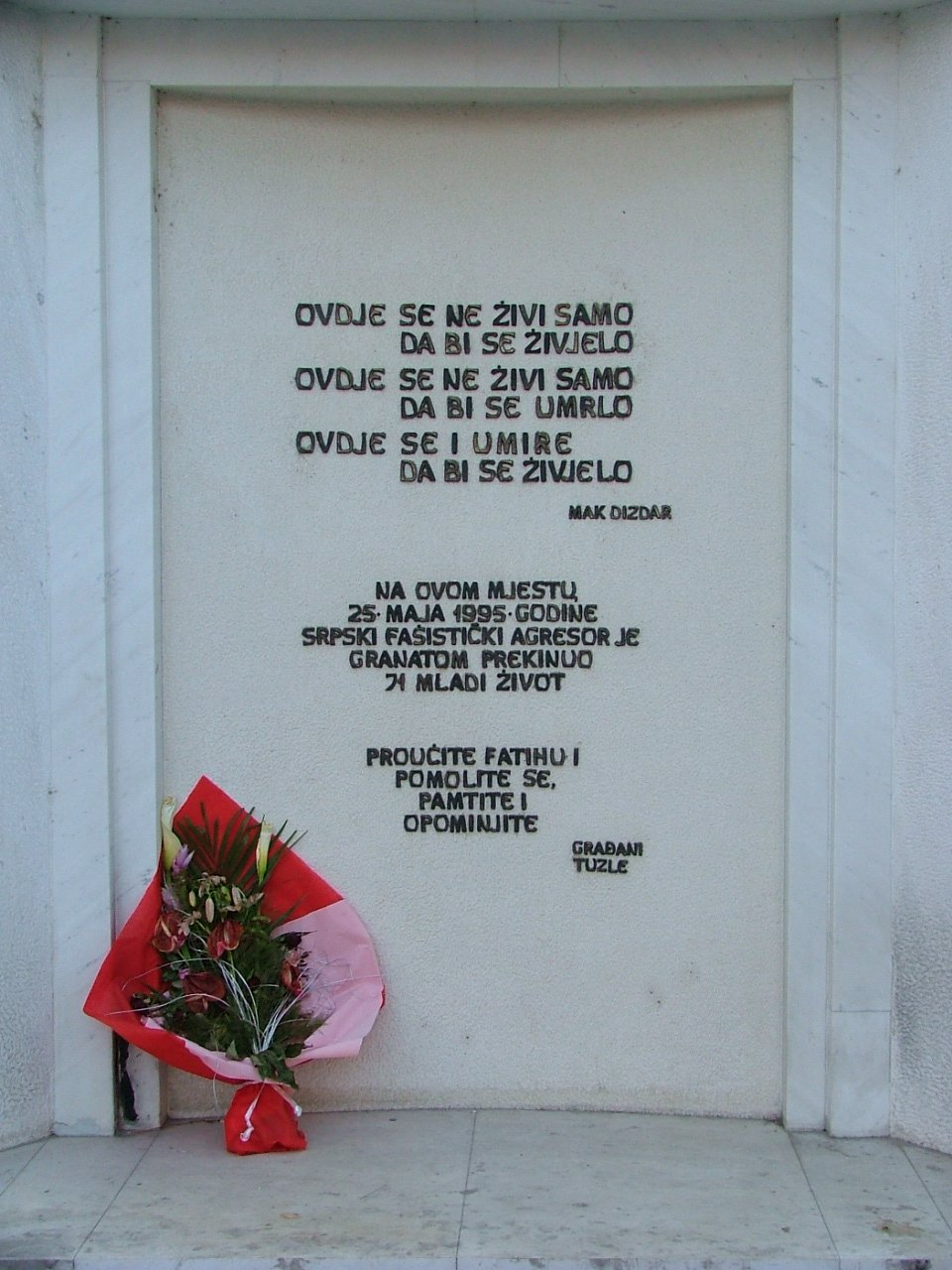
A poem by Mak Dizdar on the memorial of the Tuzla massacre: "Here one does not live just to live. Here one does not live just to die. Here one also dies to live"

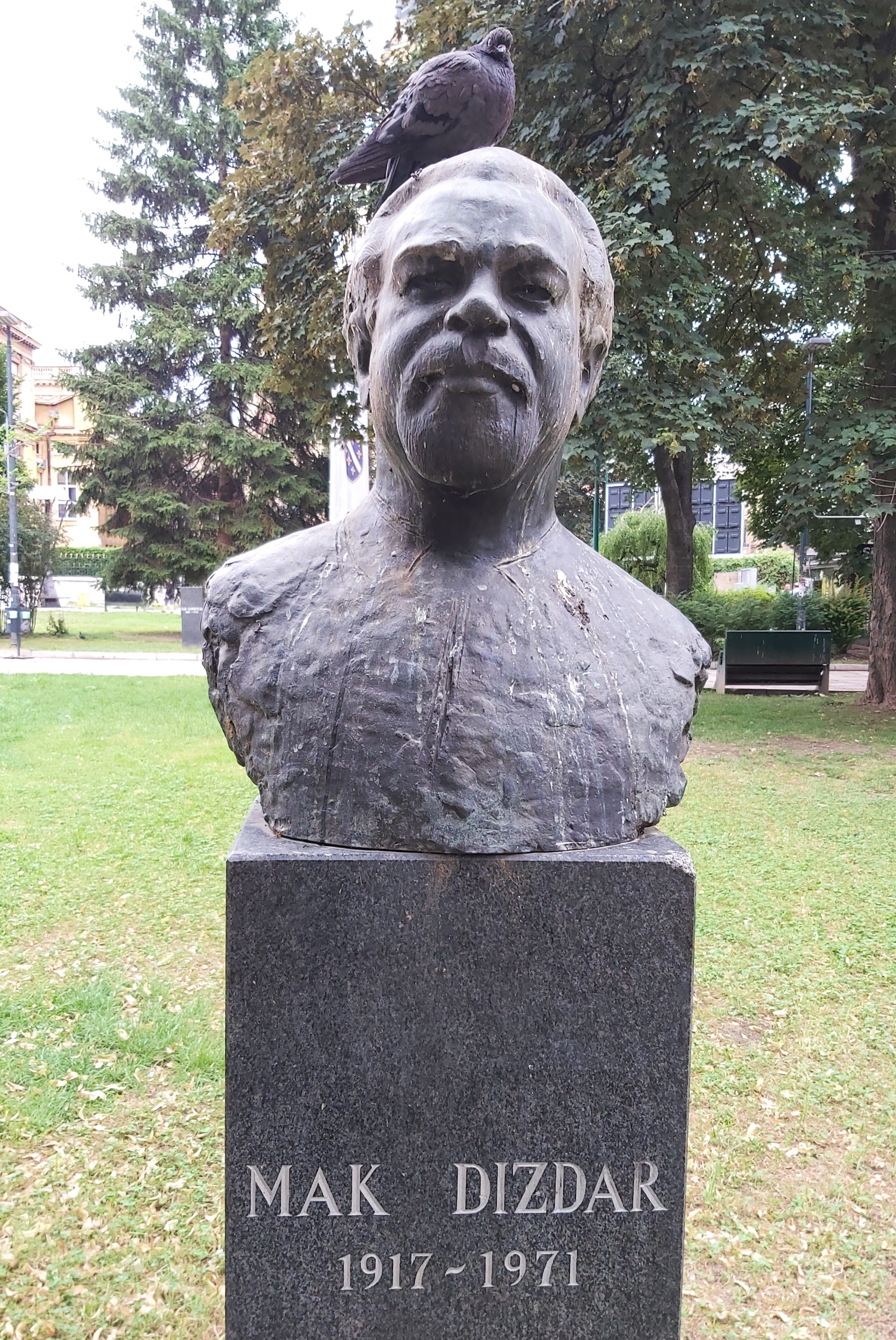
Bust in Sarajevo

Dizdar's two poetry collections and series of longer poems, Kameni spavač (Stone Sleeper) (1966–71) and Modra rijeka (Blue River, 1971), fused seemingly disparate elements. He drew inspiration from pre-Ottoman Bosnian Christian culture, from the sayings of heterodox Islamic visionary mystics, and from the 15th century Bosnian vernacular linguistic idiom. His poetry referenced medieval Bosnian tombstones ("stećci" or "mramorovi" - marbles) and their gnomic inscriptions on the ephemerality of life. It articulated a distinctive vision of life and death, drawing on Christian and Muslim Gnostic sensibilities of life as a passage between "tomb and stars", expressing both the Gnostic horror of corporeality and a sense of the blessedness of the universe.

== Dizdar and Stećci ==
In Bosnia and Herzegovina, there are about 60,000 stećci and a total of 70,000 in the greater region. The stećci are inscribed with various symbols and illustrations. Many of the symbols on the stećci bore significant religious symbolism in Dizdar’s works. The most common religious motifs visible on the stećci were a crescent moon, stars and circles (representing the sun). The second most common motif were the cross, which never appears alone. It regularly is seen in unison with a crescent moon and a star, and also sometimes with other symbols like a shield, sword, spear or flags. Other symbols used on stećci were men with large right hands, spirals, images of a kolo and deer. In addition to carved symbols on the stećci, short inscriptions or epigraphs were also carved into many stećci. The inscriptions on the stećci characterized the whole life of the deceased - their habits, the manner of their death, the love of their country in which they lie, and their awe at death.

Dizdar used the symbols and the inscriptions on the stećci as the backbone for his most famous work, Kameni spavač. Dizdar’s Bosnia was "defined by the stećci and Bosnia’s stigma regarding the question of it being the poetic subject response: its defiance from dreams." Dizdar used the symbols and inscriptions on the stećci to give Kameni spavač a historical point of view, by envisioning the world through the eyes of the medieval peoples buried under the stećci. By envisioning the world through the eyes of the stone sleepers buried under the stećci, Dizdar was able to discuss many themes. Through the stećci, he discussed themes of "the intimate life journey of origin, of homeland or landscapes, of sources of knowledge, of experiences of the world, of a new and coordinated deciphering of signs, which reach pass their singularity."

Dizdar said that the themes expressed in the inscriptions were the “secrets of Bosnia.” Dizdar himself described the importance and mystery of the stećci by saying “stećak is for me what it is not for others, things that are on them or in them, others did not inscribe or knew to see. It is stone, but also a word, it is earth, but also heaven, it is matter, but also a spirit, it is a cry, but also a song, it is death, but also life, it is the past, but also the future.”

Mak Dizdar also fought against the forced influence of Serbicisms on the Bosnian colloquial vernacular, in his 1970 article "Marginalije o jeziku i oko njega".

After the collapse of Communism and following the war in Bosnia and Herzegovina, Dizdar's poetic magnum opus has remained the cornerstone of modern Bosnia and Herzegovina literature.
