= Hamid Dizdar =

Bosnian writer and poet (1907–1967)

- Born: 22 February 1907; Stolac, Condominium of Bosnia and Herzegovina, Austria-Hungary
- Died: 17 July 1967 (aged 60); Sarajevo, SR Bosnia and Herzegovina, SFR Yugoslavia
- Occupation: Writer

Hamid Dizdar (22 February 1907 – 17 July 1967) was a Bosnian writer and poet. His younger brother Mak Dizdar was also a prominent poet.

Hamid Dizdar was born to a Muslim family in Stolac, Bosnia and Herzegovina, de facto part of the Austro-Hungarian Empire, but de jure in the Ottoman Empire until the following year. He was the son of Muharem (died 1923) and Nezira (née Babović; 1881–1945). Hamid was the oldest of three children. His younger brother Mehmedalija went on to become a celebrated poet, known by the name Mak Dizdar. Hamid's sister Refika (1921–1945) and mother Nezira were killed in the Jasenovac concentration camp.

Dizdar worked as a clerk in his hometown Stolac before becoming an editor in Sarajevo for the newspapers Slobodna riječ, Jugoslavenska pošta, Pravda, and Gajret. After the Second World War, Dizdar became the Director of the Archives of the City of Sarajevo. He edited the magazines Odjek, Vidik and Život. He began writing poetry while working as a social writer, and appeared in Knjiga drugova (Book of Comrades) in 1929.

== Bibliography ==
- Arabeske
- Kasaba šapče
- Zapisi u kamenu
- Obasjane staze
- Niko se ne vraća
- Proljeće u Hercegovini
