= Can Dizdar =

Turkish diplomat

Can Dizdar is a Turkish diplomat who currently is the Turkish ambassador to Canada. He previously served as the Turkish ambassador to the United Arab Emirates.

== Education ==
Dizdar received his B.A. in political science from Ankara University, Turkey, in 1989, and his M.A. at the College of Europe in Bruges, Belgium, in 1994. He also attended the Royal College of Defense Studies, in London, in 2004.

== Career ==
After joining the Turkish Ministry of Foreign Affairs, Dizdar served abroad at the Turkish embassies in Helsinki (1995–1997), Abu Dhabi (1997–1999), London (2001–2005), and at the Turkish Permanent Mission to the United Nations in New York (2007–2010). Subsequently, Dizdar worked at the UN Department of Political Affairs in New York City, as a Senior Political Officer (2010–2011).

At the Turkish Ministry of Foreign Affairs Headquarters in Ankara, Dizdar worked at the EU and Cyprus Departments, served as the Head of Department at the Policy Planning Division (2005–2007), Deputy Director General for the Middle East (2011–2014) and Director General for the Middle East (2014–2016).

Between 2016 and 2021, Dizdar served as the Turkish ambassador to the United Arab Emirates.

After serving as the Director General for the Middle East at the Turkish Ministry of Foreign Affairs between 2021 and 2024, Dizdar was appointed on July 3, 2024 as the Turkish ambassador to Canada.

== Personal life ==
Can Dizdar is married to Demet Dizdar. He has a son.
