= Humber Summit =

Coordinates: 43.757°N 79.572°W

- Neighbourhood
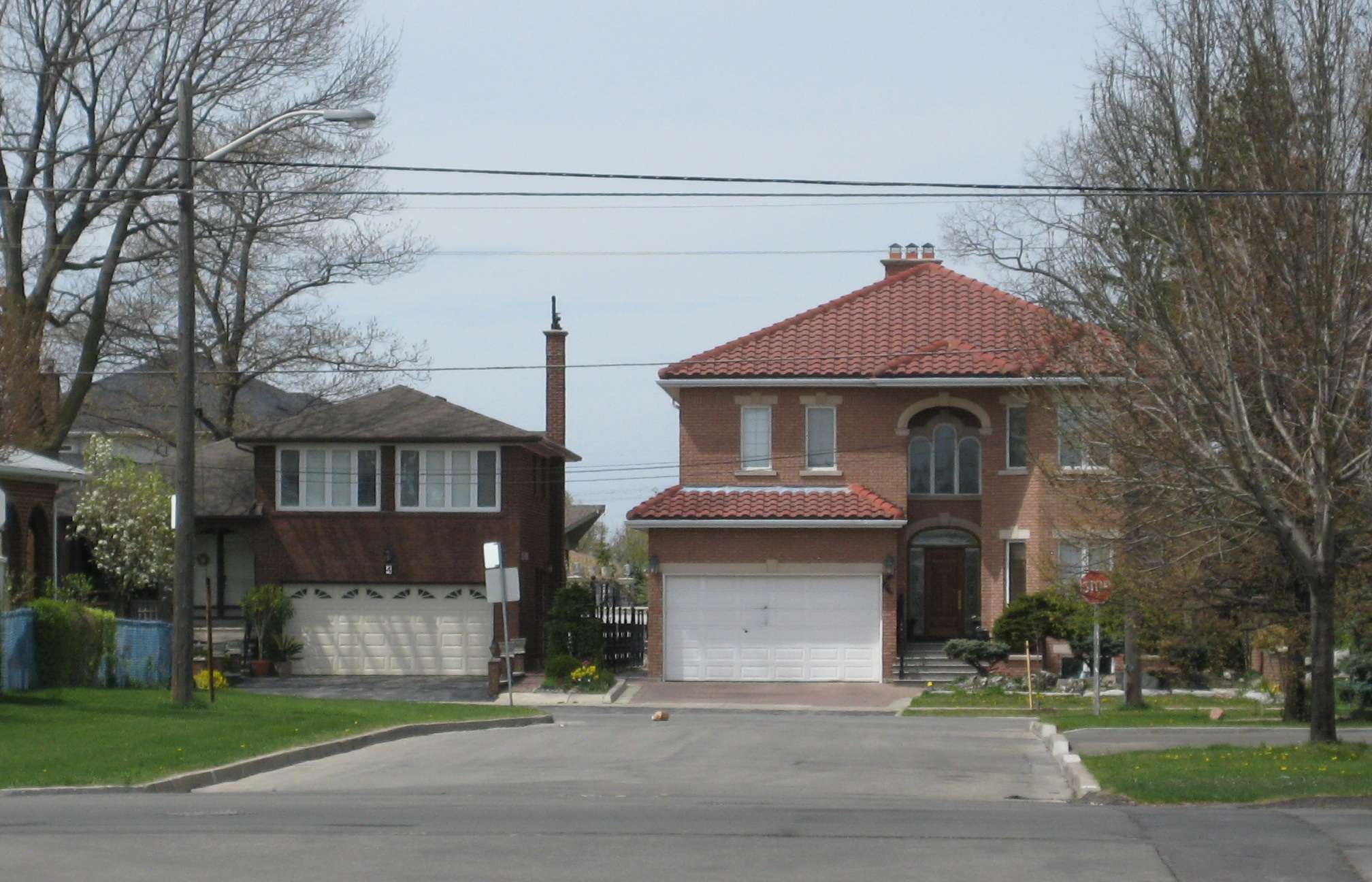
- Residences in Humber Summit

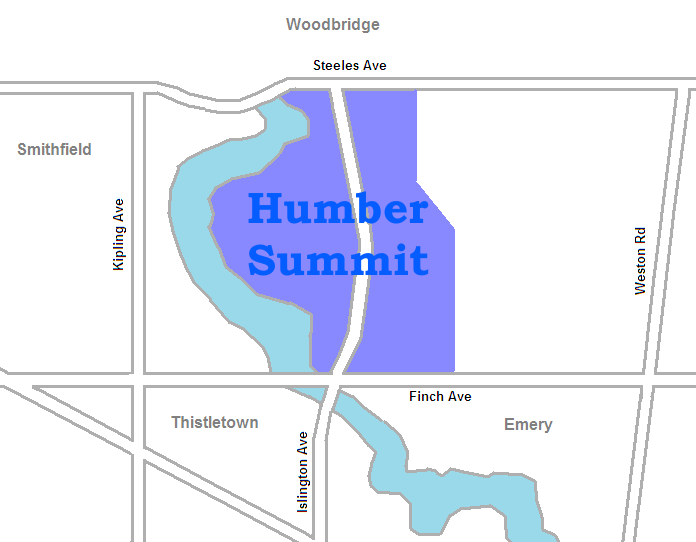
- Country: Canada
- Province: Ontario
- City: Toronto
- Municipality established: 1850 York Township
- Changed municipality: 1922 North York from York Township
- Changed municipality: 1998 Toronto from North York

Government
  - MP: Judy Sgro
  - MPP: Tom Rakocevic
  - Councillor: Anthony Perruzza

Population (2021)
  - Total: 12,185
  - Density: 1,570/km^{2} (4,100/sq mi)

Humber Summit is a neighbourhood in Toronto, Ontario, Canada. It is one of the northernmost neighbourhoods in Toronto, located in the North York district of the city. It is bounded by Steeles Avenue to the north, Highway 400 to the east, Finch Avenue to the south, and follows the Humber River (east branch) to the west.

== History ==
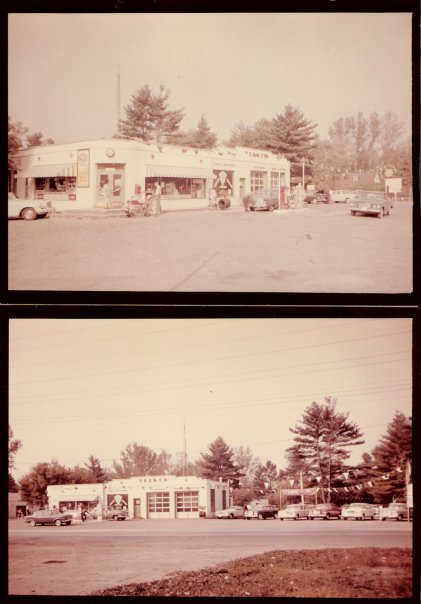
Service station at Islington & Whitfield in Humber Summit, circa 1960's.

In the 1840s, Humber Summit began as a pioneer community, centred on the grist and saw mills. However, as the city boundaries crept closer, the area evolved into a resort community, called Riverbend Park. In 1953, the area, along with the rest of North York, was severed from York County, joining other municipalities south of Steeles Avenue to form the regional government of Metropolitan Toronto.

It became home to many Toronto residents who built cottages on the banks of the Humber River. When Hurricane Hazel hit Toronto in 1954, many of the cottages were swept away by the overflowing river. In 1998, the neighbourhood was amalgamated into the new City of Toronto.

Today, Humber Summit is a middle class community. It contains a significant, well-established Italian community, but has also become the home for new East Indian and Asian families. The residences are generally semi-detached backsplits with built-in garages. Adding to the character of the suburban post-World War II 1960s homes are front porches decorated with cast-iron railings, and elaborate front archways.

== Education ==
Two public school boards operate schools in Humber Summit, the separate Toronto Catholic District School Board (TCDSB), and the secular Toronto District School Board (TDSB).

Both TCDSB and TDSB operate public elementary and middle schools in the neighbourhood. TCDSB operates St. Roch Catholic School on Duncanwoods Drive, and Venerable John Merlini Catholic School on Whitfield Avenue. TDSB operates two institutions that provide primary education, Gracedale Public School on Gracedale Boulevard, and Humber Summit Middle School, formerly Humbermede Junior High School - from 1970, G.B. Warren Junior High School - on Pearldale Avenue. Previously, TCDSB operated St. Gaspar Catholic School on Plunkett Drive that opened in 1972 and closed in 2002, with the building demolished as of 2018.

Neither school board operate a secondary school in the neighbourhood, with TDSB secondary school students residing in Humber Summit attending institutions in adjacent neighbourhoods. The French first language public secular school board, Conseil scolaire Viamonde, and it separate counterpart, Conseil scolaire catholique MonAvenir also offer schooling to applicable residents of Humber Summit, although they do not operate a school in the neighbourhood. CSCM and CSV students attend schools situated in other neighbourhoods in Toronto.

== Demographics ==
Total population (2021): 12,185

Major ethnic populations (2021):

- 34.3% White; 21.5% Italian, 4.6% Canadians
- 30.8% South Asian; 11.0% East Indian
- 11.2% Black; 2.9% Jamaican
- 5.5% Latin American (of any race)

Total population (2016): 12,416

Major ethnic populations (2016):

- 34.4% White; 24.0% Italian, 7.9% Canadians
- 28.9% South Asian; 16.0% East Indian
- 14.8% Black; 7.9% Jamaican
- 7.2% Latin American (of any race)

Total population (2011): 12,525

Major ethnic populations (2011):

- 41.0% White; 30.2% Italian, 4.0% Canadians
- 31.8% South Asian; 22.3% East Indian
- 9.5% Black
- 4.4% Latin American (of any race)

Total population (2006): 12,755

Major ethnic populations (2006):

- 46.1% White; 34.5% Italian, 5.2% Canadians
- 28.3% South Asian; 18.7% East Indian
- 10.5% Black; 7.9% Jamaican
- 5.4% Latin American (of any race)

Total population (2001): 12,515

Major ethnic populations (2001):

- 51.7% White; 39.5% Italian, 7.4% Canadians
- 20.3% South Asian; 13.7% East Indian
- 12.5% Black; 7.2% Jamaican
- 3.5% Latin American (of any race)

== Recreation ==
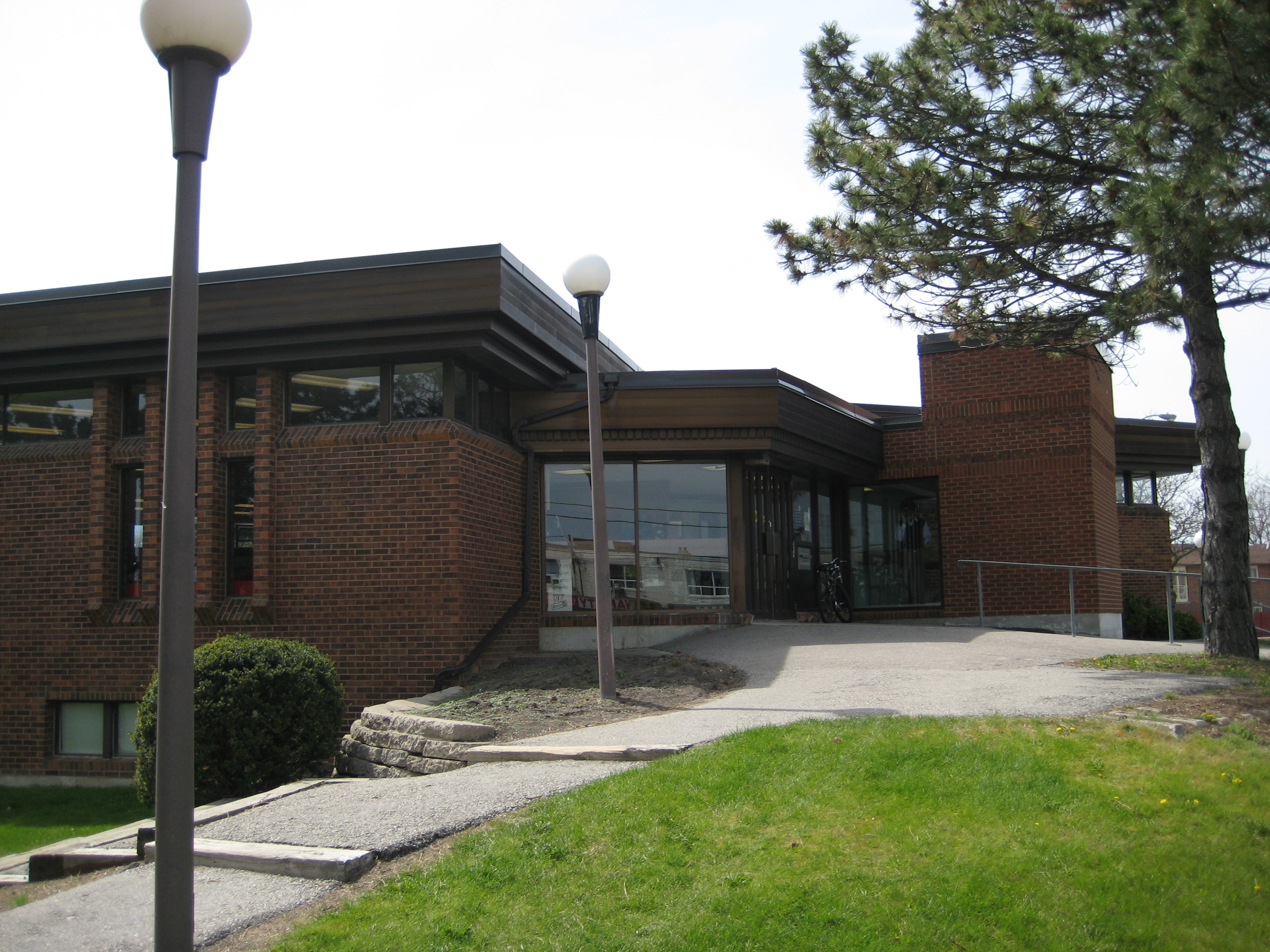
Humber Summit branch of Toronto Public Library was opened in 1974.

The Toronto Parks, Forestry and Recreation Division manages a number of municipal parks in Humber Summit, including Apted Park, Gracedale Park, and Rowntree Mill Park. The latter park is situated near the Humber Valley. The Humber Valley forms a part of the Toronto ravine system.

The Humber Summit branch of the Toronto Public Library (TPL) located at 2990 Islington Avenue. The library was opened by predecessor of TPL, the North York Public Library Board, on 15 May 1974. It was the first branch in North York to be in a shared facility with another community agency (the North York Parks and Recreation Department.)

== Transportation ==
Several major roadways pass through the neighbourhood, including Finch Avenue, Steeles Avenue, Weston Road, and Highway 400, a major north-south controlled access highway that connects the northern areas of Greater Toronto with the city. Steeles Avenue serves as Humber Summit's northern boundary, whereas Finch Avenue serves as the city's southern boundary.

Public transit is provided by the Toronto Transit Commission's (TTC) bus system. In addition to the TTC, bus routes provided by York Region Transit is also accessible from Humber Summit, providing access to York Region.
