= Tsawwassen Mills =

Shopping mall in Metro Vancouver, British Columbia, Canada

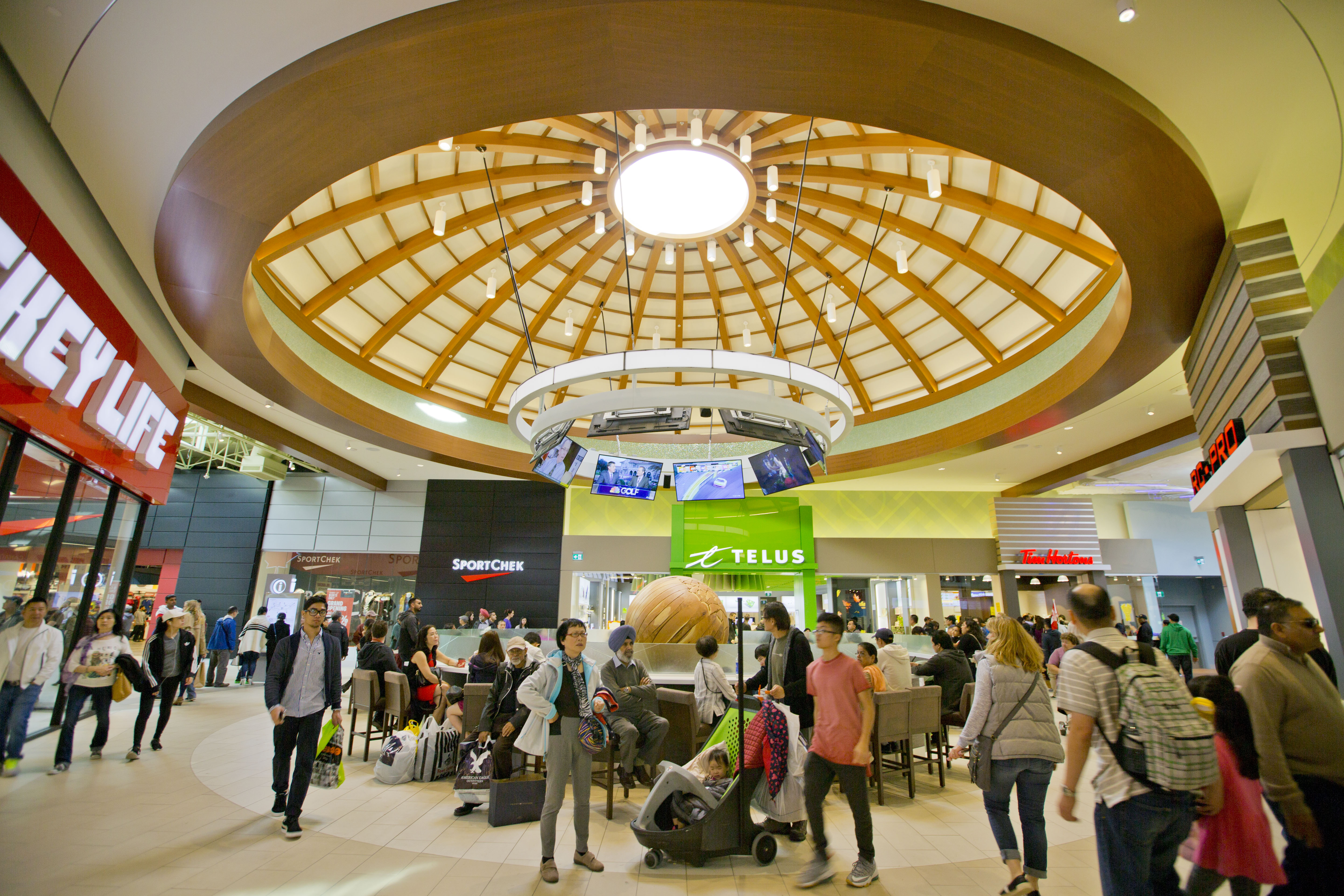
- Interior view (October 2016)
- Location: Delta, British Columbia, Canada
- Coordinates: 49.0381°N 123.0860°W
- Address: 5000 Canoe Pass Way, V4M 0B3
- Opened: October 5, 2016; 10 years ago
- Developer: Ivanhoé Cambridge
- Manager: Central Walk
- Owner: Ruby Liu (Central Walk)
- Architect: Stantec and JPRA Architects; RJC Engineers
- Num. of stores: 200+ (at peak)
- Num. of anchor tenants: 13 (at peak)
- Floor area: 110,000 square metres (1,200,000 sq ft)
- Floors: 1
- Parking: Parking lot with 6,000 free spaces (75 handicap, 14 EV and 22 Modo/Evo)
- Website: www.tsawwassenmills.com www.tsawwassencommons.ca
- Building details
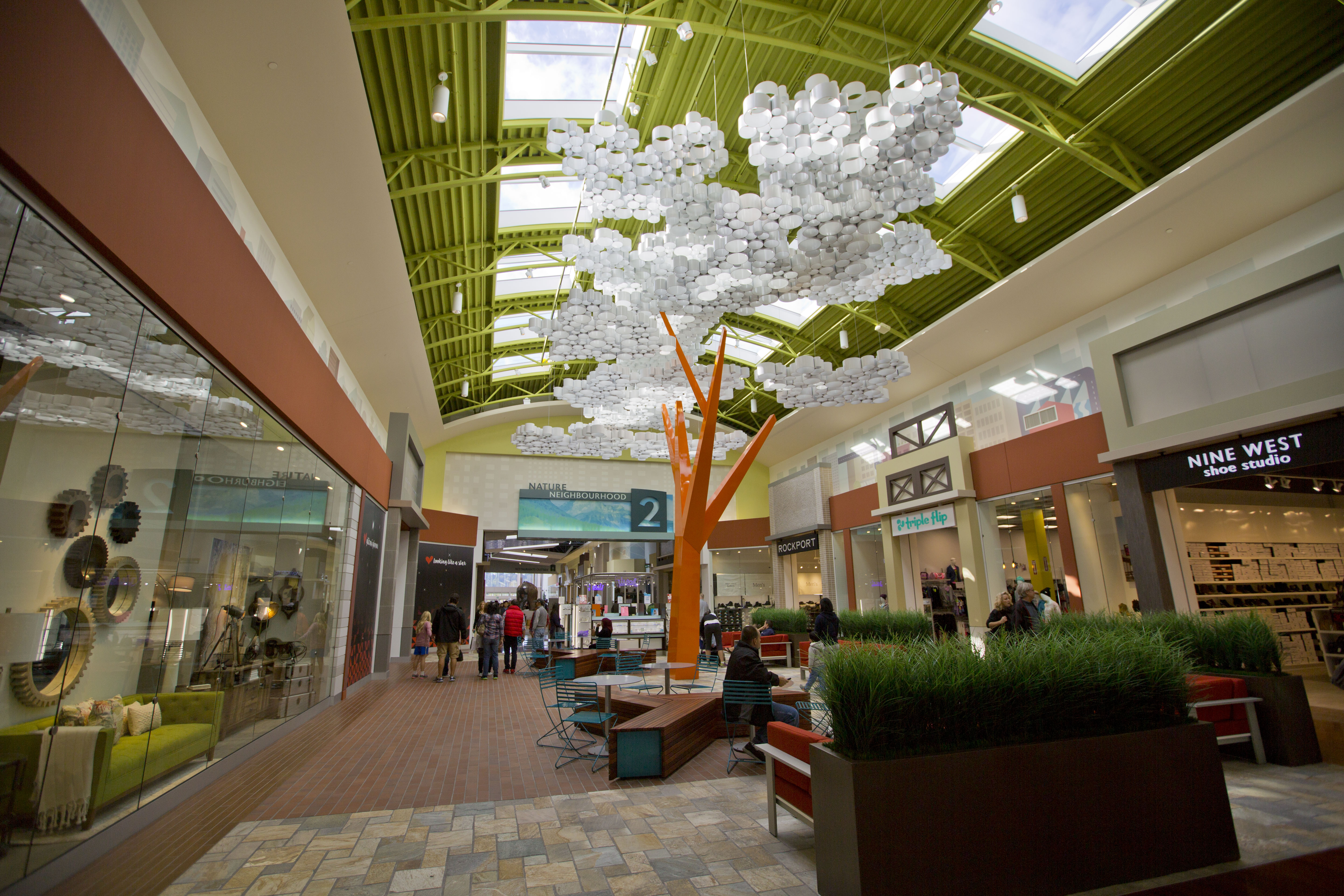
- Nature Neighbourhood 2 (October 2016)

General information
- Status: Operational
- Construction started: January 2014; 12 years ago
- Completed: 2016

Design and construction
- Main contractor: Ledcor Construction

Tsawwassen Mills (English: /təˈwɑːsən/ tə-WAH-sən) is a super-regional outlet centre on Tsawwassen First Nation land, in Delta, British Columbia. The mall was developed by Ivanhoé Cambridge and opened on October 5, 2016. It features 110,000 square metres (1,200,000 sq ft) of retail space and a ≈1,100-seat food hall.

Despite the term "Mills" in the mall's name, alongside featuring a single-story themed layout, The Mills Corporation and Simon Property Group were never involved with the mall's development or operations. Ivanhoé Cambridge purely designed the shopping centre this way as an inspiration. As of May 2022, the mall has been owned and operated by Ruby Liu of Central Walk.

== Overview ==
Tsawwassen Mills is the second and last Landmark Mills mall to be independently developed by Ivanhoé Cambridge, the first being CrossIron Mills. It is the final outlet mall to use the Landmark Mills architectural template, which featured neighbourhoods and a mix of outlet and entertainment tenants in a single-story layout. The last Mills mall developed by Ivanhoé Cambridge's predecessor, The Mills Corporation, is Pittsburgh Mills in Frazer Township.

== History ==
=== Background ===
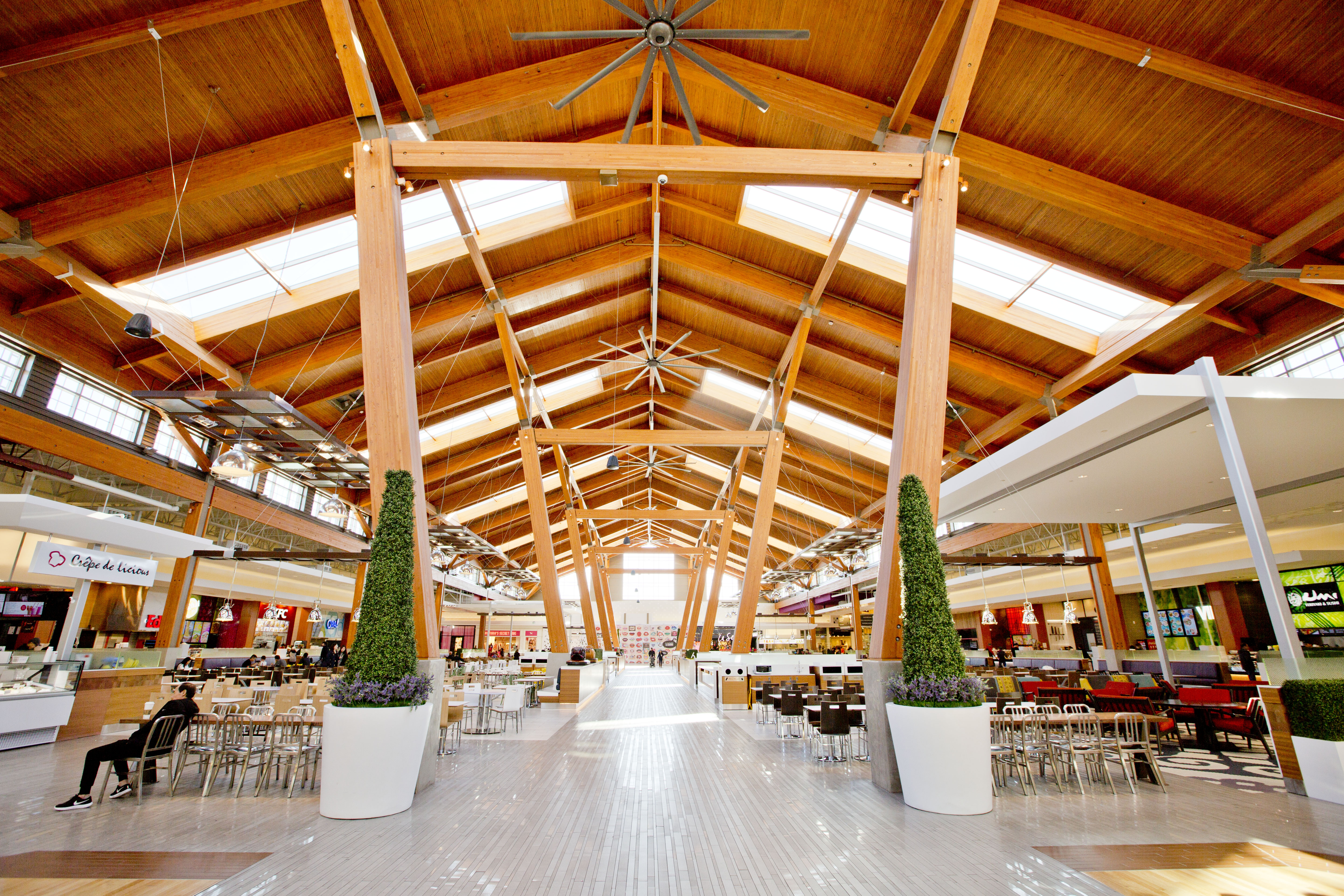
Food court (October 2017)

The possibility for Tsawwassen Mills dates back to 2003, when Ivanhoé Cambridge had plans to develop four Landmark Mills malls in Canada with the Arlington, Virginia-based Mills Corporation, one of which was going to be in Metro Vancouver, and another being the then-under-construction Vaughan Mills. However, in May 2006, The Mills Corp. was undergoing an investigation by the United States Securities and Exchange Commission due to accounting irregularities and fraudulent transactions. As a result, they sold their Canadian assets to Ivanhoé Cambridge in August of that year for CA$1.1 billion.

Tsawwassen Mills' site's possibility was established on April 3, 2009, when the Tsawwassen First Nation Final Agreement came into effect. This was the first urban modern treaty in British Columbia, granting the TFN self-government authority and ownership of approximately 724 hectares (1,790 acres) of land. This legal framework allowed the nation to pursue major economic development projects on their lands to generate revenue for social programs and community infrastructure.

=== 2011–2016: Planning and construction ===
In April 2011, the TFN Economic Development Corporation entered into a pivotal partnership to develop their commercial lands. A Memorandum of Agreement was signed with Ivanhoé Cambridge—a subsidiary of Caisse de dépôt et placement du Québec—to develop the shopping centre, alongside Property Development Group which would develop the adjacent Tsawwassen Commons, as Ivanhoé Cambridge already had plans to develop a Mills-branded mall in Metro Vancouver. Extensive groundwork was required to transform the agricultural land into a commercial site with 107 acres (43 ha). The architectural firm Stantec was hired as the lead designer, alongside the engineering firm RJC, which would use graphics heavily influenced by Coast Salish culture. It would incorporate indigenous art, basket weaving patterns, and heavy timber elements to support local heritage. Tsawwassen Mills would also be proposed as a hybrid-outlet mall that would include outlet stores, a ≈1,100-seat food court, and entertainment following the success of CrossIron Mills, which opened in August 2009, and Vaughan Mills which opened in November 2004.

The shopping centre broke ground in January 2014, with approximately 1,800 jobs created during main construction and 4,500 for peak construction. By May 2016, it was estimated that over 3,000 part-time and full employees would service the mall. Ivanhoé Cambridge invested in CA$600 million to develop Tsawwassen Mills.

=== 2016–2017: Grand opening celebration and one-year anniversary ===
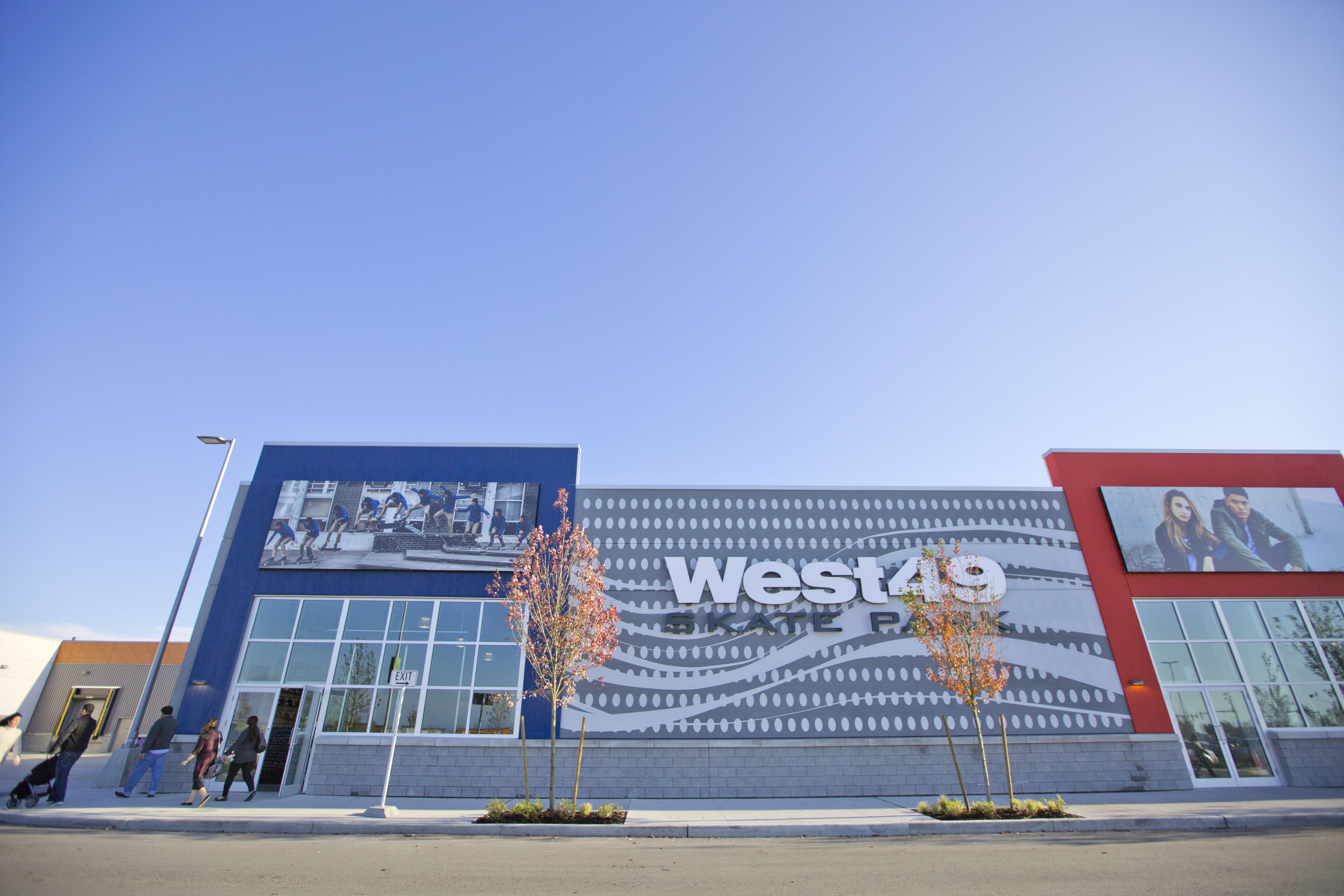
West 49 Skate Park (October 2016)

Tsawwassen Mills had its grand opening celebration on October 5, 2016 at 10:30 a.m. PDT, with attendees lining up as early as 1:30 a.m. PDT. The shopping centre was an immediate success, attracting 284,000 shoppers in its first six days. On opening day, the mall featured 180 tenants active, including 13 anchor stores. Original stores, most of which being "first-to-market", included Bass Pro Shops Outdoor World, The Children's Place Outlet, DSW, Michael Kors Outlet, and Saks Off 5th. Tsawwassen Mills features five themed concourses known as neighbourhoods, being Fashion, Nature, City, Coast Salish, and Outdoor Life. The "courts" for the neighbourhoods include Community Court, Play Court, Bird Court, Festival Court, and Sport Court. The mall itself was pre-certified by LEED. The grand opening attracted over 50,000 people and caused traffic jams in the parking lot and surrounding streets, reported by October 10.

The mall celebrated its first anniversary in October 2017, alongside the debut of MAC Cosmetics and Caposhie.

=== 2020–present ===
Due to the COVID-19 pandemic, the mall reduced operating hours in March 2020. Some tenants were temporarily closed. In May 2022, Ivanhoé Cambridge sold Tsawwassen Mills to Chinese-based Ruby Liu, through her real estate arm Central Walk. The exact price for the sale was not publicly disclosed. In late July 2024, the Dream Box immersive cinema opened.

In May 2025, a 180-foot-long romance-themed concourse called Lover's Lane was announced to be added. In June 2025, Central Walk announced plans to transform Tsawwassen Mills into a "shoppertainment" destination with family-friendly initiatives, working closely with the Tsawwassen First Nation. This would include a 2,200 m^{2} (24,000 sq ft) Asian Fusion food hall known as TM Wander, with live entertainment (including concerts) and 18 kiosks. Unlike traditional food courts, TM Wander would have extended operation hours, allowing it to stay open even while the main shopping centre is closed. The former Saks Off 5th—previously operated by Hudson's Bay Company—was taken over by Ruby Liu on June 26, 2025. She plans to convert the vacant space into a "cultural tourist and retail destination."

Outdoor event space, including a volleyball and pickleball venue known as The Nest would be constructed between Entrances 3 and 4, alongside a September debut of Lee's Donuts. In December 2025, a vacant space at the adjacent Tsawwassen Commons was converted into South Delta After Hours Urgent and Primary Care Centre. In March 2026, Commons was announced to have the potential for the addition of 9,300 m^{2} (100,000 sq ft). TM Wander Asian Food Hall opened on May 30 of that year, with a ribbon-cutting ceremony and lion and dragon dances, while the Nest sports facility followed in late July.

In early October 2026, Tsawwassen Mills celebrated its 10th anniversary, with Central Walk planning to add H Mart, which will open in December 2027 as a 30,000 sq ft (2,800 m^{2}) anchor.

== Tsawwassen Commons ==
Adjacent to Tsawwassen Mills is Tsawwassen Commons, a 51,097-square-metre (550,000 sq ft) power centre. Unlike the outlet mall, Tsawwassen Commons was developed by Property Development Group. It is also adjacent to Delta Port, a business park, and features six tenants, notable ones being Staples, Canadian Tire, PetSmart and HomeSense.

== Gallery ==
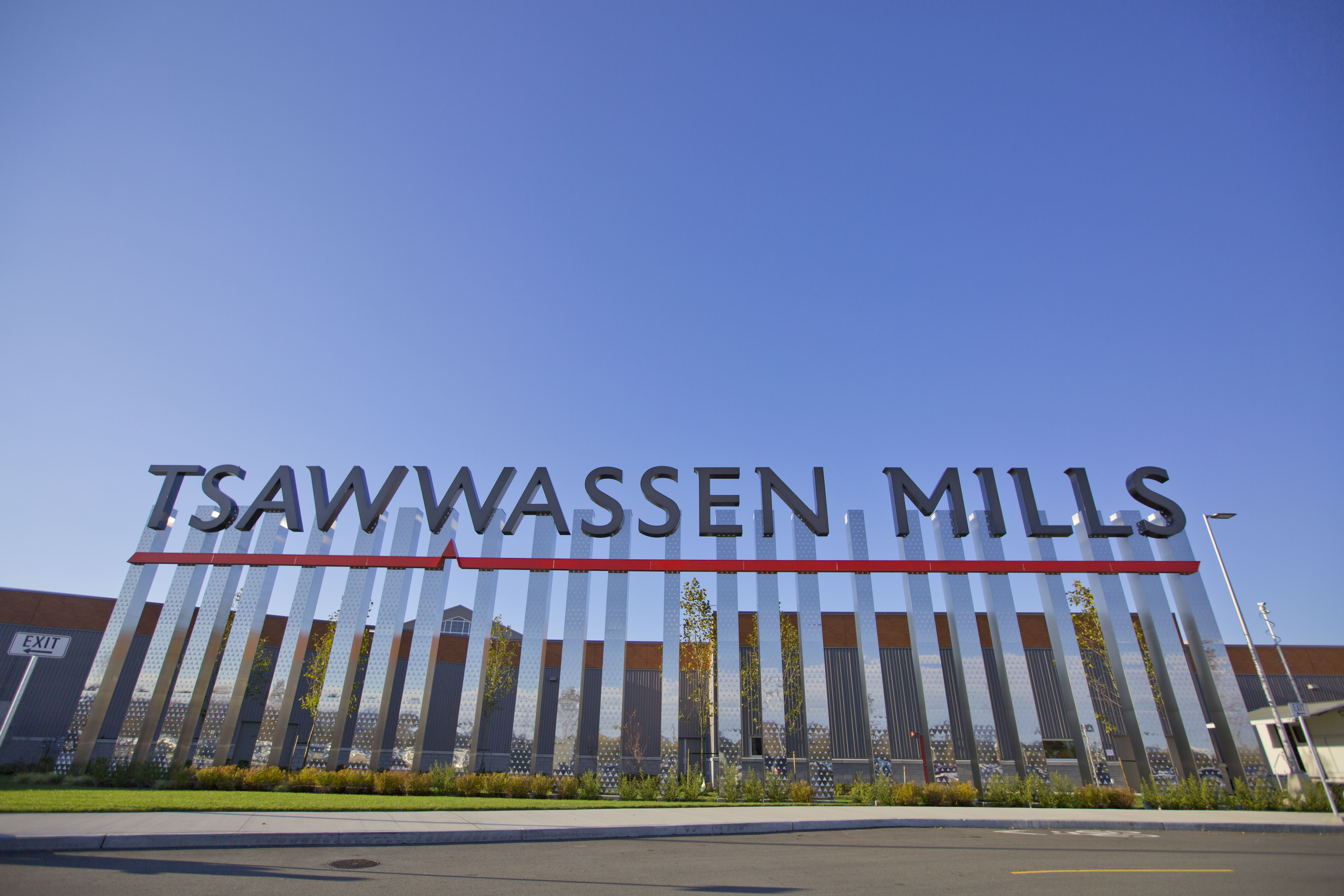
The mall's entrance (October 2016)

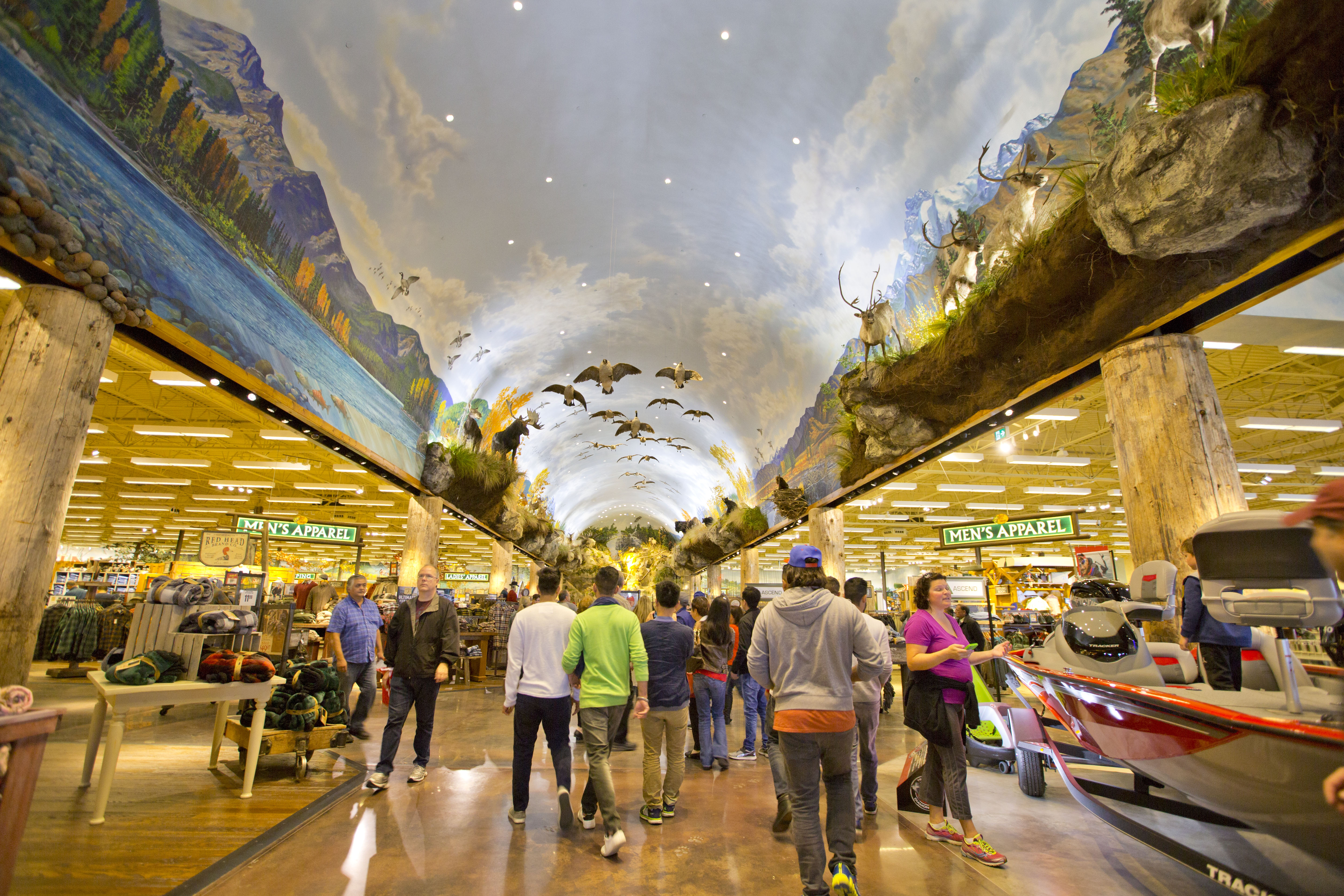
Interior of Bass Pro Shops (October 2016)

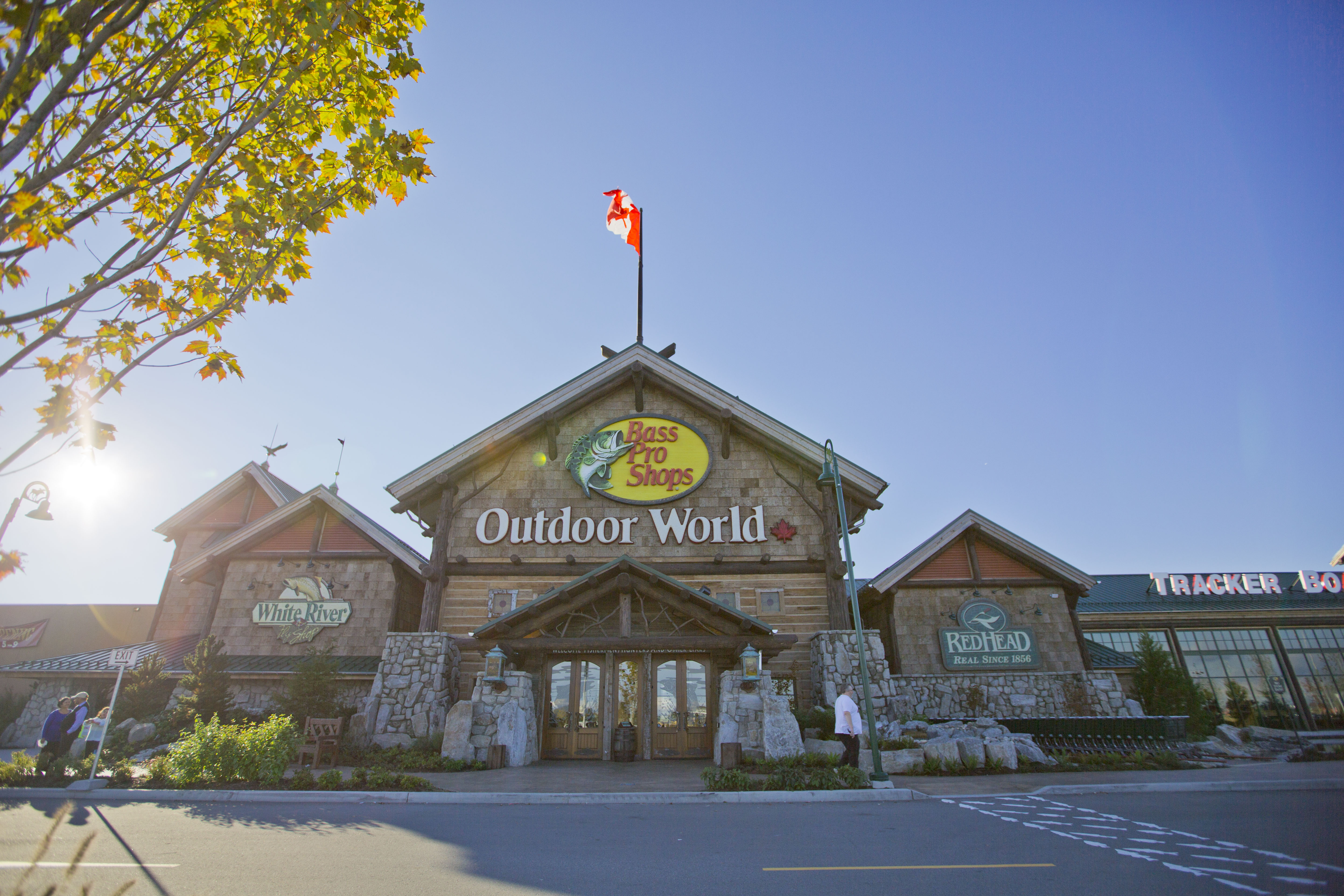
Bass Pro Shops Outdoor World entrance (October 2016)

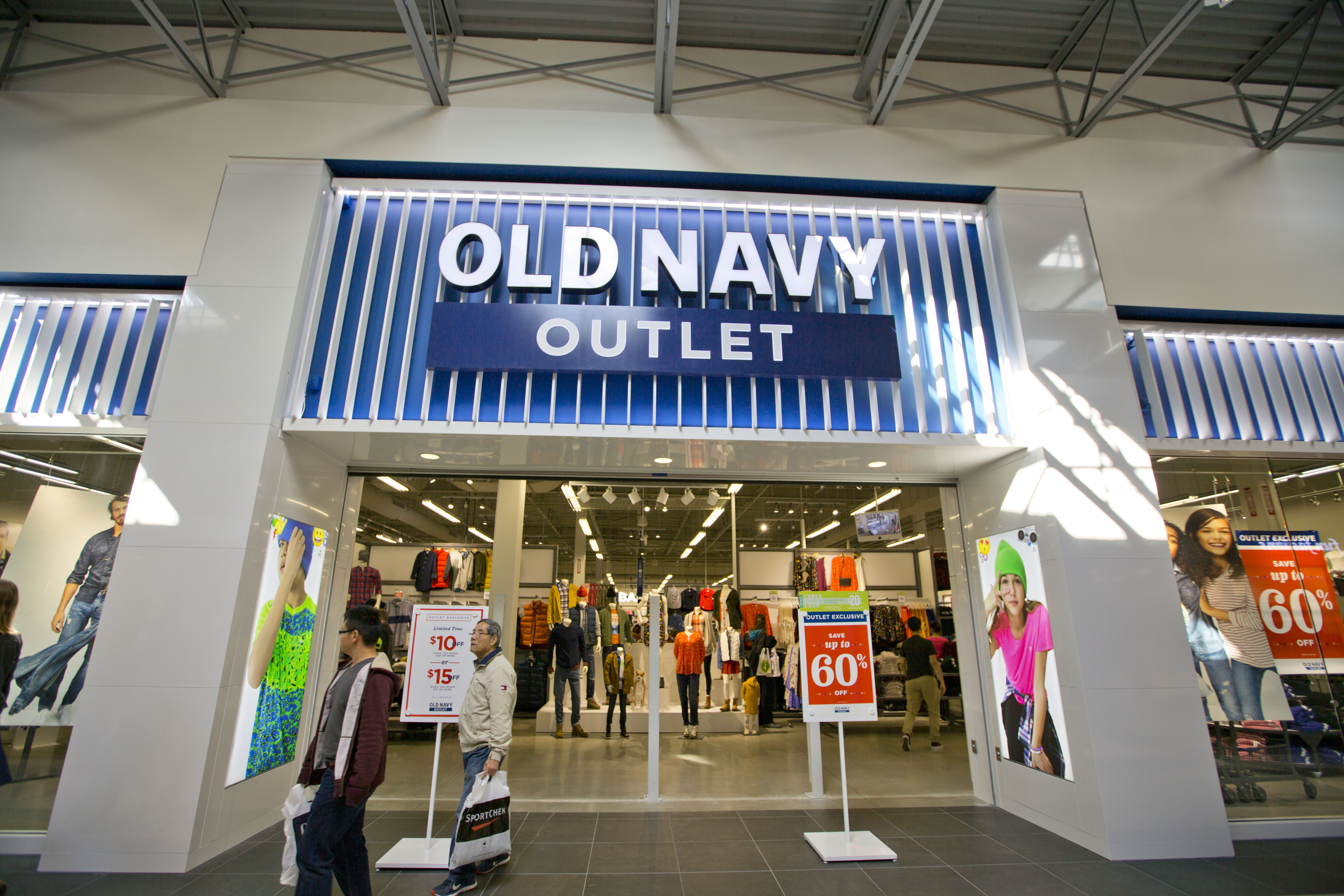
Old Navy Outlet

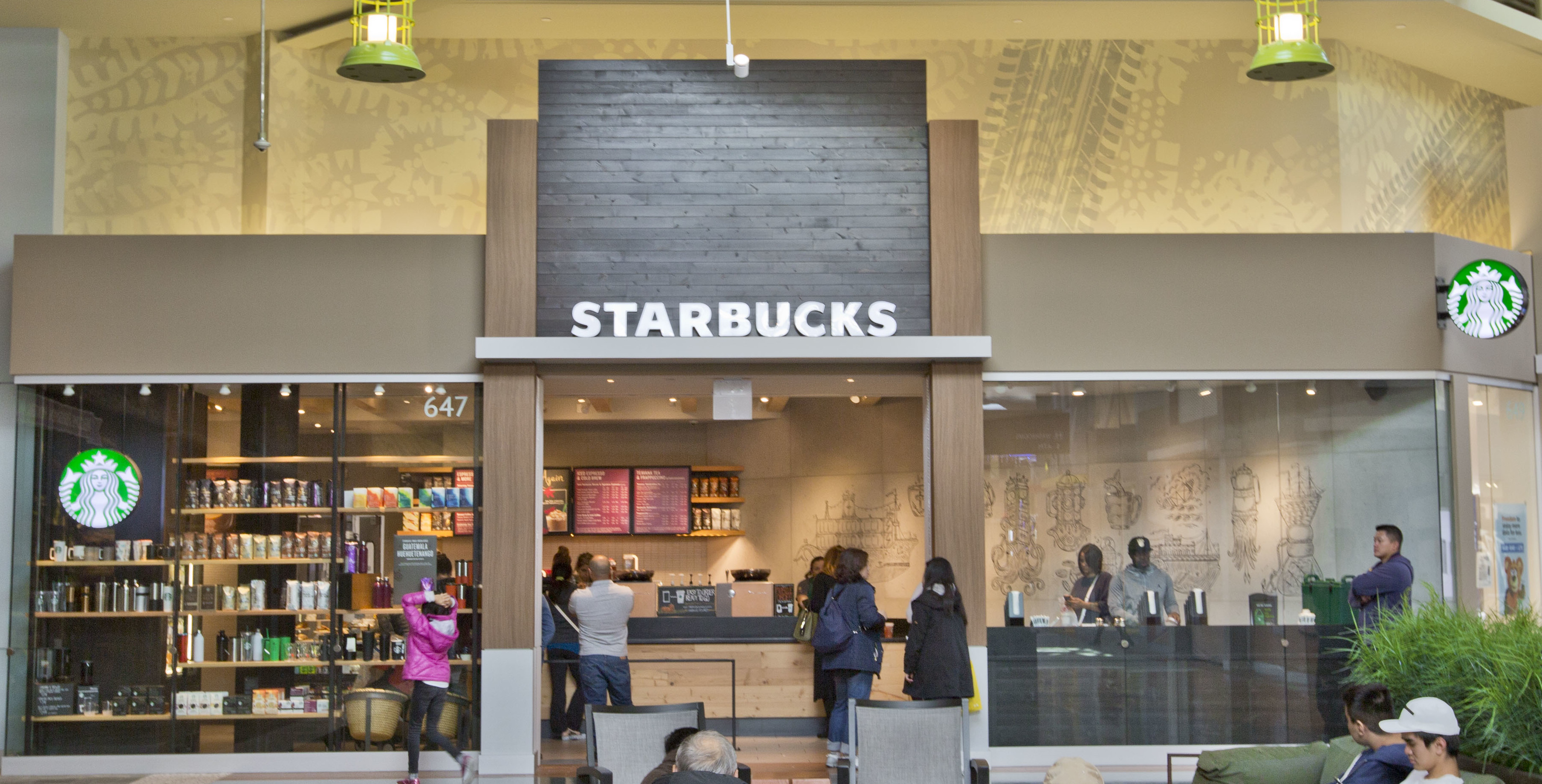
Starbucks Coffee (October 2017)

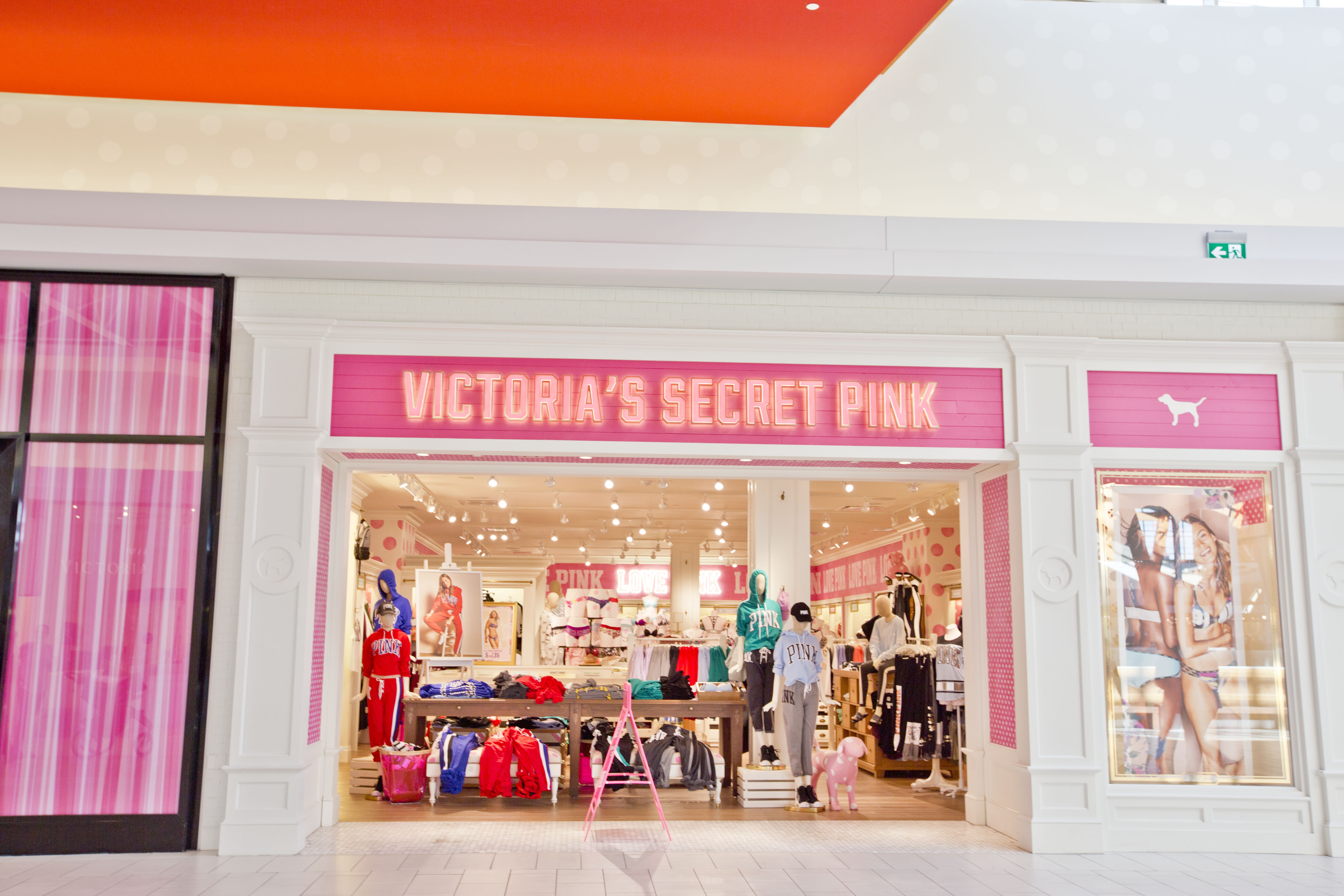
Victoria's Secret PINK (October 2017)

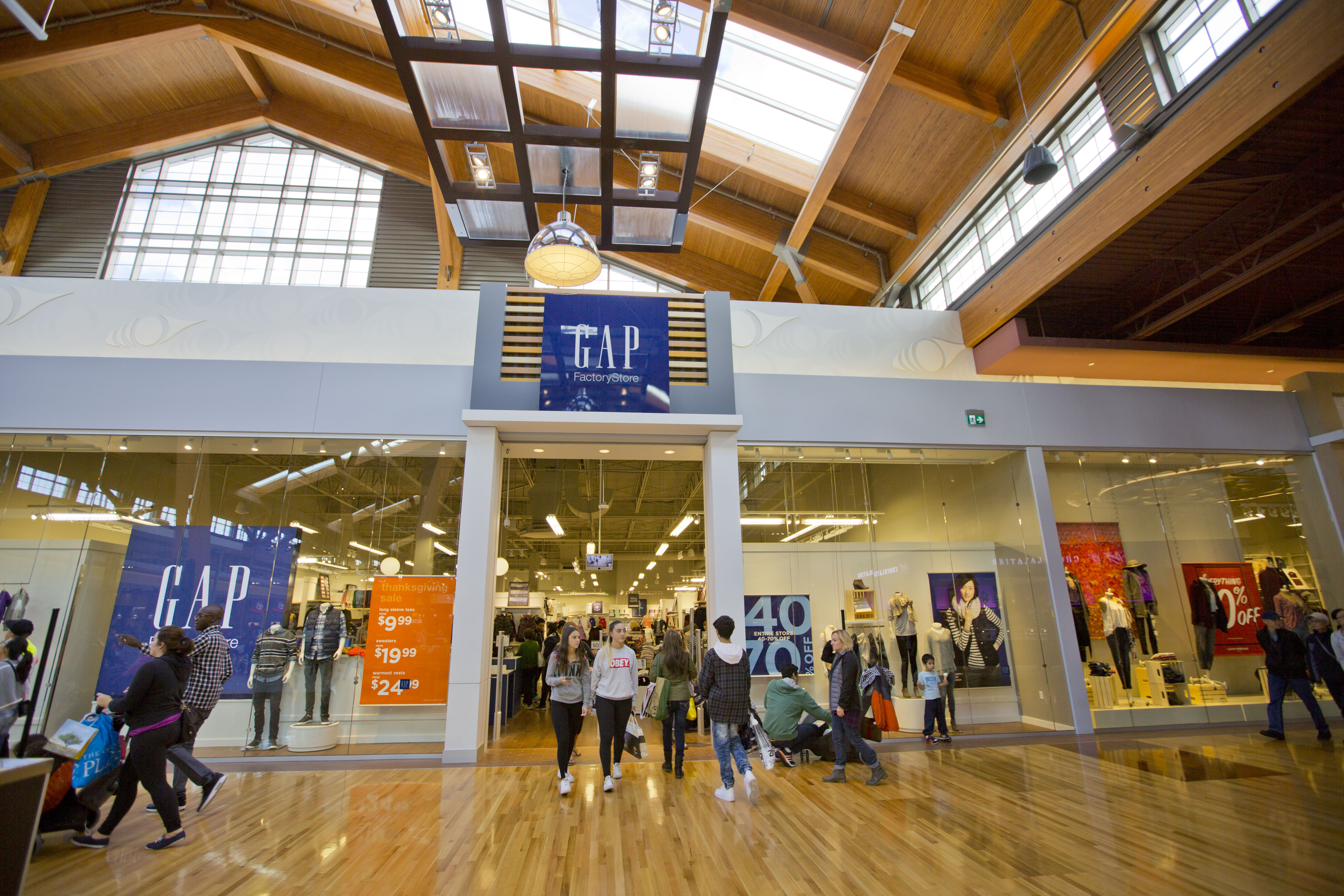
Gap Factory Store (October 2017)
