= Woodgrove Centre =

Shopping mall in Vancouver, British Columbia

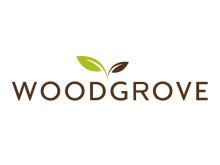
- Location: 6631 Island Highway North; Nanaimo, British Columbia; V9T 4T7
- Coordinates: 49.23658°N 124.05051°W
- Opened: September 30, 1981; 45 years ago
- Manager: Central Walk
- Owner: Central Walk
- Num. of stores: 150
- Num. of anchor tenants: 8
- Floor area: 751,713 square feet
- Floors: 1 (2 in former Hudson's Bay department store)
- Website: www.woodgrovecentre.com

Woodgrove Centre is a shopping centre on Vancouver Island in the harbour city of Nanaimo, British Columbia.

Woodgrove Centre features 724,713 square feet (67,328.0 m^{2}) of retail space and is Vancouver Island's largest shopping centre. The centre has over 150 stores, among them are Walmart Canada, Toys "R" Us, Winners, Sport Chek, Save-On-Foods, Chapters and Landmark Cinemas.

Woodgrove is owned and managed by Central Walk, a subsidiary of Ruby Liu Commercial Investment Corporation led by Liu Weihong.

== History ==
Woodgrove Centre opened in 1981 with Eaton's and Woodward's as its tenants. Woodward's closed in 1993 and the space was taken over by The Bay (Hudson's Bay Company). Eaton's closed in 1999 following bankruptcy. In 2000, the mall was expanded from 530,000 square feet to 724,713. The Bay moved to the former Eaton's location. The old Bay/Woodward's space was demolished for a Walmart location which opened on July 11, 2002 after the Country Club Centre location closed the previous day.

On September 1, 2020, Weihong Liu of Central Walk bought the property from Ivanhoe Cambridge.

== Anchors ==
=== Current anchors ===
- SportChek (opened 2000)
- Walmart (opened 2002)
- Winners (opened 2000)

=== Former anchors ===
- Hudson's Bay (The Bay) (opened 1993, closed 2025)
- Toys "R" Us (opened 1994, closed in late 2025)
- Eaton's (closed 1999 and replaced with a relocated Bay store)
- Marks & Spencer (closed 1993)
- SAAN (closed late 1990s)
- Safeway (closed 1994 and replaced with Toys "R" Us)
- Sports Experts (closed 1993)
- Woodward's (closed 1993 and replaced with The Bay)
- Woodwynn (closed 1995)
