= Vaughan Mills =

Shopping mall in Greater Toronto, Ontario, Canada

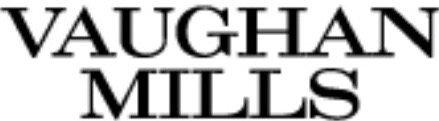

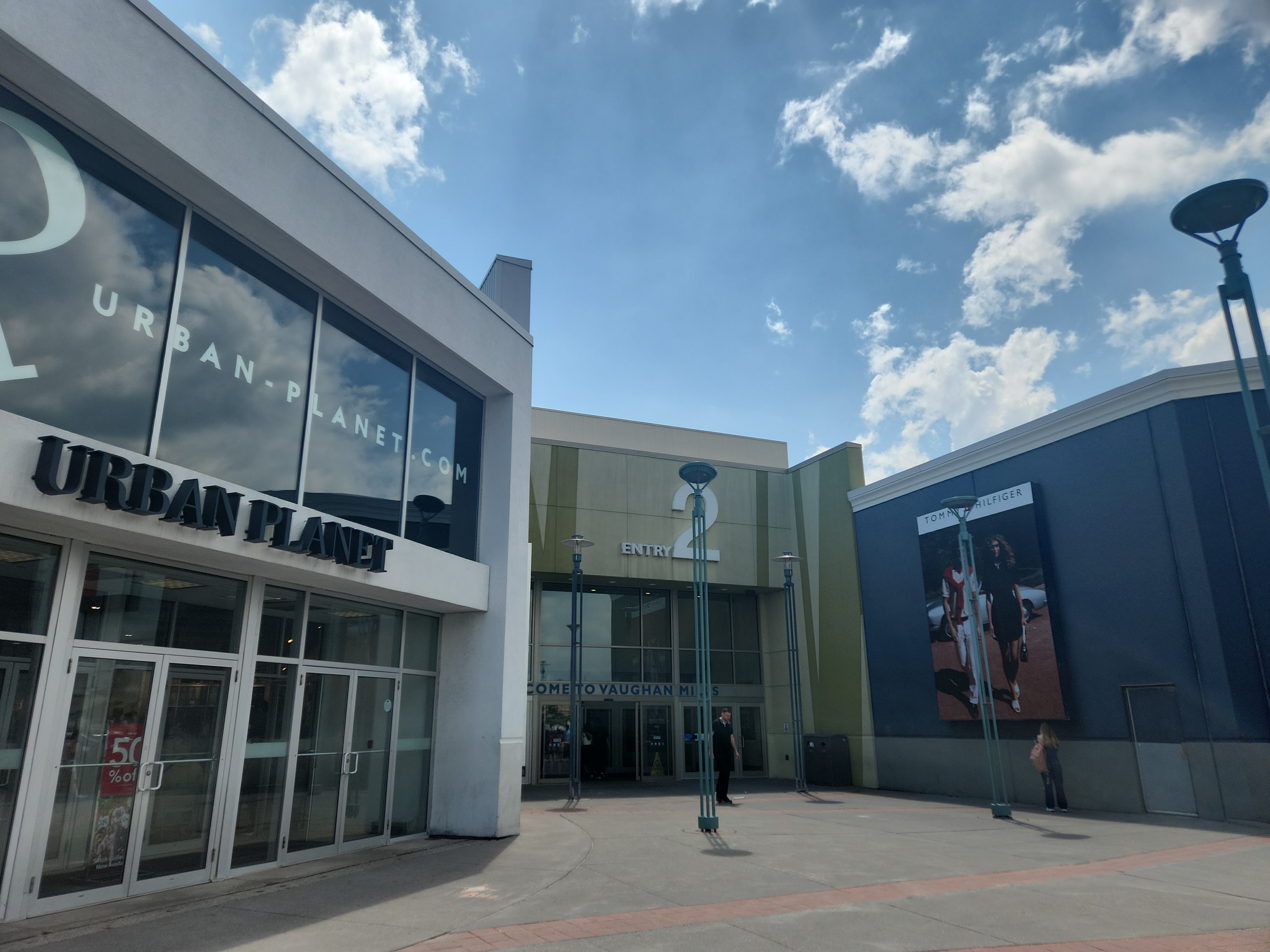
- Entry 2 (July 2025)
- Location: Vaughan, Ontario, Canada
- Coordinates: 43°49′31.75″N 79°32′20.32″W
- Address: 1 Bass Pro Mills Drive
- Opened: November 4, 2004; 22 years ago
- Renovated: 2017
- Developer: The Mills Corporation; Ivanhoé Cambridge
- Manager: JLL Properties
- Owner: Ivanhoé Cambridge (trading as La Caisse) (51%); LaSalle Investment Management (49%)
- Architect: B+H Architects; JPRA Architects
- Num. of stores: 250+ (at peak)
- Num. of anchor tenants: 16 (at peak)
- Floor area: 1,300,000 square feet (120,000 m^{2})
- Website: vaughanmills.com
- Building details
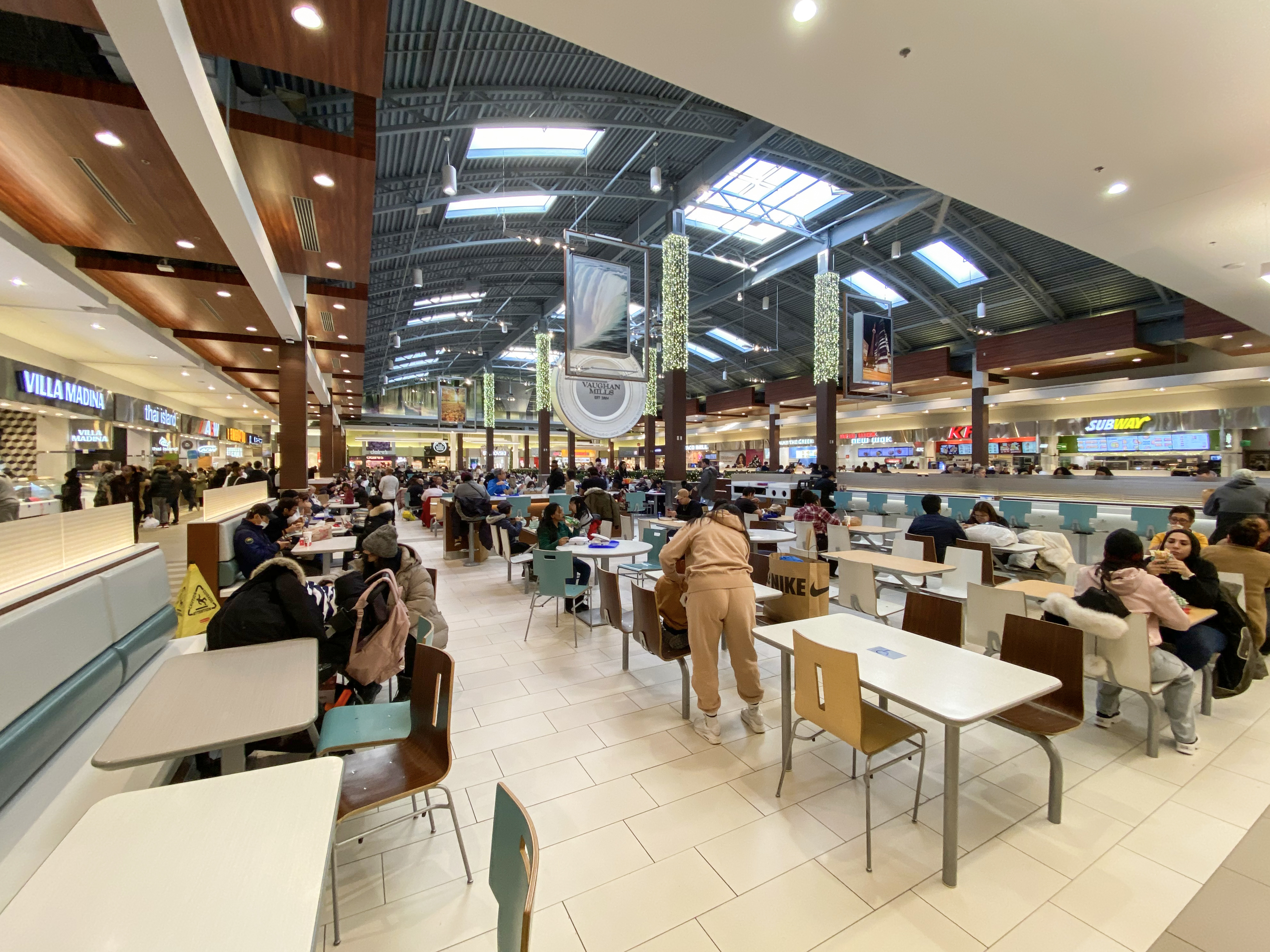
- Roadside Picnic food court after 2017 renovation

General information
- Status: Operational

Renovating team
- Architect: CMV Architects
- Renovating firm: Ivanhoé Cambridge

Vaughan Mills is a super-regional outlet centre located at the southeast quadrant of the Highway 400 and Rutherford Road interchange in Vaughan, Ontario, just south of Canada's Wonderland. It is one of the largest enclosed shopping centres in Canada, and the largest shopping mall in York Region with almost 1.3 million square feet (120,000 m^{2}) of retail space. The complex has over 200 retail stores, restaurants, and entertainment outlets.

The mall is served by York Region Transit bus routes at the Vaughan Mills Terminal, with frequent service to Vaughan Metropolitan Centre subway station, the northern terminus of Line 1 Yonge-University of the Toronto subway, 2 kilometres (1.2 mi) to the south along Jane Street. It is one of the only Landmark Mills malls that were not part of the Simon Property Group acquisition of The Mills Corporation in April 2007.

== History ==
=== 1997–2004: Development and opening ===
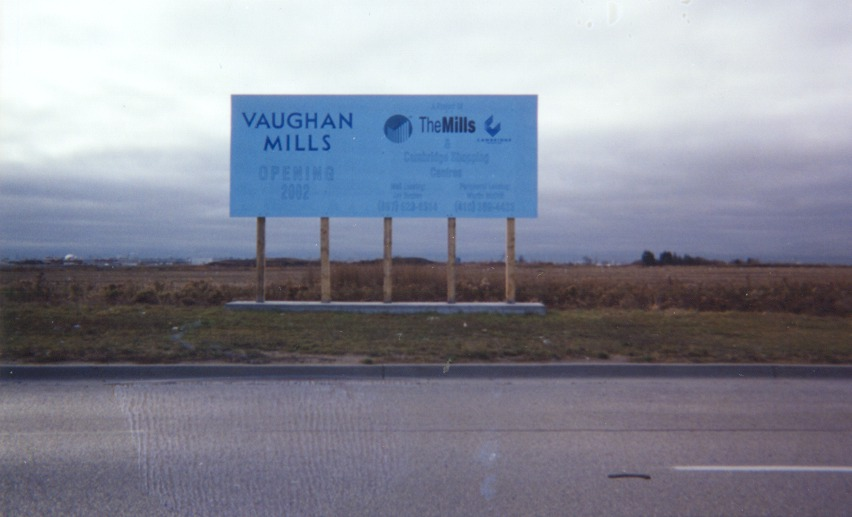
Mall site in October 2000

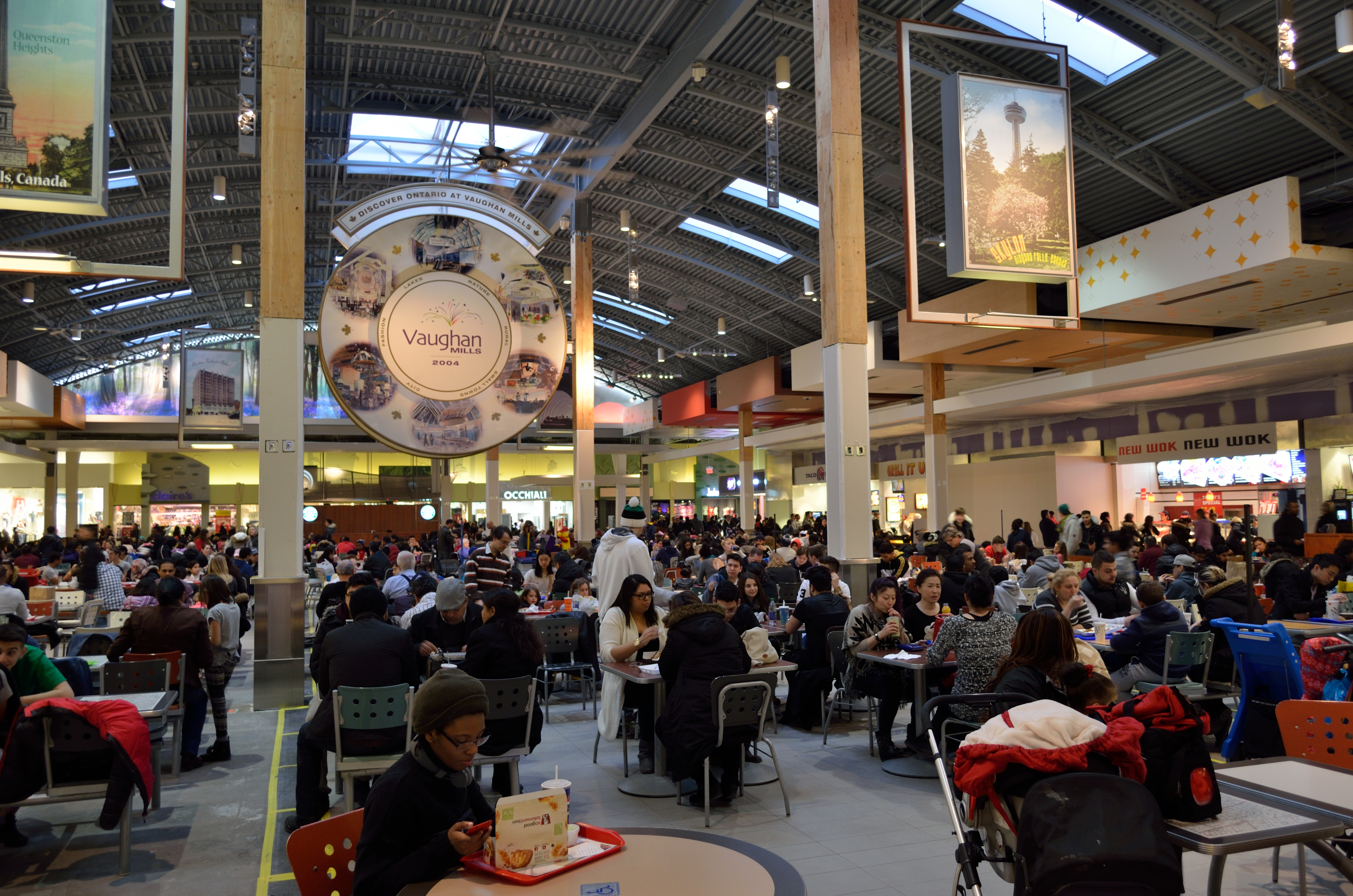
Food court before 2017 renovation (March 2015)

In the fall of 1997, Ivanhoé Cambridge, a subsidiary of Caisse de dépôt et placement du Québec, operating as Cambridge Shopping Centres Limited, and the Arlington, Virginia-based Mills Corporation formed a joint venture and filed planning applications with the City of Vaughan for a massive 1.7-million-square-foot (160,000 m^{2}) commercial development.

In February 1998, the developers secured a 180-acre (73 ha) site of former industrial land in the City of Vaughan, Ontario at the southeast corner of Ontario Highway 400 and Rutherford Road, approximately 20 miles north of downtown Toronto. Ivanhoé Cambridge and the Mills Corporation planned to develop what would become the first Landmark Mills mall outside of the United States, with the project being known as "Vaughan Mills". The mall would implement a "shoppertainment" mega-mall model, with retail outlets, a food court and entertainment. To allow the proposal, modifications were required to agree with the City of Vaughan Official Plan and Zoning By-law. The updates were approved by the city in the fall of 1998, and appealed to the Ontario Municipal Board by other commercial interests, surrounding landowners and ratepayer group.

On April 28, 1999, the companies that objected the proposal being Omers Realty Corporation, Cadillac Fairview Corporation, The Glen Group, Ontrea Inc., and Beutel Goodman Real Estate Group Inc. all announced to the Ontario Municipal Board that their criticisms would be withdrawn based on a settlement with the developers. On May 31, 1999, the project was approved by the Board. Construction was originally planned to begin the following year with a scheduled opening of October 2001.

When Vaughan Mills was conceived again in 1999, it was meant to be a slightly smaller complex at 1.4 million square feet (130,000 m^{2}), with up to 18 anchor retailers and a combined 245 stores and services. Construction of Vaughan Mills, however, began in June 2003, three years from when it was originally planned to start. The mall had its grand opening on November 4, 2004, and was the first regional enclosed shopping complex to be opened in the Greater Toronto Area (GTA) since the Erin Mills Town Centre in 1990 as well as the first in the GTA built in the 21st century. The mall had its two-millionth visitor less than two months after its opening.

==== Name ====
The mall was named following a trend by one of the real estate companies involved, The Mills Corporation, who named their Landmark mall developments ending in "Mills", hence "Vaughan Mills" was used for the mall name.

The local origins of the name "Vaughan Mills" can be traced back to the location of a saw mill built near a farm on the main branch of the Humber River on Lot 12, Concession 8 in the 1830s, up the river from Woodbridge. A grist mill was later added to the site. This area was known as "Vaughan Mills" in historical maps and was located around where the present-day Vaughan Mills Road crosses the Humber River in the west end of the city, a notable distance away from the today's shopping mall complex. The farm and surrounding lands were redeveloped into residential housing in the 1990s.

=== 2006–present ===
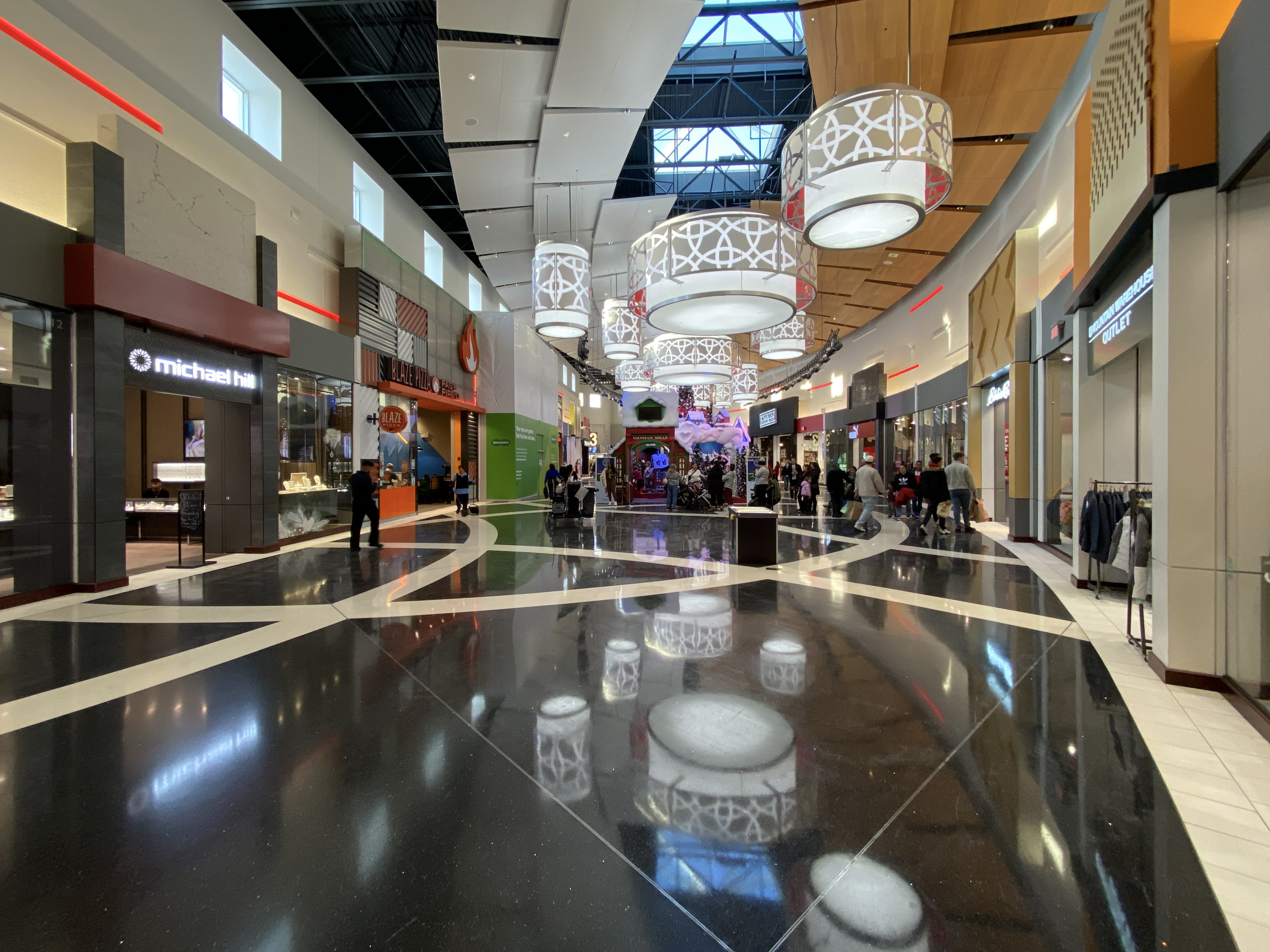
Expansion wing, which opened in October 2014 (viewed in 2022)

In August 2006, due to financial problems, The Mills Corporation announced that it would sell its stake in Vaughan Mills (and two other properties outside of Canada) back to its partner, Ivanhoé Cambridge, which would grant the latter full control of the property. Mills completed the sale of its interests in Vaughan Mills in November 2006.

StyleSense and NASCAR Speedpark were closed in early 2012. In January 2013, Ivanhoé Cambridge announced an $87 million expansion and redevelopment plan, which would add approximately 150,000 square feet (14,000 m^{2}) to the mall's footprint and 50 new stores. HR2 by Holt Renfrew opened at the shopping centre on May 10, 2013, replacing Holt Renfrew Last Call. It was the off-price division's second location in Canada.

The former StyleSense and NASCAR Speedpark facilities have been replaced by Calvin Klein and Legoland Discovery Centre Toronto, with the latter having its grand opening in March 2013 as the company's first store in Canada. The 50-store expansion wing of Vaughan Mills had its grand opening on October 23, 2014, including Puma, Nike Factory Store, Dr. Martens Outlet (the store's only outlet store in North America), and Brooks Brothers. It also introduced the Event Court, and the Sports Court, alongside WiFi connectivity and charging stations under a partnership with Cineplex Digital Studios.

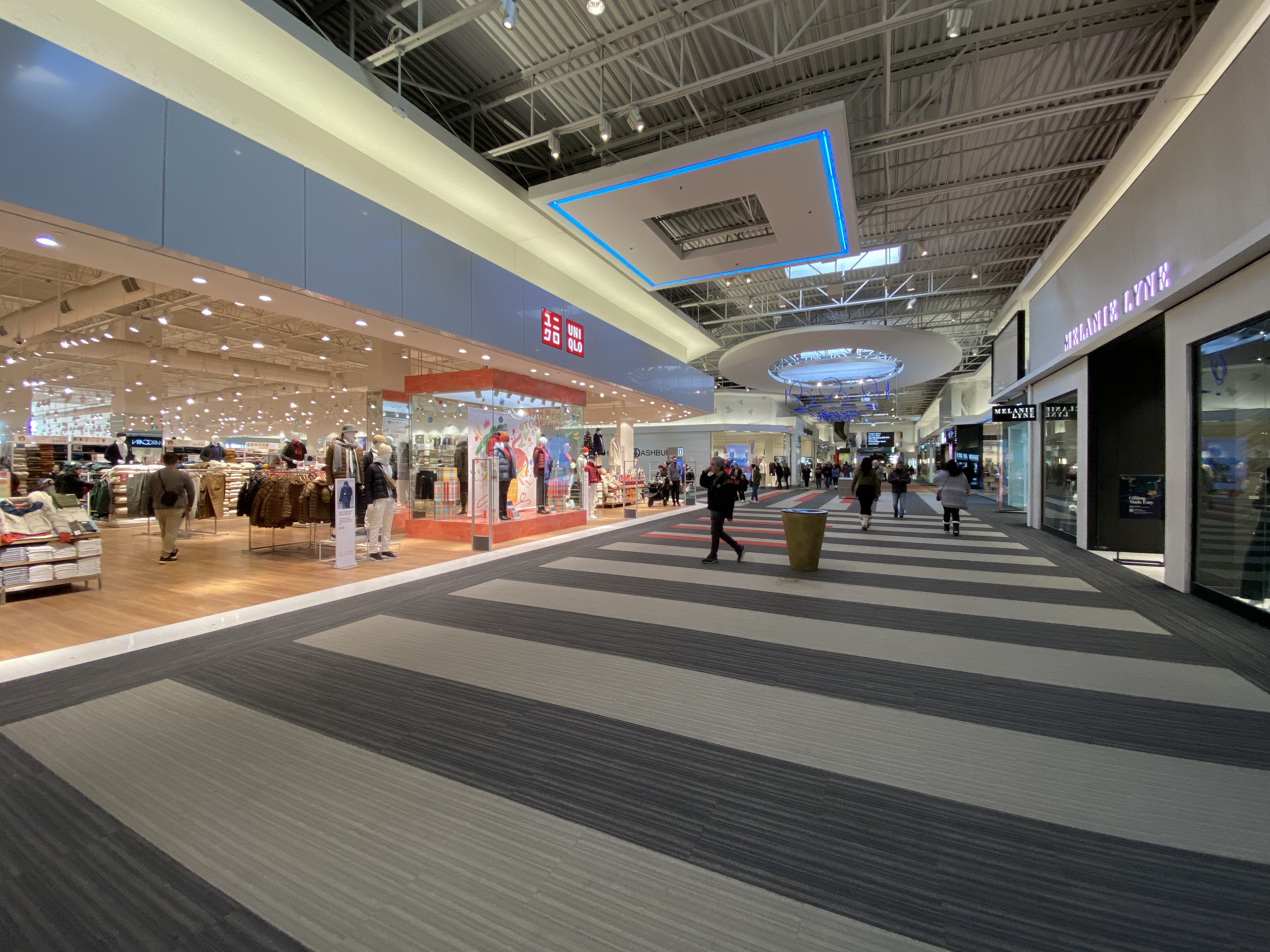
Uniqlo wing in 2022

On March 17, 2016, Saks Off 5th opened a 32,000-square-foot (3,000 m^{2}) store in the mall. In 2017, the mall's food court was renovated to minimize customer disruptions. The remodel was designed by CMV Architects. In February 2017, HR2 stated two of its locations, including Vaughan Mills, would close in mid-2017 as Holt Renfrew wanted to focus on its main stores. Nordstrom Rack opened in March 2018. It was the only Nordstrom-branded store in the York Region. In June 2018, Japanese retailer Uniqlo announced an expansion to open four new locations in malls, including Vaughan Mills, which would open on September 28, 2018, taking over the vacant HR2 space.

In January 2020, it was announced that Gymboree would return to Vaughan Mills. The shopping centre reopened on June 19, 2020 after temporarily closing to the public due to the COVID-19 pandemic. In May 2023, Nordstrom Rack permanently closed its doors, as Nordstrom Canada went out of business.

In December 2023, Ivanhoé Cambridge sold a 49% stake in the mall to LaSalle Investment Management, a subsidiary of JLL Properties, which took over management and leasing. On October 28, 2025, the American fast food restaurant Shake Shack opened in the food court. In late January 2026, the popular American restaurant chain Olive Garden announced that it would open in the former Pickle Barrel space at Vaughan Mills in the summer. Toys "R" Us closed due to a restructuring and insolvency problem.

== Gallery ==
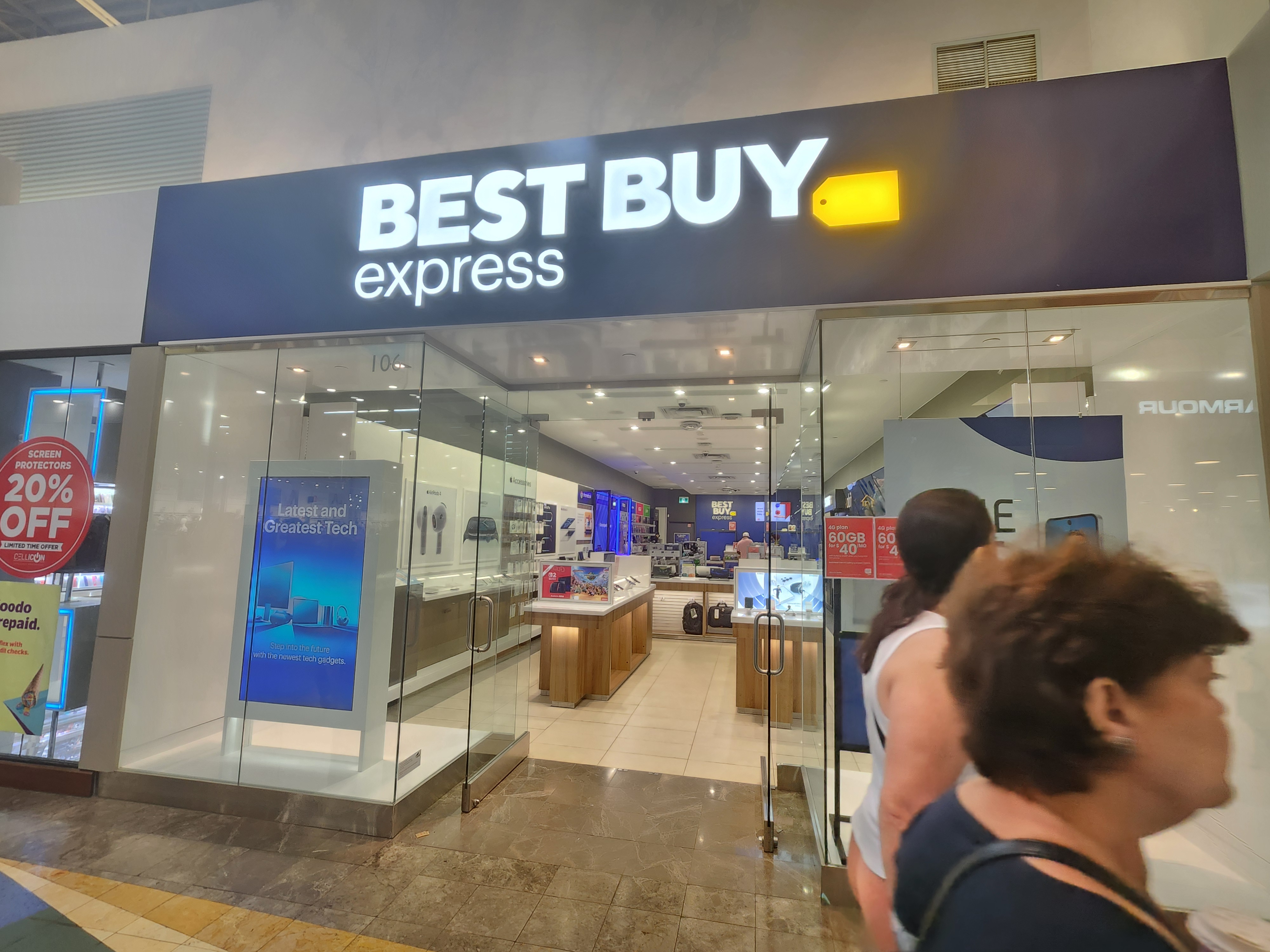
Best Buy Express (July 2025)

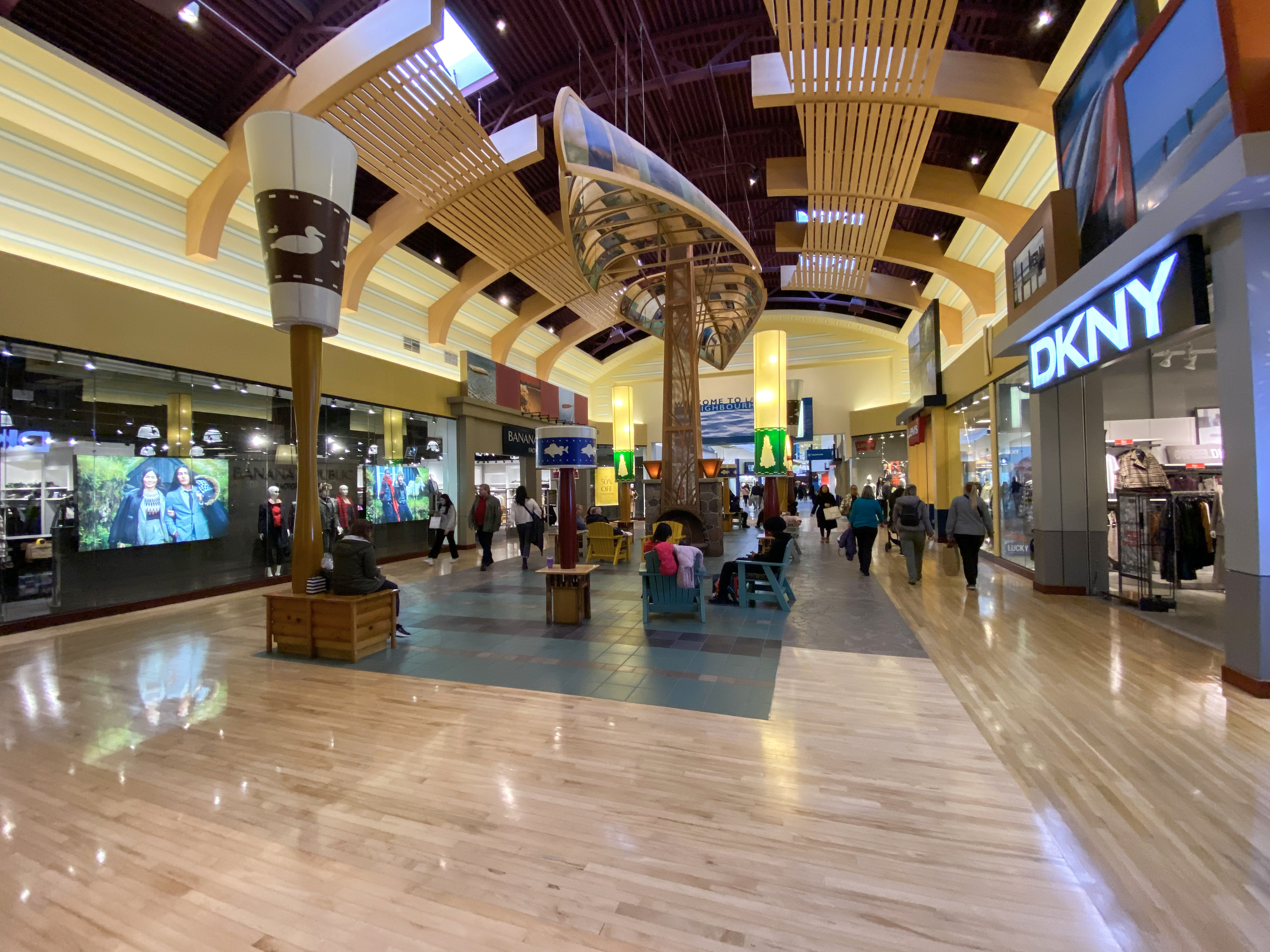
Neighbourhood 1 seating area (2022)

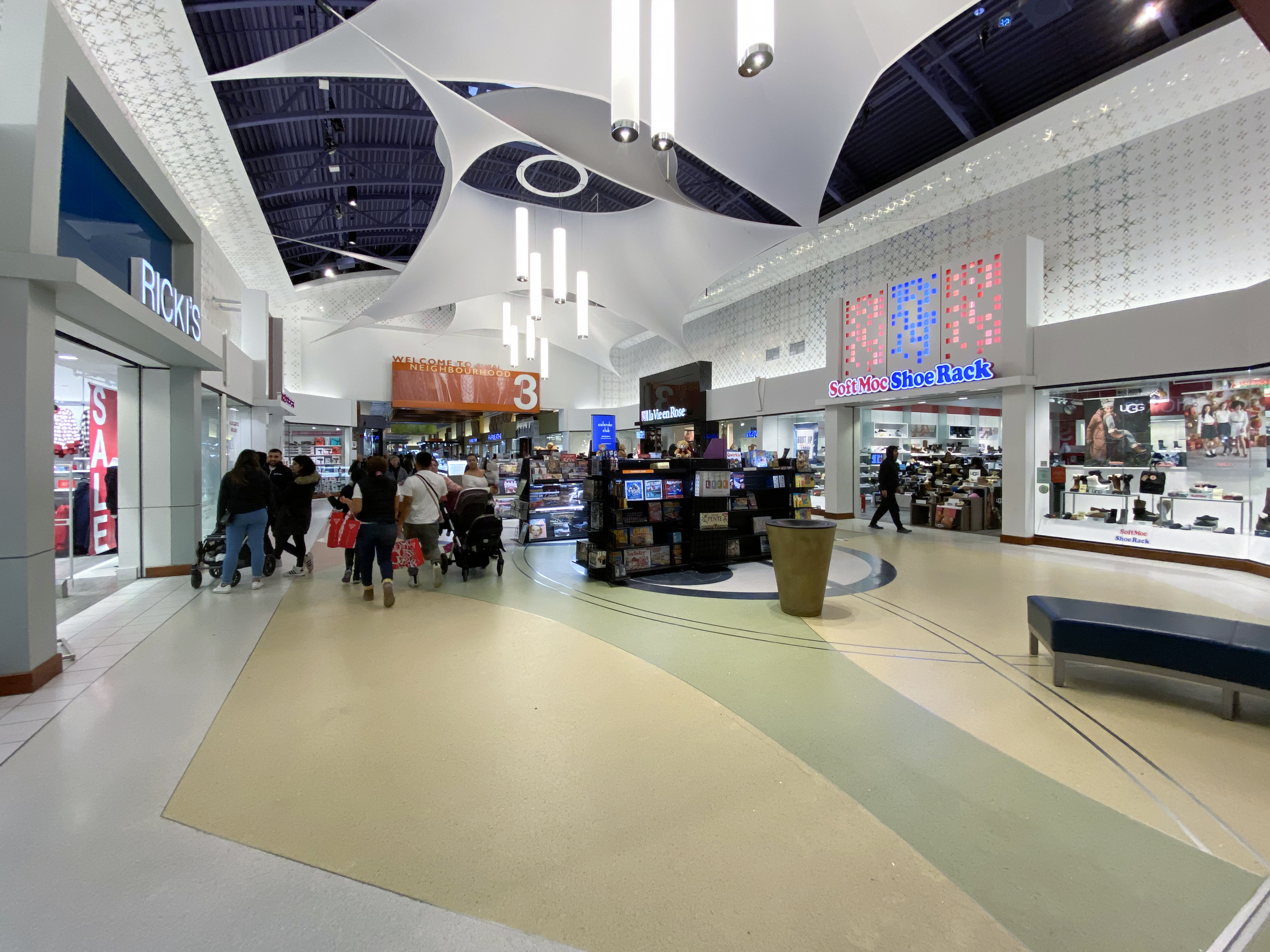
Neighbourhood 2 seating area (2022)

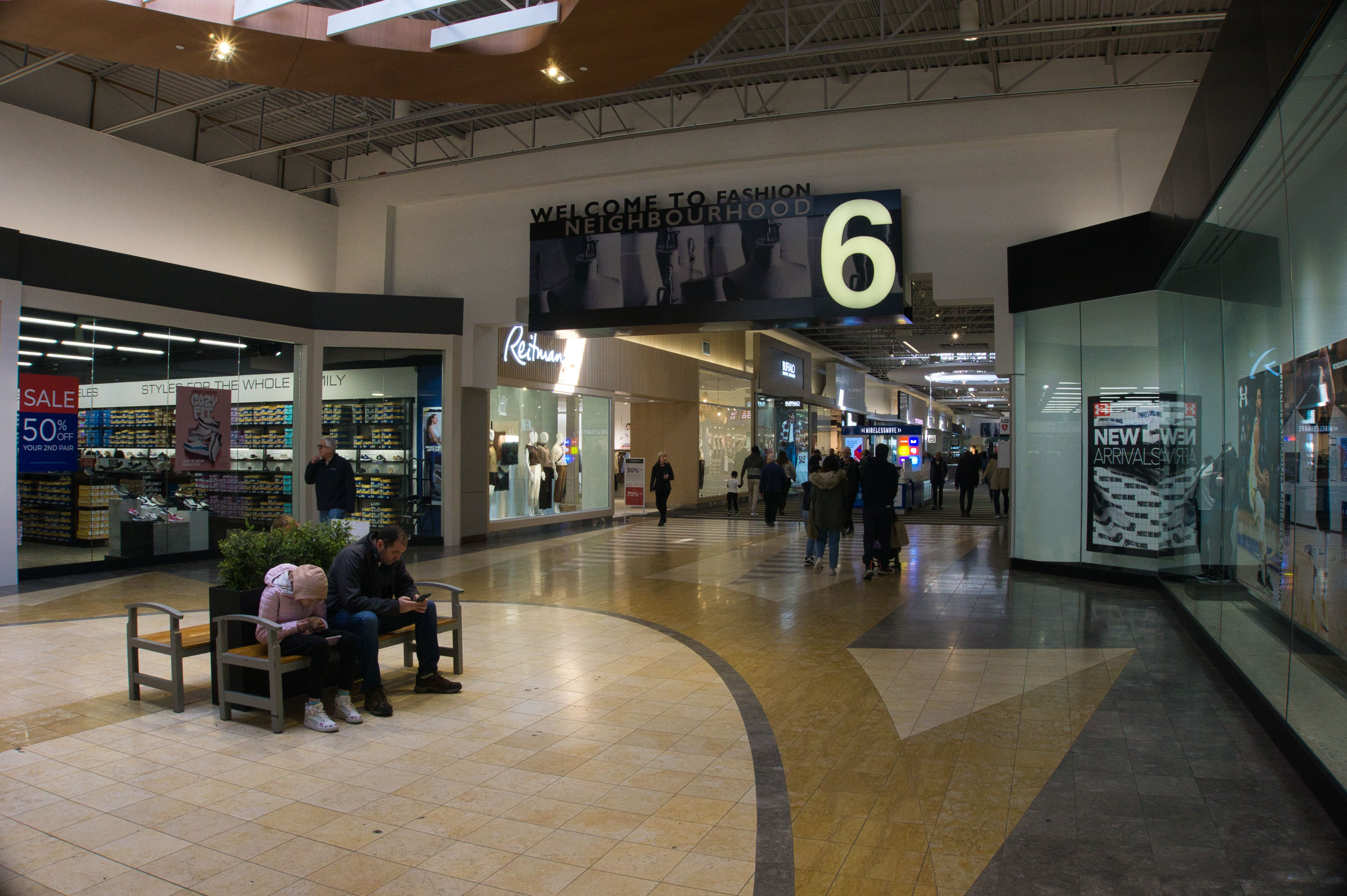
Fashion Neighbourhood 6 Entrance - March 2026

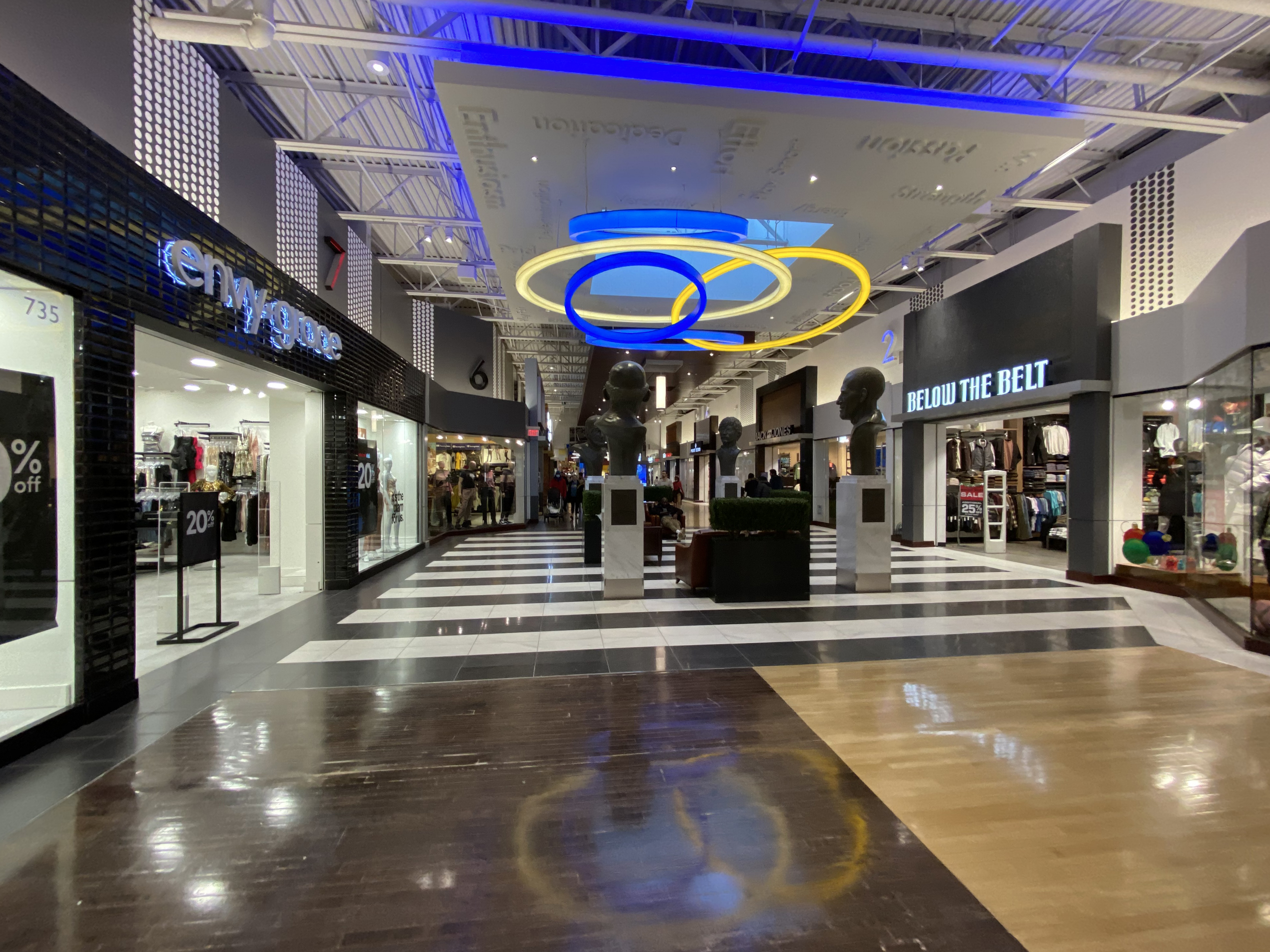
Neighbourhood 3 concourse (2022)

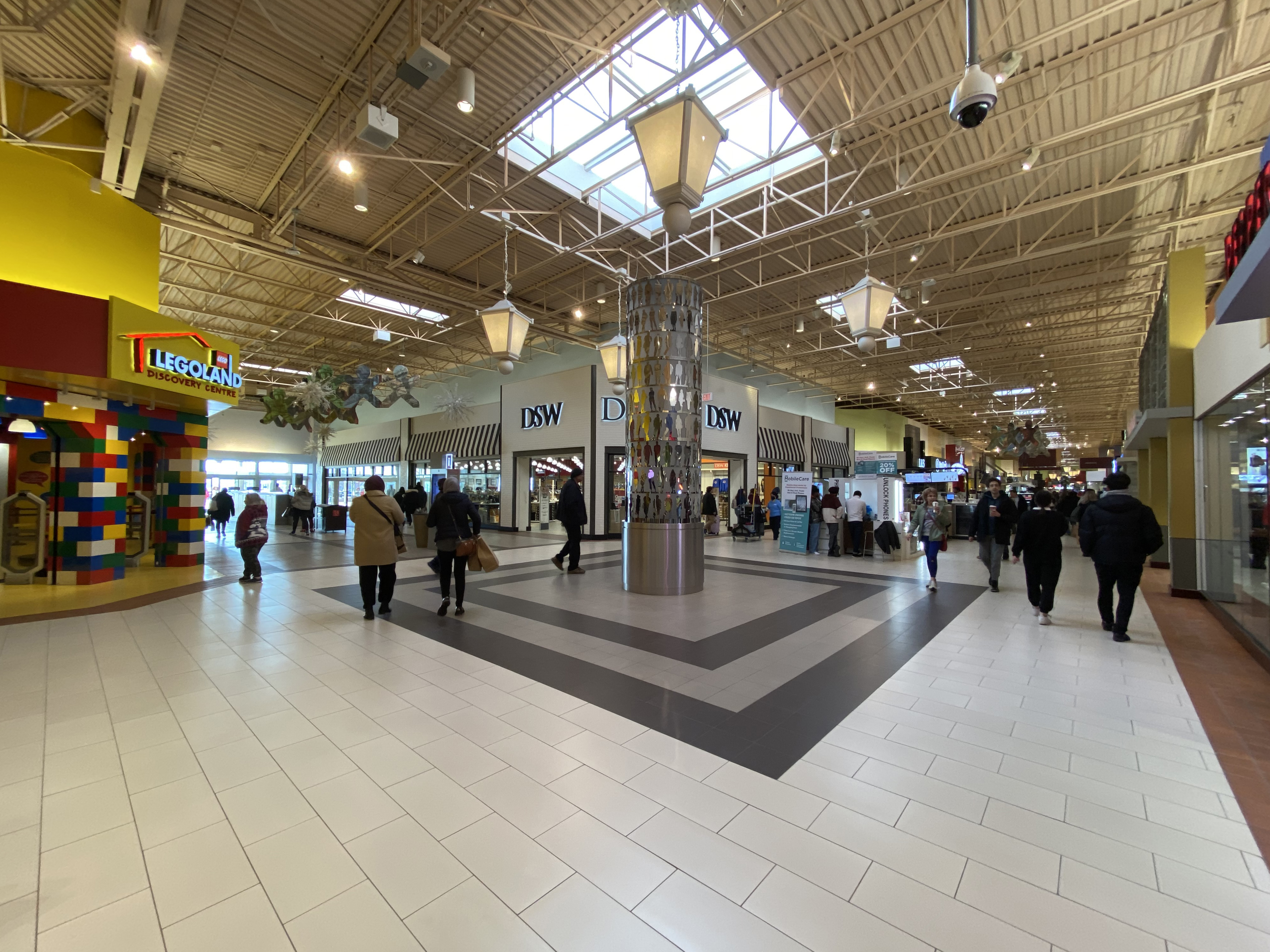
Shops in Neighbourhood 4, with Legoland Discovery Centre Toronto in the background (2022)

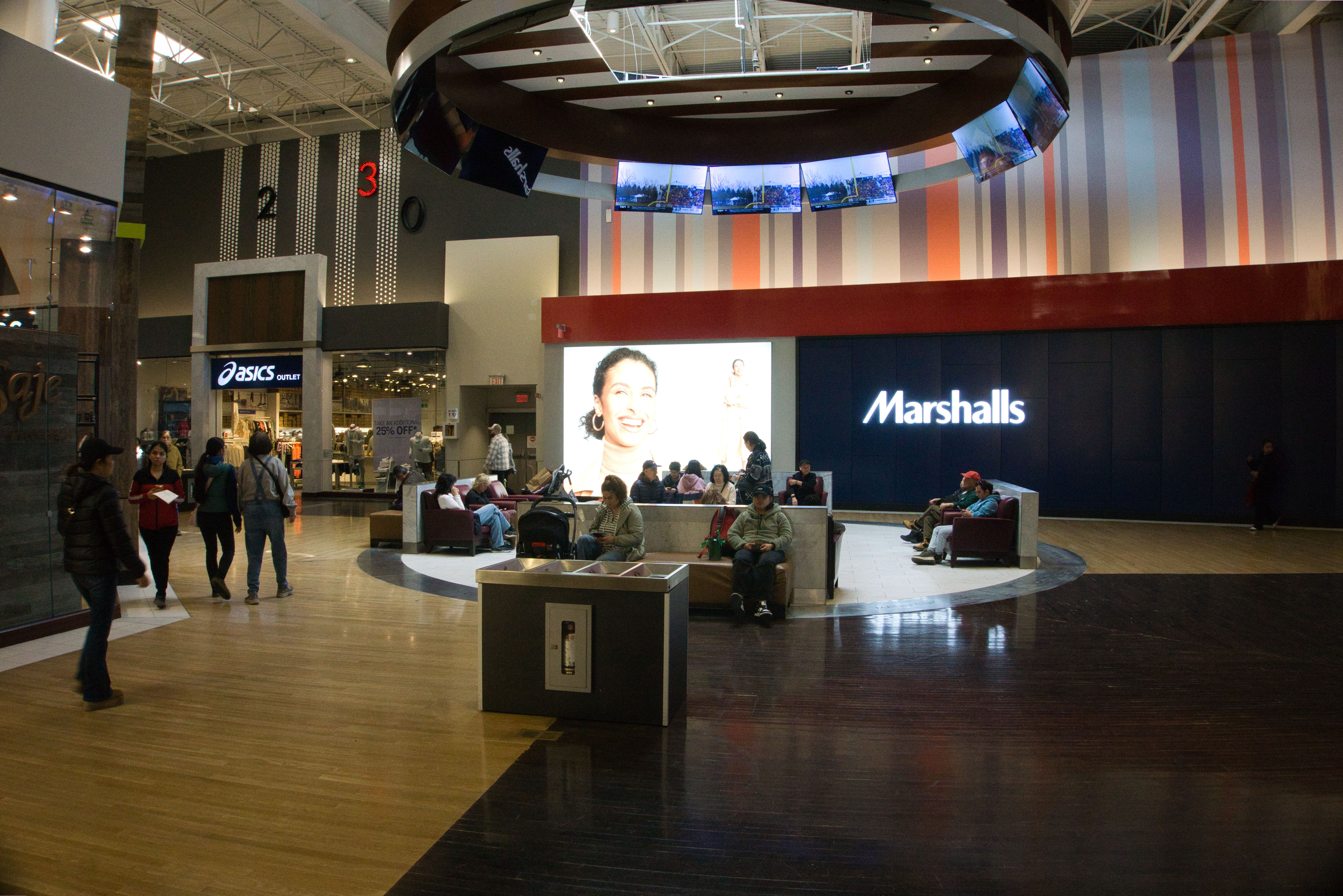
Marshalls store and seating area (March 2026)

== Public transit ==
Vaughan Mills Terminal
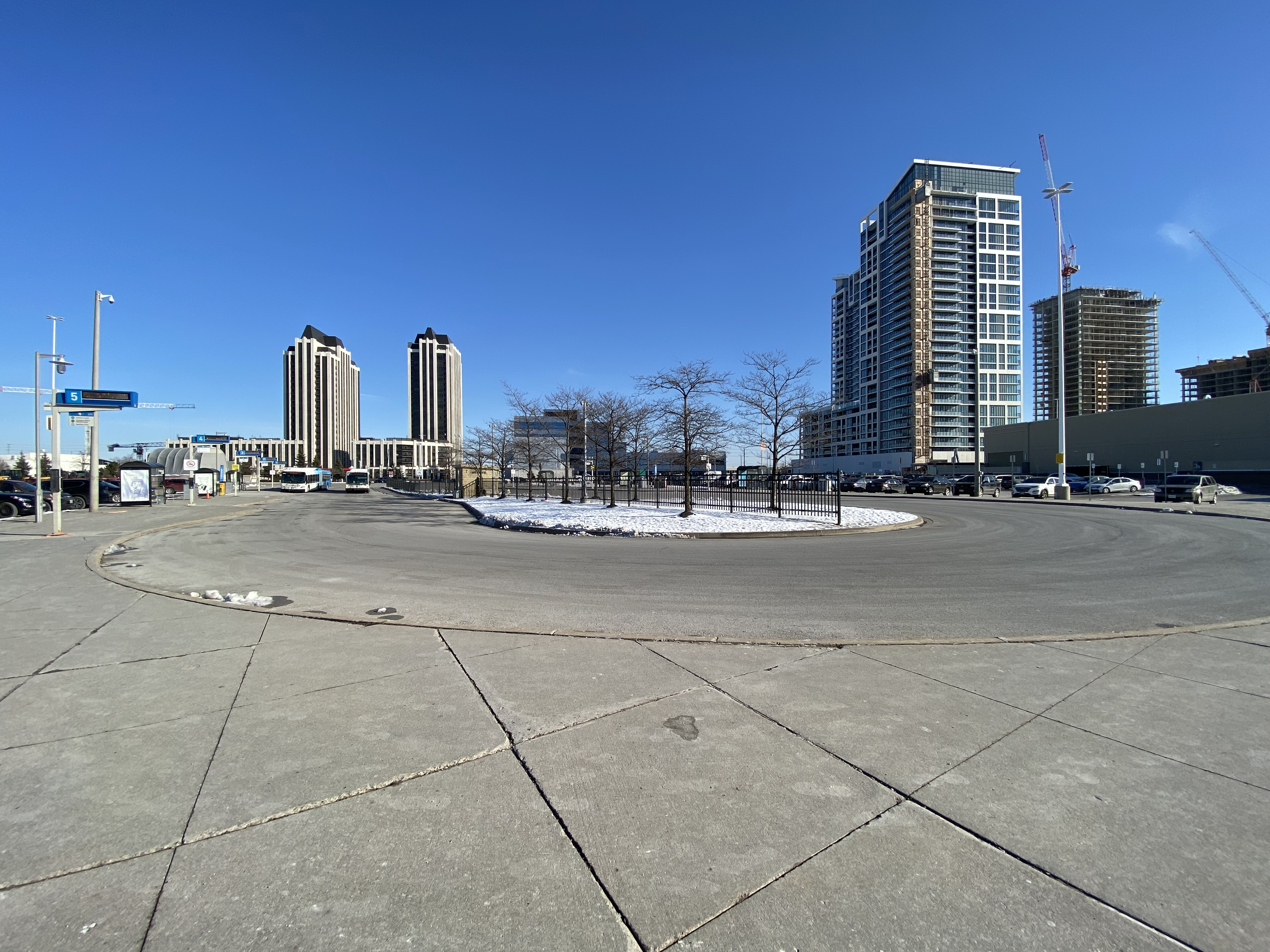
- In December 2022

General information
- Location: 1 Bass Pro Mills Drive
- Owner: Regional Municipality of York
- Operator: York Region Transit
- Bus stands: 8
- Bus operators: York Region Transit

History
- Opened: November 4, 2004
Location

The Vaughan Mills Terminal is a York Region Transit (YRT) transit terminal located at 1 Bass Pro Mills Drive, near the northeast corridor of Vaughan Mills near the intersection of Rutherford Road and Jane Street. The terminal has oneRide ticket machines. Only YRT routes connect to this terminal.

== Sister malls in Canada ==
Ivanhoé Cambridge had plans to develop similar Landmark Mills malls in Canada. They stated that the August 2006 exit of the Mills Corporation would not affect this.

The developer had plans for four Mills shopping centres in Canada, which would be in Toronto (Vaughan Mills), Calgary, Vancouver, and Montreal. As of October 2016, only three of them have been developed.

=== CrossIron Mills ===
CrossIron Mills, located outside of Calgary, Alberta, opened on August 19, 2009. It has a number of the same retailers as the Vaughan Mills Mall, including Bass Pro Shops. The CrossIron Mills location opened in the spring of 2009, several months ahead of the main mall. The construction, leasing, and opening of the mall has paralleled Vaughan Mills to a degree, as it, too, has occurred during an economic recession.

=== Tsawwassen Mills ===
Tsawwassen Mills, located in Delta, British Columbia, at Highway 17 and 52nd Street on Tsawwassen First Nation Lands south of Vancouver. Construction began in January 2014, and the mall opened on October 5, 2016. Tsawwassen Mills is designed in a similar format to its sister malls and includes approximately 111,500 square metres (1,200,000 sq ft) of retail. Plans called for 16 anchor retailers, including the first Bass Pro Shops Outdoor World location in British Columbia announced as the first anchor tenant. Unlike Vaughan and CrossIron Mills, this shopping centre was sold to the Chinese-based firm Central Walk in May 2022.

=== Laval Mills ===
Ivanhoé Cambridge had originally planned to build what would have been called Laval Mills in Laval, Quebec near Montreal. However, the project was abandoned in May 2011. Reasons for the cancellation are unclear.

== See also ==
- Concord Mills, which also has six neighbourhoods
