= Ruby Liu =

Chinese property investment manager

Liu Weihong
- Simplified Chinese: 刘伟宏
- Traditional Chinese: 劉偉宏
Transcriptions
Standard Mandarin
- Hanyu Pinyin: Liú Wèihóng
- Wade–Giles: Liu Wei-hung

Liu Weihong, also known as Ruby Liu, is a Chinese property investment manager and owner of three shopping malls and a golf course in British Columbia, Canada. As of June 2025, she was in the process of acquiring the leases for 28 permanently closed Hudson's Bay Company stores in order to set up her own department store chain.

Liu moved to Canada from China in 2014. Liu became a permanent resident of Canada in 2017. She was reported in 2025 to be a billionaire.

== Company ==
Ruby Liu Commercial Investment Corporation (RLCIC), a company based in Richmond, British Columbia according to official paperwork, has a subsidiary called Central Walk, a real estate investment firm based in Nanaimo. As of 2025, Ruby Liu was the chairwoman of Central Walk; Linda Qin was its chief executive officer.

As of May 2025, Liu owned three shopping malls as well as Arbutus Ridge Golf Course. According to its website, Central Walk also owned a number of assets in Southeast Asia.

== Shopping centres ==
Central Walk has three shopping centres all in British Columbia.

Shopping centres owned by Central Walk
Centre	Location	Year acquired	Property value	Square footage
Mayfair Shopping Centre	Victoria	2021	$242.57 million	518,748
Tsawwassen Mills	Delta	2022	$407 million	1.2 million
Woodgrove Centre	Nanaimo	2020	$230 million	775,000

In 2019, Liu sold the Central Walk Shopping Mall in Shenzhen to Hong Kong's Link Real Estate Investment Trust for more than $1 billion.

Liu had paid $858 million for all three of her British Columbia shopping centres, which she had purchased from Ivanhoé Cambridge Inc., a division of Caisse de dépôt et placement du Québec. In April 2025, Central Walk listed Woodgrove Centre, Vancouver Island's largest shopping mall, for sale.

== Department stores ==
In early 2025, the Hudson's Bay Company announced it would be permanently closing all its department stores across Canada, liquidating their contents and auctioning off their commercial leases at various shopping malls. At the end of April 2025, Ruby Liu placed to bid, along with a deposit, for the leases of 28 HBC stores located in British Columbia, Alberta, and Ontario in order to launch a new department store chain in these locations. The bid included at least one former Saks Off 5th store owned by HBC.

Liu would use her name, Ruby Liu, to brand her stores, along with a ruby-shaped graphic. She would offer apparel, jewelry and makeup, and provide entertainment and dining facilities, areas for cosplay and children's play spaces, if permitted by the purchased store lease agreement. She hoped to have 20 of the stores operating within 180 days of acquiring the leases. She estimates she would need 2,500 to 3,000 employees to open, and was in contact with former Bay employees including store managers.

By 23 May 2025, Liu became the successful bidder for 28 Hudson's Bay store leases, pending either landlord or court approval. However, landlords for 23 of the leases objected to the Liu bids as they felt Liu had an insufficient business plan, insufficient financing for store maintenance and a lack of experience in retail store operations as opposed to shopping centre management. On 23 June, the court approved Liu's acquisition of 3 leases where Liu's company was the landlord. By 26 June, Liu took possession of one of the smallest stores she made a bid on, a former Saks Off 5th store at Tsawwassen Mills. On 24 October, the court sided with landlords and rejected Liu's bid to acquire the 23 disputed store leases.
