= Woodbine Avenue =

Road in Ontario, Canada

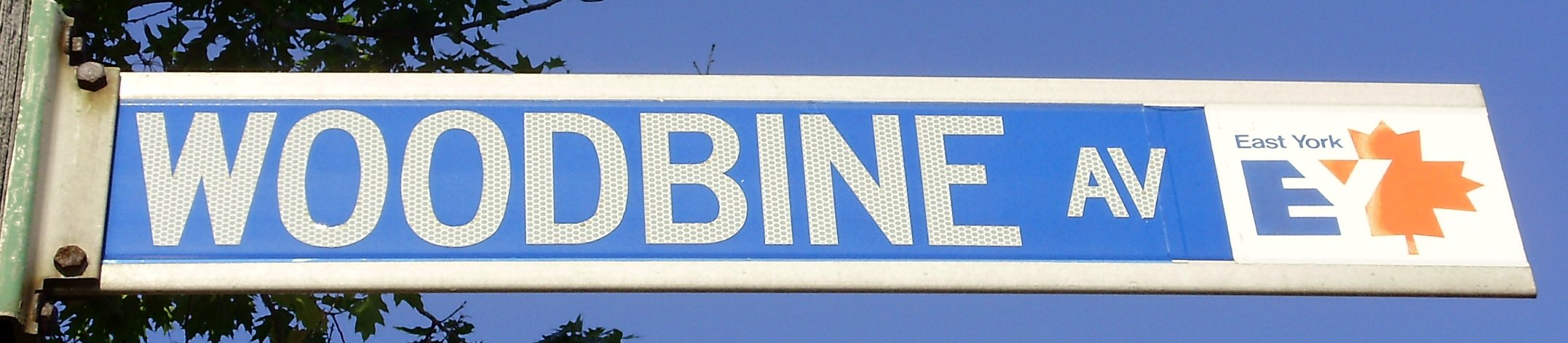
- York Regional Road 8
- Woodbine Avenue at Burgess Avenue

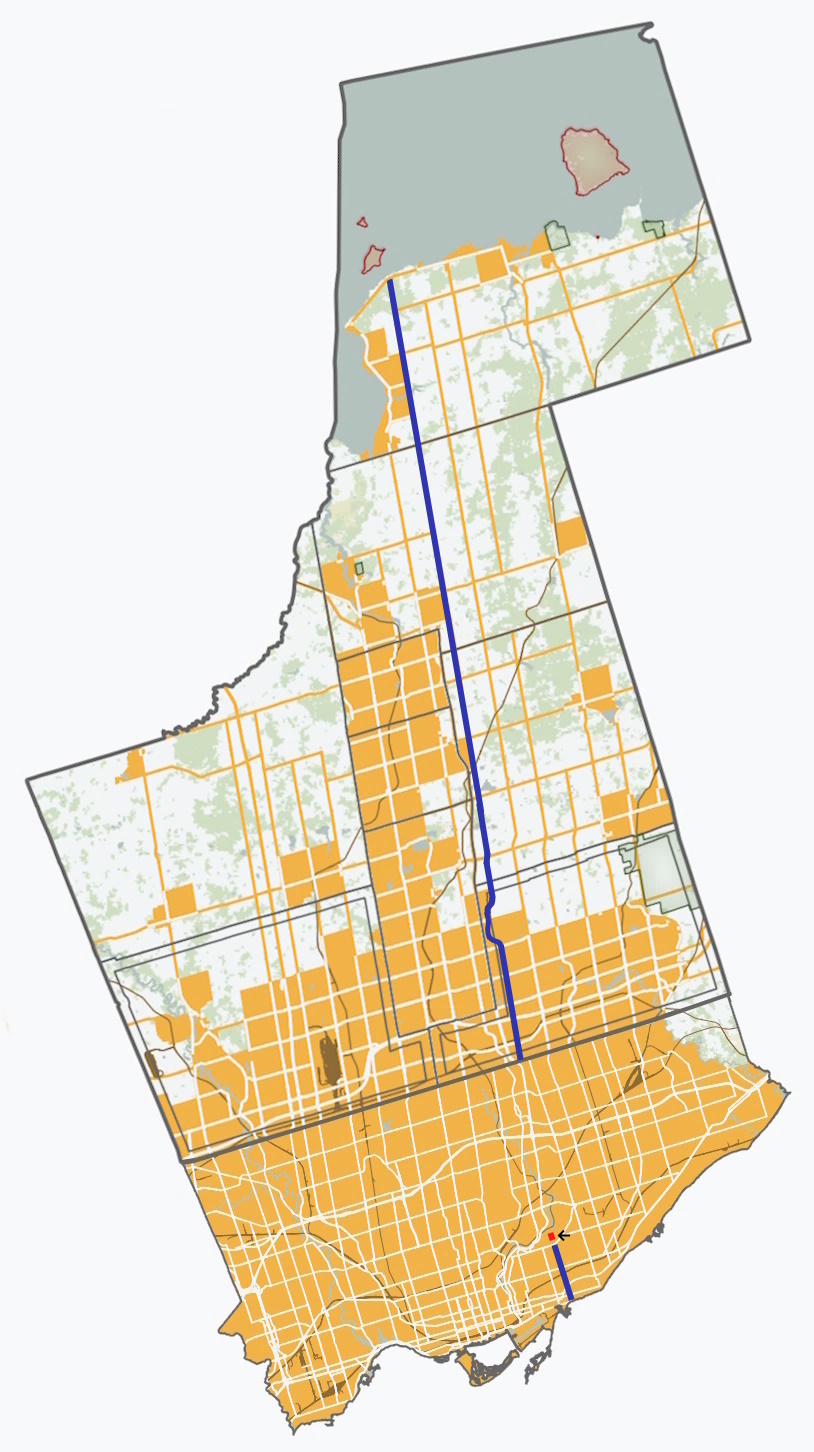
- Route of Woodbine Avenue through Toronto and York Region (blue line); Former section; now Woodbine Heights Blvd. (red dash)
- Namesake: Woodbine Racetrack (original)
- Maintained by: City of Toronto (Toronto Transportation); York Region
- Length: 59.3 km (36.8 mi) (two sections: 3.9 km (2.4 mi) in Toronto and 55.4 km (34.4 mi) in York Region)
- South end: Lake Shore Boulevard (continues west as Lake Shore)
- Major junctions: Queen Street; Kingston Road; Gerrard Street; Danforth Avenue; O'Connor Drive —Road Breaks— Steeles Avenue / Highway 404; John Street / Esna Park Drive; Highway 407; Highway 7; 16th Avenue; Major Mackenzie Drive; Elgin Mills Road; Stouffville Road; Davis Drive; Highway 404; Ravenshoe Road; Morton Avenue / Pullock Road; Metro Road
- North end: Lake Drive at Lake Simcoe in Georgina

Woodbine Avenue is a north–south arterial road consisting of two sections in Toronto and York Region in Ontario, Canada.

== Route description ==
The southern section in Toronto runs just under 4 kilometres (2.5 mi), and begins near Ashbridge's Bay on the shore of Lake Ontario, at Lake Shore Boulevard, which ends by curving north to default into Woodbine. This section of Woodbine then continues north and ends at O'Connor Drive.

The northern section runs from Steeles Avenue at the Toronto-Markham border and extends 55.4 kilometres (34.4 mi) to the shore of Lake Simcoe, ending at Lake Drive in Georgina. York Region designates this section as York Regional Road 8. Woodbine Avenue runs parallel to Highway 404, with the highway's northern terminus branching off it just south of Ravenshoe Road in East Gwillimbury. Woodbine in York Region is six lanes wide from Steeles Avenue to Highway 7, and four lanes wide from Highway 7 to north of Elgin Mills Road, passing through the Markham neighbourhoods of Buttonville, Cachet, and Cathedraltown, with a bypass around the preserved former rural community of Victoria Square. North of Elgin Mills, Woodbine narrows to a two-lane rural road.

There is also a short former third section immediately to the north of the Toronto section; cut off by the Taylor-Massey Creek, in the Parkview Hills neighbourhood, which is today named Woodbine Heights Boulevard. It runs for four blocks and ends at the East Don Valley of the Don River.

Union Street in Gormley is a former alignment of Woodbine at Stouffville Road.

== History ==
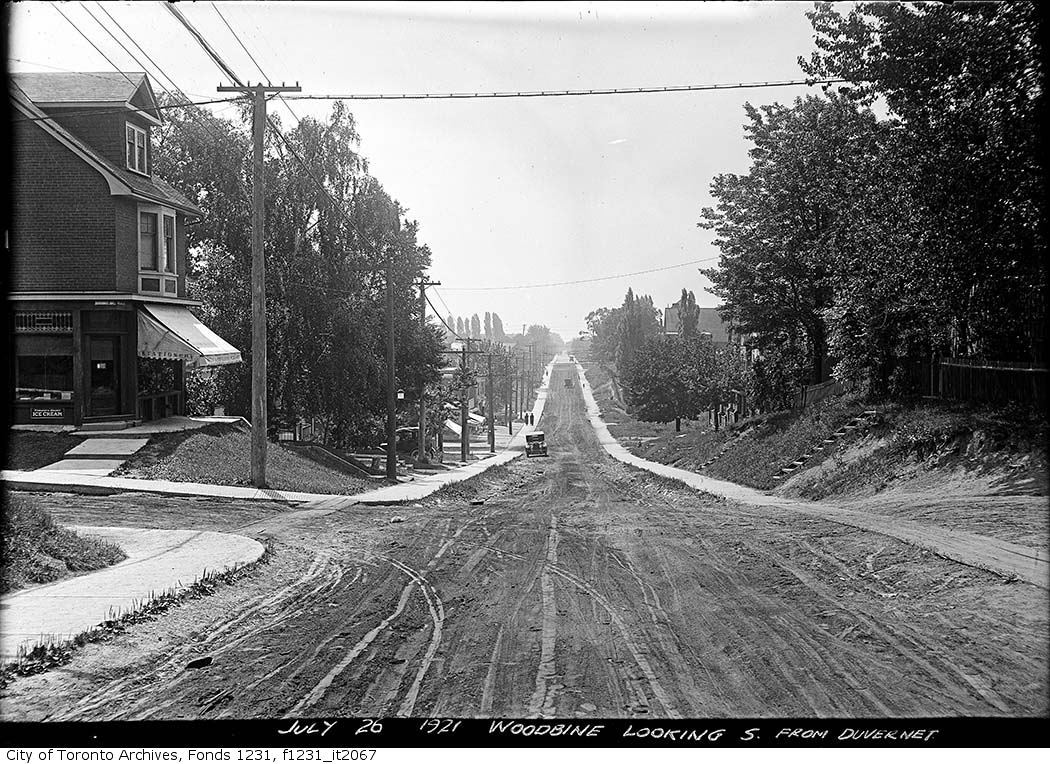
Woodbine Ave. looking south from Duvernet Ave. in 1921

Woodbine was a single lane paved concession road (third concession line laid 19,800 ft (6,000 m) east of Yonge Street, with the northern section running to south of York Mills Road with an unopened road allowance extending southwards to beyond Lawrence Avenue. An abandoned stub of the old road south of York Mills Road remains behind a fenced off wooded area on the east side of the Don Valley Parkway where the parkway crosses a ravine.

It was named for Woodbine Racetrack, later known as Greenwood Raceway. Beyond Lawrence Avenue and especially south of Eglinton Avenue the road allowance was not feasible for a roadway due to the deep valley along the Don River. It is also believed that former racetrack-owner William J. (Jiggs) Howell (along with either Raymond Pardee or Dennis Pard) operated a tavern at then 88 Yonge Street (west side of Yonge north of King Street near the Fairweather Building c. 1918) called "The Woodbine House" or "The Woodbine", which was re-used by Howell for his horse track.

Facing south along Woodbine Ave. towards the Finch Ave. intersection in 1965, prior to it being displaced by the construction of Highway 404

Originally, Woodbine Avenue's southern terminus was at the namesake Woodbine Beach on Ashbridge's Bay just south of Kew Beach Avenue which is two blocks south of Queen Street, but was rechannelled to curve west into the eastern end of the then-new Lake Shore Boulevard in the 1950s.

In Toronto, portions of unopened and open road allowances for Woodbine Avenue north of Eglinton Avenue to Sheppard Avenue were removed when the Don Valley Parkway was constructed in the 1960s, with the terminus of Don Valley Parkway defaulting to Woodbine Avenue. The last section of Woodbine in Metropolitan Toronto between Sheppard Avenue and Steeles Avenue was lost when the provincial extension of the Don Valley Parkway, Highway 404, was built over it during the 1970s. Woodbine was retained north of Steeles through York Region by swinging the route of Highway 404 to the west, with the Parclo A4 interchange with Steeles including a Y-junction to accommodate traffic to and from Woodbine towards the south. Victoria Park Avenue, a major north–south arterial extending north from the City of Toronto, terminates shortly after the intersection with Steeles, with Woodbine absorbing most of this traffic.

Before 1964 the Markham section was referred to as Don Mills Road (Concession Road 4), but renamed to avoid confusion with the road south of Steeles and further west also called Don Mills Road.

Woodbine Avenue in Buttonville, Markham

In the early 2000s, new housing development necessitated the widening of Woodbine Avenue north of Major Mackenzie Drive to cope with increased traffic levels. However, due to residences and heritage properties in the community of Victoria Square, including a church and a cemetery, a new four-lane section of Woodbine was constructed on a new alignment which included a new intersection with Elgin Mills Road. The new alignment, which was initially known as Woodbine Avenue By-Pass, opened on November 15, 2010. The bypassed section of Woodbine Avenue was renamed Victoria Square Boulevard to reflect the location of the road within the area of Victoria Square and transferred to the jurisdiction of the city of Markham. However, the bypass retained the Woodbine Avenue By-Pass name even after the renaming of the bypassed segment until November 2015, when it was finally decided to redesignate it as part of Woodbine Avenue proper. The former alignment, Victoria Square Boulevard, intersects Woodbine at both ends.

In 2017, the City of Toronto installed Cycle Tracks (protected bike lanes) to Woodbine Ave spanning from O'Connor Dr to Queen St E.

== Public Transit ==
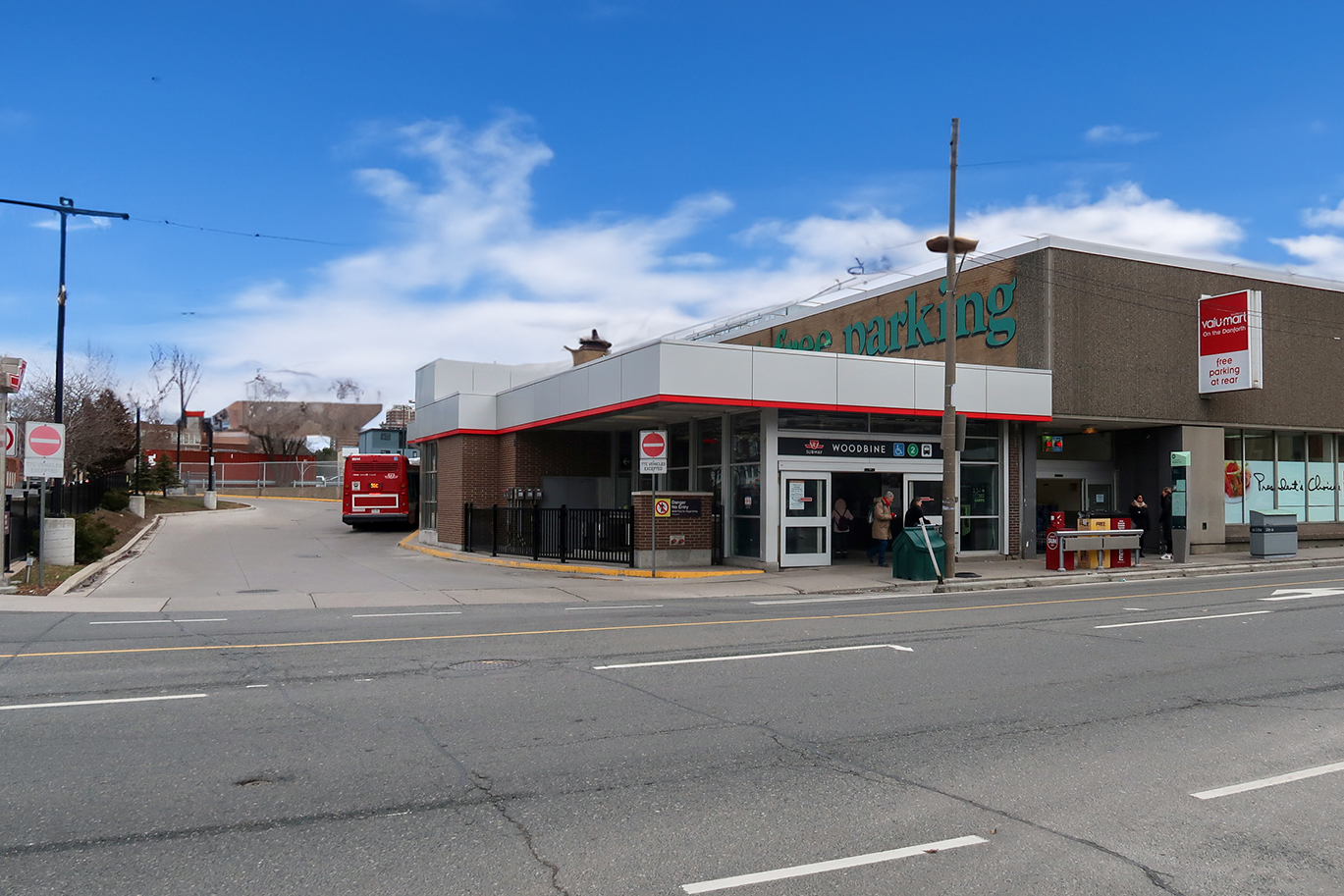
Woodbine Avenue at Woodbine subway station

Transit service along Woodbine began in 1921 by Hollinger Bus Lines. The Woodbine route ran from Danforth north to O'Connor Drive. Before then residents along the road was assumed would not likely be travelling south or could walk to their destination. Woodbine intersected with a few east–west streetcar lines:

- Queen - began service in 1880 by Toronto Street Railway (TSR), transferred to Toronto Railway Company (TRC) in 1891 and taken over by the TTC in 1921
- King - began service in 1888 by the TSR, transferred to TRC in 1891 and taken over by the TTC in 1921; route ran on Queen when it reached Woodbine and now numbered as 504
- Lee (Avenue) - operated by the TSR 1889–1891, transferred to the TRC in 1891 and merged into King route in 1893; route ran on Queen when it reached Woodbine
- Woodbine - operated by the TSR 1887 to 1891, transferred to the TRC 1891 and merged with King route in 1893; route ran on Queen when it reached Woodbine
- Gerrard - began service in 1912 by the city owned Toronto Civic Railways (TCR) and taken over by the TTC in 1921; now numbered as 506
- Danforth - began service in 1913 by the TCR and transferred to the TTC in 1921; merged with Bloor route in 1923 and replaced by Bloor Danforth subway line in 1966

The privately operated Hollinger route was taken over by the TTC in 1954 and retained route name. The opening of Woodbine subway station in 1966 changed transit patterns, as many residents now needed to get all the way north to Danforth.

Today Woodbine is served by five different routes and two operators. The northern part of the route, from Danforth to O'Connor is served by the TTC 91 Woodbine and 93 Parkview Hills bus routes. South of Danforth is served by TTC 92 Woodbine South bus route.

In Markham the road is served by the 24 Woodbine YRT route. The far north of the road, through the town of Keswick is served by YRT 51 Keswick Local.

== Neighbourhoods and communities ==
Woodbine serves a number of neighbourhoods and rural communities in Toronto and York Region:

- The Beaches
- Woodbine Heights
- Parkview Hills
- Buttonville
- Cachet
- Cathedraltown
- Victoria Square (now bypassed)
- Gormley
- Preston Lake
- Vandorf
- Wesley Corners
- Pleasantville
- Queensville
- Maple Hill
- Keswick
- Island Grove

== Landmarks ==
Landmarks and notable sites along Woodbine from south to north:

=== Southern section ===
Landmark	Cross street	Notes	Image
Woodbine Beach	Lake Ontario	Part of The Beaches Park (established after the sale of Ashbridge Estate in the 1920s) and is maintained by Toronto Parks, Forestry and Recreation Division	
Greenwood Raceway	Lake Shore Blvd	Racetrack (1874–1994) demolished in the late 1990s and now home to residential development	
St. John's Cemetery Norway	Kingston Road	Church opened 1853	
St. John the Baptist, Norway Anglican Church	Kingston Road	Opened 1853 along with St. John's Cemetery Norway	
Woodbine subway station	Danforth Avenue	Station on Bloor–Danforth line opened 1966	
Toronto Chinese Mennonite Church	North of Danforth Avenue	Formerly Rogers Memorial Presbyterian 1922–2000	

=== Northern section ===
Landmark	Cross street	Notes	Image
Cathedral of the Transfiguration	Major Mackenzie Drive East		
Fletcher's Fields	19th Avenue	Rugby Stadium/Field and home to Toronto Rebellion of the Rugby Canada Super League	
Preston Lake	Bloomington Road East	Village settled in 1802 next to Kettle lake, private access only (700 members of Landford Preston Lake Limited and Preston Lake Country Club)	

==== Distinction from Woodbine Racetrack ====
Woodbine Racetrack is in Etobicoke, and not anywhere close to Woodbine Avenue. Greenwood Race Track used to be located at the south end of Woodbine Avenue until it was demolished in 1994. Greenwood Race Track was the original Woodbine Racetrack until the construction of the current Woodbine Racetrack in 1956. The name was then transferred to the new facility. Known as "Old Woodbine Race Track" for several years, the facility changed its name to Greenwood Race Track after nearby Greenwood Avenue.

==== Woodbine Building Supply fire ====
On Christmas Eve in 2001, the Woodbine Building Supply fire occurred. The store was located at the intersection of Danforth and Woodbine. It was one of the biggest fires in Toronto's history, as 170 firefighters were required to bring the six-alarm blaze under control. The building was less than 50 metres from residences in the neighborhood and more than 50 families had to evacuate their homes on Christmas morning. One person was killed and another was severely disfigured. Police and insurance quickly suspected arson and several people have been convicted.
