= Jawish =

Jawish is a surname of turkish origin. Notable people with this surname include:

- Heinie Jawish (1900–1941), Syrian-born American professional football player
- Milad Jawish (born 1973), Lebanese-born Canadian Melkite Catholic bishop
