= Gormley, Ontario =

Gormley
- Unincorporated community
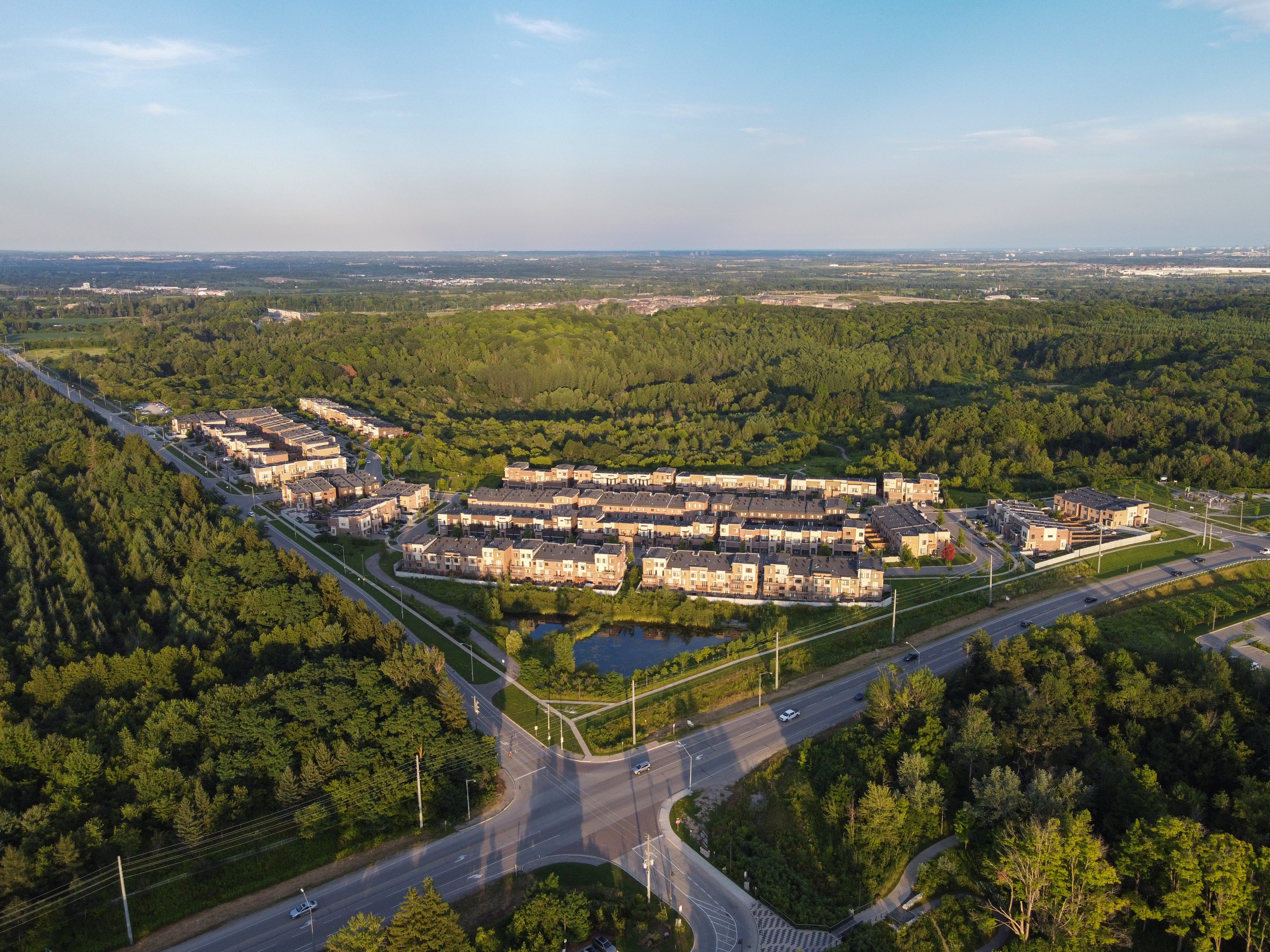
- Aerial view of Gormley near Lake Wilcox Park
- Interactive map of Gormley
- Coordinates: 43°56′27″N 79°22′55″W
- Country: Canada
- Province: Ontario
- Regional municipality: York Region
- Town: Whitchurch–Stouffville, Richmond Hill
- Amalgamation: (With Town of Stouffville); 1 January 1971
- Elevation: 257 m (843 ft)
- Time zone: UTC−5 (EST)
  - Summer (DST): UTC−4 (EDT)
- Forward sortation area: L0H, L4E
- Area codes: 905, 289, 365, and 742
- NTS Map: 030M14
- GNBC Code: FBIOH

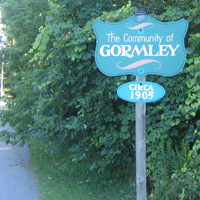
A sign found on Gormley Road East.

Gormley is a hamlet in York Region, Ontario, Canada that overlaps parts of Richmond Hill, and Whitchurch–Stouffville, two municipalities within the Greater Toronto Area. It was divided into two parts due to the construction of Highway 404. A portion of Gormley situated within Richmond Hill's political boundaries is subject to "Heritage Conservation District" controls. A post office in Gormley (East) serves as the mailing address for the Whitchurch–Stouffville communities of Bethesda, Gormley, Preston Lake, Vandorf, and Wesley Corners.

Gormley Road East, on the south side of Stouffville Road, leads to Gormley Court and a dead-end at the railroad tracks. On the other side of the tracks, accessible by Leslie Street, is Gormley Road West. The community had a railway station until it was demolished in the early 1970s. Many of the houses are approximately 100 years old. The community celebrated its 100th anniversary in 2005.

== History ==
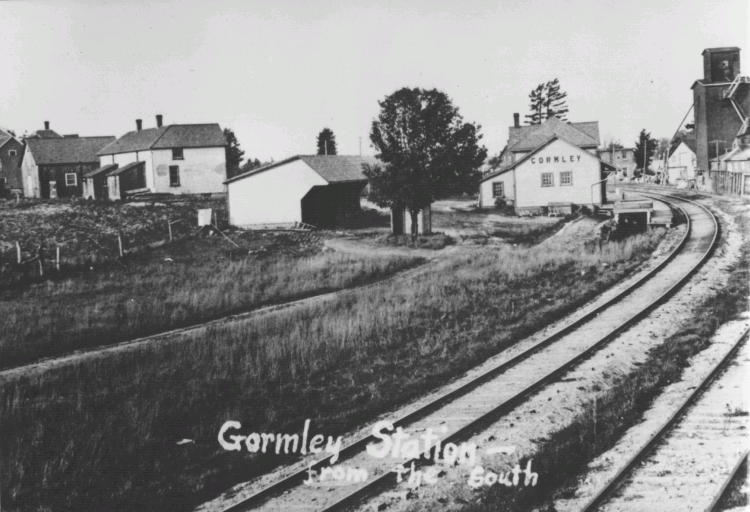
New Gormley from the South in the early 20th Century. Seen from left to right: blacksmith shop, David and Jacob Heise's double house, driveshed, railway station, North American Cement Block and Tile Company office.

At the time of European settlement, Gormley was a black ash swamp which provided timber for many early pioneer buildings. There was possibly a post office as early as 1847. However, Gormley's origins are most closely associated with James Gormley, an Irishman who was variously a teacher, postmaster, auctioneer, and notary public.

James Gormley served as postmaster from 1851 to 1876. He settled at a crossroads adjoining the northeast corner of Lot 35 in Markham Township, which was at first known as Gormley's Corners until it was renamed simply "Gormley" in 1857. A store (which also served as the post office) was built there in 1860; the store burned down in 1935. A hamlet grew around the store, which straddled the townships of Markham to the south and Whitchurch to the north, both in the County of York.

The old community of Gormley is situated east of Highway 404 at the corner of Woodbine Avenue and Stouffville Road.

New Gormley or West Gormley, is the area near Leslie Street and Stouffville Road.

A rail line owned by Canadian National Railway runs through West Gormley; it is CN's primary freight corridor connecting Greater Toronto to Northern Ontario and Western Canada. In 1907, a station was constructed in Gormley on Station Street (Road), south of the original Stouffville Sideroad. The arrival of the railway was significant in the development of New Gormley, as a cluster of businesses that relied on the rail service grew up around the station. Houses of the owners and other buildings contributed to further expansion of the community, which by the 1920s housed a general store, a blacksmith's shop, a garage, a planing mill, a grain elevator and feed mill, and a cement block and tile company. Many red-brick two-story homes were built along the main street. The station was important to local farmers who shipped milk and other produce from here to the city. The Gormley railway station was demolished in the early 1970s. Station Road, that once led to station, is now a narrow dead end street that gives access to a few homes and businesses from Gormley Road. At the end of Station Road is an abandoned house, known locally as the "Ghost House" and it was the home of the trainmaster in the past.

There is now a new GO Transit commuter train and bus station that is the last stop on the Richmond Hill line from Union Station in Toronto. The station is located near Stouffville Road and Gormley Road East. Five trains run south to Union during the morning commuter period, and five trains make the return trip back to Gormley from Union during the afternoon rush. During off-peak hours, buses run. Both the bus (61) and trains of the Richmond Hill corridor run on weekdays only (excluding holidays), unlike the other GO train lines.

Ken Baker (June 19, 1932 – October 31, 2021), a lifelong resident of New Gormley had a big influence on the nearby community of Oak Ridges. In the late 1940s, he, along with his father and his brother dug what is now known as the Baker's Pits, 2 ponds north of Lake Wilcox that add to the community and make for a scenic walk in the park.

At the intersection of Woodbine Avenue and Stouffville Road lies Famous Sam's, named after the founder, Spyros “Sam” Kabiotis (November 21, 1925 – July 15, 2002). An all day breakfast diner, it started as Cousin’s Dairy Shop in 1960 and has served the community as a restaurant since 1963. The classic diner has much history and inside, there are vintage pictures of hockey players from a bygone era.

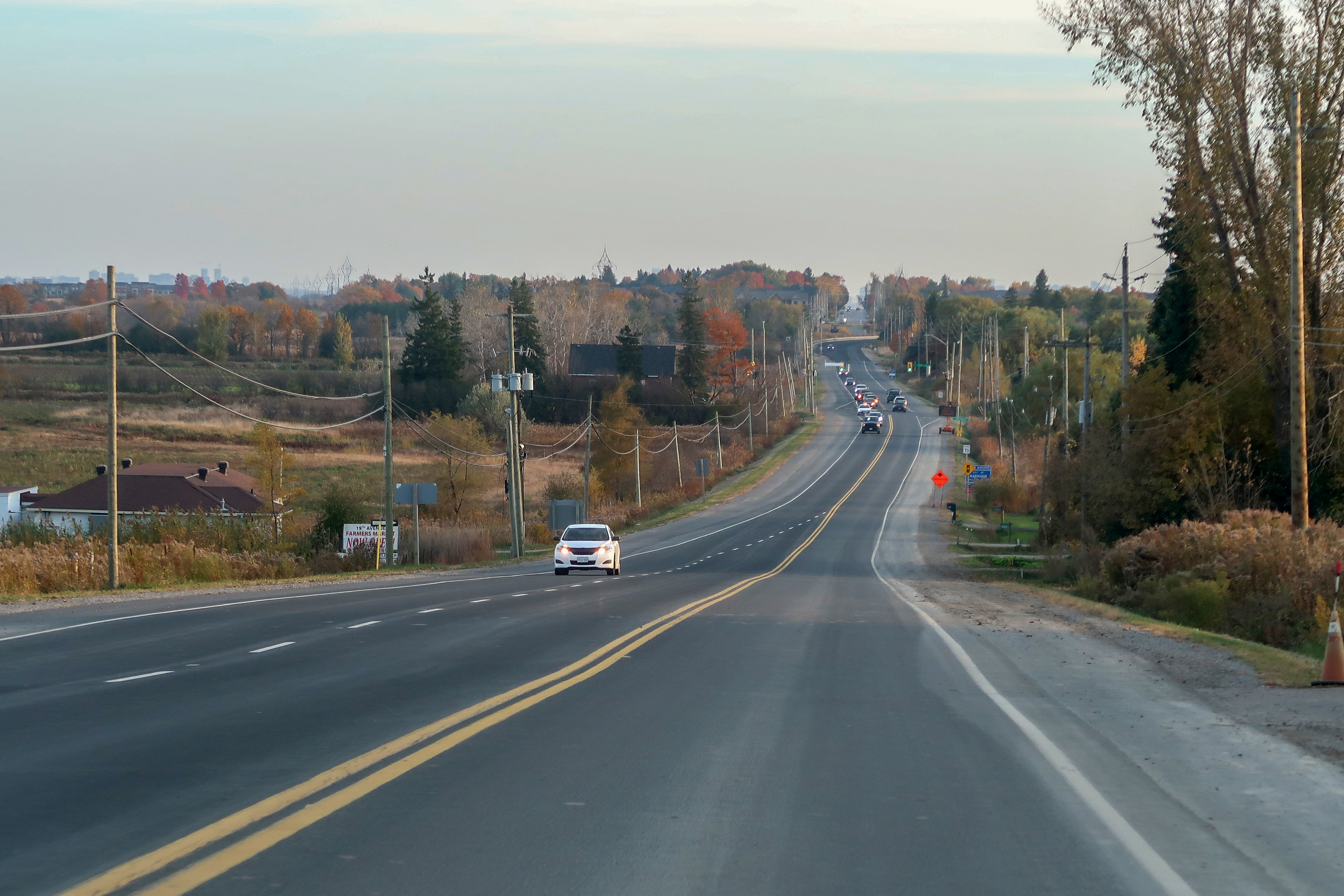
19th Ave in Gormley

A future challenge to the community of Gormley is the proposed development of an international airport immediately south-east of Whitchurch–Stouffville (the Pickering Airport lands). Under the current plan, the approach for one of the three landing strips would be directly over Gormley, with planes descending above the hamlet from an elevation of 521 metres to 480 metres. The plan anticipates 11.9 million passengers per year (or 32,600 per day) by 2032. A "Needs Assessment Study" was completed by the Greater Toronto Airports Authority for the federal government in May 2010. After a "due diligence review," Transport Canada released the report in July 2011 and announced the decision to proceed in June 2013.

In 2017, residents of New Gormley came together to design a community flag and held a referendum to secede from Richmond Hill, and the following year a mock mayoral race coinciding with the Ontario municipal elections in which resident Nigel Brown won. His campaign resonated with many in the community, asking Metrolinx to dim its GO station lights at night, slowing down development on the Oak Ridges Moraine, a local brewery to bring in visitors, and a bigger updated sign with a brief history of the community on it.

== Notable sites ==
The Town of Whitchurch–Stouffville Museum is located in Vandorf, which is north of Gormley, on Woodbine Avenue.

- Digital Leisure
- Gormley Missionary Church

== Climate ==
Climate data for Gormley, Ontario
Month	Jan	Feb	Mar	Apr	May	Jun	Jul	Aug	Sep	Oct	Nov	Dec	Year
Mean daily maximum °C (°F)	−2.9 (26.8)	1.7 (35.1)	3.7 (38.7)	11.9 (53.4)	19.4 (66.9)	23.8 (74.8)	27.0 (80.6)	25.7 (78.3)	20.4 (68.7)	13.2 (55.8)	6.7 (44.1)	0.1 (32.2)	12.6 (54.6)
Mean daily minimum °C (°F)	−11.7 (10.9)	−10.6 (12.9)	−5.7 (21.7)	1.2 (34.2)	7.2 (45.0)	11.5 (52.7)	14.7 (58.5)	13.9 (57.0)	9.4 (48.9)	3.3 (37.9)	−1.2 (29.8)	−7.8 (18.0)	2.0 (35.6)
Average precipitation mm (inches)	55.5 (2.19)	49.4 (1.94)	58.2 (2.29)	65.7 (2.59)	72.9 (2.87)	79.1 (3.11)	76.5 (3.01)	93.3 (3.67)	86.9 (3.42)	72.3 (2.85)	77 (3.0)	67.7 (2.67)	854.5 (33.61)
Source: Environment Canada (normals, 1971-2000)
