= Montreal Cathedral =

Montreal Cathedral may refer to:

- The Anglican Christ Church Cathedral
- The Roman Catholic Mary, Queen of the World Cathedral
- The Roman Catholic former cathedral Saint-Jacques
- The Ukrainian Orthodox Cathedral of St Sophie
- The Melkite Greek Catholic Saint Sauveur Cathedral
