= Victoria Square, Markham =

Victoria Square
- Preserved hamlet Neighbourhood
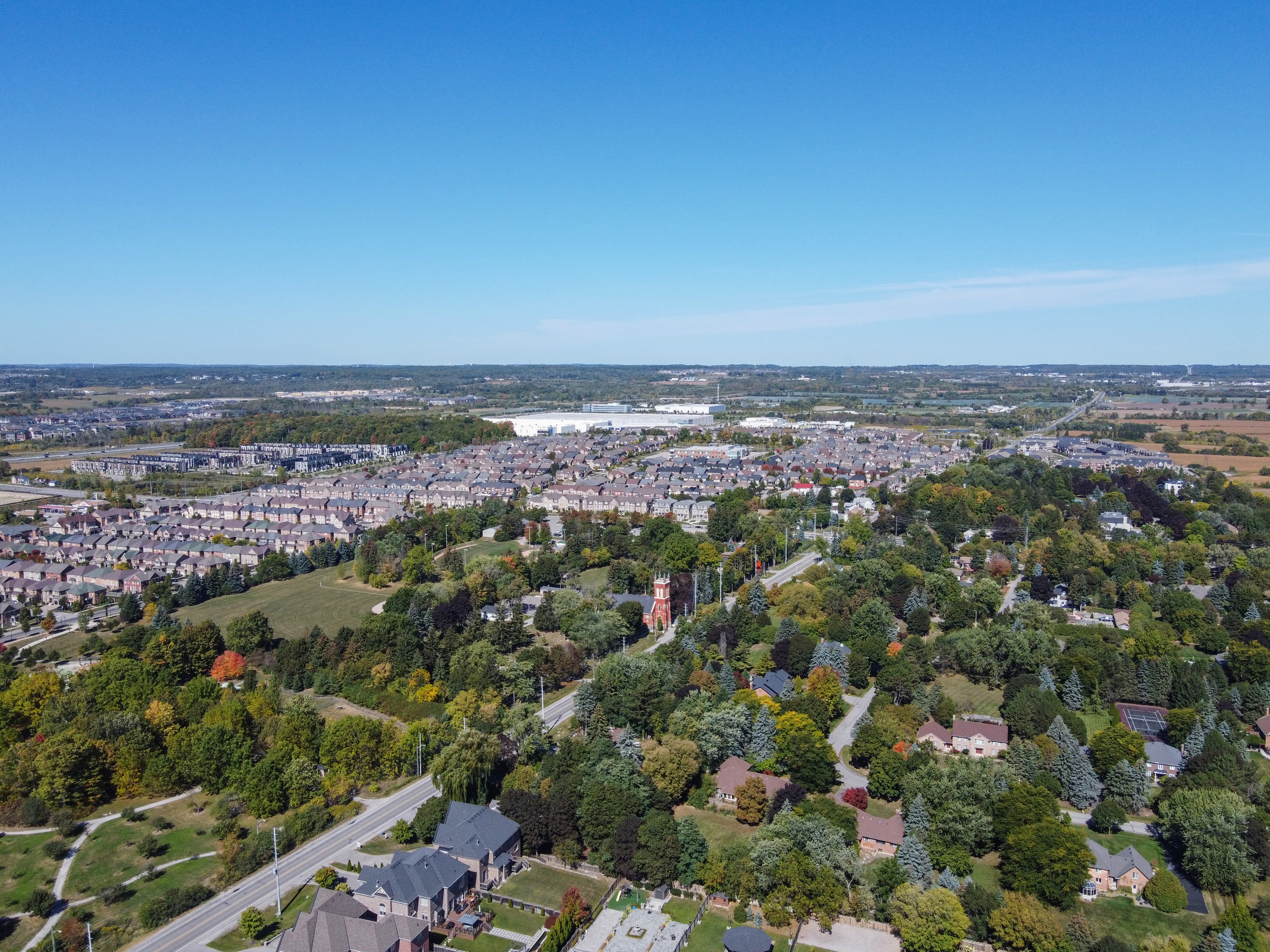
- Aerial view of Victoria Square in 2025
- Interactive map of Victoria Square
- Coordinates: 43°54′14″N 79°22′18″W
- Country: Canada
- Province: Ontario
- Regional municipality: York
- City: Markham
- Established: 1805
- Postal code: L6C
- NTS Map: 030M14
- GNBC Code: FCZYK

Victoria Square is a preserved hamlet and neighbourhood in Markham, Ontario, Canada. The community was founded in the early nineteenth century.

== History ==
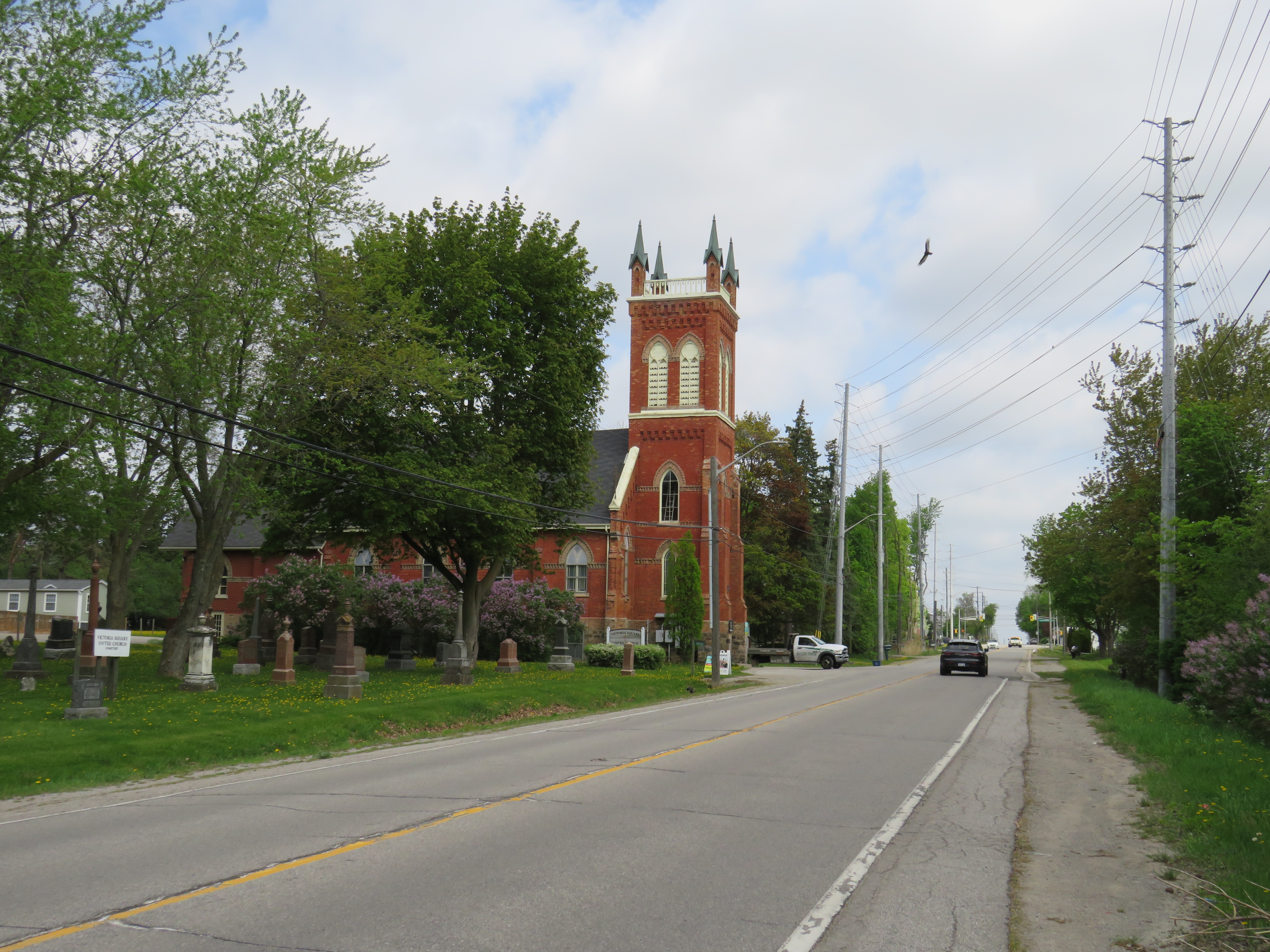
Victoria Square United Church

Historic Victoria Square began at 4th Line (Victoria Square Boulevard) and 18th Line (Elgin Mills Road) in 1805 with mostly Mennonites from Pennsylvania beginning in 1803 and then by British and American settlers in the 1820s. The area was initially called Heise Hill for the Heise family whom were part of the first wave of settlers.

The first church (Primitive Methodist) was built in 1830s on the east side of 4th Line, where the cemetery is still located. The Wesleyan Methodists built a wood-frame church south of the Victoria Square corner in 1845. This was replaced by a red brick edifice in 1880 at what was once William Frisby's old blacksmith shop.

The Wesleyan Methodists and Primitive Methodist merged locations in 1884 at what is now Victoria Square United Church.

A number of business emerged in the 1830 at the intersection of 4th Line and 18th Line:

- William Frisby blacksmith and farm implement shops southeast corner
- William Cantly's inn emerged in the 1830s on the northeast corner and later became a tavern when William Durose was granted a licence in 1849
- Post office was opened in the northwest corner in 1854

By 1860 and 1870s a few more businesses appeared:

- carriage maker - Joseph Hall
- John Rowbotham, former wheelwright with Frisby opened a shop manufacturing wagons and bobsled maker and repair to implements for Frisby

The 1877 SS No. 69 was opened further south and was used until 1966. The building was altered and became a business then as residence until it was restored back for use as a Montessori school in 2010.

The farmer implement related business would eventually disappear with competition of larger rivals in Toronto. The tavern destroyed by fire in the early 1900s was not replaced and the post office closed in 1914. The four corners were replaced by residences wiping out all traces of commercial activity in the area.

== Modern neighbourhood ==
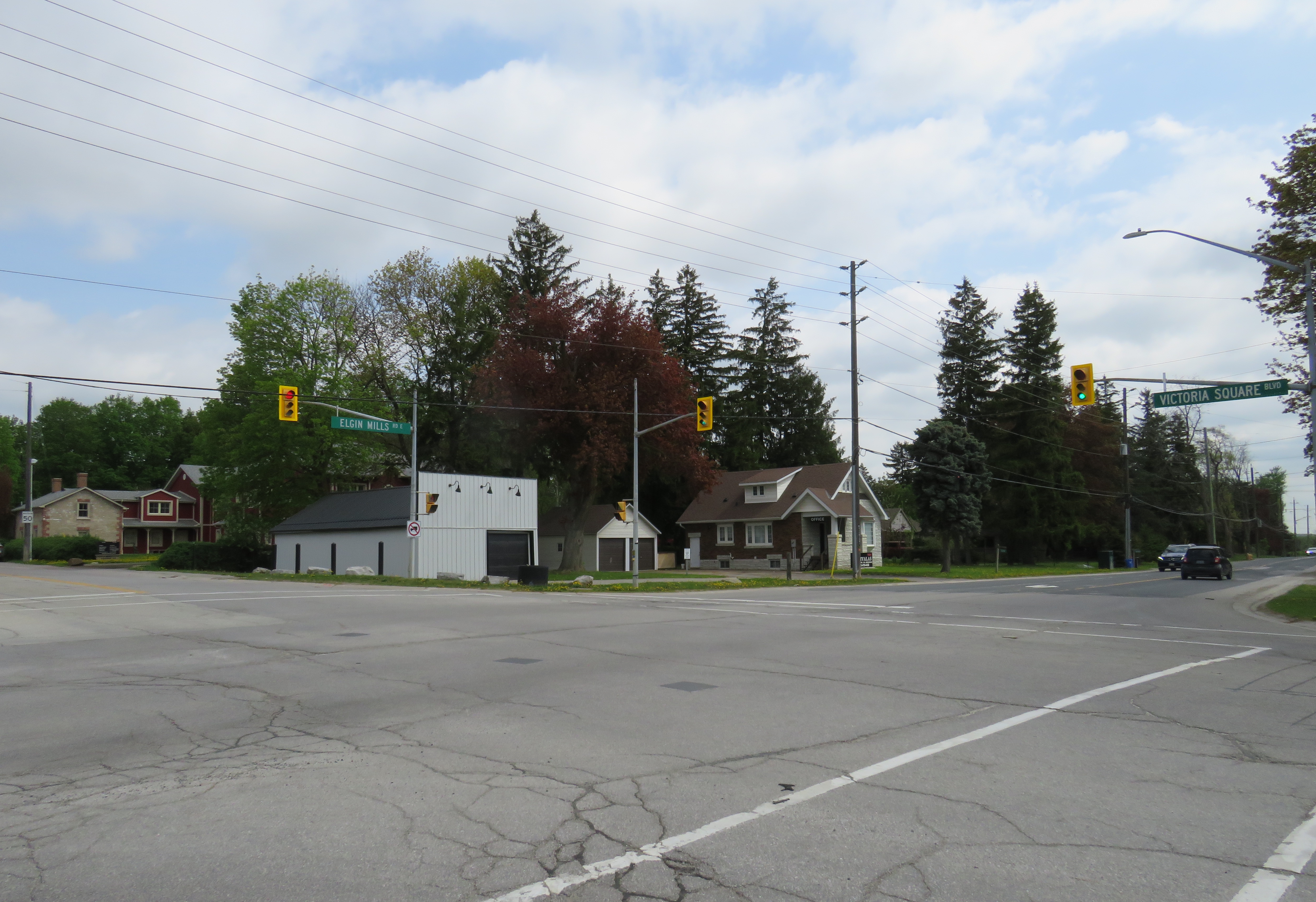
Intersection of Elgin Mills Rd. and Victoria Square Blvd.

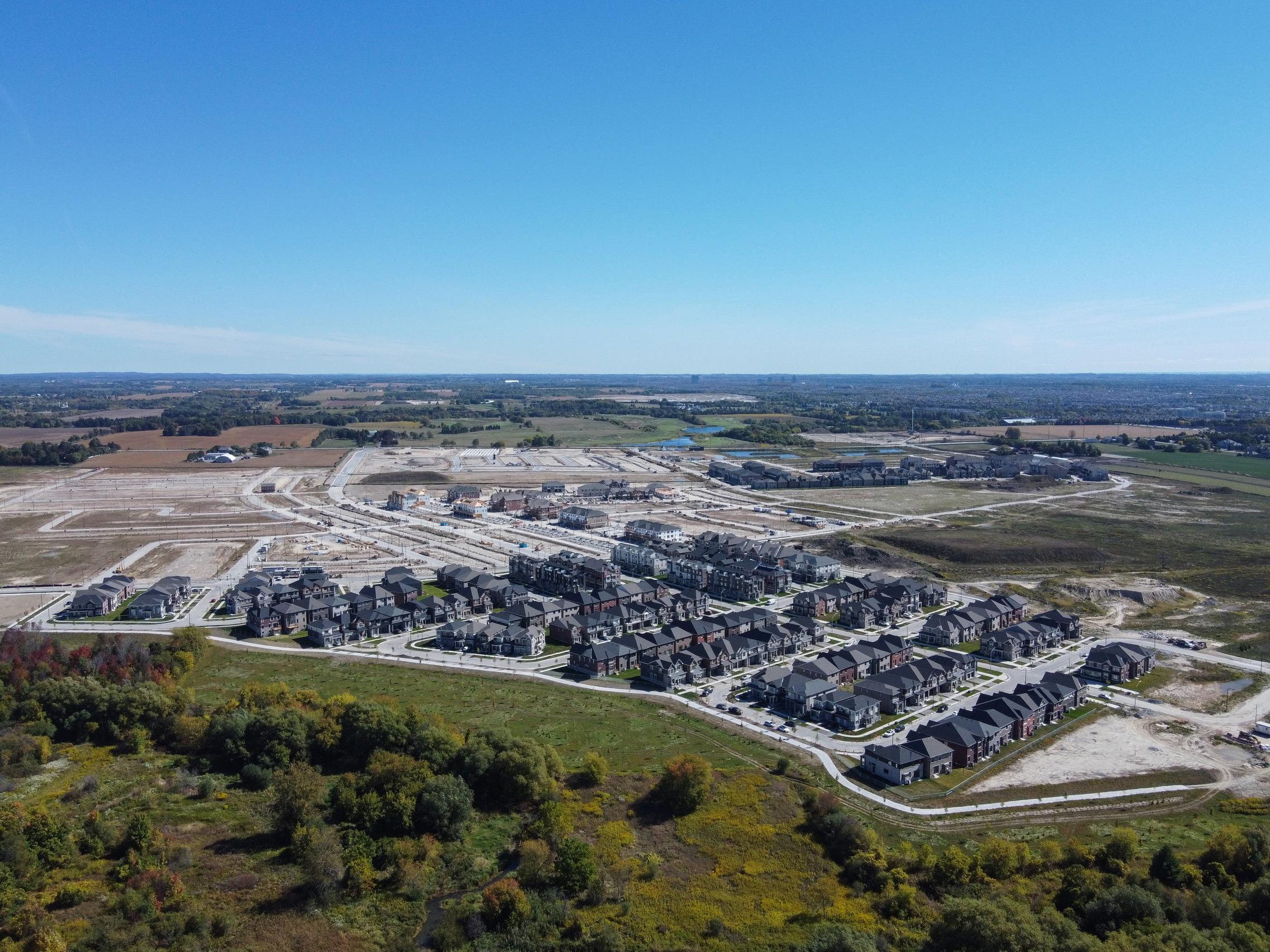
Aerial view of Unity Towns development in 2025

Residential development surrounding the hamlet began in the 2006 with the development of Cathedraltown to the south and west of Victoria Square and accelerated with the building of the new bypass of Woodbine Avenue in 2010.

Today, farmlands are slowly but progressively disappearing in the area and replaced with newer executive homes in the surrounding Unionville district. Most homes in the area are single-family dwellings. Farms now only exists in to the east of Victoria Square Boulevard (the original route of Woodbine Avenue) and north of Major Mackenzie Drive.

A number of business that operate off the land exists in Victoria Square:

- 19th Avenue Farmers' Market is a new generation of farming family whom operate a market and pick your own fields at 19th Avenue and Woodbine Avenue.
- Baker Saddlery - business selling equestrian equipment

New business to the area include Honda Canada Inc. Canadian corporate office and Mobis Parts Canada (a subsidiary of Hyundai).

The community of Victoria Square is centred on the intersection of Victoria Square Blvd. and Major Mackenzie Dr.

There are a few reminders in the new area of the originally settlers whom farmed the area:

- Frisby Park - named for Frisby family
- Boynton Circle - named for Boynton family
- William Cantley Park - named for William Cantley (and his inn)

== Parks and recreation ==
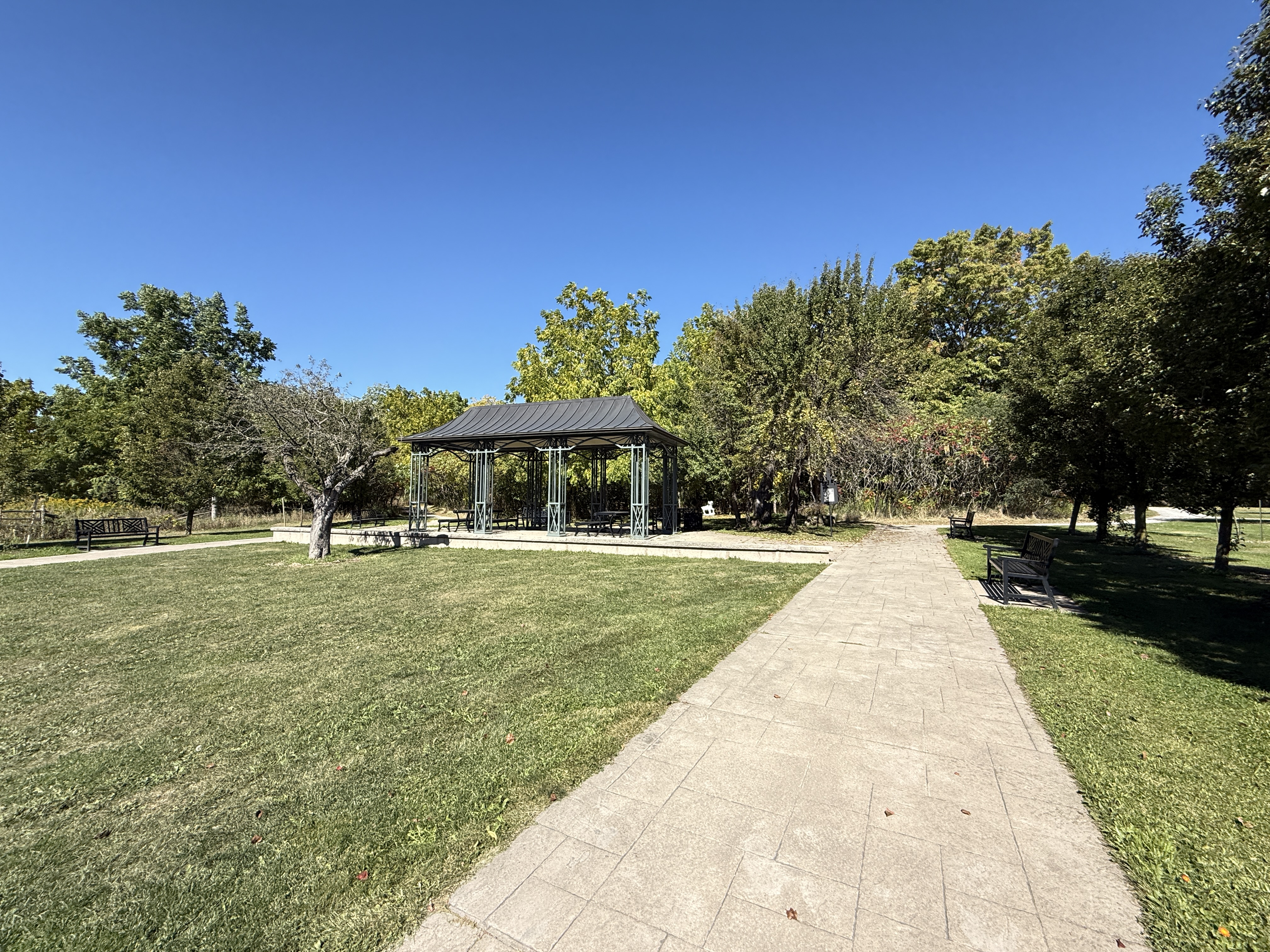
The Arboretum and Heritage Orchard

- Victoria Square Park
- Victoria Square Community Centre
- Cathedral (King David) Park
- Frisby Park
- Vine Cliff Park
- Hazelton Park
- Fletcher's Field
- Mossy Stone Park
- Charity Crescent Park
- William Cantley Park

== Education ==
There are three public elementary schools:

- Sir Wilfrid Laurier Public School (French Immersion, Grades 3–8)
- Sir John A Macdonald Public School
- Victoria Square Public School (Opened September 2018) (Dual Track French Immersion (Grades 1&2 FI, JK-8 English)

== Transportation ==
Due to its northerly location, most commuters in the area use the regional roads and Ontario Highway 404. The area is serviced by York Region Transit. The former Woodbine Avenue Bypass or Victoria Square Boulevard, Elgin Mills Road, Major Mackenzie Drive and Warden Avenue are the main arterial roads serving the area.

== Nearby communities ==
Other than Gormley, Victoria Square is surrounded by planned residential communities created from former farmlands.

== See also ==
- Cathedraltown
- List of unincorporated communities in Ontario
- Royal eponyms in Canada
