= Milad Jawish =

Lebanese Melkite Greek Catholic bishop in Canada (born 1973)

His Excellency Milad Jawish, BS
- Bishop of Saint-Sauveur of Montréal
- Church: Melkite Greek Catholic Church
- Diocese: Saint-Sauveur of Montréal
- Appointed: 18 September 2021
- Predecessor: Ibrahim Michael Ibrahim
- Successor: Incumbent

Orders
- Ordination: 6 May 2000 by André Haddad
- Consecration: 30 October 2021 by Youssef Absi, Elie Bechara Haddad and Ibrahim Ibrahim

Personal details
- Born: Milad Jawish; 19 December 1973 (age 52) Mansoura, Lebanon
- Education: Holy Spirit University of Kaslik, Pontifical Gregorian University, UCLouvain

Milad Jawish BS (born 19 December 1973) is a Lebanese-born Canadian Melkite Catholic hierarch, who has served as the Bishop of the Eparchy of Saint-Sauveur of Montréal since October 2021.

== Biography ==
=== Early life and education ===
Milad Jawish was born on 19 December 1973 in Mansoura, a village in the Western Beqaa District of Lebanon. He entered the Basilian Salvatorian Order on 14 August 1992 making his temporary vows on 21 August 1993 and his solemn perpetual profession on 10 October 1999.

He completed his early ecclesiastical studies in philosophy and theology at the Holy Spirit University of Kaslik (USEK) in Lebanon earning a Bachelor of Theology in 2001. Following his ordination his superiors sent him to Rome to pursue advanced studies at the Pontifical Gregorian University where he earned a Licentiate in Biblical Theology in 2007. He later completed his doctoral program in 2015 receiving a PhD in Biblical Theology from the Catholic University of Louvain.

=== Priesthood ===
Jawish was ordained a deacon on 20 November 1999 by Archbishop Georges Ibrahim Kwaïter and was ordained a priest on 6 May 2000 by Archbishop André Haddad. He served as the Vice President of the seminary formation program at the minor seminary of his order in Joun from 2002 to 2007. During his tenure there he also ministered as parish priest at the Holy Cross parish in Jeita from 2004 to 2007. Between 2007 and 2011 he served as the general secretary of his monastery.

He later relocated to Europe and served as the pastor of Saint-Jean-Chrysostome parish in Brussels, Belgium, from 2011 and subsequently obtained a Belgian citizenship.

=== Episcopate ===
On 18 September 2021, Pope Francis assented to his election by the Melkite Patriarchal Synod as the Eparchial Bishop of Saint-Sauveur of Montréal, succeeding Bishop Ibrahim Michael Ibrahim who was transferred to the Archeparchy of Zahle and Forzol.

He was consecrated to the episcopate on 30 October 2021 at the Convent Saint-Sauveur in Joun, Lebanon, and installed on 28 November 2021 at the Saint Sauveur Cathedral in Montreal. The principal consecrator was Melkite Patriarch Youssef Absi, assisted by co-consecrators Archbishop Elie Bechara Haddad and Archbishop Ibrahim Ibrahim.

During the 2022 papal visit to Canada by Pope Francis, Bishop Jawish engaged with national media outlets to emphasize the critical role of Catholic reconciliation initiatives with Indigenous communities.
