= Vandorf Sideroad CNR Bridge =

Coordinates: 43.9976°N 79.3912°W

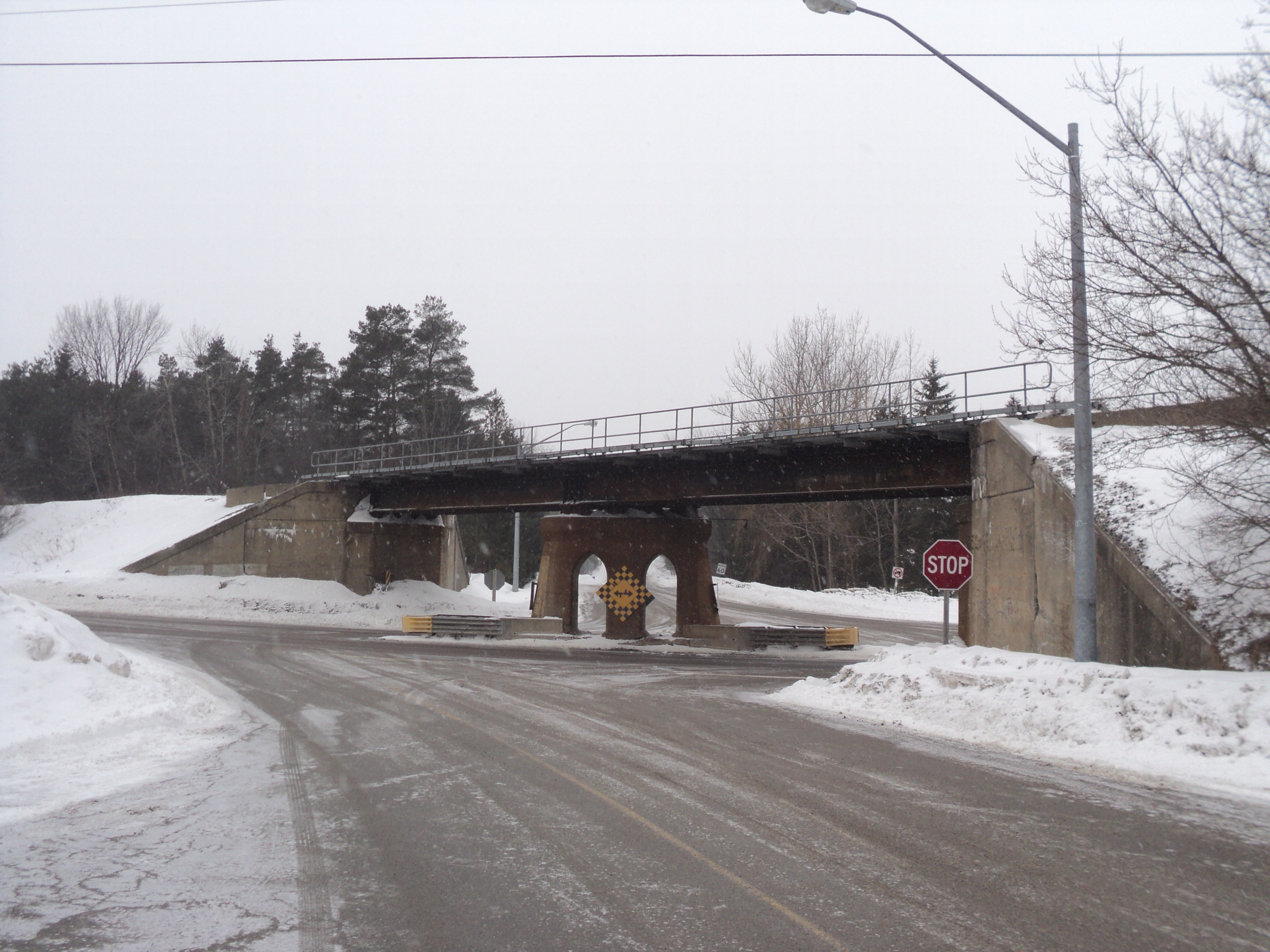
The bridge, looking west

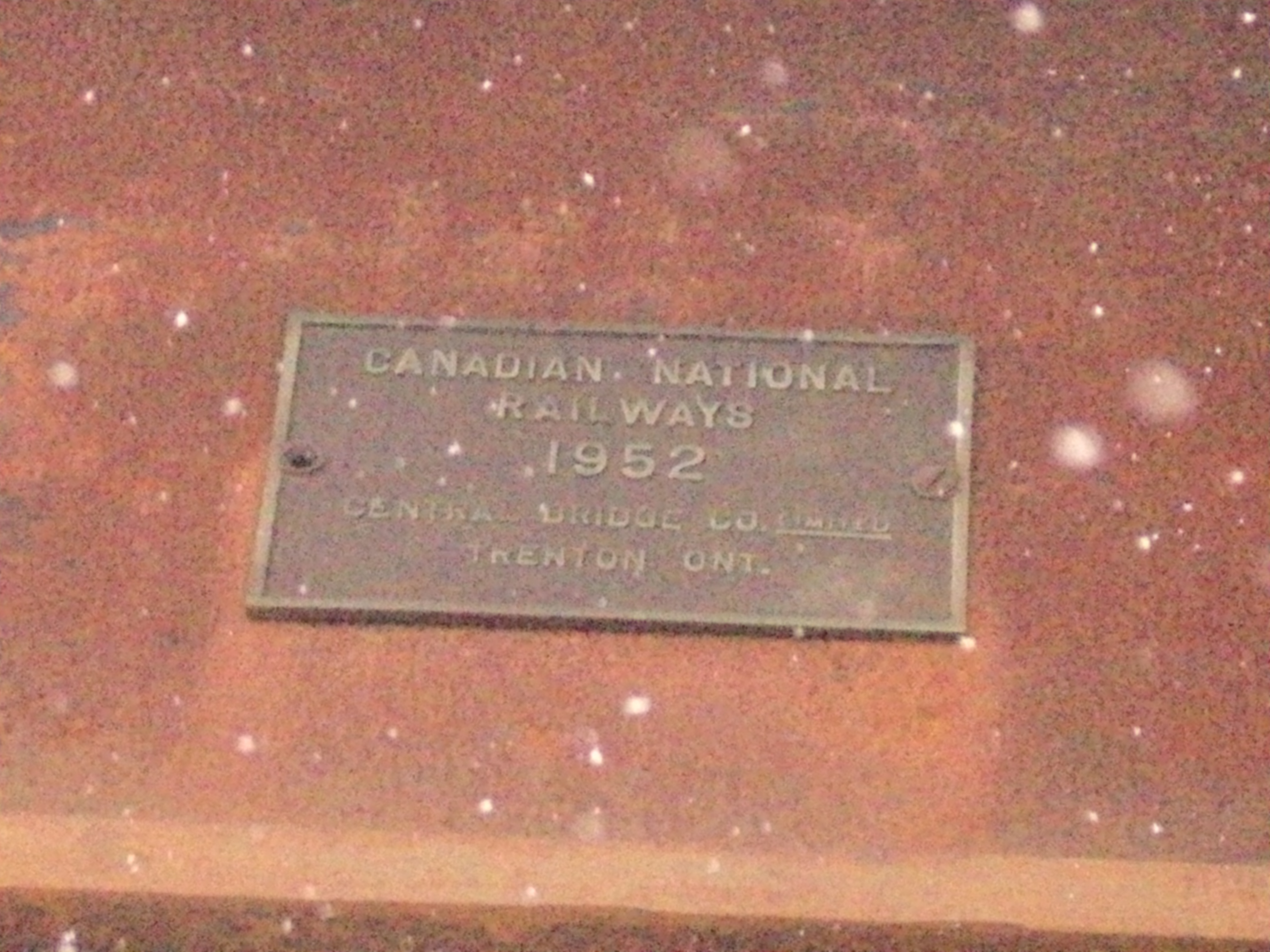
Builder's plate on the bridge

The Vandorf Sideroad CNR Bridge is a railway bridge in the community of Vandorf, in the town of Whitchurch-Stouffville, Ontario, Canada. The bridge carries the line known as the Canadian National Railway Bala Subdivision and crosses Woodbine Avenue diagonally at Vandorf Sideroad.

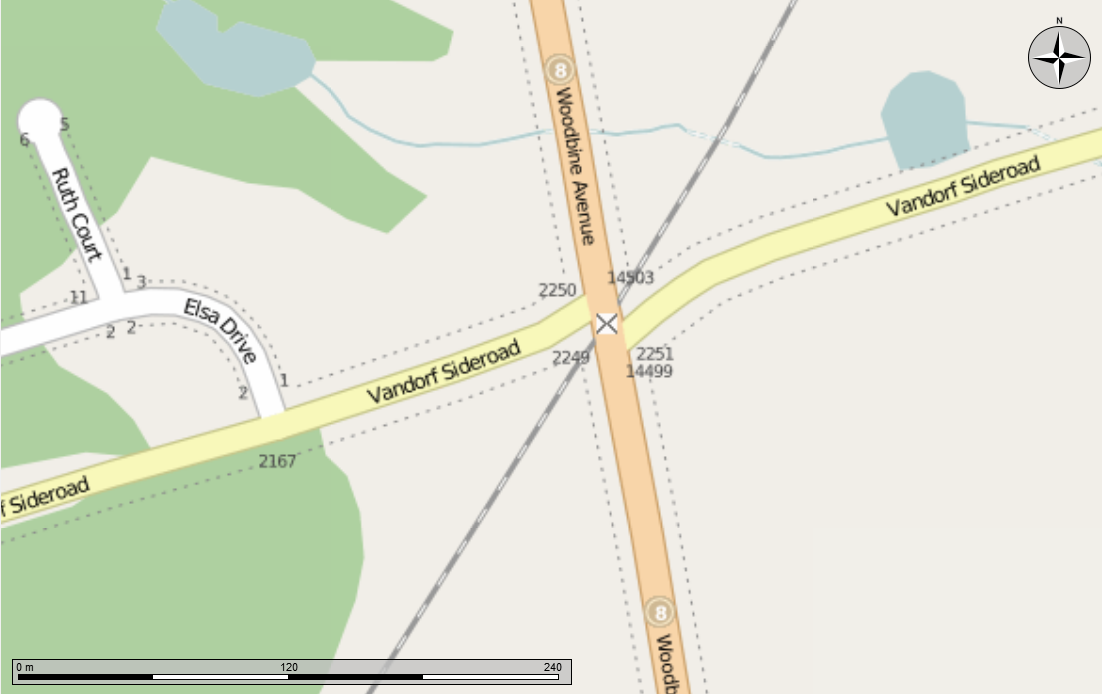
Map showing the location of bridge

The concrete bridge abutments were built in 1950, and the builder's plate on the bridge confirms the steel deck was constructed in 1952 by the Central Bridge Company in Trenton, Ontario. It is mapped at approximately 302 metres above sea level.
