= Cathedraltown =

- Neighbourhood
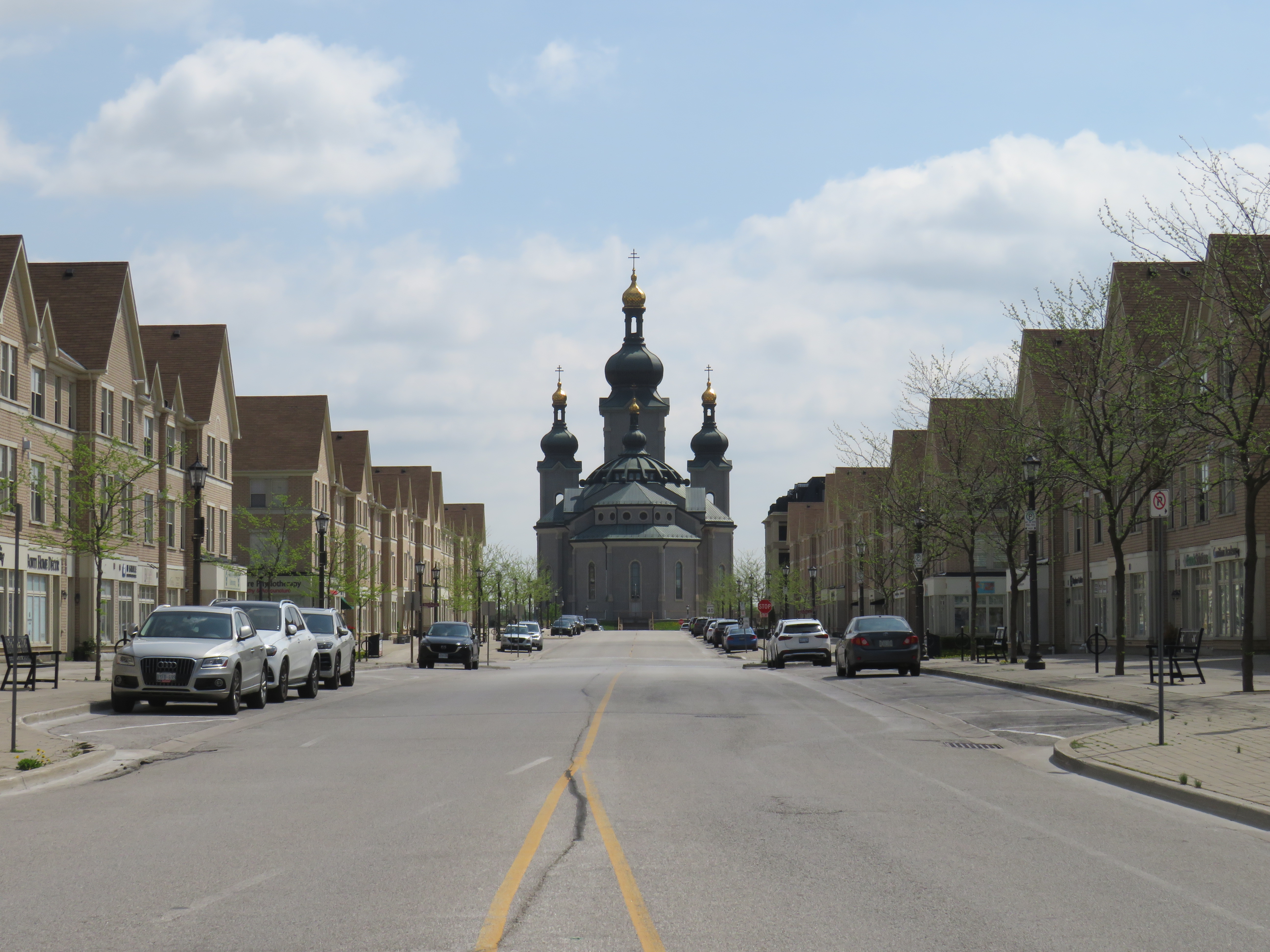
- The new urbanist Cathedral High Street in Cathedraltown, looking towards the Cathedral of the Transfiguration
- Interactive map of Cathedraltown
- Coordinates: 43°53′37″N 79°22′28″W
- Country: Canada
- Province: Ontario
- Regional municipality: York
- City: Markham
- Established: 2006

Population (2006 est.)
  - Total: 3,000
- Postal code: L6C

Cathedraltown is a planned neighbourhood with an estimated population of 3,000 in the City of Markham, Ontario. The neighbourhood was named after the Cathedral of the Transfiguration.

== Overview ==
The neighbourhood is bordered on the south by Major Mackenzie Drive, on the north by Elgin Mills Road, on the west by Highway 404, and on the east by Victoria Square Boulevard. Cathedraltown was designed with a new urbanism plan, and has a centrepiece "main street" named Cathedral High Street lined with storefronts, with the rear of the Cathedral of the Transfiguration (which fronts onto Victoria Square Boulevard) forming a terminating vista at its eastern end.

The neighbourhood is connected by several York Region Transit bus routes.

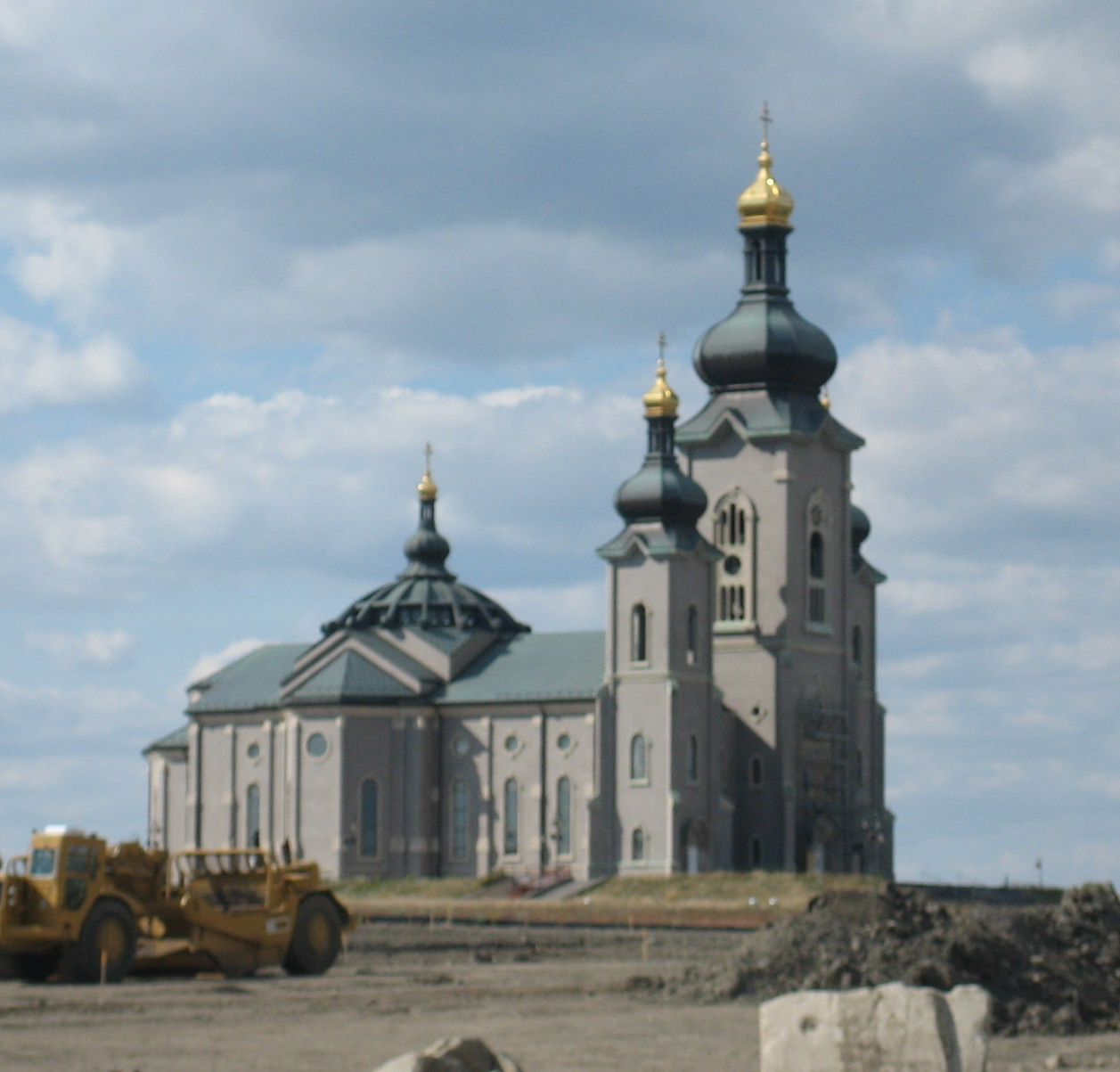
Cathedral of the Transfiguration

=== History ===
Cathedraltown was built on donated land from what was original part of a breeder's farm. It was designed by Donald Buttress, taking inspirations from the architecture of European cathedral towns, with designs resembling Regency and Georgian architectures that are popular in London during the late 18th and early 19th centuries. The first residents moved in by 2006.

In November 2010, a new westerly alignment of Woodbine Avenue was opened to preserve the nearby hamlet of Victoria Square to the north, with the old routing becoming the present Victoria Square Boulevard.

In July 2017 a statue of the cow Brookview Tony Charity was erected in Cathedraltown to some controversy. The statue is of a prize-winning cow that was owned jointly by Romandale Farms and Hanover Hill Farms, in the nearby town of Port Perry, where the cow resided. Romandale Farms donated the statue to honour Charity. Markham City Council voted to search for a new location for the statue in 2017, and the statue has been taken down and placed in storage since 2018.
