= Brookview Tony Charity =

American show cow

- Species: Cattle
- Breed: Holstein
- Sex: Female
- Born: August 6, 1978; Fremont, Ohio, United States
- Died: August 10, 1988; Port Perry, Ontario, Canada
- Resting place: Hanover Hill Holsteins
- Years active: 1978–1988
- Owners: John D. and Karl E. Havens 1978–1981, John D. and Karl E. Havens 1981–1988, Romandale Farms 1985–1988 (co owned with the Havens after 1985)

Brookview Tony Charity (Aug 6, 1978- Aug 10, 1988) was a notable show cow who at the height of her career was "considered by many to be the best cow ever to walk the face of the earth." Today she is still cited as the greatest North American show cow of all time.

Brookview Tony Charity was born in Fremont, Ohio on the farm of John D. and Karl E. Havens in early August 1978. She was a daughter of Kanza Matt Tony. She was purchased by Hanover Hill Holsteins of Port Perry, Ontario (owned by R. Peter Heffering and Ken Trevena) on November 13, 1981 and came to Canada afterwards. It was then that she began competing as a show cow. From 1982 to 1987 she won the top titles at both the Royal Agricultural Winter Fair and World Dairy Expo an unprecedented four times. The accolades included six superior production awards, nine times All-American and All-Canadian, never defeated in class. One expert described her as having the most correct overall conformation of any cow he'd ever seen. On July 15, 1985 a 50% share of the Holstein was purchased by Stephen B. Roman's Romandale Farms for a record $1.4 million. Hanover Hill Holsteins retained the balance of ownership.

She was also a prodigious producer of milk, perhaps one of the most productive in the world in the 1980s. At age 5 she produced 39,015 pounds (17,697 kg) of milk in a year. According to Andrew Hunt, founder of a major dairy magazine, The Bullvine, "She was incredible perfection!" This publication's list of the eight greatest North American show cows of all times ranks Charity at the top, with the comment, "Charity was never defeated in her class and 8 times was Grand at Madison or the Royal [Winter Fair]."

Despite these achievements, her genetic history was unremarkable, and while she produced many offspring, none have reached the same heights of achievement in show cow competitions.

She died of cancer in 1988.

== Memorial statue ==
In 2017, a statue of Brookview Tony Charity on stilts was unveiled in Cathedraltown, a neighbourhood built over the former site of Romandale farm. The bovine statue was donated by Helen Roman-Barber, Stephen Roman's daughter, and developer of the Cathedraltown neighbourhood. The stainless steel sculpture is named Charity, Perpetuation of Perfection and was sculpted by Ron Baird. During the summer of 2017, some residents of the area objected to the piece which is mounted on 8-meter-tall (26 ft) posts that elevate Charity high above a small parkette. Dairy farmer Ken Trevena who had cared for Charity during most of her life agreed that the "bottom side of the cow is not its best". After some debate on 25 September 2017 Markham Council, cowed by opposition, agreed to abide by the residents' objections and voted to move the statue to a new location (not yet specified) by year end.

In early December 2017, however, residents noted that new granite stonework had been added around the base of the sculpture. The city indicated that it still planned to move Charity to another location but the donor of the work disputed the city's claim of ownership and said the stonework was part of the plan. The Toronto Star reported that the city's agreement with the donor included a clause requiring consultation "with the donor prior to any final decision being made regarding the sculpture's removal and relocation" but that "the decision of the city shall be final."

An August 9, 2017 news item revealed that Brookview Tony Charity had never even visited Markham, having been stabled at Hanover Hill Holsteins in Port Perry from the day she arrived in Canada until her death. She was then buried at Hanover Hill.

In spite of the city's announced intentions to move the sculpture to one of three other locations, it remained on its original site in April 2018. In that month, Romandale Farms filed a lawsuit against the city with three options, based on the claim that it is still owned by developer Helen Barber-Roman who had donated it. The suit demands either a payment of $4 million, including $3 million for conversion of property and punitive damages, or the moving of the sculpture back to Barber-Roman, or confirmation that it will remain at the current location.

In early May 2018, a judge decided that residents should not be forced to accept an unwanted gift, and dismissed Barber-Roman's injunction to prevent the removal of the sculpture from its current site. The lawsuit against the City of Markham was not affected by this court decision.
