= Cathedral of the Transfiguration (Markham, Ontario) =

Slovak Catholic cathedral in Canada

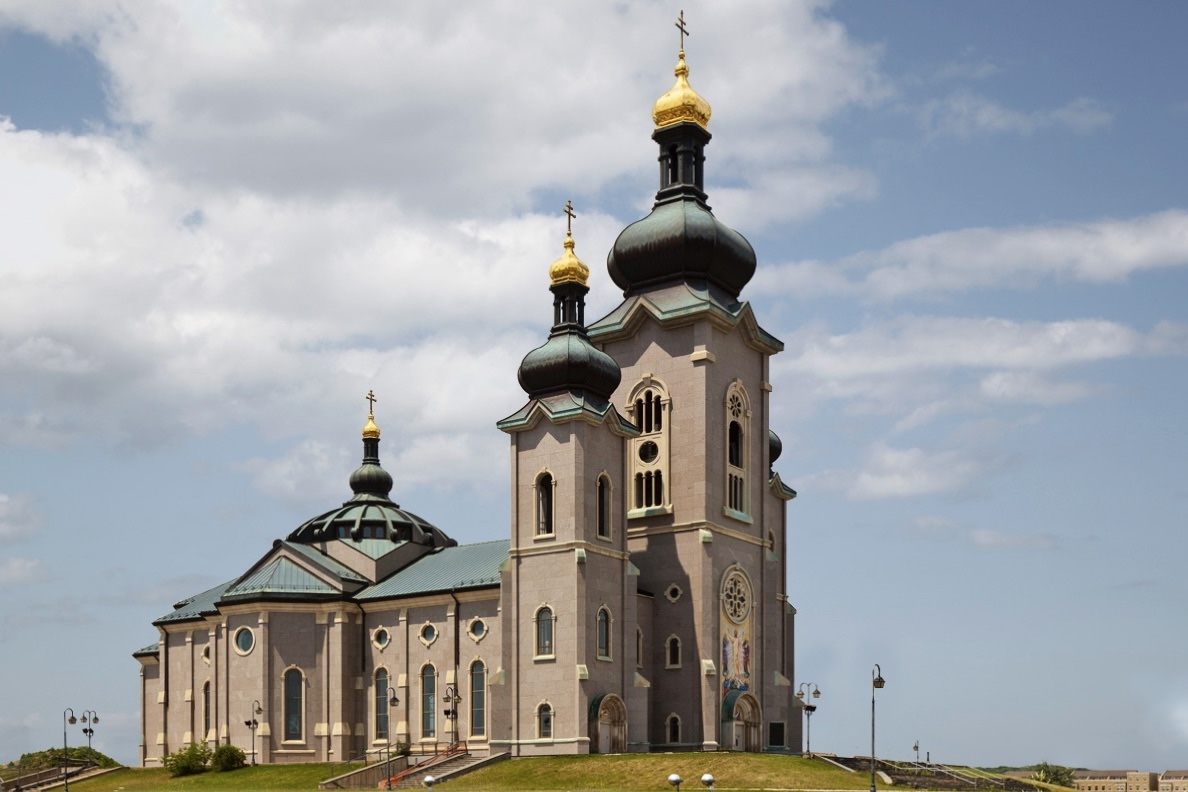
- The Cathedral of the Transfiguration in 2012
- Cathedral of the Transfiguration
- 43°53′39.53″N 79°22′16.17″W
- Location: Cathedraltown, Markham, Ontario, Canada
- Denomination: Catholic Church
- Sui iuris church: Melkite Greek Catholic Church (formerly Slovak Greek Catholic Church)

History
- Dedication: Transfiguration of Jesus

Administration
- Diocese: Eparchy of Saints Cyril and Methodius of Toronto (1984-2006); Melkite Greek Catholic Eparchy of Saint-Sauveur of Montréal (2016-)

The Cathedral of the Transfiguration is a Catholic former cathedral and current parish of the Transfiguration of Jesus Christ, first of the Slovak Greek Catholic Church and currently of the Melkite Greek Catholic Church. The cathedral, in Markham, Ontario, just north of Toronto, is the centrepiece and namesake of the later-developed Cathedraltown neighbourhood near Victoria Square, a former rural hamlet.

== History ==
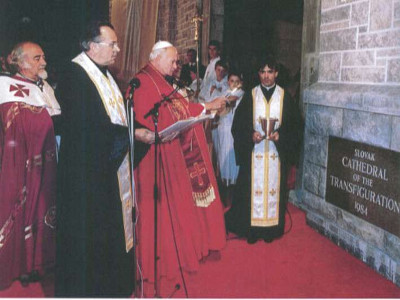
Pope John Paul II blessing the cornerstone of the cathedral, September 1984

The cathedral is located on land once part of Romandale Farms Inc., founded by the late Stephen B. Roman, a leading breeder and exhibitor of Holstein cows and the founder of Denison Mines Limited, a mining company. Mr. Roman, who arrived in Canada in 1937 from his native Slovakia, donated the land for the cathedral, which "he built as a beacon of religious freedom" for his fellow Slavs then living under Soviet oppression. Mr. Roman modelled the cathedral on the church (likely Church of Most Holy Mother of God Circ built some time between 1749 and 1843) in Veľký Ruskov (now Nový Ruskov), the Slovak village he was raised in.

Construction of the cathedral began in early 1984, and the cornerstone and altar stone were blessed by Pope John Paul II during his visit to Canada in September 1984, marking the first time that a Roman Pontiff had consecrated a church in North America. The cathedral, which is owned and administered by the Slovak Greek Catholic Church Foundation, was built to serve Slovak Catholics throughout the Greater Toronto Area (GTA), and until 2006, it was the seat of the Slovak Catholic Eparchy of Saints Cyril and Methodius.

Mr. Roman died in 1988 and did not see the cathedral completed. His funeral service was held in the partially completed structure, with 1,600 people in attendance.

Václav Havel, the first President of a democratic Czechoslovakia, following the fall of the Communist regime, visited the cathedral in 1990.

The exterior of the cathedral was used in the 1994 movie In the Mouth of Madness, where it portrayed the Black Church located in Hobb's End. It can also be seen on some of the posters promoting the film. It was also featured in the 2013 Canadian independent film Rearview, written and directed by Robert Gulassarian.

In 2006, following a dispute with the Slovak Greek Catholic Church Foundation, the Slovak Catholic Eparchy of Saints Cyril moved its seat to a church in Toronto. From 2006 to 2016, the cathedral was closed to the public while extensive interior work was carried out. Although work still remained to be done on the interior, in November 2016, the City of Markham issued a temporary occupancy permit to allow Jesus the King Melkite Greek Catholic Church to use the cathedral as a place of worship.

The Society of Saint Pius X currently uses the cathedral as one of their chapels under their St. Michael's Priory in the Southern Ontario area. The Society offers a Low Mass according to the Extraordinary form of the Roman Rite at 4:00 p.m. every Sunday at the cathedral.

== Design ==
The cathedral has three gilded towers, representing the Trinity. The centre tower, named the Tower of the Transfiguration, rises 64 m (210 ft). It contains one of the world's largest peals of three bells, weighing 14,500 kg (32,000 lb). The bells were cast in bronze at the Fonderie Paccard in the French town of Annecy and hung in the cathedral in 1986. Each of the cathedral's side towers is 45 m (148 ft) tall.

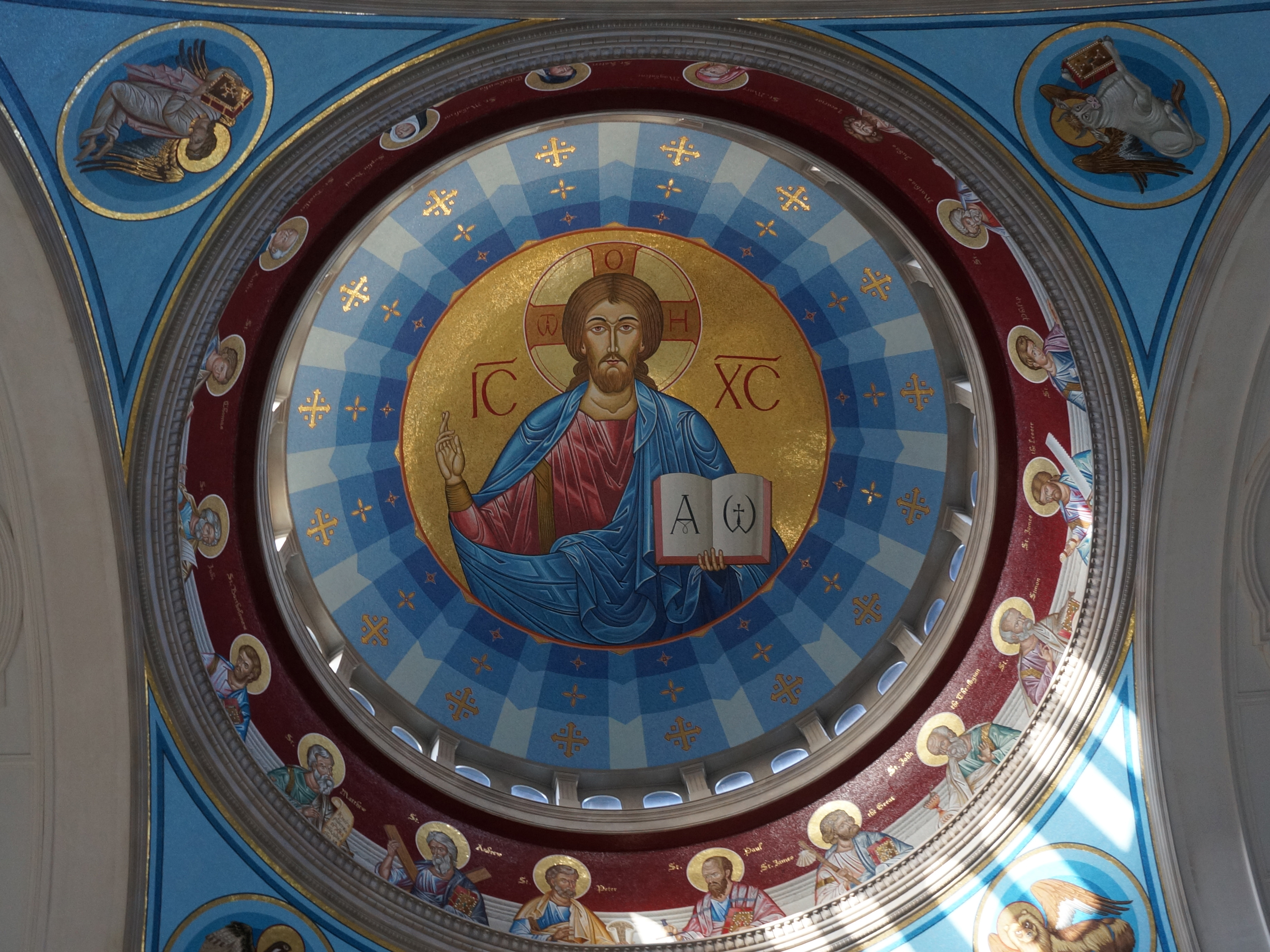
The interior of the dome.

The cathedral contains a 25-metre-wide (82-foot) mosaic of Christ Pantocrator, which occupies the entire dome of the cathedral, and a mosaic of the Virgin Mary, which covers the curved wall of the apse. In 2017, mosaics were installed in the circle under the dome and in the pendentives, which connect the dome to its four supporting pillars. While reflecting biblical themes, the content of the mosaics differs from traditional renderings. In addition to the 13 Apostles, the mosaics in the circle also contain images of St. Mary Magdalene; a French saint, St. Madeline Sophie Barat, founder of Les Religieuses du Sacré-Cœur; and two Canadian saints, St. Kateri Tekakwitha and St. Brother André of Montreal. The mosaics in the pendentives, containing biblical manifestations of the four Evangelists, replace the traditional images of a lion, eagle and ox with the more Canadian wolverine, peregrine falcon and cow, respectively.

The cathedral also features a restored Casavant Frères concert organ.

== Gallery ==
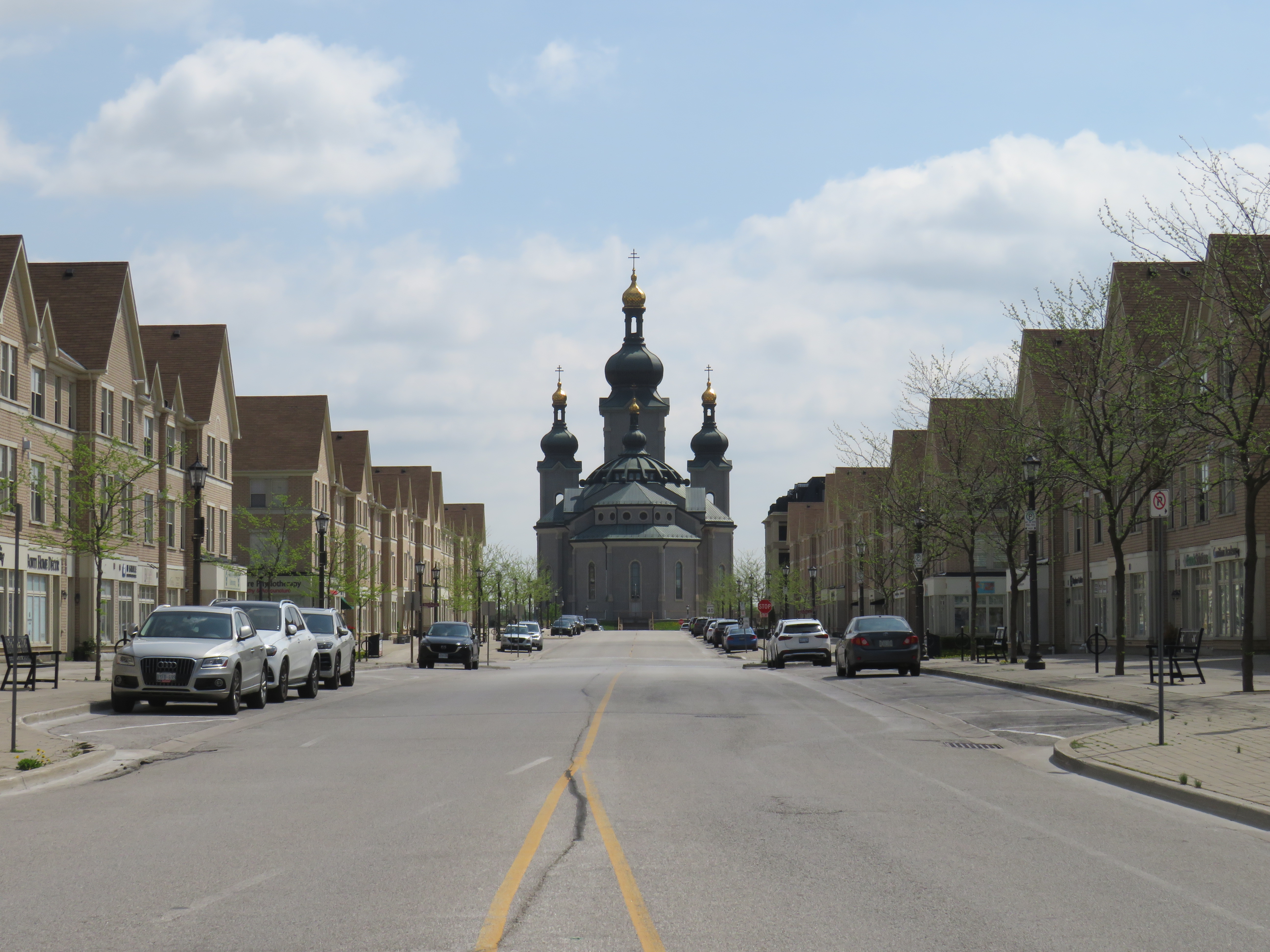
Rear view of the cathedral looking east down Cathedral High Street

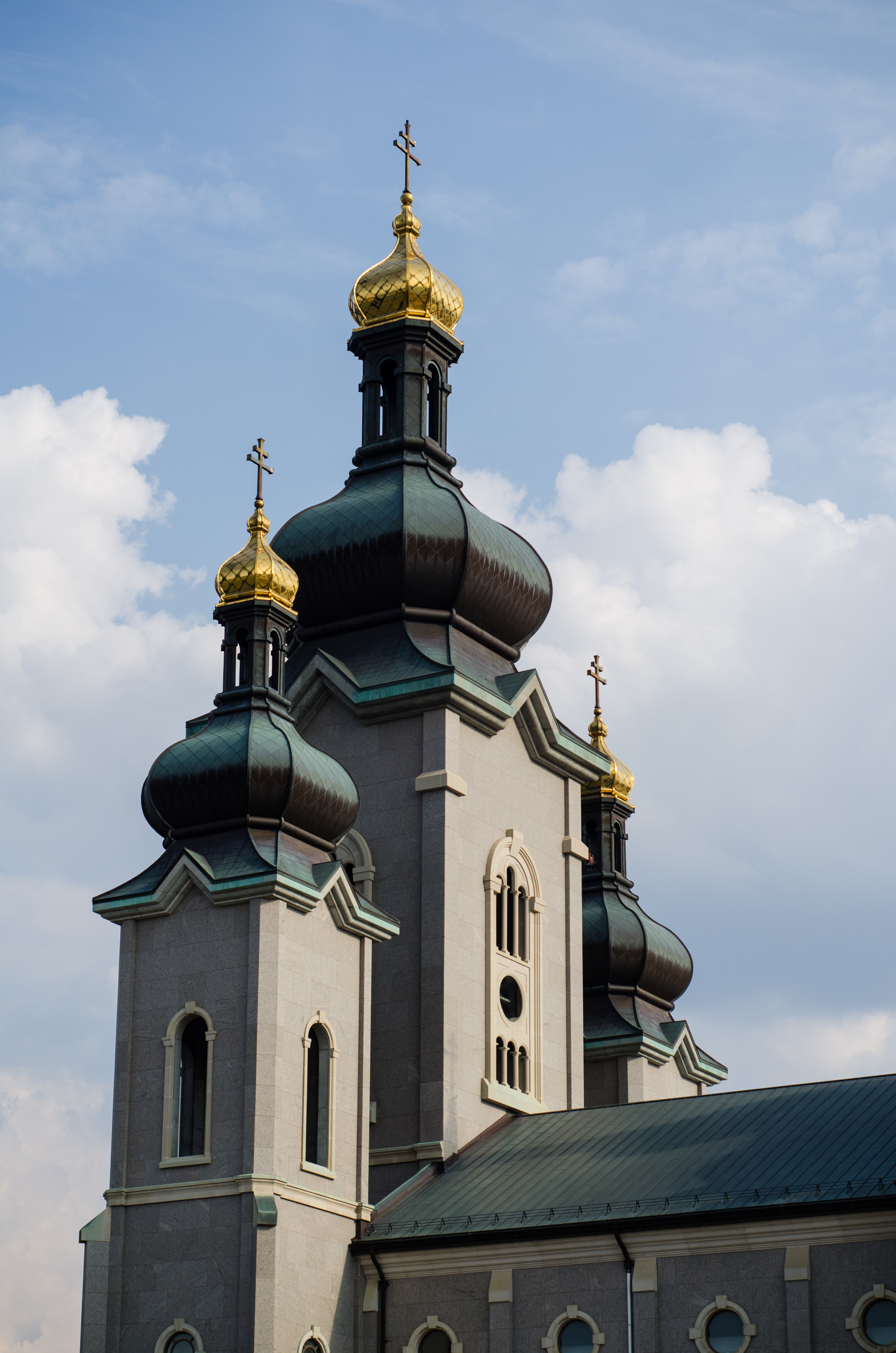
The building features three gilded towers, which represent the Trinity.

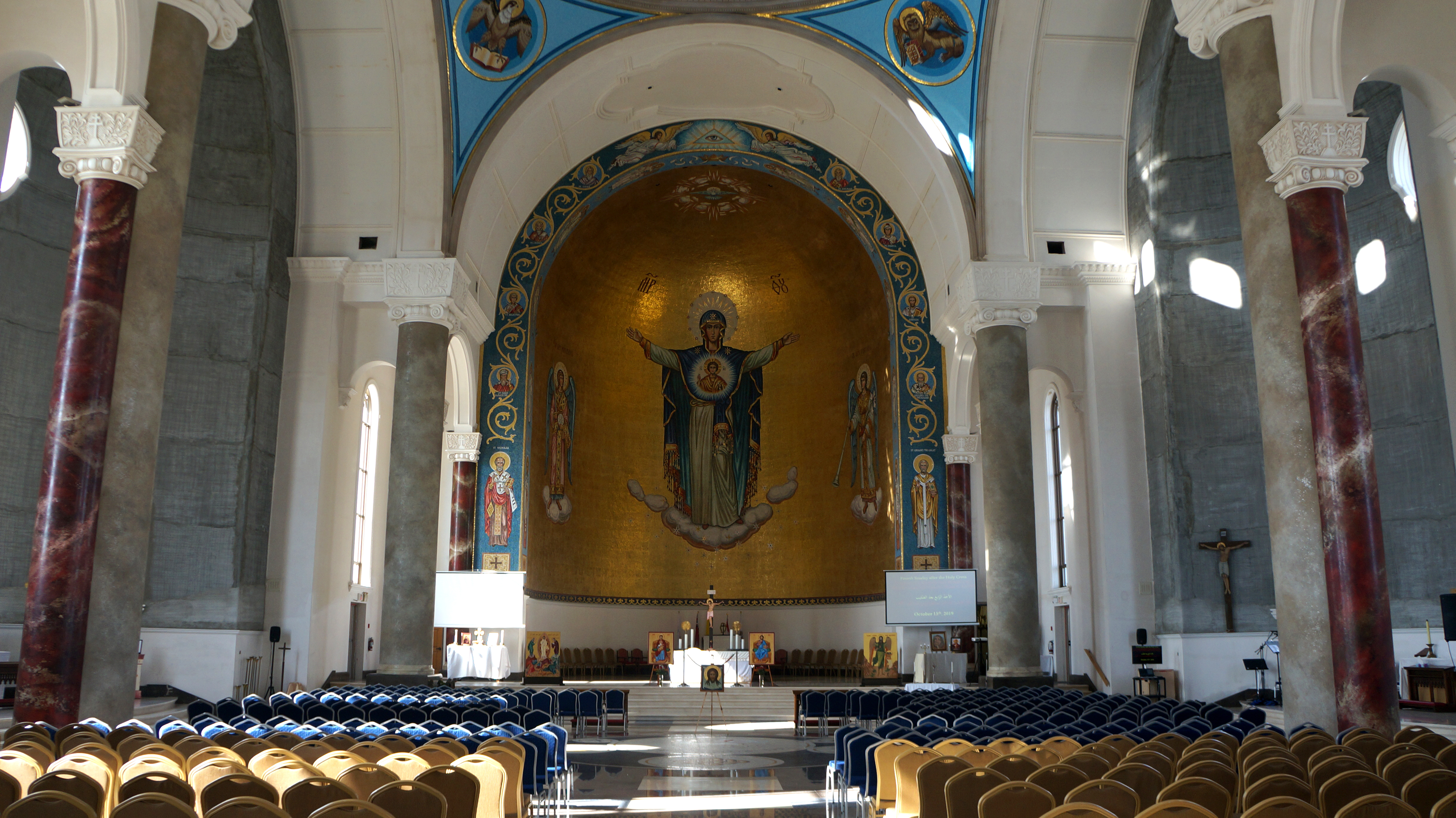
Interior

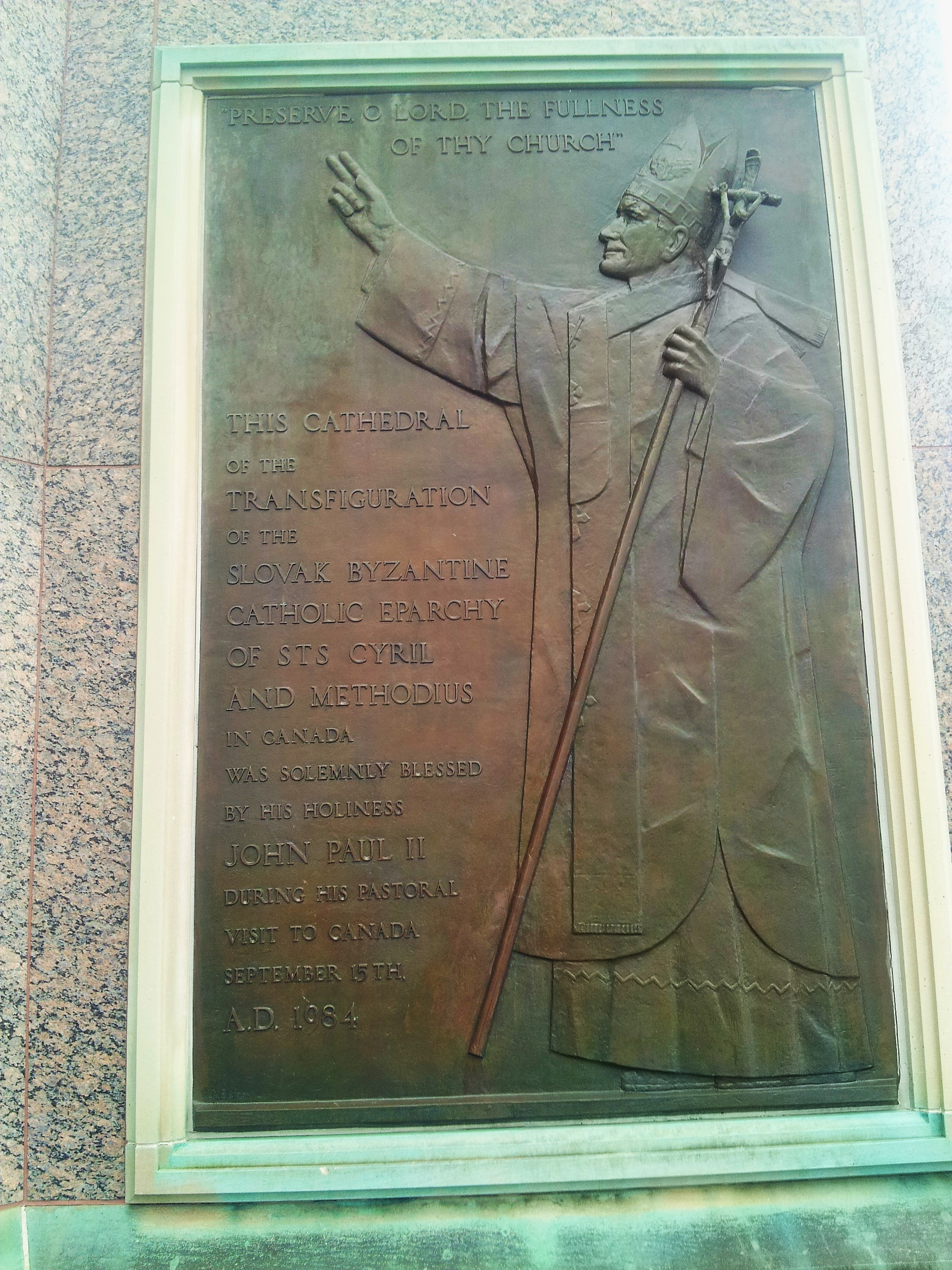
Relief of Pope John Paul II

== See also ==
- Slovak Catholic Eparchy of Saints Cyril and Methodius of Toronto
- Slovak Greek Catholic Church
- John Carpenter's In the Mouth of Madness

== Newspaper reports ==
- "Thousands attend as new cathedral's giant bells blessed." The Ottawa Citizen. Ottawa: Aug 16, 1986. pg. A.23
- "Church at the centre; A European-style community will take shape around golden-domed Byzantine Slovak cathedral Built by magnate with grand vision" by Pat Brennan. Toronto Star. Toronto: Apr 17, 2004. pg. M.01
- "Eparchy site in Markham Roman reticent about role in constructing cathedral" Kelley Teahen. The Globe and Mail. Toronto: Oct 26, 1985. pg. A.21
- "Progress slow on Byzantine shrine Hundreds worship in unfinished cathedral" Caroline Byrne. Toronto Star. Toronto: Jul 3, 1989. pg. A.6
