= Melkite Greek Catholic Eparchy of Saint-Sauveur of Montréal =

Eastern Catholic eparchy in Canada

Eparchy of Canada (Melkite Greek)
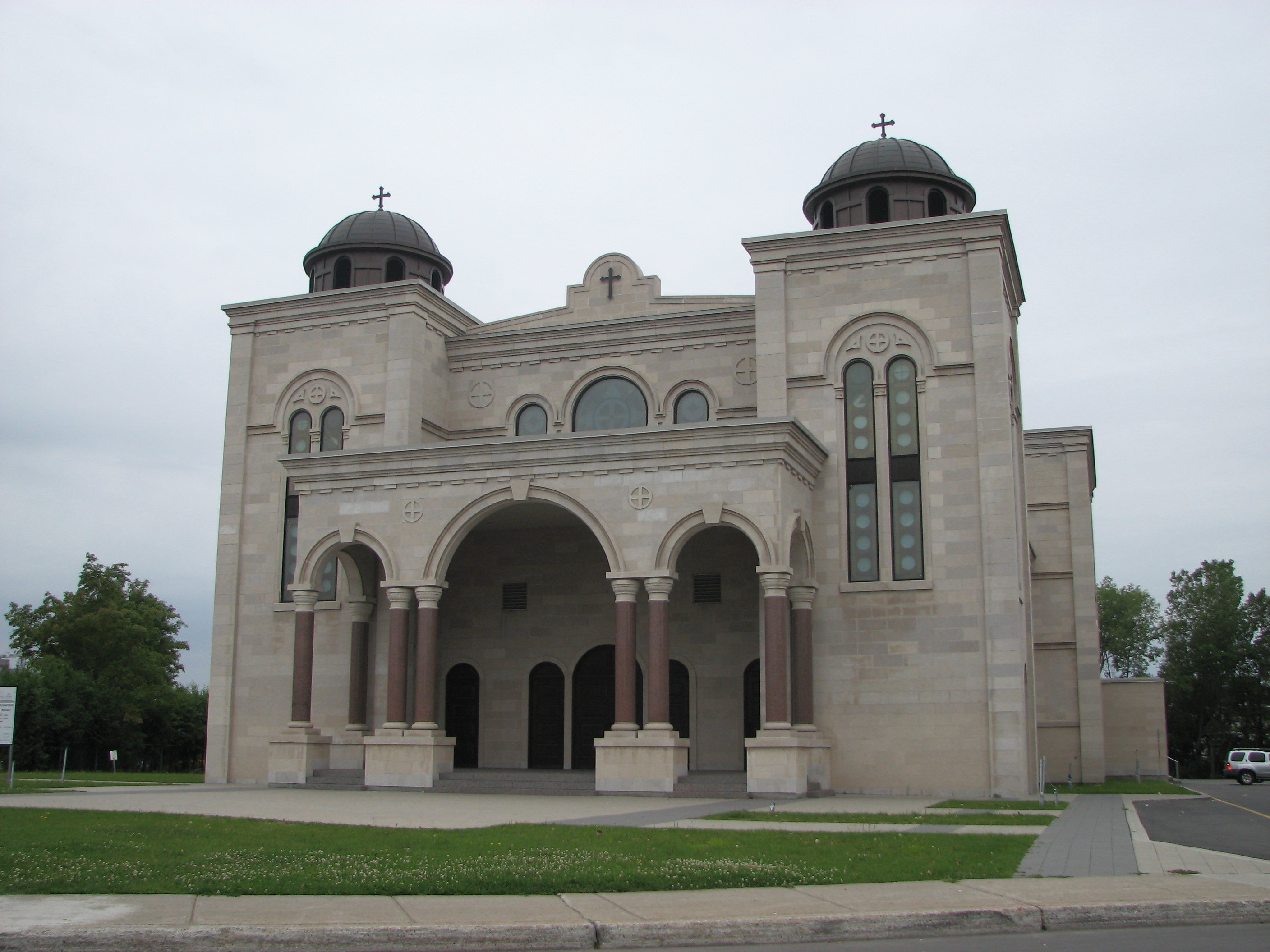
- Saint Sauveur Cathedral in Montreal

Location
- Country: Canada

Statistics
- Parishes: 14

Information
- Denomination: Melkite Greek Catholic Church
- Rite: Byzantine Rite
- Established: 1968 (as an exarchate); 1984 (as an eparchy)
- Cathedral: Saint Sauveur Cathedral

Current leadership
- Pope: Leo XIV
- Patriarch: Youssef Absi
- Eparch: Milad Jawish

Website
- melkite.ca

The Greek Melkite Catholic Eparchy of Canada, also known as the Melkite Eparchy of Canada or the Melkite Greek Catholic Eparchy of Saint-Sauveur of Montréal (Latin: Eparchia Sanctissimi Salvatoris Marianopolitansis Graecorum Melkitarum Catholicorum), is an eparchy of the Melkite Greek Catholic Church in Canada. It is based at Saint Sauveur Cathedral in Montreal, Quebec.

== Territory ==
The eparchy includes the faithful of the Melkite Greek Catholic Church in Canada. Its eparchial seat is the city of Montreal, where Saint Sauveur Cathedral is located. The name of the eparchy is derived from Saint-Sauveur (French for 'Holy Saviour').

As of 2020, the eparchy had around 40,000 baptized members, and it is divided into fourteen parishes.

== History ==
On April 9, 1968, Pope Paul VI founded the Apostolic Exarchate in Canada by the apostolic constitution Qui benignissimo. On October 13, 1980, Pope John Paul II issued a bull Qui benignissimo, which established the Apostolic Exarchate of the Saint-Sauveur. On September 1, 1984, Pope John Paul II issued a bull Beati Petri, which transformed the Apostolic Exarchate of the Saint-Sauveur into an eparchy.

== Communities ==
The eparchy has parishes in Montreal, Pierrefonds-Roxboro, Laval, Brossard, Quebec City, Ottawa, Toronto, Etobicoke-Mississauga, Hamilton, London, Windsor, Calgary, Edmonton and Vancouver.

It also includes the Canadian jurisdictions of two orders associated with the Melkite Greek Catholic Church – the Order of Saint Lazarus and the Canadian lieutenancy of the Patriarchal Order of the Holy Cross of Jerusalem.

== Ordinaries ==
Apostolic Exarch of Canada

- Michel Hakim, BS (13 October 1980 – 1 September 1984)

Bishops of Saint-Sauveur of Montréal

- Michel Hakim, BS (1 September 1984 – 30 June 1998),
- Sleiman Hajjar, BS (10 July 1998 – 10 March 2002)
- Ibrahim M. Ibrahim, BS (18 June 2003 – 26 June 2021)
- Milad Jawish, BS (18 September 2021 – present)
