= Wesley Corners, Ontario =

Wesley Corners
- Unincorporated community
- Interactive map of Wesley Corners
- Coordinates: 44°0′59″N 79°23′45″W
- Country: Canada
- Province: Ontario
- Regional municipality: York Region
- Town: Whitchurch–Stouffville
- Amalgamation: (With Village of Stouffville); 1 January 1971

Government
  - Type: Municipality
  - Mayor: Iain Lovatt
  - Councillor: Ken Ferdinands (Ward 1)
- Elevation: 300 m (980 ft)
- Time zone: UTC−5 (EST)
  - Summer (DST): UTC−4 (EDT)
- Forward sortation area: L4A
- Area codes: 905 and 289

Wesley Corners is a community situated in the Town of Whitchurch–Stouffville, Ontario, Canada.

The hamlet is located at the intersection of Woodbine Avenue (east of Highway 404) and York Regional Road 15/ Aurora Road. It was originally known as Hacking's Corners, after Rev. James Hacking who settled there in 1817. A Methodist Church was constructed of logs on the north-west corner in 1840; it was replaced by the current brick structure in 1881. The hamlet eventually became known as Wesley, in honour of the founder of the Methodist movement, John Wesley.

Today a service station and coffee shop are found on the south-west corner, and an auto repair shop on the south-east corner. Ducks Unlimited, a wetland and wildlife conservation organization, is on the north-east corner.
