= Vandorf, Ontario =

Vandorf
- Unincorporated community
- Interactive map of Vandorf
- Coordinates: 44°0′5″N 79°23′30″W
- Country: Canada
- Province: Ontario
- Regional municipality: York Region
- Town: Whitchurch–Stouffville
- Amalgamation: (With Town of Stouffville); 1 January 1971

Government
  - Type: Municipality
  - Mayor: Iain Lovatt
  - Councillor: Hugo T. Kroon (Ward 1)
- Elevation: 300 m (980 ft)
- Time zone: UTC−5 (EST)
  - Summer (DST): UTC−4 (EDT)
- Forward sortation area: L4A
- Area codes: 905 and 289
- NTS Map: 031D03
- GNBC Code: FCZNW

Vandorf is a hamlet located in the town of Whitchurch–Stouffville, Ontario, in Canada. It is the most westerly settlement within the Town of Whitchurch-Stouffville. With a population of approximately 722, Vandorf consists mainly of estate residential homes and farms.

== History ==
Vandorf was founded in the 19th century by the Van Nostrand family. The town was originally named "Brookvale", but the name had to be changed when postal service became available owing to a conflict with another Ontario community of the same name. A town meeting was held and the name Vandorf was selected by combining "Van" (from the founding Van Nostrands) with "Dorf", selected by the predominantly Dutch residents of the day and meaning "Village" in Dutch.

Prior to the arrival of Europeans, the area around Vandorf had a rich First Nation history, including a 17th-century Huron-Wendat ancestral village overlooking Van Nostrand Lake and the "Old Indian Fort" (or Aurora) site, located at the south-east corner of Kennedy Road and Vandorf Side Road. An important north–south trail (the "Vandorf Trail") led from the headwaters of the Rouge River to Newmarket and Holland Landing crossing the heights at Vandorf. "Perhaps the busiest and best documented of these routes was that which followed the Humber River valley northward ... although another trail of equal importance and antiquity and used earlier than the former by the French, extended from the mouth of the Rouge River northward to the headwaters of the Little Rouge and over the drainage divide to the East Branch of the Holland River at Holland Landing."

== Location and features ==
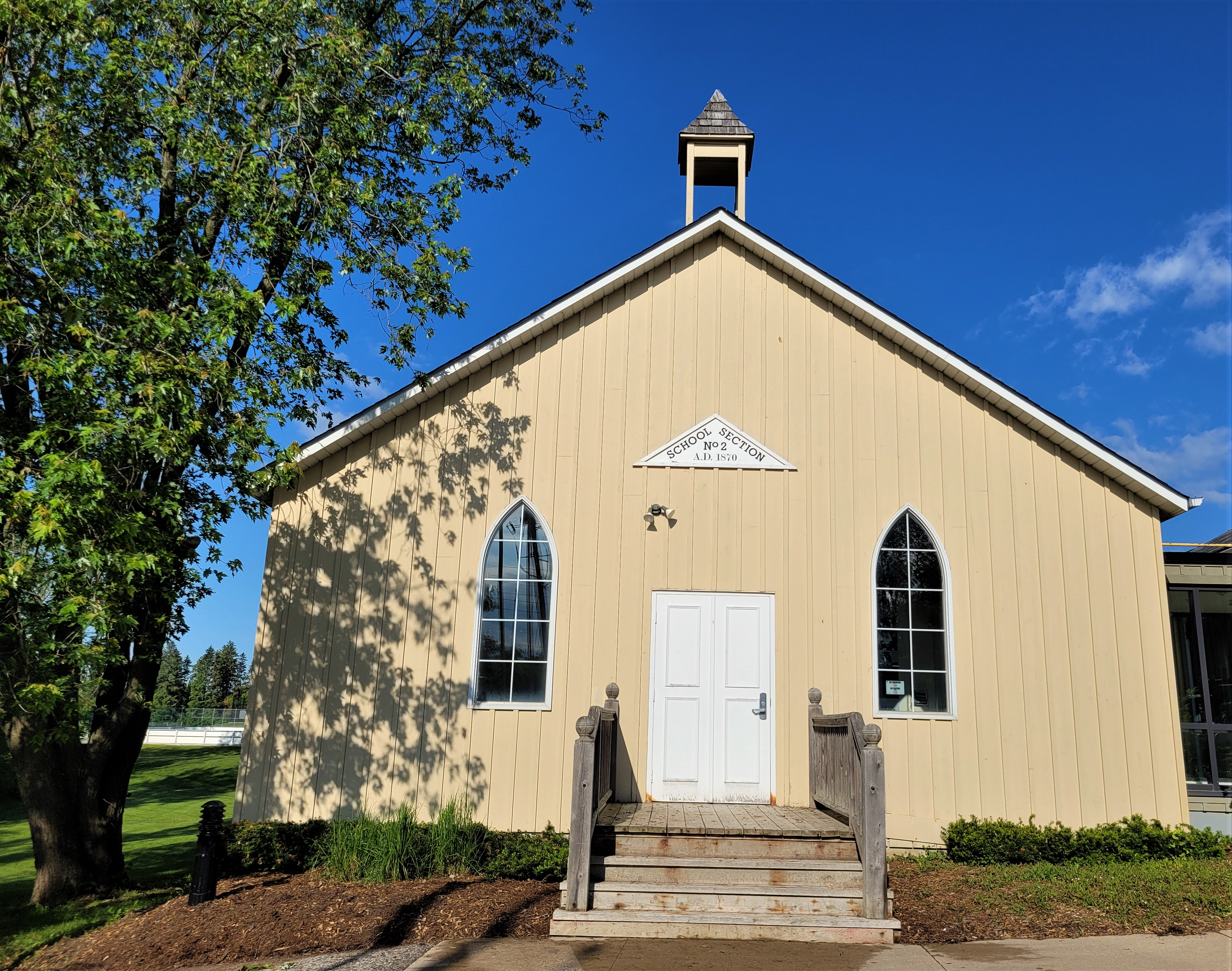
Vandorf Public School (1870), Whitchurch-Stouffville Museum and Community Centre

Downtown Vandorf is located on Woodbine Avenue, approximately 2 km north of Bloomington Road and just east of Highway 404, or via Vandorf Sideroad (2 km south of Aurora Road), which runs east–west starting at Industrial Parkway South in Aurora (westerly point) and ends at Highway 48 in Whitchurch–Stouffville (easterly point).

Vandorf has an auto repair shop, community hall and a gas station. The former Vandorf General Store stood for 132 years but was ordered closed by the York Region Board of Health in 2015 and subsequently demolished. The site has been sold and awaits redevelopment.

Vandorf is also home to the Vandorf Pylons, a noted senior level hockey team competing in hockey tournaments throughout the province. Villagers passionately support the team, and will often attend games at home and abroad.

The Whitchurch-Stouffville Museum & Community Centre is also located in Vandorf, part of Vandorf Park. The park is noted for hosting the Museum’s annual Antique and Classic Car Show, which is open to the general public. The show is typically held on the second Sunday in August.

For many years Vandorf Park hosted the annual Victoria Day Fireworks display held by the Town of Whitchurch-Stouffville. This large fireworks display once rivaled those shown at Ontario Place / Canada's Wonderland. The town re-located the fireworks event in 2010 to Stouffville due to safety concerns.

A rail line owned by Canadian National Railway runs through Vandorf; it is CN's primary freight corridor connecting Greater Toronto to Northern Ontario and Western Canada. This line is currently being considered for future GO Transit train service expansion with a station in Vandorf and Gormley (West). Future residential growth of Vandorf however is limited by provincial Greenbelt legislation. A railway bridge is located in Vandorf.

In 2024, the historic former Vandorf Community Hall is slated to reopen as Harmony Hall, a concert venue.
