= Preston Lake, Ontario =

Preston Lake
- community
- Interactive map of Preston Lake
- Coordinates: 43°59′14″N 79°22′35″W
- Country: Canada
- Province: Ontario
- Regional municipality: York Region
- Town: Whitchurch–Stouffville
- Amalgamation: 1 January 1971 (with Town of Stouffville)

Government
  - Type: Municipality
  - Mayor: Iain Lovatt
  - Councillor: Hugo Kroon (Ward 1)
- Elevation: 303 m (994 ft)
- Time zone: UTC−5 (EST)
  - Summer (DST): UTC−4 (EDT)
- Forward sortation area: L0H
- Area codes: 905 and 289
- NTS Map: 030M14
- GNBC Code: FCIKQ (community); FCIKR (lake)

Preston Lake is a community located in the town of Whitchurch–Stouffville in the Regional Municipality of York in Ontario, Canada. The community is centred on Preston Lake, a natural glacier kettle lake, immediately north-east of the intersection of Bloomington Road and Woodbine Avenue, east of Highway 404, near Aurora.

The Preston Lake community has approximately 700 residents divided into three distinct sub-communities: the North Shore, the Association of North Shore Ratepayers (private gated community); Preston Lake Beach Club on the west shore (luxury estate properties); and the Preston Lake South Shore Property Owners Association (upper middle-class). These three distinct homeowner's associations form the Pride & Preston Lake Community Association, a not-for-profit corporation, consisting of three elected directors (one from each residential shore - north, south, west), and an executive committee of volunteers, which includes a president, vice president, treasurer and secretary.

== Geography ==
- Lake depth: approx. 26 ft (7.9 m) at deepest point
- Area: approx. 280,000 m^{2} open water (approx 70 acres)

Preston Lake is home to numerous fish species, including largemouth bass, yellow perch, brown bullhead (catfish), and pumpkinseed (sunfish). The Ontario record for largemouth bass was caught by Mario Crysanthou of North York, Ontario in Preston Lake in August 1976; the fish weighed 10.43 pounds, and was 22 inches (560 mm) in length with a girth of 19.5 inches (500 mm).

Thanks mainly in part to the preservation of the lake by its residents (Lake Management Plan/Homeowner's Guide) and a town by-law that prohibits the use of gasoline powered motorboats, the water of Preston Lake remains extremely clean and teeming with wildlife. Shoreline restoration funding is granted regularly by the Toronto and Region Conservation Authority. Further land use is now tightly restricted by the Oak Ridges Moraine Conservation Act.

Preston Lake (South Shore), with view to North Shore community

Use of the lake and its shorelines is regulated by the Department of Fisheries and Oceans Canada in conjunction with the Toronto and Region Conservation Authority (including some funding for shoreline restoration); the Ministry of Natural Resources governs fishing regulations, town by-laws prohibit the use of power boats on the lake, and laws are enforced by the York Regional Police Marine Unit. While the resources of all levels of government are used for the regulation, protection and preservation of the lake, the entire perimeter of the lake is currently in private hands, and the homeowners in the sub-communities alone benefit from exclusive access rights to one of Whitchurch–Stouffville's most significant natural and recreational assets. It remains one of the premiere communities in all of southern Ontario.

== History ==
Archaic native artifacts more than 3,000 years old have been found around Preston Lake. The native Seneca (Iroquois) people had a settlement near Preston Lake from 1500 to 1650 A.D.

In 1802, Frederic Baron de Hoen was granted 2,600 acres (11 km^{2}) in Whitchurch Township around the lake, owning lots 10 and 11, concession 4. He received the grants as a Hessian soldier for service with the British Army in the American War of Independence. Through the years a story was handed down that he sold 400 acres (1.6 km^{2}) of land for the cost of a horse and saddle to Peter Reesor, a Pennsylvania Dutch settler who registered the land in 1805. Reesor's family and fellow Pennsylvanians began settling the area in 1803, continuing with other Mennonite families (the Tauns and Brillingers) between 1850 and 1900, and the lake was then known as Reesor Lake.

Reesor Lake became Middleton Lake after the Middletons bought the land from the Reesors at the turn of the century. In 1920, the Middletons sold their land to George and Annie Preston who developed the lakeshore as a summer tourist resort in the early 1920s. In 1915, Preston built a large, red brick, eleven-room farmhouse to the north of lot 13 which still stood as of 2008. In 1923, the residence became the first in the area to have electricity, powered by a Delco generator in the basement. Preston's entrepreneurial spirit saw him and his family living in the basement as he used the home for hotel guests during the summers of the 1920s, and since the lane to his house was the only access to the lake, he charged a toll fee of 25 cents for cars and 10 cents for horses and carriages to use the lane for lake access.

On 29 August 1930, Plan 232 was approved by Whitchurch Township, and Preston hired engineers and surveyors to begin development of the north side of the lake. Considering that the first condominium law passed in the United States was in the Commonwealth of Puerto Rico in 1958, his idea for a private community of home owners, controlled by the association of owners that jointly represent ownership of the whole area, was visionary for the time.

Preston created one public and one private beach, installed a wharf and diving facilities and stocked the lake with bass for fishing. In 1955, the lake was painted by the Group of Seven artist A. J. Casson. The painting was of the Hennessy homestead, which still stands on the west side of Woodbine Avenue.

At least since 1998, the north shore community of Preston Lake (Preston Lake Country Club) has been divided and unable to agree on a funding formula and strategy for the maintenance of their commonly held, private road network. The club has become dependent on the larger town to facilitate discussions on the maintenance of the club's own internal road network, to provide an annual grant for road maintenance, for liability insurance to cover Preston North Shores Roads Committee (including sub-committees for the maintenance of a private beach), and since 2004, to collect maintenance fees for the private roads through realty taxes. Grants from other levels of government have also been sought. Despite the larger town's assistance in the maintenance of the club's road network and lake access route, the roads remain private property, and citizens outside the Preston Lake Country Club have no legal access to the lake from the beach-front road.

Preston Lake Beach Club (West Shore), with exclusive access to the lake

The south shore of the lake saw cottage development begin in the 1950s, and a trailer park emerge on the west shore in the 1970s. In the 1990s, Landford Preston Lake Limited purchased the west shore property, removed the trailer park and built an estate subdivision in its place with 1-acre (4,000 m^{2}) lots (Preston Lake Estates); the town of Whitchurch-Stouffville assumed the streets of the west shore in 1997, while allowing the private Preston Lake Beach Club exclusive access to the lake in its subdivision.

On the south shore there is one small lakefront park to which local residents alone have deeded access.

Until the 1970s, Preston Lake had a public beach accessible for a small day-fee. When the beach and trailer park on the west shore were purchased by for estate property development in the 1990s, the town of Whitchurch–Stouffville failed to ensure and protect public access to its own lake. Today, despite the investment of significant funding and/or oversight of all levels of government, the lake is completely surrounded by private property and access is restricted to fewer than 700 people. The new Vandorf-Preston Lake Secondary plan proposed a trail system that would give public access to the lake; this met with significant opposition by residents who enjoy exclusive access to the lake.
