= Saint Sauveur Cathedral =

Melkite Greek Catholic cathedral in Canada

- Saint Sauveur Melkite Greek Catholic Cathedral
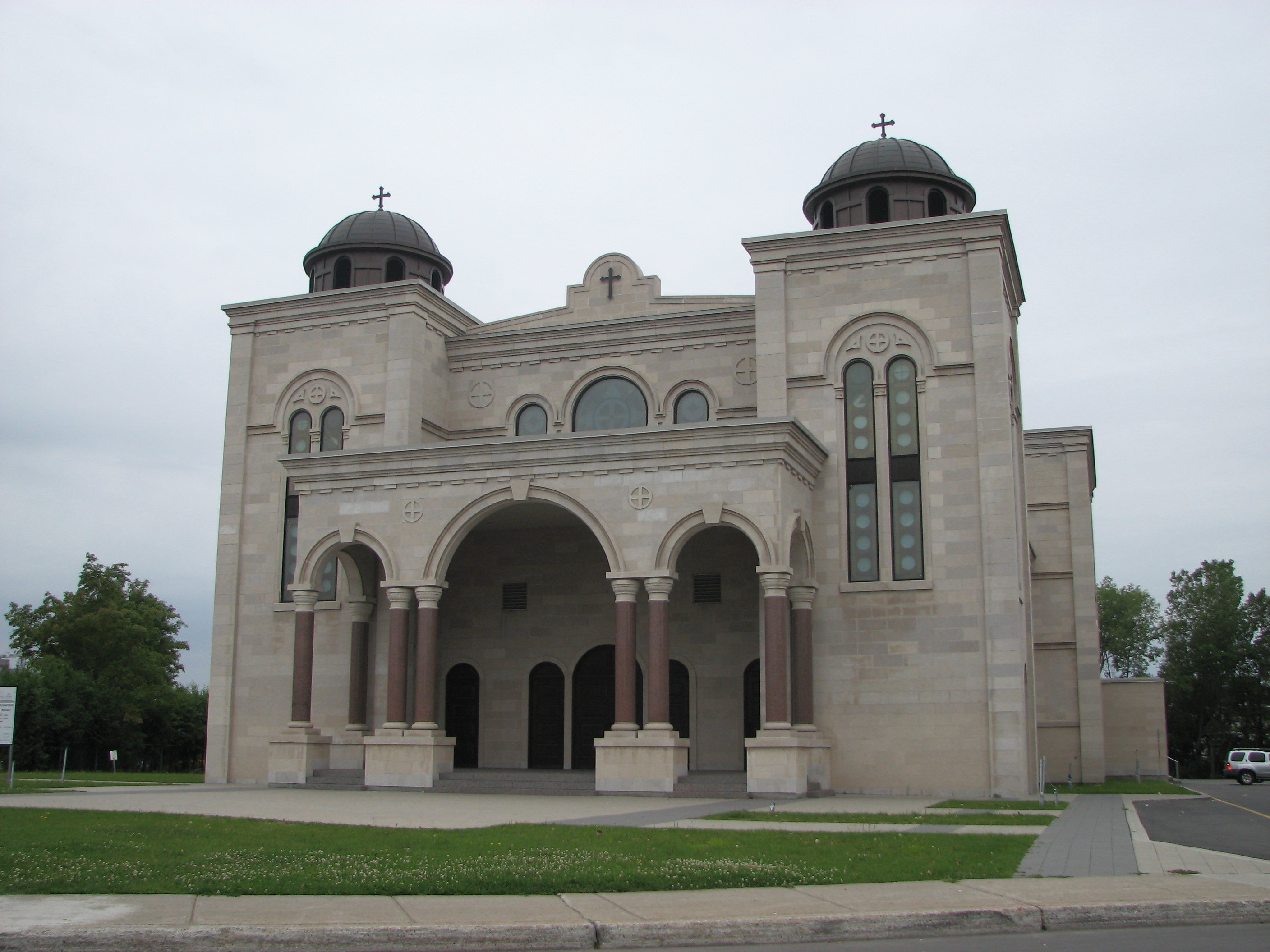

- Location within Montreal
- 45°32′6.31″N 73°40′18.58″W
- Location: 10025 boulevard de l'Acadie; Montreal, Quebec, Canada
- Denomination: Catholic Church
- Sui iuris church: Melkite Greek Catholic Church

History
- Dedication: Saint Sauveur (French for 'Holy Saviour')

Architecture
- Style: Byzantine Revival
- Groundbreaking: 2006
- Completed: 2007

Specifications
- Capacity: 746

Administration
- Diocese: Eparchy of Saint-Sauveur of Montréal

Clergy
- Bishop: Milad Jawish

Saint Sauveur Melkite Greek Catholic Cathedral is a Melkite Greek Catholic cathedral in Montreal, Quebec, Canada. It is located at 10025 boulevard de l'Acadie in the borough of Ahuntsic-Cartierville. It serves as the eparchial seat of the Melkite Eparchy of Canada. It was founded by the Lebanese Melkite Christian community of Montreal.

The building was designed by Gagnier et Villeneuve Architectes, with construction starting in 2006 and ending in 2007. It was dedicated on October 28, 2007. The cathedral has a capacity of 746 people.
