= List of shipwrecks in 1967 =

The list of shipwrecks in 1967 includes ships sunk, foundered, grounded, or otherwise lost during 1967.

table of contents
1967
Jan	Feb	Mar	Apr
May	Jun	Jul	Aug
Sep	Oct	Nov	Dec
Unknown date

== January ==
=== 1 January ===
List of shipwrecks: 1 January 1967
Ship	State	Description
Refrigerator 10	Soviet Union	The refrigerated cargo ship sank in the Bering Strait 35 nautical miles (65 km) north of Unimak Island in the Aleutian Islands with the loss of five of her 79 crew.

=== 2 January ===
List of shipwrecks: 2 January 1967
Ship	State	Description
Bjorn Lohse	West Germany	The ship caught fire at Lisbon and was declared a constructive total loss. The ship was scrapped in March 1967.
Filia	Greece	The Liberty ship collided with Tayga (France) off Mokha, Federation of South Arabia and was beached. She was declared a constructive total loss.

=== 4 January ===
List of shipwrecks: 4 January 1967
Ship	State	Description
Bluebird	United Kingdom	The hydroplane crashed on Coniston Water during an attempt on the world water speed record, killing its pilot, Donald Campbell.

=== 8 January ===
List of shipwrecks: 8 January 1967
Ship	State	Description
San Roberto	Panama	The cargo ship collided with Emelia Rosella (Philippines) off Japan (33°25′N 136°40′E) and became disabled. She was towed in to Tokyo, Japan on 13 January. Repairs were deemed uneconomic and she was consequently scrapped.

=== 9 January ===
List of shipwrecks: 9 January 1967
Ship	State	Description
HMS Amphion	Royal Navy	The Amphion-class submarine collided with Timbarra (Australia), sustaining slight damage.
Jamaica Bay	United States	The dredger was mined by the Viet Cong and sank in the Mekong River, 45 nautical miles (83 km) north of Saigon, Vietnam.
V O	United States	The 126-foot (38.4 m) crab fishing vessel disappeared during a voyage from Seattle, Washington, to King Cove, Alaska, with the loss of her entire crew of five. The bodies of two crew members were found in a life raft 26 nautical miles (48 km; 30 mi) east-southeast of Marmot Island and 50 miles (80 km) northeast of Kodiak, Alaska.

=== 10 January ===
List of shipwrecks: 10 January 1967
Ship	State	Description
Parmarina	Lebanon	The cargo ship was wrecked in the South China Sea off Keelung, Taiwan (25°10′N 121°43′E).

=== 11 January ===
List of shipwrecks: 11 January 1967
Ship	State	Description
Audacity	United Kingdom	The coastal tanker ran aground near the Terschelling Bank Light Vessel (Netherlands). Refloated on 21 January, repaired and returned to service.

=== 13 January ===
List of shipwrecks: 13 January 1967
Ship	State	Description
Nelson B	Canada	The sailing ship struck a submerged object at 44°00′N 66°18′W and sank.

=== 15 January ===
List of shipwrecks: 15 January 1967
Ship	State	Description
Rosa Anna	Philippines	The cargo ship was driven ashore on Sibulan Island. She was refloated and towed to Hong Kong, where she was declared a constructive total loss. Consequently scrapped.

=== 17 January ===
List of shipwrecks: 17 January 1967
Ship	State	Description
Elias K	Greece	The cargo ship ran aground in the Farasan Islands (16°23′N 41°48′E). Refloated on 24 January. Subsequently declared a constructive total loss and scrapped in December 1967.

=== 19 January ===
List of shipwrecks: 19 January 1967
Ship	State	Description
Dangpo	Republic of Korea Navy	The Noryang-class patrol ship was shelled by North Korean coastal artillery batteries, and possibly bombed by North Korean Air Force MiG-21 aircraft, and sunk, with 39 of her crewmen killed.

=== 21 January ===
List of shipwrecks: 21 January 1967
Ship	State	Description
Jacob Verolme	Netherlands	The bulk ore carrier exploded and sank 120 nautical miles (220 km) off Las Palmas, Canary Islands, Spain with the loss of one of her 48 crew.

=== 23 January ===
List of shipwrecks: 23 January 1967
Ship	State	Description
Constantia S	United Kingdom	The tanker was carrying fresh water en route to Gibraltar when she struck the Les Casquets reef in a storm, all crew were rescued, the ship broke her back. Ten of her 31 crew were rescued by Sarnia (United Kingdom). The other twenty and the ship's dog were rescued by Burhoe ( Trinity House ). Her captain was rescued by a French helicopter.

=== 25 January ===
List of shipwrecks: 25 January 1967
Ship	State	Description
Pafco No. 12	United States	The motor vessel was destroyed by fire at Kodiak, Alaska.

=== Unknown date ===
List of shipwrecks: Unknown date 1967
Ship	State	Description
Sir Winston Churchill	United Kingdom	The schooner sank at Southampton, Hampshire. Later pumped out, refloated and returned to service.

== February ==
=== 4 February ===
List of shipwrecks: 4 February 1967
Ship	State	Description
Ionic Crest	Panama	The Liberty ship suffered a hull fracture whilst on a voyage from Mormugao, India to a Japanese port. She was consequently scrapped.
Kyle	Canada	The icebreaker and former ferry broke from its moorings at Harbour Grace, Newfoundland during a storm and ran aground deep within the harbour. The ship was never salvaged and remains in place.

=== 6 February ===
List of shipwrecks: 6 February 1967
Ship	State	Description
Astronaut	United States	The 77-gross register ton, 59.3-foot (18.1 m) fishing vessel was wrecked on the coast of Akutan Island in the Aleutian Islands. Her four crewmen reached shore and survived. Two skiffs – one each from the vessels Honey B and Menshikov (both United States) – were wrecked trying to reach them; all four crewmen aboard the skiffs survived and joined Astronaut's four crewmen on the beach. The fishing vessel American Star (United States) rescued four of them, and later the seagoing buoy tender USCGC Citrus ( United States Coast Guard) rescued the other four.
Medina	United States	The motor vessel sank 0.25 nautical miles (0.5 km; 0.3 mi) off Spruce Cape (57°49′15″N 152°20′00″W) northeast of Kodiak, Alaska.

=== 16 February ===
List of shipwrecks: 16 February 1967
Ship	State	Description
Nikolis M	Greece	The Liberty ship ran aground in the Catalina Shallow, off Isabela de Sagua, Cuba. (23°00′N 73°58′W). She was refloated on 23 February and put in to Isabela de Sagua. She was declared a compromised total loss.

=== 17 February ===
List of shipwrecks: 17 February 1967
Ship	State	Description
Bar	Yugoslavia	The Liberty ship ran aground off Split. Declared a constructive total loss, she was scrapped in situ.
Ponderosa	Liberia	The Liberty ship ran aground on Topar Island, Chile. She was refloated and beached in Molyneux Bay. Declared a constructive total loss, she was refloated in May and sold.

=== 21 February ===
List of shipwrecks: 21 February 1967
Ship	State	Description
Cape Bonnie	Canada	The coaster ran aground at 44°26′N 63°42′W and was wrecked.

=== 23 February ===
List of shipwrecks: 23 February 1967
Ship	State	Description
Valiant Enterprise	United States	The abandoned and derelict Liberty ship was allowed to sink off Colombo, Ceylon.

=== 24 February ===
List of shipwrecks: 24 February 1967
Ship	State	Description
Cristobal	Panama	The T1 tanker sprang a leak and sank in the Gulf of Suez.

=== 27 February ===
List of shipwrecks: 27 February 1967
Ship	State	Description
Farringford	United Kingdom	The passenger ferry ran aground at Lymington, Hampshire during a gale. Later refloated and returned to service.

=== 28 February ===
List of shipwrecks: 28 February 1967
Ship	State	Description
Tukan	Soviet Union	The factory ship foundered 15 nautical miles (28 km) north of Hanstholm, Denmark with the loss of 57 of her 79 crew.

=== Unknown date ===
List of shipwrecks: Unknown date 1967
Ship	State	Description
Anesis	Greece	The cargo ship ran aground 45 nautical miles (83 km) east of Lagos, Nigeria. She was abandoned as a total loss.
Benjamin Gelcer	Union of South Africa	The stripped, out of service trawler, a sold off Fish-class trawler, was scuttled off Cape Town, South Africa.
Roma Um	Argentina	The vessel caught fire and was beached at Belém, Brazil.

== March ==
=== 8 March ===
List of shipwrecks: 8 March 1967
Ship	State	Description
Laura Scotti	Italy	The ship capsized and aground off Caparica, Portugal.

=== 11 March ===
List of shipwrecks: 11 March 1967
Ship	State	Description
Mount Atho	Liberia	The Liberty ship ran aground off the Rio Grande do Sul, Brazil (30°31′S 50°20′W). She was on a voyage from Tampa, Florida, United States to Porto Alegre, Brazil. She was declared a compromised total loss.

=== 12 March ===
List of shipwrecks: 12 March 1967
Ship	State	Description
Balmoral	Liberia	The collier ran aground in the Weser Estuary, West Germany. She broke in two on 5 April, a total loss.
Dias	Liberia	The cargo ship caught fire off the south coast of Portugal. Her crew were rescued. Dias exploded and sank 60 nautical miles (110 km) off Cape St. Vincent (36°39′N 8°03′W). She was on a voyage from Bremen, West Germany to Civitavecchia, Italy.>

=== 14 March ===
List of shipwrecks: 14 March 1967
Ship	State	Description
Kolno	Poland	Collided with Østbornholm (Denmark) in the Odense River.

=== 15 March ===
List of shipwrecks: 15 March 1967
Ship	State	Description
C-43A	Vietnam People's Navy	Vietnam War: The blockade runner was scuttled to prevent capture after being heavily damaged by U.S. ships.

=== 17 March ===
List of shipwrecks: 17 March 1967
Ship	State	Description
Scenic	United States	The 14-gross register ton, 38-foot (11.6 m) fishing vessel was destroyed by a storm in the Gulf of Alaska off the Barren Islands (58°57′N 152°15′W) off the south-central coast of Alaska.

=== 18 March ===
List of shipwrecks: 18 March 1967
Ship	State	Description
Torrey Canyon	United Kingdom	The Suezmax type oil tanker ran aground on Pollard's Rock in the Seven Stones reef between the Cornish mainland and the Isles of Scilly, loaded with 120,000 tonnes of crude oil. The vessel released 32 million gallons of oil, much of which washed up on the Cornish coast.

=== 20 March ===
List of shipwrecks: 20 March 1967
Ship	State	Description
Labuan Bay	Panama	The cargo ship ran aground on Bancoran Island, Borneo and caught fire. Refloated 24 March and towed to Manila, Philippines. After a further fire on 11 July, the ship was scrapped in November 1967.

=== 22 March ===
List of shipwrecks: 22 March 1967
Ship	State	Description
Lapwing	United Kingdom	The coaster collided with Carpathia (West Germany) in the River Thames and was beached near Northfleet, Kent. Lapwing was on a voyage from Felixtowe, Suffolk to Deptford, London. She was declared a constructive total loss and was consequently scrapped.

=== 23 March ===
List of shipwrecks: 23 March 1967
Ship	State	Description
Nan B	United States	The 43-gross register ton, 60.6-foot (18.5 m) motor cargo vessel sank in Eliza Harbor (57°09′N 134°17′W) in Southeast Alaska.

=== 24 March ===
List of shipwrecks: 24 March 1967
Ship	State	Description
Myalls	Canada	The coaster caught fire and sank off Shelburne Harbour.

=== 27 March ===
List of shipwrecks: 27 March 1967
Ship	State	Description
Panteleimon	Greece	The Liberty ship was driven ashore at Kobe, Japan. She was declared a constructive total loss and scrapped.

=== 29 March ===
List of shipwrecks: 29 March 1967
Ship	State	Description
Aleutian Reefer	United States	The 252-gross register ton, 125.5-foot (38.3 m) fishing vessel was destroyed by fire at Homer, Alaska.
H & S No. 5	United States	The 198-gross register ton, 90.5-foot (27.6 m) barge sank in Whitewater Bay (57°15′N 134°37′W) on the southwest coast of Admiralty Island in the Alexander Archipelago in Southeast Alaska.

=== 31 March ===
List of shipwrecks: 31 March 1967
Ship	State	Description
Christos	Liberia	The cargo ship ran aground on Kandeliusa Island, off Kos, Greece. She was on a voyage from Constanţa, Romania to Hodeidah, Federation of South Arabia. She was refloated and resumed her voyage, but sank in the Aegean Sea north of Cyprus (36°32′N 26°57′E) the next day.

== April ==
=== 11 April ===
List of shipwrecks: 11 April 1967
Ship	State	Description
USS Walter X. Young	United States Navy	The decommissioned Crosley-class high speed transport was sunk as a target during missile-firing tests.

=== 16 April ===
List of shipwrecks: 16 April 1967
Ship	State	Description
San Toy	United States	The 10-gross register ton, 29.5-foot (9.0 m) fishing vessel sank in Chomley Sound (55°17′N 132°04′W) in Southeast Alaska.

=== 18 April ===
List of shipwrecks: 18 April 1967
Ship	State	Description
Christitsa	Greece	The Liberty ship collided with Citta di Beirut (Italy) off Knyossoura and was beached. She was declared a constructive total loss.

=== 19 April ===
List of shipwrecks: 19 April 1967
Ship	State	Description
Ever Blessing	Liberia	The Liberty ship ran aground off Jeju Island, South Korea and was severely damaged. She was on a voyage from Inchon. South Korea to Keelung, Taiwan. She was refloated on 22 April. Subsequently scrapped

=== 28 April ===
List of shipwrecks: 28 April 1967
Ship	State	Description
Costa Rican Trader	Liberia	The cargo ship ran aground in Halibut Bay, Halifax, Nova Scotia Canada and was wrecked.

=== Unknown date ===
List of shipwrecks: Unknown date in April 1967
Ship	State	Description
William H. McGuffey	United States	The Liberty ship was sunk as a breakwater at Nikishka, Alaska.

== May ==
=== 4 May ===
List of shipwrecks: 4 May 1967
Ship	State	Description
Donghae	South Korea	The Liberty ship ran aground in the Inland Sea of Japan. She was refloated but declared a constructive total loss.

=== 6 May ===
List of shipwrecks: 6 May 1967
Ship	State	Description
South Wind	United States	The tug capsized in Cook Inlet on the south-central coast of Alaska after she struck the mooring line of the barge she was towing. The buoy tender USCGC Sorrel ( United States Coast Guard) rescued her entire crew of three.

=== 12 May ===
List of shipwrecks: 12 May 1967
Ship	State	Description
Horizon	South Africa	The coaster was wrecked 5 nautical miles (9.3 km) north west of Port St. Johns.

=== 16 May ===
List of shipwrecks: 16 May 1967
Ship	State	Description
Nira	United States	The 9-gross register ton, 32.4-foot (9.9 m) fishing vessel sank after striking a submerged object in Southeast Alaska. The wreck report stated that the accident took place south of Ketchikan, Alaska, in Wrangell Narrows, but Wrangell Narrows lies north of Ketchikan, calling into question the exact location of Nira's sinking.

=== 19 May ===
List of shipwrecks: 19 May 1967
Ship	State	Description
Despina K	Lebanon	The Liberty ship ran aground off the coast of Mexico (24°52′N 112°16′W) and broke in two, a total loss.

=== 23 May ===
List of shipwrecks: 23 May 1967
Ship	State	Description
Archon Raphael	Panama	The Liberty ship ran aground off Musha Island, Djibouti (11°44′N 43°11′E) whilst on a voyage from Sunderland, County Durham, United Kingdom to Shanghai, China. She was refloated on 17 June and towed in to Djibouti.

=== 24 May ===
List of shipwrecks: 24 May 1967
Ship	State	Description
Renmore	United States	The motor vessel was destroyed by fire at Seldovia, Alaska.

=== 25 May ===
List of shipwrecks: 25 May 1967
Ship	State	Description
Archon Raphael	Panama	The Liberty ship ran aground near Djibouti City. Later refloated and towed to Djibouti City.

=== Unknown date ===
List of shipwrecks: Unknown date in May 1967
Ship	State	Description
Circe	Liberia	The tanker exploded in the Mediterranean Sea off the south coast of France and broke in two with the loss of all but one of the 39 people on board. The survivor was rescued by the aircraft carrier Arromanches (French Navy). The bow section was sunk by a French warship. The stern section was taken in tow by a tug.

== June ==
=== 2 June ===
List of shipwrecks: 2 June 1967
Ship	State	Description
Essberger Chemist	West Germany	The chemical tanker exploded and caught fire 250 nautical miles (460 km) south of the Azores, Portugal. All 40 crew rescued by an American ship.

=== 5 June ===
List of shipwrecks: 5 June 1967
Ship	State	Description
HMSAS Bloemfontein	South African Navy	The decommissioned Algerine-class minesweeper was sunk as a target in False Bay off the coast of South Africa by the frigate President Kruger and the minesweeper SAS Johannesburg (both South African Navy).
Observer	United States	Six-Day War: The T2 tanker was trapped in Lake Timsah due to an engine breakdown and the war. She was abandoned as a compromised constructive total loss.
Unknown Egyptian barge	Egypt	Six-Day War: The barge was sunk with explosives by Israeli frogmen at Alexandria, Egypt.
Unknown Egyptian dredger	Egypt	Six-Day War: The dredger was sunk with explosives by Israeli frogmen at Alexandria, Egypt.

=== 6 June ===
List of shipwrecks: 6 June 1967
Ship	State	Description
Vassil Levsky	Bulgaria	Six-Day War: The cargo ship anchored in the Great Bitter Lake. Not released until June 1975, she was consequently scrapped.
Unknown Egyptian motor torpedo boat	United Arab Republic Navy	Six-Day War: The Project 205 motor torpedo boat ran aground in a fight with Israeli Navy vessels. Later refloated.
Two unknown Hazir-class submersibles	Israeli Navy	Six-Day War: Two Hazir-class submersibles were scuttled off Port Said, Egypt.

=== 7 June ===
List of shipwrecks: 7 June 1967
Ship	State	Description
Mecca	Egypt	Six-Day War: The cargo ship was scuttled in the Suez Canal at Km 7 as a block ship. The wreck was cleared in 1975 to enable the canal to be re-opened.

=== 8 June ===
List of shipwrecks: 8 June 1967
Ship	State	Description
Magd	United Arab Republic	Six-Day War: The Intermediate-type tanker was bombed and sunk in the Suez Canal by Israeli Air Force aircraft. Wreck cleared in 1975 to enable the canal to be re-opened.
USS Liberty	United States Navy	USS Liberty Six-Day War: The Belmont-class technical research ship was attacked by Israeli Air Force aircraft and Israeli Navy torpedo boats in the Mediterranean Sea north of the Sinai Peninsula, Egypt. She was declared a constructive total loss and was consequently scrapped.

=== 9 June ===
List of shipwrecks: 9 June 1967
Ship	State	Description
Free Merchant	Cyprus	The cargo ship sprang a leak in the Indian Ocean 700 nautical miles (1,300 km) off Colombo, Ceylon and was abandoned by her crew. She broke in two, then sank the next day (9°14′N 68°11′E). She was on a voyage from Beirut, Lebanon to Yokohama, Japan.
Northern Venture	Panama	The cargo ship ran aground off South Adaga Shima, Okinawa, Japan. She was on a voyage from Tsukumi, Japan to Manila, Philippines. She broke in two and was declared a constructive total loss.

=== 10 June ===
List of shipwrecks: 10 June 1967
Ship	State	Description
Irini	Greece	The Liberty ship collided with Russell H. Green (Liberia) off Cape Spartel, Spain. She was declared a constructive total loss.
Winsome	Hong Kong	The cargo ship caught fire south east of Hainan Island, China and was abandoned by her crew. She was on a voyage from Kaohsiung, Taiwan to Bangkok, Thailand. She sank the next day in the South China Sea (16°45′N 116°45′E).

=== 11 June ===
List of shipwrecks: 11 June 1967
Ship	State	Description
Falcon	United States	The 7-gross register ton, 30.2-foot (9.2 m) fishing vessel sank in the harbor at Meyers Chuck in Ketchikan, Alaska.

=== 12 June ===
List of shipwrecks: 12 June 1967
Ship	State	Description
Demetrios	Liberia	The Liberty ship sprang a leak and sank off Diego Suarez, Madagascar (9°20′S 48°30′E). She was on a voyage from Bombay to a Polish port.

=== 14 June ===
List of shipwrecks: 14 June 1967
Ship	State	Description
Ever Blessing	Liberia	The Liberty ship ran aground near Inchon, South Korea (33°21′N 126°11′E). She was refloated and towed to Kure, Japan where she was declared a constructive total loss.
Mparmpamarcos	Liberia	The Liberty ship collided with the tanker Gem-Pet (Liberia) in the Shimonoseki Strait. She was declared a constructive total loss and scrapped.
Nictric	Lebanon	The Liberty ship caught fire at Chittagong, East Pakistan. She was declared a constructive total loss.

=== 15 June ===
List of shipwrecks: 15 June 1967
Ship	State	Description
Marcar	Liberia	The Liberty ship sprang a leak and was beached at Tarrafal, Cape Verde Islands. Later refloated and towed to Saint Vincent where she sank in 1968.
Solar	United States	The motor vessel was destroyed by a storm in Anchorage Bay (56°19′N 158°23′W) west of Chignik, Alaska.

=== 16 June ===
List of shipwrecks: 16 June 1967
Ship	State	Description
Corporal Eric C. Gibson	United States	The Liberty ship was scuttled in the Atlantic Ocean (39°37′N 70°57′W) with a cargo of obsolete military equipment.
Michiko	Liberia	The Liberty ship ran aground near Algeciras, Spain. She was later refloated but declared a constructive total loss and scrapped.
Syra	Greece	The Liberty ship ran aground at Punta del Frei, Spain. She was on a voyage from Gela, Sicily, Italy to Puerto Caballo, Spain. She was refloated and towed in to Algeciras, then to Cartagena, Spain. Declared a constructive total loss and scrapped.

=== 17 June ===
List of shipwrecks: 17 June 1967
Ship	State	Description
P G No. 7	United States	The 8-gross register ton, 28.6-foot (8.7 m) fishing vessel was destroyed by fire at King Cove, Alaska.
Pearl of Victory	Panama	The cargo ship was wrecked on a reef in the Red Sea.

=== 19 June ===
List of shipwrecks: 19 June 1967
Ship	State	Description
Farwest	United States	The motor vessel sank at the Copper River on the south-central coast of Alaska southeast of Cordova.
Hanhungho	South Korea	The fishing vessel was damaged during an attempt to capture by North Korea. Sank later while under tow. One crewman killed, two wounded.

=== 23 June ===
List of shipwrecks: 23 June 1967
Ship	State	Description
Meldon	United States	The 42-gross register ton, 53-foot (16.2 m) fishing vessel was wrecked on the coast of Long Island in Alaska. The wreck report does not specify which of a number of islands in Alaska named Long Island the incident occurred on.
Thimar S	Liberia	The Liberty ship ran aground at Soehi Besar, Sarawak, Malaysia (2°58′N 108°40′E). She was on a voyage from Mormugao, India to a Japanese port. She was a total loss.

=== 24 June ===
List of shipwrecks: 24 June 1967
Ship	State	Description
Essberger Chemist	West Germany	The chemical tanker was torpedoed by HMS Dreadnought (Royal Navy) and finished off by shelling from HMS Salisbury (Royal Navy) at the request of her owners.

=== 26 June ===
List of shipwrecks: 26 June 1967
Ship	State	Description
Roscoe II	United States	The 13-gross register ton, 30.9-foot (9.4 m) fishing vessel was lost after striking an unidentified obstruction 2 nautical miles (3.7 km; 2.3 mi) off Unga Rock off the coast of Unga Island in the Gulf of Alaska.

=== Unknown date ===
List of shipwrecks: Unknown date in June 1967
Ship	State	Description
Mecca	United Arab Republic	Six-Day War: The passenger ship was scuttled in the Suez Canal. The wreck was scrapped in September 1974.
Port Launceston	United Kingdom	Six-Day War: The cargo ship was trapped in the Suez Canal. Declared a constructive total loss on 19 February 1969. Subsequently sold and returned to service.

== July ==
=== 1 July ===
List of shipwrecks: 1 July 1967
Ship	State	Description
Lefteric	Liberia	The Liberty ship ran aground, broke in two and sank at Mormugao, India.
Unknown Israeli assault boat	Israeli Navy	War of Attrition: The armed Bertram-built cabin cruiser was sunk by ground fire in/near the Suez Canal.

=== 3 July ===
List of shipwrecks: 3 July 1967
Ship	State	Description
Kelly B	United States	The 14-gross register ton, 32.2-foot (9.8 m) fishing vessel was lost after striking a rock in Crab Bay (57°08′30″N 135°33′40″W) in Prince William Sound on the south-central coast of Alaska.

=== 5 July ===
List of shipwrecks: 5 July 1967
Ship	State	Description
Conchita	Liberia	The Liberty ship sprang a leak and foundered in the Indian Ocean (6°20′S 50°27′E).

=== 6 July ===
List of shipwrecks: 6 July 1967
Ship	State	Description
Unidentified motor torpedo boat	United Arab Republic Navy	Six-Day War: A No. 310-class motor torpedo boat ran aground during a battle with Israeli vessels. Eventually refloated and returned to service.

=== 9 July ===
List of shipwrecks: 9 July 1967
Ship	State	Description
Marisco	Brazil	Put aground on the Tacis Bank, off Praia do Pina, Recife, Brazil, to avoid blocking the port, after she began sinking from a leak (Recife for Santos with salt). Later refloated and broken up

=== 11 July ===
List of shipwrecks: 11 July 1967
Ship	State	Description
USS Currier	United States Navy	The decommissioned Buckley-class destroyer escort was sunk as a target with a Mark 14 Mod. 5 torpedo in the Pacific Ocean off California by the submarine USS Bugara (United States Navy).
Two unidentified motor torpedo boats	United Arab Republic Navy	Six-Day War, Battle of Rumani Coast: Two No. 260-class motor torpedo boats were sunk by gunfire off Rumani, Egypt on the coast of the Sinai Peninsula by the destroyer INS Eilat (Israeli Navy).

=== 12 July ===
List of shipwrecks: 12 July 1967
Ship	State	Description
Demitrios	Liberia	The Liberty ship sprang a leak and sank in the Indian Ocean (9°20′S 48°30′E).

=== 13 July ===
List of shipwrecks: 13 July 1967
Ship	State	Description
President Garcia	Philippines	The cargo ship ran aground in Saints Bay, Guernsey, Channel Islands. Refloated on 20 July.

=== 14 July ===
List of shipwrecks: 14 July 1967
Ship	State	Description
C-198	Vietnam People's Navy	Vietnam War: The blockade runner was captured by the United States Navy after running aground while trying to escape attack by the destroyer escort USS Wilhoite, the gunboat USS Gallup, and the Patrol Craft Fast USS PCF-79 (all United States Navy) and the cutter USCGC Point Orient ( United States Coast Guard). Her commanding officer and her political commissar were killed. She was towed to Da Nang, South Vietnam, where Viet Cong saboteurs sank her in the harbor.
T-343	Vietnam People's Navy	Vietnam War: The T-333/Project 123K-class motor torpedo boat was lost on the Day River, probably to air attack.
T-346	Vietnam People's Navy	Vietnam War: The T-333/Project 123K-class motor torpedo boat was damaged on the Day River, probably by air attack. She sank under tow the next day.

=== 15 July ===
List of shipwrecks: 15 July 1967
Ship	State	Description
Cape Palmas	Liberia	The Liberty ship, which had sprung a leak in the Atlantic Ocean, was beached at Tarrafal, Cape Verde. She was refloated on 25 August and towed to Saint Vincent.
Nymfea	Greece	The Liberty ship collided with Francesca (Liberia) in the English Channel 10 nautical miles (19 km) south of Beachy Head, East Sussex, United Kingdom and was abandoned by the 30 people on board. Fourteen of the survivors were rescued by Vesta ( Trinity House). Nymfea was towed in to Southampton, Hampshire, United Kingdom sinking at the stern.

=== 17 July ===
List of shipwrecks: 17 July 1967
Ship	State	Description
Jamhuri	Zanzibar	The coaster ran aground off Dar es Salaam, Tanzania. All 200 passengers taken off by other vessels.
Kondor	Liberia	The Liberty ship ran aground off Onahama, Japan. She was later refloated but declared a constructive total loss and scrapped.

=== 18 July ===
List of shipwrecks: 18 July 1967
Ship	State	Description
New York News	Canada	The sailing ship foundered off Pugwash, Nova Scotia.

=== 20 July ===
List of shipwrecks: 20 July 1967
Ship	State	Description
Drift	United States	The 12-gross register ton, 39.4-foot (12.0 m) fishing vessel was destroyed by fire in Slaughterhouse Cove (58°20′15″N 136°52′00″W) in Dixon Harbor (58.3494444°N 136.8575°W) in Southeast Alaska.

=== 21 July ===
List of shipwrecks: 21 July 1967
Ship	State	Description
Empire Lola	United Kingdom	The tug was sunk as a target off Bermuda by HMS Leander (Royal Navy).

=== 23 July ===
List of shipwrecks: 23 July 1967
Ship	State	Description
Dream Girl	United States	The 14-gross register ton, 35.3-foot (10.8 m) fishing vessel was destroyed by fire at False Pass, Alaska.

=== 26 July ===
List of shipwrecks: 26 July 1967
Ship	State	Description
Sir Winston Churchill	United Kingdom	The schooner ran aground at the entrance to Holyhead Harbour, Anglesey, refloated later that day.

=== 27 July ===
List of shipwrecks: 27 July 1967
Ship	State	Description
Hadjipateras	Greece	The Liberty ship ran aground off Koronje Island, Burma (16°32′N 94°14′E) and sank. She was on a voyage from Calcutta, India to Rangoon, Burma.

=== 31 July ===
List of shipwrecks: 31 July 1967
Ship	State	Description
Angelina	Liberia	The Liberty ship caught fire in the Indian Ocean and was abandoned off Madras, India. She was later towed to Singapore and scrapped.

== August ==
=== 2 August ===
List of shipwrecks: 2 August 1967
Ship	State	Description
Costoula	Liberia	The Liberty ship ran aground at Malindi, Kenya (3°16′S 40°10′E). she was on a voyage from Bombay, India to Durban, South Africa. She was refloated on 6 October and towed in to Mombasa, Kenya, where she was declared a constructive total loss.

=== 10 August ===
List of shipwrecks: 10 August 1967
Ship	State	Description
Fort William	Canada	The package carrier collided head-on with the merchant vessel Paul J. Tietjen (United States) on Lake Huron. Fort William suffered little damage, but Paul J. Tietjen was holed in her bow.
Paul J. Tietjen	United States	The merchant vessel collided head-on with the package carrier Fort William (Canada) on Lake Huron. Fort William suffered little damage, but Paul J. Tietjen was holed in her bow.

=== 11 August ===
List of shipwrecks: 11 August 1967
Ship	State	Description
British Lantern	United Kingdom	The tanker ran aground in the Schelde at Borssele, Zeeland, the Netherlands. Later refloated by numerous tugs.

=== 13 August ===
List of shipwrecks: 13 August 1967
Ship	State	Description
Santa Fe	Chile	The Liberty ship foundered in the Straits of Magellan. Last sighted at 44°40′S 75°00′W.

=== 14 August ===
List of shipwrecks: 14 August 1967
Ship	State	Description
USS Scurry	United States Navy	The decommissioned Admirable-class minesweeper was sunk as a target in the Atlantic Ocean off the Virginia Capes.

=== 15 August ===
List of shipwrecks: 15 August 1967
Ship	State	Description
"Star of Freedom"	United Kingdom	The 68.9-foot (21.0 m) fishing vessel burned and sank about 4 miles southeast of Barra. Crew were rescued by Castlebay lifeboat.

=== 20 August ===
List of shipwrecks: 20 August 1967
Ship	State	Description
Mary Lou	United States	The motor vessel sank in Little Roller Bay (55°31′N 133°46′W) on the west coast of Noyes Island in the Alexander Archipelago in Southeast Alaska.

=== 22 August ===
List of shipwrecks: 22 August 1967
Ship	State	Description
Silver King	Canada	While fishing, the herring seiner was run down by the tug Ocean Rockswift (flag unknown) and sank off Yarmouth, Nova Scotia. Six lives lost, one survivor.

=== 24 August ===
List of shipwrecks: 24 August 1967
Ship	State	Description
Hubert R Smith	Canada	The coaster caught fire and sank in the Bay of Fundy.

=== 26 August ===
List of shipwrecks: 26 August 1967
Ship	State	Description
Hai Yong	Panama	The ship was wrecked at Pangulasian Island, Palawan, Philippines. The wreck was then stripped of machinery and fittings and converted to a barge and renamed Asian Logger.

=== 27 August ===
List of shipwrecks: 27 August 1967
Ship	State	Description
Aristos	Greece	The ship collided with Linde (Norway) and sank 16 nautical miles (30 km) off Beachy Head, England. All eighteen crew were saved by Linde. Aristos was on a voyage from Antwerp, Belgium to Piraeus.

=== 29 August ===
List of shipwrecks: 29 August 1967
Ship	State	Description
Cucciolo	Italy	wrecked off Pantellaria Island.

=== Unknown date ===
List of shipwrecks: Unknown date in August 1967
Ship	State	Description
Robert Louis Stevenson	United States	The Liberty ship sank 20 nautical miles (37 km) off Rat Island, Alaska.

== September ==
=== 4 September ===
List of shipwrecks: 4 September 1967
Ship	State	Description
Aena	United States	The motor vessel was destroyed by fire in Southwest Cove (56°04′30″N 132°08′30″W) on the coast of Etolin Island in the Alexander Archipelago in Southeast Alaska.
North American	United States	While under tow to a shipyard for conversion into a training ship, the retired 2,317-gross register ton cargo ship sank in 250 feet (76 m) of water in the Atlantic Ocean east of Nantucket, Massachusetts, 25 nautical miles (46 km; 29 mi) northeast of Nantucket Light. Her wreck was located in the summer of 2006.

=== 5 September ===
List of shipwrecks: 5 September 1967
Ship	State	Description
Amfitriti	Hellenic Navy	The decommissioned Gato-class submarine was sunk as a target in the Mediterranean Sea by United States Sixth Fleet vessels.

=== 6 September ===
List of shipwrecks: 6 September 1967
Ship	State	Description
R C Stoner	United States	The tanker ran aground at Wake Island, one of the United States Minor Outlying Islands. She was on a voyage from Honolulu, Hawaii to Wake Island. She broke in two on 8 September and was declared a constructive total loss. The wreck was dispersed by explosives.

=== 10 September ===
List of shipwrecks: 10 September 1967
Ship	State	Description
BNS Vigilance	(Republic of Biafra) Biafran Armed Forces	The Ford-class seaward defence boat was sunk at Port Harcourt, Biafra, by the Nigerian Navy. Later salvaged and scrapped.

=== 13 September ===
List of shipwrecks: 13 September 1967
Ship	State	Description
Denny Rose	United Kingdom	The cargo ship was last reported at 25°15′N 134°23′E. No further trace, presumed foundered. She was on a voyage from Cebu, Philippines to Chiba, Japan.

=== 15 September ===
List of shipwrecks: 15 September 1967
Ship	State	Description
Sam Su No. 7	South Korea	The fishing vessel disappeared in bad weather with the loss of her entire crew of 15 in the North Pacific Ocean approximately 200 nautical miles (370 km; 230 mi) south of the Aleutian Islands and 200 nautical miles (370 km; 230 mi) southwest of Adak, Alaska.
Sam Su No. 8	South Korea	The fishing vessel disappeared in bad weather with the loss of her entire crew of 15 in the North Pacific Ocean approximately 200 nautical miles (370 km; 230 mi) south of the Aleutian Islands and 200 nautical miles (370 km; 230 mi) southwest of Adak, Alaska.

=== 16 September ===
List of shipwrecks: 16 September 1967
Ship	State	Description
Kowloon No.1	Hong Kong	The cargo ship ran aground at Hachinohe, Japan (40°32′N 141°33′E). Refloated on 7 October but declared a constructive total loss. Scrapped in June 1968.

=== 18 September ===
List of shipwrecks: 18 September 1967
Ship	State	Description
Merchantman	United Kingdom	The tug sank 85 nautical miles (157 km) east of Peterhead, Aberdeenshire after colliding with the drilling rig Ocean Prince.
Regency	United Kingdom	The salvage vessel exploded and sank off the Wolf Rock, Isles of Scilly whilst undertaking salvage operations on the wreck of HMS Association (Royal Navy): Her five crew were rescued by trawler Roimage (France).

=== 19 September ===
List of shipwrecks: 19 September 1967
Ship	State	Description
ROKS Dangpo	Republic of Korea Navy	The PCE-842-class patrol craft was sunk in the Sea of Japan north of the maritime demarcation line off the east coast of the Korean Peninsula by North Korean coastal artillery. Thirty-nine of the 79-man crew were killed.

=== 20 September ===
List of shipwrecks: 20 September 1967
Ship	State	Description
Unidentified fishing vessel	South Korea	A fishing vessel was shelled and sunk by North Korean coastal artillery batteries.

=== 21 September ===
List of shipwrecks: 21 September 1967
Ship	State	Description
Attiki	West Germany	The tanker caught fire in the Bay of Eleusis. Although declared a constructive total loss, she was repaired and returned to service.

== October ==
=== 5 October ===
List of shipwrecks: 5 October 1967
Ship	State	Description
Artemida	Cyprus	The Liberty ship sprang a leak and was beached in the Malacca Strait (2°30′N 102°29′E). Later refloated and towed to Shanghai, China.

=== 9 October ===
List of shipwrecks: 9 October 1967
Ship	State	Description
Med Star	Lebanon	The cargo ship foundered in the Mediterranean Sea 30 nautical miles (56 km) south of Pantellaria, Italy.
Panoceanic Faith	United States	During a voyage from San Francisco, California, to India with a cargo of fertilizer, the 8,157-gross register ton, 441.2-foot (134.5 m) Type C2-S-AJ1 steam cargo ship sank in a storm in the North Pacific Ocean approximately 870 nautical miles (1,610 km; 1,000 mi) southwest of Kodiak, Alaska, with the loss of 36 of her 41 crew members.

=== 10 October ===
List of shipwrecks: 10 October 1967
Ship	State	Description
USS Harveson	United States Navy	The decommissioned Edsall-class destroyer escort was sunk as a target in the Pacific Ocean off California.

=== 12 October ===
List of shipwrecks: 12 October 1967
Ship	State	Description
Sankaty Head	United States	The 55-foot (17 m), 37-gross register ton fishing vessel sank without loss of life in 120 feet (37 m) of water 4 nautical miles (7.4 km; 4.6 mi) east of Manomet Point, Plymouth, Massachusetts, at 41°55′03.7″N 070°26′41.8″W after a trawl door pierced her hull.
Statue of Liberty	Liberia	The tanker ran aground off the north coast of Kent, United Kingdom.

=== 16 October ===
List of shipwrecks: 16 October 1967
Ship	State	Description
Vitanic	United States	The 131-gross register ton, 79.1-foot (24.1 m) fishing vessel was destroyed by fire at Chernofski, Alaska.

=== 17 October ===
List of shipwrecks: 17 October 1967
Ship	State	Description
Nagusena	Panama	The cargo ship sank in the North Sea 4 nautical miles (7.4 km) off Esbjerg, Denmark.

=== 18 October ===
List of shipwrecks: 18 October 1967
Ship	State	Description
Margariti	Lebanon	The cargo ship was wrecked off Terschelling, Friesland, Netherlands.

=== 20 October ===
List of shipwrecks: 20 October 1967
Ship	State	Description
Periolos	Greece	The Liberty ship ran aground near Colombo, Ceylon, a total loss.

=== 21 October ===
List of shipwrecks: 21 October 1967
Ship	State	Description
INS Eilat	Israeli Navy	War of Attrition: The Z-class destroyer was struck by two Styx missiles launched from a Komar-class missile boat ( United Arab Republic Navy) and sank with 47 crewmen killed and 100 wounded.

=== 24 October ===
List of shipwrecks: 24 October 1967
Ship	State	Description
Abbott	Canada	The sailing ship caught fire and sank in the George's Bank area of the Gulf of Maine.

=== 27 October ===
List of shipwrecks: 27 October 1967
Ship	State	Description
Hornland	West Germany	The cargo vessel was sunk in a collision in the Nieuw Waterway with Presidente Pierre Angot (France). Raised, repaired and returned to service.

=== Unknown date ===
List of shipwrecks: Unknown date 1967
Ship	State	Description
Roma Um	Argentina	Refloated, having been aground at Belém, Brazil since February, but capsized and sank.

== November ==
=== 3 November ===
List of shipwrecks: 3 November 1967
Ship	State	Description
Habib Marikar	Hong Kong	The cargo ship was wrecked when her engine failed during Typhoon Emma. All but one of her 44 crew were rescued by USS Navarro (United States Navy) before the ship was driven ashore at Lincoln Island, Paracel Islands.
Kostis A. Georgilis	Greece	The Liberty ship caught fire and ran aground in the Coco Islands. Burnt out, she was a total loss.

=== 5 November ===
List of shipwrecks: 5 November 1967
Ship	State	Description
El Hasani	Morocco	The cargo ship caught fire on her maiden voyage off Southampton, United Kingdom. All but two crew taken off by a Swedish tanker.
Rethi Moller	West Germany	The coaster was driven ashore at Penmaenmawr, Caernarvonshire.

=== 6 November ===
List of shipwrecks: 6 November 1967
Ship	State	Description
Loyal Fortunes	Liberia	The Liberty ship was driven onto the Pratas Reef (20°43′N 114°43′E) in a typhoon. Declared a constructive total loss, she was scrapped in situ.
Stella	United States	The 9-gross register ton, 31.1-foot (9.5 m) fishing vessel was destroyed by fire at Carroll Inlet (55°17′N 131°30′W) in Southeast Alaska.

=== 11 November ===
List of shipwrecks: 11 November 1967
Ship	State	Description
Ledra	Cyprus	The cargo ship ran agroundon the Alphee Shoal, off the coast of Ceylon. She was on a voyage from Madras, India to Poland. She broke in two on 14 November and was declared a constructive total loss.

=== 14 November ===
List of shipwrecks: 14 November 1967
Ship	State	Description
USS Guavina	United States Navy	The decommissioned Balao-class submarine was sunk as a target in the Atlantic Ocean off Cape Henry, Virginia, by a Mark 16 torpedo fired by the submarine USS Cubera (United States Navy).

=== 16 November ===
List of shipwrecks: 16 November 1967
Ship	State	Description
California Sun	Liberia	The Liberty ship caught fire and was abandoned in the Indian Ocean (1°38′N 59°39′E). She was later towed to the Seychelles, where she was declared a constructive total loss.

=== 21 November ===
List of shipwrecks: 21 November 1967
Ship	State	Description
USS Clarke County	United States Navy	The tank landing ship was holed when she struck a sunken landing craft while attempting to beach at Doc Pho, Vietnam. The ship lost power and went aground parallel to the beach. Clarke County was pulled off on 1 December.

=== 22 November ===
List of shipwrecks: 22 November 1967
Ship	State	Description
Enosis	Lebanon	The Liberty ship caught fire and was beached on the coast of Thailand (7°52′N 98°56′E). She was later refloated and towed to the Peneng River, where the fire was extinguished. Declared a constructive total loss and scrapped.

=== 23 November ===
List of shipwrecks: 23 November 1967
Ship	State	Description
Dorothy	United States	The motor vessel sank off Hemlock Island (55°09′40″N 131°33′45″W) in Southeast Alaska.
G P C 20	United States	The 31-foot (9.4 m) fishing vessel was destroyed by a storm at Ouzinkie, Alaska.

=== 30 November ===
List of shipwrecks: 30 November 1967
Ship	State	Description
Artemida	Cyprus	The Liberty ship broke in two and sank at Woosung, China.
Nankwang	Hong Kong	The cargo ship ran aground and sank at Woosung. She was on a voyage from Whampoa to Shanghai, China.

== December ==
=== 1 December ===
List of shipwrecks: 1 December 1967
Ship	State	Description
Irving Beech, and Lubrolake	Canada	The Maple type tug Irving Beech ran aground off New Waterford, Nova Scotia with tanker Lubrolake and a barge. All three vessels were lost.

=== 3 December ===
List of shipwrecks: 3 December 1967
Ship	State	Description
Diamantis Gafos	Liberia	The Liberty ship was abandoned in the Atlantic Ocean (0°45′S 41°53′W), presumed subsequently foundered.
Saint Anthony	United States	The 75-foot (22.9 m) fishing vessel was destroyed by a storm in Puale Bay (57°41′N 155°29′W) on the coast of Alaska with the loss of her entire crew of three.

=== 6 December ===
List of shipwrecks: 6 December 1967
Ship	State	Description
Harriet	United States	The crab-fishing vessel sank 1 nautical mile (1.9 km; 1.2 mi) off Seldovia Point (59°29′10″N 151°38′30″W) on the south-central coast of Alaska after striking a submerged log. The fishing vessel Amatuli (United States) rescued her crew of two. Harriet later broke in two, and her stern section washed ashore at Barabara Point.
Pitsa	Panama	The collier sank off Socotra Island, Yemen .

=== 7 December ===
List of shipwrecks: 12 December 1967
Ship	State	Description
Mälarö	Sweden	The fishing trawler was in collision with HDMS Delfinen (Royal Danish Navy) when the latter surfaced north west of Skagen and sank. Her four crew took to a liferaft, but were subsequently discovered dead.

=== 8 December ===
List of shipwrecks: 8 December 1967
Ship	State	Description
Emmanuel M	Greece	The freighter (5400 GRT) ran aground off Scharhörn on and was looted by the islanders from Neuwerk. She was salvaged in July 1970 and towed to Cuxhaven.

=== 12 December ===
List of shipwrecks: 12 December 1967
Ship	State	Description
Geowilka	Greece	The Liberty ship ran aground on Falster Island, Denmark (54°29′N 12°06′E). She was later refloated and towed to Szczecin, Poland, where she was declared a constructive total loss.
Grifone	Italy	The cargo ship was driven ashore on Mavro, Greece 36°00′N 26°23′E) and was abandoned. She sank on 15 December.

=== 13 December ===
List of shipwrecks: 13 December 1967
Ship	State	Description
Valdez	United States	While under tow by the tug Sea Witch (United States) during a storm, the 5,051-ton train barge was wrecked on the coast of Alaska two miles from the entrance to Yakutat Bay. She and 42 railroad cars aboard her became total losses.

=== 15 December ===
List of shipwrecks: 15 December 1967
Ship	State	Description
Mountpark	United Kingdom	The ship was driven ashore on Mavro, Greece. She was abandoned and subsequently sank.

=== 16 December ===
List of shipwrecks: 16 December 1967
Ship	State	Description
Kien An	Hong Kong	The cargo ship broke from her moorings and ran aground at Kakizaki, Japan. She was on a voyage from Thailand to Naoetsu, Japan. She broke in two and was a total loss.

=== 19 December ===
List of shipwrecks: 19 December 1967
Ship	State	Description
NRP LDM-302	Portuguese Navy	Guinea-Bissau War of Independence: The LDM-101-class landing ship was sunk by members of the African Party for the Independence of Guinea and Cape Verde using machine guns and rocket-propelled grenades. Two crewmen killed. raised, repaired and returned to service before June 1968.

=== 20 December ===
List of shipwrecks: 20 December 1967
Ship	State	Description
USS Fessenden	United States Navy	The decommissioned Edsall-class destroyer escort was sunk as a target in the Pacific Ocean off Pearl Harbor, Hawaii.

=== 21 December ===
List of shipwrecks: 21 December 1967
Ship	State	Description
Unidentified fishing vessel	South Korea	A fishing vessel was shelled and sunk by North Korean coastal artillery batteries. Six of her crewmen were killed.

=== 23 December ===
List of shipwrecks: 23 December 1967
Ship	State	Description
Odysion	Greece	The Liberty ship sprang a leak and was abandoned in the Atlantic Ocean (25°49′S 11°13′E), subsequently foundered.

=== 29 December ===
List of shipwrecks: 29 December 1967
Ship	State	Description
Nikos V	Greece	The coaster ran aground 2 nautical miles (3.7 km) from the Driana Lighthouse, Libya. She was on a voyage from Varna, Bulgaria to Benghazi, Libya. She broke up and was a total loss.

=== 30 December ===
List of shipwrecks: 30 December 1967
Ship	State	Description
Sound	United States	The motor vessel was destroyed by fire in Steamboat Bay (55°33′N 133°38′W) off Noyes Island in the Alexander Archipelago in Southeast Alaska.

=== 31 December ===
List of shipwrecks: 31 December 1967
Ship	State	Description
Advance	West Germany	The coaster ran aground at Hook of Holland, South Holland, the Netherlands. All eight crew saved.

== Unknown date ==
List of shipwrecks: Unknown date 1967
Ship	State	Description
"Hamoaze"	United Kingdom	The 85.9-foot (26.2 m) fishing vessel lost her tow and stranded on Pilling Sands sometime in 1967. Sometime after 1973 she was refloated, taken to Strannah and hulked in Skippool Creek
Hongkong Grace	Liberia	The Victory ship collided with the steamship Linda (flag unknown) and was severely damaged.
Improver	United States	The 9-gross register ton, 31.3-foot (9.5 m) fishing vessel sank at Bold Island in Southeast Alaska. The wreck report does not specify which of several islands of the name it is referring to.
USS Oracle	United States Navy	The decommissioned Auk-class minesweeper was sunk as a target in the Pacific Ocean by United States Pacific Fleet forces in the winter of 1967.
Turisten	Norway	The lake steamer was scuttled in the lake Femsjøen, Norway. The wreck was raised in 1997 and restored, work being completed in 2009.

== Sources ==
- Du Toit, Allan (1992). South Africa's Fighting Ships: Past and Present. Rivonia, South Africa: Ashanti Publishing. ISBN 1-874800-50-2.
- Jordan, Roger (1999). The World's Merchant Ships 1939. London: Chatham House. ISBN 1 86176 023 X.
- Sawyer, L. A.; Mitchell, W. H. (1974). Victory Ships and Tankers. Newton Abbot: David and Charles. ISBN 0 7153 6036 1.
- Mitchell, WH; Sawyer, LA (1990). The Empire Ships (Second ed.). London, New York, Hamburg, Hong Kong: Lloyd's of London Press Ltd. ISBN 1-85044-275-4.
- Sawyer, L. A.; Mitchell, W. H. (1985). The Liberty Ships (Second ed.). London: Lloyd's of London Press Ltd. ISBN 1-85044-049-2.
