= Stephen B. Roman =

Stephen B. Roman may refer to:

- Stephen Boleslav Roman (1921–1988), Canadian mining engineer
- Stephen B. Roman (ship), a 1965 Canadian lake freighter and bulk carrier
