= Silver King =

Silver King may refer to:

== People ==
- Silver King (baseball), (Charles Koenig; 1868–1938), American baseball player of the late 19th century
- Silver King (wrestler) (César Cuauhtémoc González Barrón; 1968–2019), Mexican professional wrestler
- Silver King, nickname for Tom Norman (1860–1930), English showman, owner of the freak show that exhibited the "Elephant Man"
- Silver King, nickname for Tim Murnane (1850–1917), Irish-born American baseball sportswriter who was also a player in his earlier years

== Other ==
- Silver King, Fred Thomson's horse, who featured in many Westerns with the 1920s movie star
- Silver King bicycle, produced by George M. Hendee starting in 1892
- FV Silver King, a Canadian fishing vessel that sunk in 1967
- Silver King Creek, a tributary of the Carson River, northwestern Nevada
- Another name for the Atlantic tarpon, a ray-finned fish
- The broadcast television arm of the Home Shopping Network, which later became USA Broadcasting

== See also ==
- The Silver King (disambiguation), several plays and films
