= Pearl light =

Pearl Light may refer to:

- SS Pearl Light, a Hong Kong-registered cargo ship in service 1964–66
- Pearl Light, a beer brewed by the Pearl Brewing Company of San Antonio, Texas, US

== See also ==
- Perlite, an amorphous volcanic glass
- Pearlite, a two-phased structure in steel
