= Nový Ruskov =

Nový Ruskov Újruszka
- Municipality
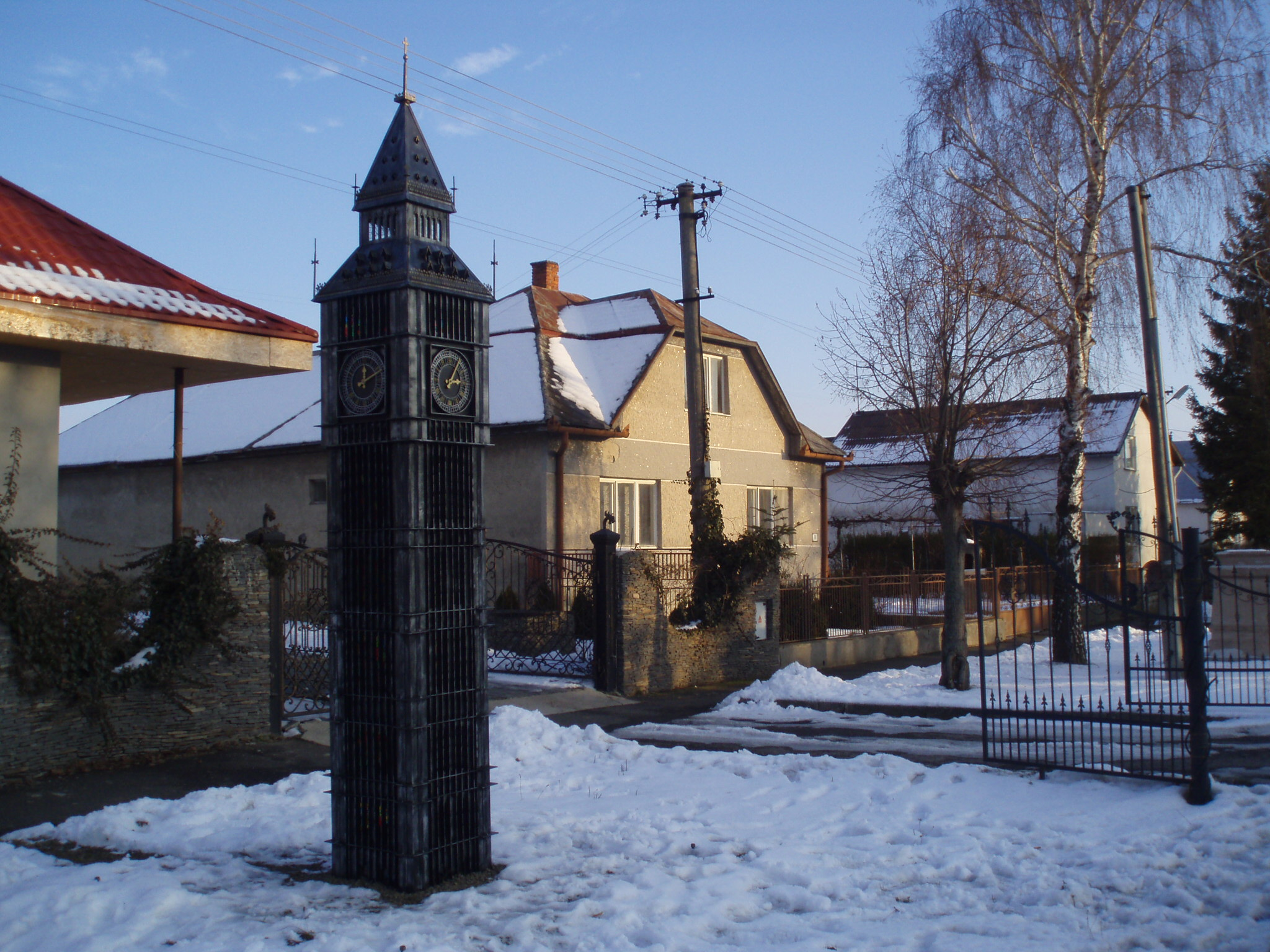

- Flag

- Location of Nový Ruskov in the Košice Region Location of Nový Ruskov in Slovakia
- Coordinates: 48.65°N 21.68°E
- Country: Slovakia
- Region: Košice Region
- District: Trebišov District
- First mentioned: 1214

Area
  - Total: 11.00 km^{2} (4.25 sq mi)
- Elevation: 128 m (420 ft)

Population (2025)
  - Total: 688
- Time zone: UTC+1 (CET)
  - Summer (DST): UTC+2 (CEST)
- Postal code: 750 1
- Area code: +421 56
- Vehicle registration plate (until 2022): TV
- Website: novyruskov.sk

Nový Ruskov (Slovak pronunciation: [ˈnɔʋiː ˈruskɔw]; Hungarian: Újruszka) is a village and municipality in the Trebišov District in the Košice Region of south-eastern Slovakia.

== History ==
In historical records the village was first mentioned in 1214.

== Geography ==
The municipality lies at an altitude of 128 metres (420 ft) and covers an area of 11.00 km^{2} (4.25 sq mi) (2025).

== Population ==
Population statistic (10 years)
Year	1995	2005	2015	2025
Count	651	628	643	688
Difference		−3.53%	+2.38%	+6.99%

Population statistic
Year	2024	2025
Count	695	688
Difference		−1.00%

It has a population of 688 people (31 December 2025).

=== Ethnicity ===
Census 2021 (1+ %)
Ethnicity	Number	Fraction
Slovak	657	96.75%
Not found out	17	2.5%
Rusyn	7	1.03%
Total	679	

In year 2021 was 679 people by ethnicity 657 as Slovak, 17 as Not found out, 7 as Rusyn, 5 as Romani, 3 as Other, 2 as Czech, 1 as Ukrainian, 1 as Polish, 1 as Hungarian and 1 as Korean.

Note on population: The difference values of population numbers in the table "Population statistic" and in the sections "Ethnicity" & "Religion" is caused by the use of various statistical methods.

=== Religion ===
Census 2021 (1+ %)
Religion	Number	Fraction
Greek Catholic Church	386	56.85%
Roman Catholic Church	219	32.25%
None	41	6.04%
Not found out	19	2.8%
Total	679	

In year 2021 was 679 people by religion 386 from Greek Catholic Church, 219 from Roman Catholic Church, 41 from None, 19 from Not found out, 6 from Calvinist Church, 3 from Eastern Orthodox Church, 2 from Evangelical Church, 1 from Church of the Brethren, 1 from Apostolic Church and 1 from Ad hoc movements.

== Facilities ==
The village has a public library and a football pitch.

The Church of Most Holy Mother of God built some time between 1749 and 1843 was probably the model for a Slovak Catholic cathedral in Markham, Ontario.

== Notable people ==
- Štefan Boleslav Roman, Canadian mine owner
