= The Silver King =

The Silver King may refer to:

- The Silver King (play), an 1882 play by Henry Herman and Henry Arthur Jones
- The Silver King (1919 film), an American film adaptation of the play
- The Silver King (1929 film), a British film adaptation of the play

== See also ==
- Silver King (disambiguation)
