= Noyes Island =

Island in the United States of America

Coordinates: 55°29′51″N 133°40′16″W

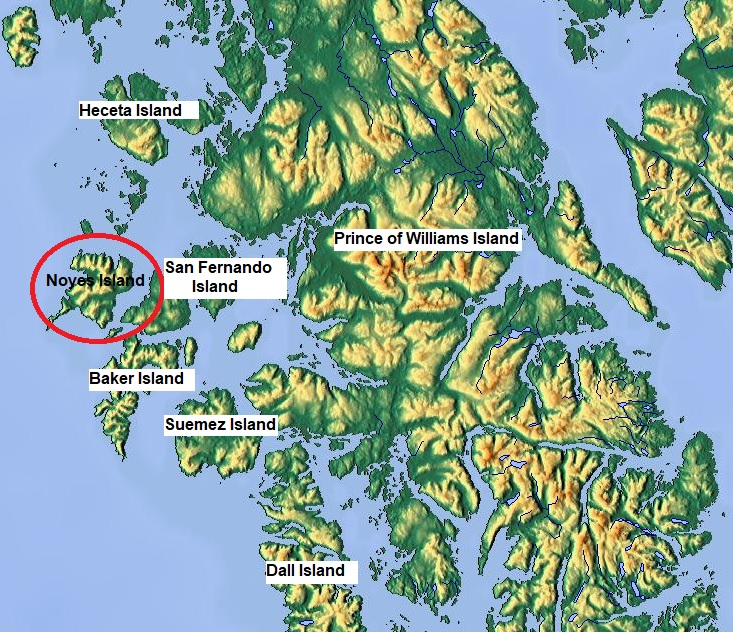
Location of Noyes Island

Noyes Island is located in the Alexander Archipelago of Southeast Alaska, United States. It is located west of Prince of Wales Island. It was named in 1879 by William Healy Dall of the United States Coast and Geodetic Survey after William M. Noyes, also of the USC&GS, who was stationed in Alaska from 1873 to 1880. The first European to notice the island was Aleksei Chirikov in 1741.
