= Stephen Boleslav Roman =

Canadian businessman (1921–1988)

- Born: 17 April 1921; Veľký Ruskov, Czechoslovakia
- Died: 23 March 1988 (aged 66); Markham, Ontario
- Spouse: Bozena Gardon (m. 1945)

Stephen Boleslav Roman (17 April 1921 – 23 March 1988) was a prominent Canadian mining engineer and mining executive of a Slovak origin.

Business commentator Diane Francis described him as a self-made man in her book Controlling Interest. A 1967 profile in Fortune magazine said "Toronto teems with speculators who have made it big promoting oil, mines, and penny stocks, but no one has made it bigger than Stephen Boleslav Roman." Peter Newman profiled him in "Sometimes a great nation: will Canada belong to the 21st century?"

== Early life ==
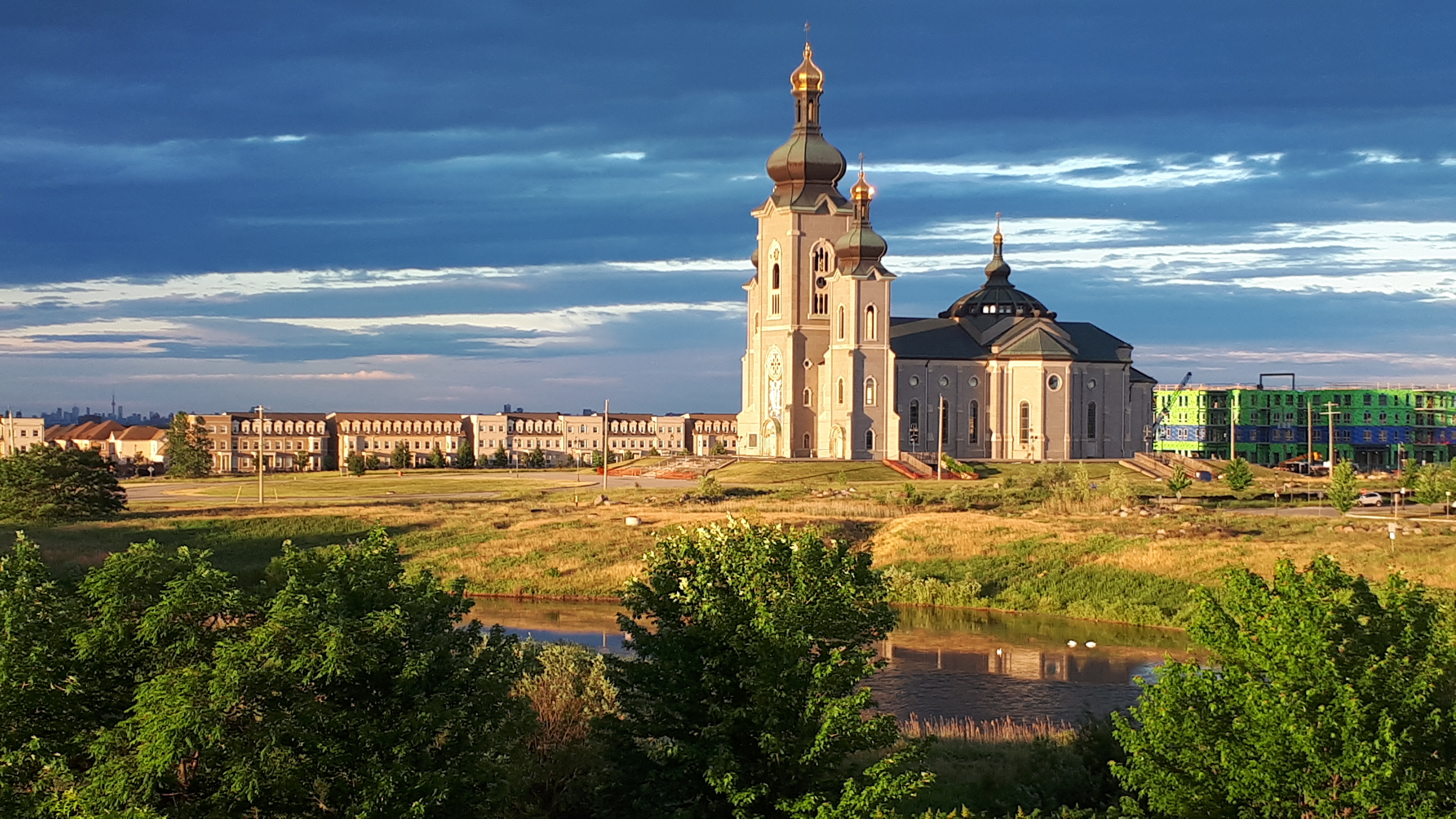
Cathedral of the Transfiguration in Markham

Štefan Boleslav Roman was born in the village of Veľký Ruskov (now Nový Ruskov) in Slovakia, then part of the Czechoslovak Republic. He emigrated to Canada when he was 16 years old, shortly before Nazi Germany annexed his native Czechoslovakia.

== Religion ==
Since his youth, he was strongly connected to the Greek Catholic Church. He helped to found and organize the Slovak Catholic Eparchy of Saints Cyril and Methodius of Toronto. The monumental Cathedral of the Transfiguration of our Lord in Markham was funded and designed by him, modeling the structure on the church in Veľký Ruskov.

== Recognition ==
Roman was invested in the Order of Canada and the Canadian Mining Hall of Fame. The Vatican appointed him a Papal knight.

The lake freighter Stephen B. Roman was named after him.
