= USS Navarro =

1944 Haskell-class American attack transport

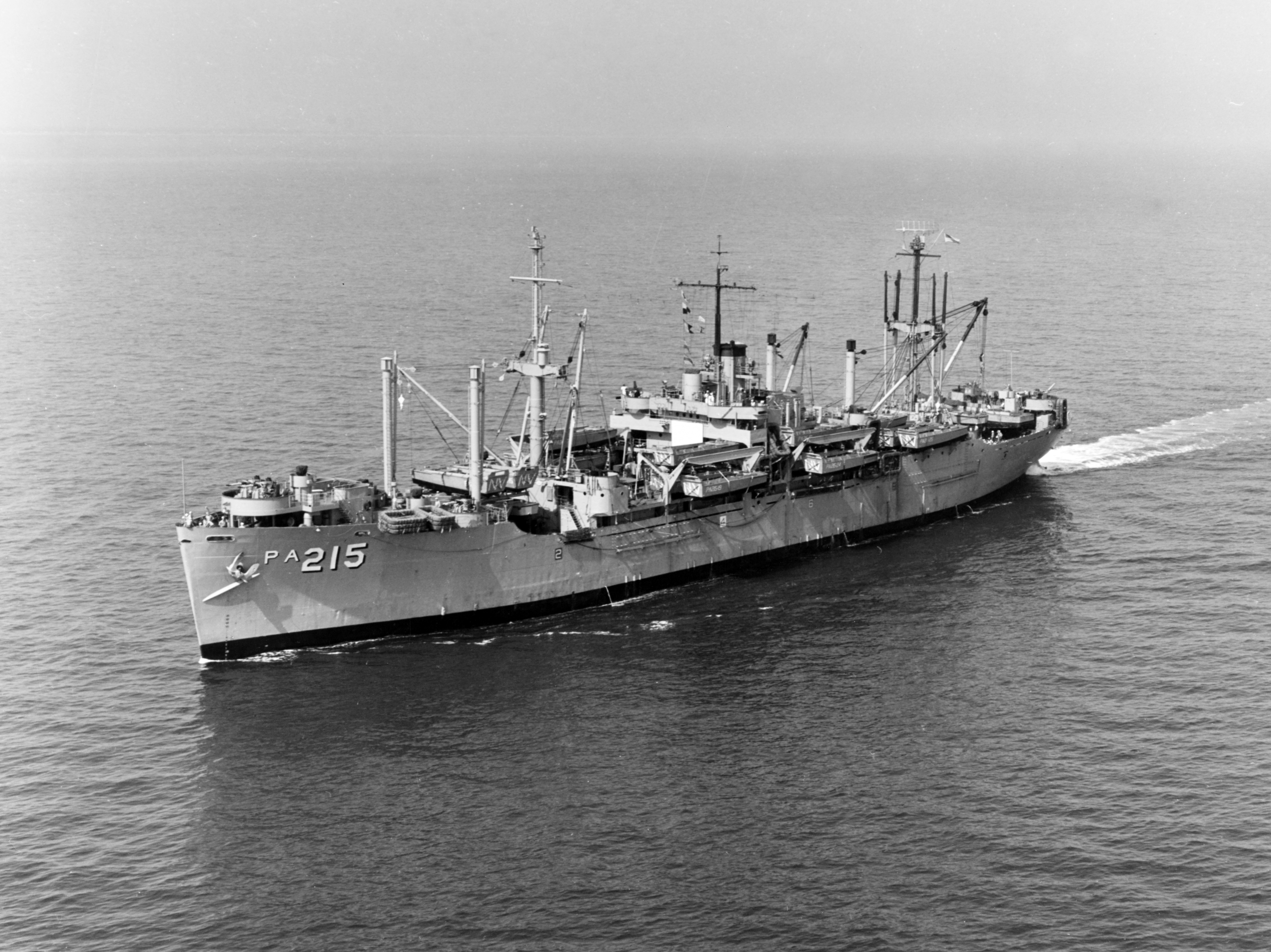
- USS Navarro, circa in 1964

History

United States
- Name: Navarro
- Namesake: Navarro County, Texas
- Ordered: as a Type VC2-S-AP5 hull, MCE hull 563
- Builder: Permanente Metals Corporation, Richmond, California
- Yard number: 563
- Laid down: 27 June 1944
- Launched: 3 October 1944
- Sponsored by: Mrs Anne Jones
- Commissioned: 15 November 1944
- Decommissioned: 15 March 1946
- Stricken: 1 October 1958
- Identification: Hull symbol: APA-215; Code letters: NPQH
- Honors and awards: 1 × battle star for World War II service
- Fate: Returned to Navy 2 December 1950

United States
- Acquired: 5 August 1961
- Recommissioned: 2 December 1950
- Decommissioned: 20 August 1970
- Reclassified: redesignated Amphibious Transport (LPA-215), 1 January 1969
- Stricken: 1 December 1976
- Identification: Hull symbol: APA-215; Hull symbol: LPA-215
- Fate: transferred to Maritime Administration (MARAD), 20 August 1970, laid up in the National Defense Reserve Fleet, Suisun Bay Group, Benicia, California trade-out, 19 February 1982, withdrawn, 16 June 1982

General characteristics
- Class & type: Haskell-class attack transport
- Type: Type VC2-S-AP5
- Displacement: 6,873 long tons (6,983 t) (light load); 14,837 long tons (15,075 t) (full load)
- Length: 455 ft (139 m)
- Beam: 62 ft (19 m)
- Draft: 24 ft (7.3 m)
- Installed power: 2 × Combustion Engineering header-type boilers, 465 psi (3,210 kPa) 750 °F (399 °C); 8,500 shp (6,338 kW)
- Propulsion: 1 × Westinghouse geared turbine; 1 x propeller
- Speed: 17.7 kn (32.8 km/h; 20.4 mph)
- Boats & landing craft carried: 2 × LCMs; 1 × open LCPL; 18 × LCVPs; 2 × LCPRs; 1 × closed LCPL (Captain's Gig)
- Capacity: 2,900 long tons (2,900 t) DWT; 150,000 cu ft (4,200 m^{3}) (non-refrigerated)
- Troops: 86 officers, 1,475 enlisted
- Complement: 56 officers, 480 enlisted
- Armament: 1 × 5 in (127 mm)/38 caliber dual purpose gun; 1 × quad 40 mm (1.6 in) Bofors anti-aircraft (AA) gun mounts; 4 × twin 40mm Bofors (AA) gun mounts; 10 × single 20 mm (0.8 in) Oerlikon cannons AA mounts

Service record
- Part of: TransRon 11
- Operations: World War II; Assault and occupation of Okinawa Gunto (1–7 April 1945); Korean War Era; Occupation service in Europe (3 May–8 October 1952); Vietnam War; Vietnam Advisory Campaign (13–21 May 1962, 30 May–5 June, 20 June–3 July 1965); Vietnam Defense (4 July–23 August, 25 September–23 December 1965); Vietnam Counteroffensive (16 January–18 February 1966); Vietnam Counteroffensive–Phase III (28–31 August, 8–26 September, 5 November–3 December 1967, 18 December 1967 – 29 January 1968); Tet Counteroffensive (30 January–19 February 1968)
- Awards: World War II; China Service Medal; American Campaign Medal; Asiatic–Pacific Campaign Medal; World War II Victory Medal; Navy Occupation Service Medal; National Defense Service Medal; Vietnam Era; Meritorious Unit Commendation; Armed Forces Expeditionary Medal; Vietnam Service Medal; Republic of Vietnam Gallantry Cross Unit Citation; Republic of Vietnam Campaign Medal

USS Navarro (APA/LPA-215) was a Haskell-class attack transport of the US Navy. She was of the VC2-S-AP5 Victory ship design type that saw service in World War II and the Vietnam War. Navarro was named after Navarro County, Texas.

== Construction ==
She was laid down 27 June 1944, under Maritime Commission (MARCOM) contract, MCV hull 563, by Permanente Metals Corporation, Yard No. 2, Richmond, California; launched on 3 October 1944; sponsored by Mrs. Anne Jones; and commissioned 15 November.

== Service history ==
=== World War II ===
After commissioning, Navarro moved to the Naval Supply Depot, San Francisco to take on stores. Then, in a series of moves about San Francisco Bay, the ship took on ammunition and degaussed. She commenced shakedown 1 December, with a twelve-day cruise to San Pedro, and 16 December, she commenced a week of amphibious training at San Diego.

Navarro got underway New Year's Day 1945 for Seattle, Washington, to embark troops and equipment for transport to the South Pacific. She departed Seattle 12 January, called at the Hawaiian Islands 20 January, reached Guadalcanal 10 February, where she offloaded cargo and troops, and then moved to Sunlight Channel, Russell Islands. At the Russells, Navarro participated in an intensive rehearsal for the invasion of Okinawa.

==== Invasion of Okinawa ====
Navarro arrived off Okinawa Easter Sunday 1945, the morning that US Forces invaded the island. The next two days were spent offloading troops and cargo, accomplished in record time. So effective was screening and air cover that, despite several air alerts, Navarro's gunners fired on hostile air contacts but three times.

==== Transport duties ====
After six days in the area, Navarro steamed for Guam. The morning of 12 April, she departed for the United States, via Pearl Harbor, arriving San Francisco 30 May; then transported troops and equipment to Seattle. She departed Seattle 21 June, for Ulithi via Eniwetok, but continued on to Okinawa where she commenced offloading 24 July, amidst frequent calls to General Quarters. Navarro then steamed to Ulithi, and was anchored in that lagoon when the Japanese surrendered.

She had been scheduled to return to the United States, but was hurriedly rerouted to the Philippines and arrived Leyte 23 August. A few days later she steamed for Yokohama, carrying occupation troops for the Yokohama district. Navarro next participated in Operation Magic Carpet, returning American troops home.

==== Decommissioning ====
She decommissioned 15 March 1946, entered the Pacific Reserve Fleet at Stockton, California, where she remained until the Korean War generated the requirement for a rapid expansion of forces.

=== Second commission ===
Recommissioned 2 December 1950, Navarro transited the Panama Canal to join the Amphibious Force, Atlantic Fleet. During the next four years she operated out of Norfolk, Virginia, participating in both Mediterranean and Caribbean deployments.

She returned to the US Pacific Fleet in 1955, and made periodic deployments to the Western Pacific. Her 1956 WESTPAC cruise was marked by amphibious demonstrations held for the Korean Marines and Midshipmen at Chinhae, Korea.

During the summer of 1958, Navarro provided services for a series of atomic tests at Eniwetok. In 1960, she landed 1,200 Marines on Formosan beaches while participating in a mock amphibious invasion.

==== Laotian crisis ====
The Laotian situation entailed changes of embarkation plans for the 1st Battalion, 4th Marines, while Navarro was in Hawaii. Originally intended for a practice assault on California beaches, the Marines were instead carried under sealed orders to Okinawa.

After participating in large scale amphibious demonstrations for the president in January 1962, Navarro deployed to the Western Pacific 22 January, for a seven-month tour with the 7th Fleet. When a further deterioration of the Laotian situation seemed imminent, the president ordered a task force to move toward Indochina 12 May. Navarro carried a portion of the 1,800 embarked Marines of this force.

When aircraft carrier Valley Forge, Navarro, and dock landing ship Point Defiance arrived in the Gulf of Siam, they were directed to off-load their 1,800-man Battalion Landing Team by helicopter from the Gulf to Bangkok, Thailand. This force bolstered the Thai defense against possible attack by Laotian communists.

Navarro departed Okinawa 11 August and arrived Long Beach 25 August for upkeep and operational readiness training.

==== Project SHAD ====
Navarro was subjected to at least two simulated biological weapon attacks in the first half of 1963 under Project SHAD.

==== Movie ====
The ship's boats were used for the re-creation of the Normandy landings of 6 June 1944, in the 1964 film The Americanization of Emily, starring James Garner and Julie Andrews. This is a minor anachronism to the film, as the Navarro was laid down after D-Day.

==== Modernization overhaul ====
Upon return from her 1964 Western Pacific deployment, Navarro underwent a Fleet Rehabilitation and Modernization overhaul at Pacific Ship Repair Shipyard, San Francisco. Upon completion, she participated in Exercise "Silver Lance" 25 February-9 March 1965, off the southern California coast, and 27 April, she departed on another WESTPAC deployment.

==== Vietnam War ====
From 27 January through 16 February 1966, Navarro formed part of a special task unit which provided boating and support for the combat landing of 1,200 Marines in Southern Quang Ngai Province, Republic of Vietnam, in Operation Double Eagle. Over a dozen ships and 5,000 Marines and Sailors combined to mark "Double Eagle" as the largest amphibious operation up to that time since the Korean War.

===== Unit commendation =====
Navarro returned to Long Beach, California on 16 March, after 10 months and 27 days as part of the Amphibious Assault Forces of the 7th Fleet operating off Vietnam. For service in support of military operations in Vietnam during the period 1 January through 23 March 1968, Navarro received the Secretary of the Navy, Meritorious Unit Commendation. She rescued 43 seamen from the stranded British merchant ship Habib Marikar when it grounded on a reef in the South China Sea during typhoon Emma. In November 1967, Navarro's salvage efforts contributed directly to the salvage of landing ship-tank Clarke County, damaged and stranded on the coast of Vietnam. Navarro's officers and men carried out this salvage operation within range of enemy small arms and artillery.

==== Final decommission ====
Navarro continued to maintain a high state of readiness and provided amphibious expertise through both her west coast training operations and her deployments to the Western Pacific. Reclassified an amphibious transport, LPA-215, on 1 January 1969, she was decommissioned at San Diego.

On 20 August 1970, she was transferred to the Maritime Administration (MARAD) and placed in the National Defense Reserve Fleet, Suisun Bay Group, Benicia, California. She was permanently transferred to MARAD on 1 September 1971 and stricken on 1 December 1976, from the Naval Vessel Register.

On 19 February 1982, she was exchanged to Farrell Lines, Inc., who immediately sold her to C.W. Enterprise Investments, Inc., with the provision that she be scrapped within 24 months in either South Korea or Taiwan. She was withdrawn from the fleet 16 June 1982.

== Awards ==
Navarro received one battle star for World War II service, and four campaign stars and a unit commendation for service in the Vietnam War.

== Notes ==
Citations

== Bibliography ==
Online resources

- "Navarro". Dictionary of American Naval Fighting Ships. Naval History and Heritage Command. 12 August 2015. This article incorporates text from this source, which is in the public domain.
- "Kaiser Permanente No. 2, Richmond CA". Shipbuilding History. 13 October 2010.
- "USS Navarro (LPA-215)". NavSource. 7 January 2017.
- "NAVARRO (APA-215/LPA-215)". United States Department of Transportation. Archived from the original on 19 October 2016.
