= FV Silver King =

History

Canada
- Name: Silver King
- Port of registry: Wedgeport, Nova Scotia
- Fate: Collision with Ocean Rockswift on August 22, 1967

General characteristics
- Length: 55 ft (17 m)
- Sail plan: Seiner

The FV Silver King was a Canadian herring seiner based out of Wedgeport, Nova Scotia.

== Collision and sinking ==
On August 22, 1967, the 233-ton tugboat Ocean Rockswift was heading back to its home port of Saint John, New Brunswick. Silver King was out at sea on a herring fishing trip. Around midnight, the tugboat struck Silver King about nine miles off the coast of Yarmouth, Nova Scotia. Silver King immediately flipped on its side and took on water. Crew members from the seiner Dunville boarded the submerged vessel and cut a hole in the bow to rescue the lone survivor. Less than 24 hours later, two scuba divers, Andy Wallace and Jack Hatfield, entered the submerged vessel through the hole and recovered six bodies.

=== Casualties ===
Six crew members died in the incident, all were from Wedgeport. The lone survivor was 27 year-old Robert Bruce "Bobby" McDowell of Hackensack, New Jersey who was vacationing in Wedgeport with his family. His uncle, Captain Roderick Boudreau died in the accident.

Name	Age	Notes
Captain Roderick Boudreau		
Edgar Boudreau		
Vernon Boudreau		
Stanis Bourque		
Camille LeBlanc		
Raymond LeBlanc		

=== Inquiry ===
An inquiry was held before Justice L. Ritchie of the New Brunswick Supreme Court.
