= Stephen B. Roman (ship) =

Canadian lake freighter and bulk carrier

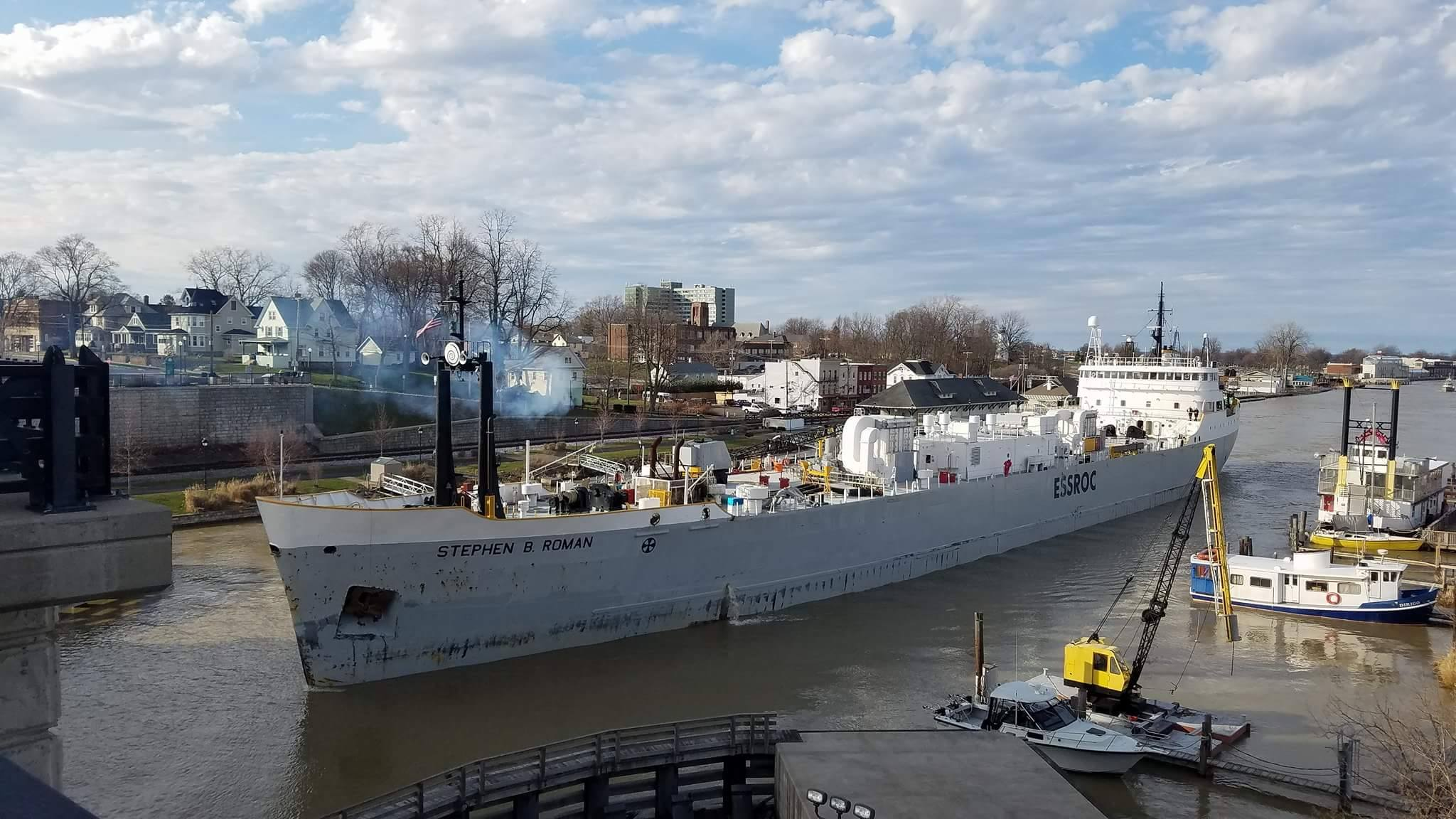
- Stephen B. Roman passing through the Port of Rochester, in Rochester, New York

History
- Name: Fort William (1965–1983); Stephen B. Roman (1983–2018)
- Owner: Canadian Steamship Lines (1965–1982); Lake Ontario Cement Company (later ESSROC) (1982–2018)
- Operator: Canada Steamship Lines (1965–1998); Upper Lakes Group of Toronto (1998–2004); Seaway Marine Transport (2004–2017); McKeil Marine (2017–2018)
- Builder: Davie Shipbuilding, Lauzon
- Launched: April 24, 1965
- Completed: May 1965
- Out of service: November 2018
- Identification: IMO number: 6514900; MMSI number: 316001717; Callsign: CFA2355
- Fate: Scrapped in Aliağa, Turkey

General characteristics
- Type: Package freighter (as built); Cement carrier (after 1983)
- Length: 148.9 m (488 ft 6 in) oa; 142.6 m (467 ft 10 in) pp
- Beam: 17.2 m (56 ft 5 in)
- Depth: 10.8 m (35 ft 5 in)
- Installed power: 5,994 bhp (4,470 kW)
- Propulsion: 2 × Fairbanks Morse 10-cylinder 10-38D8-1/8 diesel engines; 2 × Fairbanks Morse 8-cylinder 8-38-D8-1/8 diesel engines; 1 × screw
- Speed: 16 knots (30 km/h; 18 mph)
- Capacity: 7,519 metric tons (7,400 long tons) (as built); 7,722 metric tons (7,600 long tons) (after 1983)

Stephen B. Roman was a Canadian bulk carrier operating on the Great Lakes owned by Lake Ontario Cement Company. The vessel was initially launched as Fort William in 1965 and owned and operated by Canada Steamship Lines. She carries dry cement to Great Lakes ports, and is named after prominent Canadian mining engineer Stephen Boleslav Roman. The ship was taken out of service in November 2018.

== Description ==
The ship as built was 148.9 m (488 ft 6 in) long overall and 142.6 m (467 ft 10 in) between perpendiculars with a beam of 17.2 m (56 ft 5 in). The ship had a gross register tonnage (GRT) of 6,792 and a deadweight tonnage of 8,245. The ship's depth of hold was 10.8 m (35 ft 5 in). The ship was powered by two Fairbanks Morse 10-cylinder 10-38D8-1/8 diesel engines producing 3,330 brake horsepower (2,480 kW) and two Fairbanks Morse 8-cylinder 8-38-D8-1/8 diesel engines producing 2,664 bhp (1,987 kW) for a total of 5,994 bhp (4,470 kW). The engines drove one screw giving the vessel a maximum speed of 16 knots (30 km/h; 18 mph). As built, the ship had a carrying capacity of 7,519 metric tons (7,400 long tons) with a draught of 6.5 m (21 ft 4 in) . After conversion, the ship had a mid-summer capacity of 7,722 metric tons (7,600 long tons) with a draught of 6.9 m (22 ft 8 in).

== Service history ==
The ship was ordered by Canada Steamship Lines (CSL) from Davie Shipbuilding for construction at the yard in Lauzon, Quebec with the yard number 652. Launched on April 24, 1965 as Fort William, the ship was completed in May 1965. Fort William, named for Fort William, Ontario, was initially a package freighter carrying ore pellets, the largest and last one constructed for Canada Steamship Lines. She capsized on September 14, 1965, due to human error when unloading at Montreal, Quebec. Her lower holds were emptied, while her upper decks were heavily loaded. Fort William was carrying 300 tons of calcium carbide which reacted with water to produce acetylene which then exploded. Five sailors were killed. The vessel was salvaged, taken to Davie Shipbuilding and restored to service in May 1966.

Fort William collided with the merchant vessel Paul L. Tietjen on August 10, 1967. The two ships collided head-on in Lake Huron, with Fort William only slightly damaged while Paul L. Tietjen was holed in her bow. In 1976, the vessel was transferred to Power Corp of Canada Ltd. Fort William continued in uneventful service until December 17, 1977 when the ship ran aground in Maumee Bay at Toledo, Ohio. Two years later, on October 1, 1979, Fort William struck the Detroit River Light in fog. Fort William's bow was damaged, and the ship was sent to Thunder Bay, Ontario for repairs at Port Arthur Shipyards.

Due to increased competition from other methods of transport for packaged goods Fort William was laid up at Hamilton, Ontario in 1981. The vessel was purchased in 1982 by the Lake Ontario Cement Company, now ESSROC Canada, which converted the ship to a self-unloading cement carrier. The ship was renamed Stephen B. Roman in 1983, named for a prominent Canadian mining engineer. In March 2007, the ship ran aground at the mouth of the Genesee River. The ship was unstuck, but silt build-up at the entrance to the port of Rochester, New York prevented the ship from entering. This led to 7,000 shipments of concrete by truck. In 2017, Stephen B. Roman was acquired by McKeil Marine. The purchase was announced on January 19, 2017.

Following her purchase, Stephen B. Roman was laid up in Toronto and remained alongside. Stephen B. Roman was the last of the Fairbanks-Morse-powered lakers and the final former CSL package freight fleet ship in service. In November 2018, the ship was officially taken out of service and sent to a scrapyard in Aliağa, Turkey.Stephen B. Roman was reflagged Saint Vincent and the Grenadines and sailed to Turkey under her own power. On December 18 the ship was beached to be broken up.
