= SS Empire Duchess =

1943 British cargo ship

History
- Name: Empire Duchess (1943–49); Braemar Castle (1949–50); King James (1950–58); Tyne Breeze (1958–63); Cathay Trader (1963–64); Pearl Light (1964–66); Habib Marikar (1966–67)
- Owner: Ministry of War Transport (1943–45); Ministry of Transport (1945–49); Union Castle Mail Steamship Co Ltd (1949–50); King Line Ltd (1950–58); Cambay Prince Steamship Co Ltd (1959–63); Cathay Trader Steamship Co Ltd (1963–64); Pacific Pearl Navigation Co Ltd (1964–66); Marikar Navigation & Agencies Ltd (1966–67)
- Operator: H Hogarth & Sons Ltd (1943-46); Union Castle Mail Steamship Co Ltd (1946–50); King Line Ltd (1950–58); J Manners & Co Ltd (1958–64); Pacific Pearl Navigation Co Ltd (1964–66); Marikar Navigation & Agencies Ltd (1966–67)
- Port of registry: (United Kingdom) Sunderland, UK (1943-49); (United Kingdom) London (1949–58); Hong Kong (1958-67)
- Builder: Short Brothers Ltd
- Yard number: 478
- Launched: 14 August 1943
- Completed: December 1943
- Maiden voyage: 16 December 1943
- Out of service: 3 November 1967
- Identification: United Kingdom Official Number 180051 (1943–58); Code Letters GBQP (1943–58)
- Fate: Wrecked

General characteristics
- Type: Cargo ship
- Tonnage: 7,067 GRT; 4,879 NRT
- Length: 431 ft 0 in (131.37 m)
- Beam: 56 ft 3 in (17.15 m)
- Draught: 26 ft 9 in (8.15 m)
- Depth: 35 ft 2 in (10.72 m)
- Installed power: 510 nhp
- Propulsion: Triple expansion steam engine
- Crew: 44 (Habib Malakar)

Location where Habib Marikar was wrecked near the Paracel Islands.

Habib Marikar was a 7,067 GRT cargo ship that was built in 1943 by Short Brothers Ltd, Sunderland, Co Durham as Empire Duchess for the Ministry of War Transport (MoWT). She was sold into merchant service in 1949 and renamed Braemar Castle. A further sale in 1950 saw her renamed King James.

In 1958, she was sold to Hong Kong and renamed Tyne Breeze. Further sales in 1963 and 1964 saw her renamed Cathay Trader and Pearl Light respectively. In 1966, she was sold and renamed Habib Marikar. She was wrecked on 3 November 1967 when her engine failed whilst the ship was caught in Typhoon Emma. All but one of her crew were rescued by USS Navarro before the ship was driven ashore on the Paracel Islands and wrecked.

== Description ==
The ship was built in 1943 by Short Brothers Ltd, Sunderland. She was yard number 478.

The ship was 431 feet 0 inches (131.37 m) long, with a beam of 56 feet 3 inches (17.15 m). She had a depth of 35 feet 2 inches (10.72 m) and a draught of 26 feet 9 inches (8.15 m). She was assessed at 7,067 GRT, 4,879 NRT.

The ship was propelled by a 510 nhp triple expansion steam engine, which had cylinders of 23 1/2 inches (60 cm), 39 inches (99 cm) and 70 inches (180 cm) diameter by 48 inches (120 cm) stroke. The engine was built by J Dickinson & Sons Ltd, Sunderland.

== History ==
=== World War II ===
Empire Duchess was launched on 14 August 1943 and completed in December. The United Kingdom Official Number 180051 and Code Letters GBQP were allocated. Her port of registry was Sunderland and she was placed under the management of H Hogarth & Sons Ltd.

Empire Duchess was towed from Sunderland to the Tyne on 24 August 1943. She was towed back to Sunderland on 24 September. On 16 December, she made her maiden voyage, sailing to the Tyne. She departed from the Tyne on 22 December to join Convoy FN 1212, which had departed from Southend, Essex the previous day and arrived at Methil, Fife on 23 December. She then joined Convoy EN 323, which departed that day an arrived at Loch Ewe on 25 December. Empire Duchess was a member of Convoy ON 218, which departed from Liverpool, Lancashire on 31 December and arrived at New York on 18 January 1944. She left the convoy and sailed to the Clyde, arriving on 3 January 1943.

Empire Duchess sailed on 13 January to join Convoy ONS 27, which had departed from Liverpool that day and arrived at Halifax, Nova Scotia, Canada on 31 January. She arrived at Halifax on 4 February, due to engine defects. On 14 February, Empire Duchess departed Halifax as a member of Convoy XB 96, which arrived at Boston, Massachusetts, United States on 17 February. Arriving at the Cape Cod Canal that day, she sailed to New York, arriving the next day. About this time, she either ran aground or was involved in a collision either in the Cape Cod Canal or at Boston.

Empire Duchess departed from New York on 21 March and sailed to the Hampton Roads, Virginia, arriving the next day. She then joined Convoy UGS 37, which departed on 24 March and arrived at Port Said, Egypt on 19 April. She left the convoy at Augusta, Italy, where she arrived on 15 April. She then sailed to Bari and back via convoys AH 37 and HA 40, arriving back at Augusta on 5 May. Empire Duchess then joined Convoy GUS 39, which had departed from Port Said on 4 May and arrived at the Hampton Roads on 29 May. She left the convoy at Casablanca, Morocco, on 17 May. She departed from Casablanca on 23 May to join Convoy OS 77, which had departed from Liverpool combined with Convoy KMS 51. The two convoys had separated at sea on 23 May, with KMS 51 arriving at Gibraltar on 25 May. OS 77 arrived at Freetown, Sierra Leone on 2 June. She departed from Freetown on 5 June as a member of Convoy STL 24, which arrived at Takoradi, French West Africa on 10 June. On 22 June, Empire Duchess departed from Takoradi as a member of Convoy TGE 13, which dispersed at sea on 25 June. She sailed to Lagos, Nigeria, arriving on 24 June.

Empire Duchess was a member of Convoy LTS 26, which departed from Lagos on 9 July and arrived at Freetown on 14 July. She departed from Freetown on 23 July for Bathurst, South Africa, arriving on 27 July. Empire Duchess departed from Bathurst on 11 August for Dakar, Senegal, where she arrived later that day. She departed on 12 August to join Convoy SL 167, which had departed from Freetown on 9 August and rendezvoused at sea with convoy MKS 58 on 19 August. The combined convoys arrived at Liverpool on 29 August. Empire Duchess was carrying a cargo describes at "government stores". She was bound for Gibraltar, arriving on 21 August.

Empire Duchess departed from Gibraltar on 12 September as a member of Convoy KMS 62, which arrived at Port Said on 22 September. She left the convoy at Bône, Algeria due to developing defects. arriving on 15 September and departing on 26 September to join Convoy KMS 63, which had departed from Gibraltar on 23 September and arrived at Port Said on 3 October. Empire Duchess was a member of Convoy GUS 56, which departed from Port Said on 22 October and arrived at the Hampton Roads on 19 November. She left the convoy at Melilla, Spain, arriving on 2 November and departing two days later for Gibraltar, where she arrived on 5 November.

Empire Duchess was a member of Convoy MKS 66G, which departed from Gibraltar on 7 November and rendezvoused at sea with Convoy SL 175 the next day. The combined convoys arrived at Liverpool on 15 November. She was carrying a cargo of iron ore bound for Falmouth, Cornwall. She then sailed to Southend, arriving on 19 November and departing two days later as a member of Convoy FN 1548, which had a destination of Methil. She left the convoy at Middlesbrough, Yorkshire, arriving on 22 November.

Empire Duchess departed from Middlesbrough on 20 December and sailed to Southend, arriving on 25 December. She was involved in a collision with another ship, possibly Chemong, on 21 December off the coast of Norfolk (52°59′15″N 1°49′30″E). She was a member of Convoy FN 1585, which departed on 28 December and arrived at Methil on 30 December. She left the convoy at Immingham, Lincolnshire, arriving on 29 December. Empire Duchess sailed to Hull, Yorkshire on 17 January 1945. On or about 5 February, she joined Convoy FS 1718, which had departed from Methil on 4 February and arrived at Southend on 6 February. She spent most of the next four months sailing between Southend and Antwerp, Belgium.

On 18 February, Empire Duchess was in port at Ghent, Belgium when there was an explosion and fire in the No. 2 hold. This was caused by a steel joist striking a 25-pounder shell and detonating it whilst the ship was being unloaded. Her Captain, Lieutenant Walter Denton, was Mentioned in Despatches for his actions in fighting the fire and preventing a larger explosion without regard to his personal Safety. She arrived at Hull on 26 February, for repairs which were carried out at Grimsby, Lincolnshire. Empire Duchess departed from Hull on 13 March and resumed service between Southend and Antwerp. She arrived at Southend with Convoy ATM 155 on 16 May.

=== Post-war ===
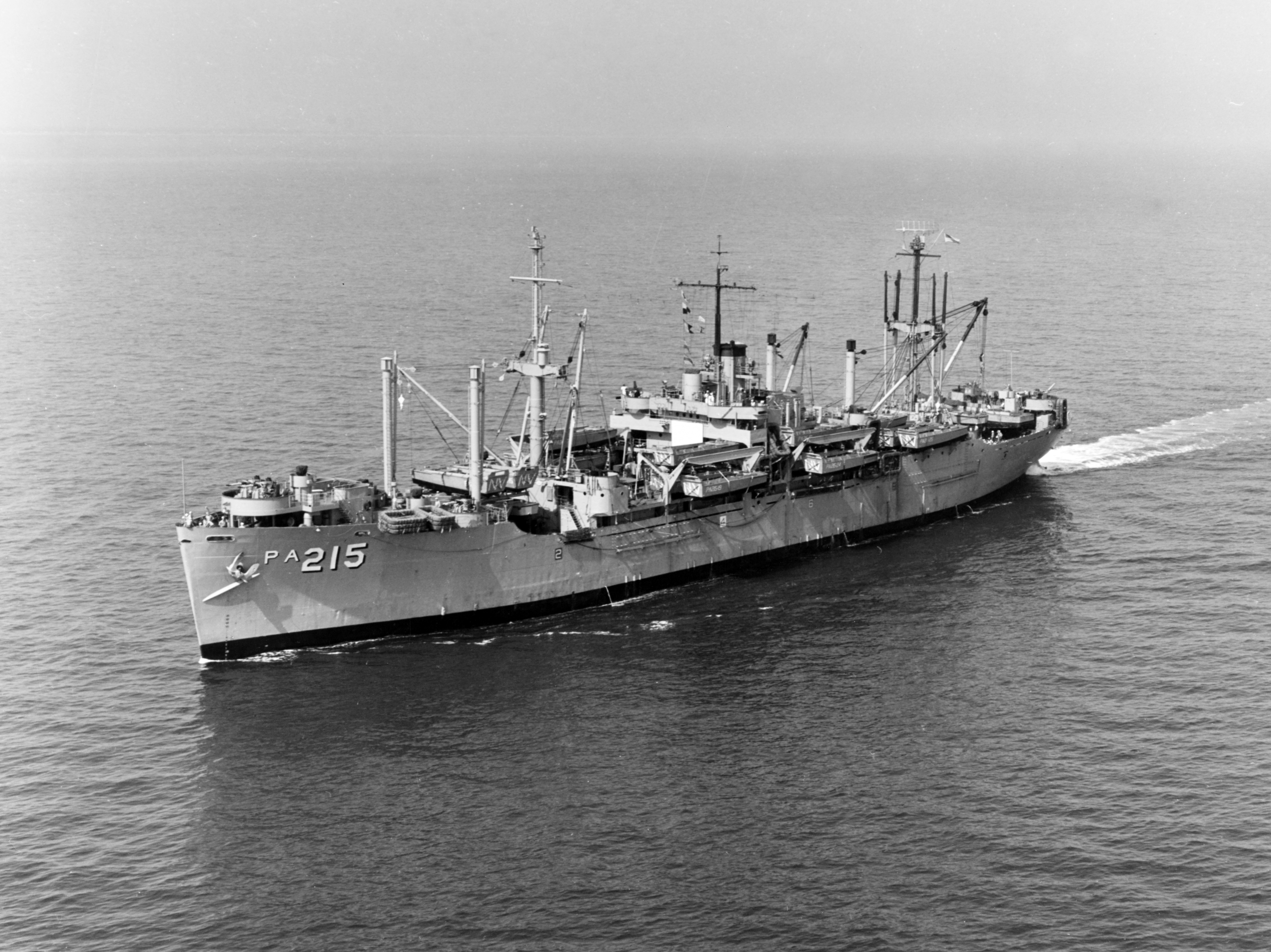
USS Navarro, which rescued the crew of Habib Marikar.

Empire Duchess departed from Southend on 19 May as a member of Convoy FN 1714, which arrived at Methil on 21 May. She left the convoy at Middlesbrough the next day. On 3 June, she departed for Southend, arriving two days later and departing the next day for Antwerp, where she arrived on 7 June. She departed on 13 June and arrived at the Clyde four days later. On 26 July, Empire Duchess departed from the Clyde for Port Said, where she arrived on 10 August. She then sailed to Suez, Egypt, from where she departed on 15 August for Rangoon, Burma, arriving on 7 September.

On 7 August 1946, management of Empire Duchess was transferred to the Union Castle Mail Steamship Co Ltd. In 1949, Empire Duchess was sold by the Ministry of Transport to the Union Castle Mail Steamship Co Ltd, which renamed her Braemar Castle, the second ship to bear that name. Her port of registry was changed to London. In 1950, she was sold to King Line Ltd and renamed King James, still registered at London. In 1958, she was sold to the Cambay Prince Steamship Co Ltd, Hong Kong and renamed Tyne Breeze. She was operated under the management of J Manners & Co Ltd, Hong Kong. On 13 December 1959, Tyne Breeze rescued the 43 crew of the Panamanian cargo ship Eastern Lucky, which had sprung a leak off Formosa. They were taken to Hong Kong. In 1963, she was sold to the Cathay Trader Steamship Co Ltd, Hong Kong, and renamed Cathay Trader, remaining under Manners' management. In 1964, she was sold to Pacific Pearl Navigation Co Ltd, Hong Kong and renamed Pearl Light. In 1966, she was sold to Marikar Navigation & Agencies Ltd, Hong Kong and renamed Habib Marikar.

On 3 November 1967, Habib Marikar suffered a major engine breakdown whilst caught up in Typhoon Emma, at 16°37′N 113°02′E. She was on a voyage from Hong Kong to Chittagong, Bangladesh with a cargo of cement. The next day she drifted ashore on Lincoln Island, Paracel Islands (16°38′N 112°45′E), Two Landing Craft from USS Navarro rescued 43 of her 44 crew. Electronic Technician 3 Mick Ferl was awarded a Commendation for rescuing one of the crew from Habib Marikar who had fallen into the water. Those not requiring medical treatment were transferred to the Dutch merchant ship Bengalis and landed at Hong Kong. Habib Marikar was declared a constructive total loss.
