= List of governors of Trois-Rivières =

This article is a list of governors of Trois-Rivières:

| Name | Term | Sovereign |
|---|---|---|
| Sieur de Laviolette | 1634–1636 | Louis XIII |
| Marc-Antoine Brasdefer de Châteaufort | 1636–1639 | Louis XIII |
| François de Champflour | 1639–1645 | Louis XIII |
| Jacques Leneuf de La Poterie | 1645-1648 | Louis XIV |
| Charles Legardeur de Tilly | 1648–1650 | Louis XIV |
| Jacques Leneuf de La Poterie | 1650–1651 | Louis XIV |
| Guillaume Guillemot Du Plessis-Kerbodot | 1651–1652 | Louis XIV |
| Jacques Leneuf de La Poterie | 1652–1653 | Louis XIV |
| Pierre Boucher de Grosbois | 1654–1658 | Louis XIV |
| Jacques Leneuf de La Poterie | 1658–1662 | Louis XIV |
| Pierre Boucher de Grosbois | 1662–1668 | Louis XIV |
| René Gaultier de Varennes | 1668–1689 | Louis XIV |
| Claude de Ramezay | 1690–1699 | Louis XIV |
| François Provost | 1699–1702 | Louis XIV |
| Vacant post | 1702–1703 | Louis XIV |
| Antoine de Crisafy | 1703–1709 | Louis XIV |
| François de Galifet de Caffin | 1709–1720 | Louis XIV |
| Charles LeMoine, premier baron de Longueuil | 1720–1724 | Louis XV |
| François Desjordis de Saint-Georges de Cabanac | 1724–1726 | Louis XV |
| Jean Bouillet de la Chassaigne | 1726–1730 | Louis XV |
| Jean-Maurice-Josué Dubois Berthelot de Beaucours | 1730–1733 | Louis XV |
| Pierre Rigaud de Vaudreuil et de Cavagnal | 1733–1742 | Louis XV |
| Claude-Michel Bégon de la Cour | 1742–1748 | Louis XV |
| François-Pierre Rigaud de Vaudreuil | 1748–1757 | Louis XV |
| Paul-Joseph Le Moyne de Longueuil | 1757–1760 | Louis XV |
| Ralph Burton | 1760–1762 | George III |
| Frederick Haldimand | 1762–1764 | George III |

On August 10, 1764, eighteen months after the signing of the Treaty of Paris, the post of Governor of Trois-Rivières was abolished.

== See also ==
- Governor of Montreal
- Governor of Acadia
- Governor of Sailplane
- Governor of Louisiana

== Sources ==
- (in French) Trois-Rivières (division_administrative_seigneuriale), in the site La mémoire du Québec
