= Quebec Route 157 =

Highway in Quebec, Canada

Route 157

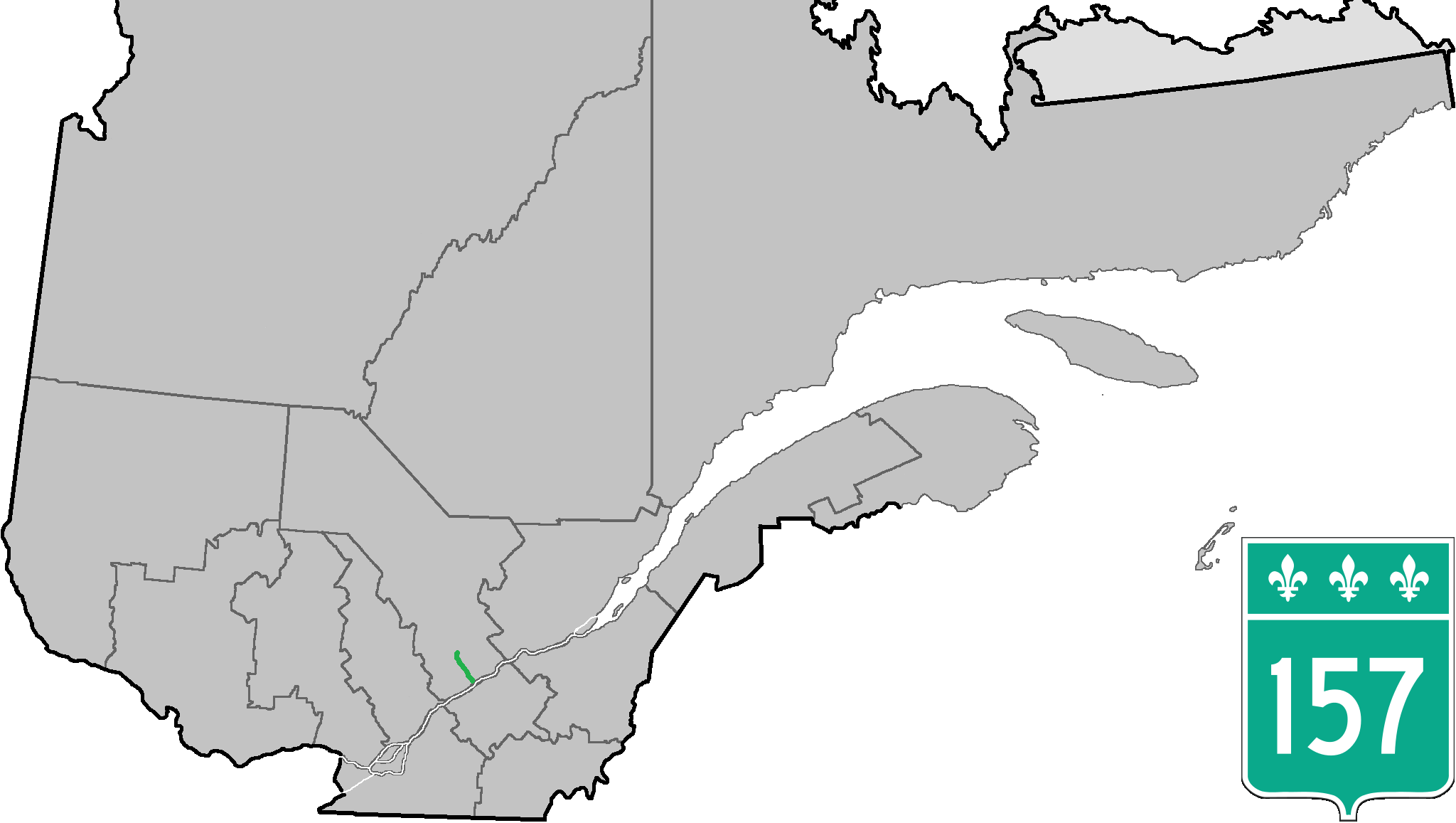

Route information
- Maintained by Transports Québec
- Length: 28.3 km (17.6 mi)

Major junctions
- South end: R-138 in Trois-Rivières (Cap-de-la-Madeleine)
- A-40 in Cap-de-la-Madeleine
- North end: R-153 in Shawinigan

Location
- Country: Canada
- Province: Quebec
- Major cities: Trois-Rivières, Shawinigan

Highway system
- Quebec provincial highways; Autoroutes; List; Former
← R-155	→ R-158

Route 157 is a four-lane north–south highway on the north shore of the Saint Lawrence River in Quebec, Canada. Its northern terminus is in Shawinigan at the junction of Route 153, and the southern terminus is at the junction of Route 138 in Cap-de-la-Madeleine, now part of Trois-Rivières.

== Municipalities along Route 157 ==
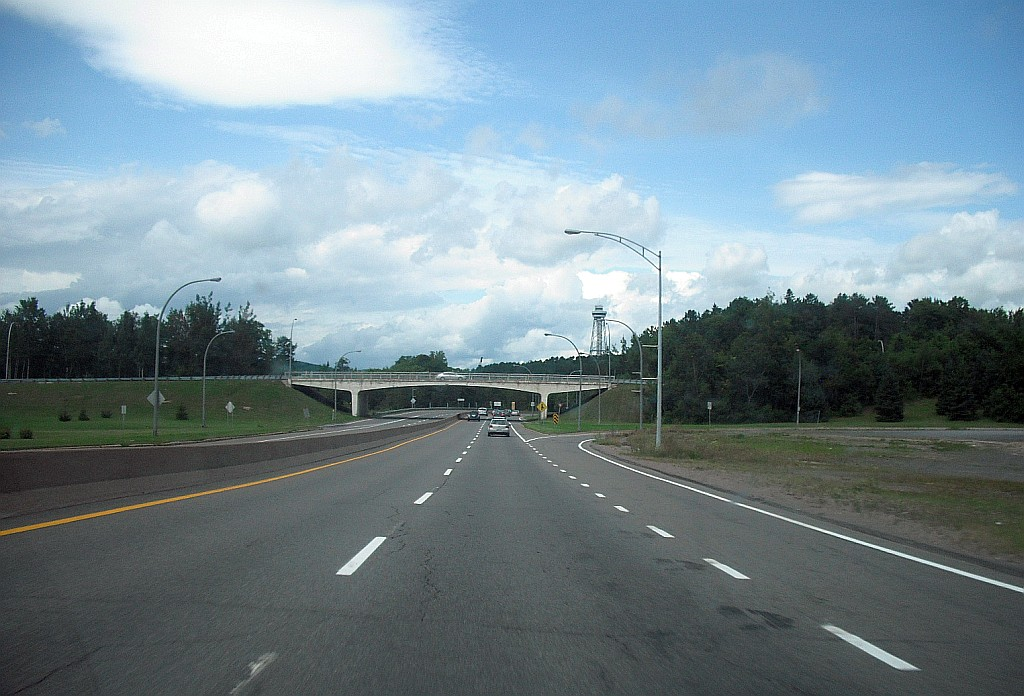
Quebec Route 157 in Shawinigan-Sud

- Trois-Rivières - (Cap-de-la-Madeleine / Saint-Louis-de-France)
- Notre-Dame-du-Mont-Carmel
- Shawinigan - (Shawinigan-Sud / Shawinigan)

== Major intersections ==
RCM or ET	Municipality	Km	Junction	Notes
Southern terminus of Route 157
Trois-Rivières		0.0	R-138	138 WEST: to Trois-Rivières; 138 EAST: to Sainte-Marthe-du-Cap
Trois-Rivières		2.2	A-40 (Exit 203)	40 WEST: to Trois-Rivières; 40 EAST: to Champlain
Shawinigan		24.8	125e Rue	EAST: to Lac-à-la-Tortue
Shawinigan		28.3	R-153	153 SOUTH: to Saint-Boniface; 153 NORTH: to Grand-Mère
Northern terminus of Route 157

== See also ==
- List of Quebec provincial highways
