= Lordship Hertel =

Coordinates: 46.4500°N 72.4167°W

The Lordship Hertel was an operating area of New France, located in the present territory of Saint-Maurice (City Parish), Les Chenaux Regional County Municipality, in Mauricie, in Quebec, in Canada.

== History ==
On December 3, 1633, the Company of New France granted to Jacques Hertel an expanse of 200 acres of land, instead of Three Rivers on the North Shore of St. Lawrence River. Hertel was born at Fécamp, Normandy, France, the son of Nicolas Hertel and Jeanne Miriot, and died August 10, 1651, at Trois-Rivières, Quebec. He was the father of Joseph-François Hertel de la Fresnière; Madeleine, b. 2 September 1645, who on 29 August 1658 married Louis Pinard, the surgeon of the fort at Trois-Rivières; and Marguerite, b. 26 August 1649, who married Jean Crevier de Saint-François, an early seigneur of Saint-François-du-Lac.

Some historians such as Pierre-Georges Roy, consider that the real extent of the lordship was rather limited to 50 acres. August 20, 1644, Messrs. Hertel and Godfrey exchanged their land. The cadastre December 1, 1860, specifies the boundaries of the fief and Hertel Linctot.

== Toponymy ==
The name "Lordship Hertel" is derived from the first Lord owner, Jacques Hertel. The name "Lordship Hertel" was officially registered 2 March 1983 with the Commission de toponymie du Québec (Geographical Names Board of Québec).

== See also ==
- Saint-Maurice, Quebec
- Les Chenaux Regional County Municipality
- Trois-Rivières
- Mauricie
- Government of Trois-Rivières
- Lordship of Champlain
- Champlain (provincial electoral district)
- St. Lawrence River
