= Government of Trois-Rivières =

The Government of Trois-Rivières was one of three administrative divisions of the French colony of Canada from 1643 to 1764, the other two being the Government of Quebec and Government of Montreal. At the time of the New France, the colony was divided into five individual governments: one in Trois-Rivières, one in Quebec City, one in Montreal, one in Newfoundland and one in Acadia. Each of these regions was known as a government because it was headed by a governor. The Government of Trois-Rivières was the smallest of the three governments of the St. Lawrence Valley in both area and population.

== History ==
It does not seem to act promulgating the creation of the three governments of Canada under the French regime (1608–1763). In this, the model here is similar to that of France. At that time, the valley of the St. Lawrence consisted of three population centres: Québec (from 1608), Trois-Rivières (from 1634) and Montreal (from 1642). It then became necessary to create three governments. In Trois-Rivières, the first captain to hold the title of governor Francois Champflour in 1643. Thus appeared the three governments of New France.

At its inception in 1643, the Government of Trois-Rivières had only one permanent establishment, the position of Trois-Rivières. Manors had been granted around (Hertel fief in 1633, Godefroy fief in 1633, lordship Jesuits in 1634 lordship of La Madeleine in 1636, Godefroy de Lintot fief in 1637, Dutort lordship in 1637, lordship of Batiscan in 1639), while others were projected (fief de l'Arbre à-la-Croix in 1644, Marsolet fief in 1644). Despite several attempts, no one lived in these lordships because of the Iroquois threat, it was not until 1665 with the arrival of the Carignan-Salières Regiment. The center of the Government of Trois-Rivières will begin on the north shore of the St. Lawrence River from Trois-Rivières down to the east, probably for the sole reason that the rest of the country was in a flood zone. Trois-Rivières is the first occupied, followed by Cap-de-la-Madeleine little after 1640, the Champlain from 1664 or 1665, the Batiscan to 1666 and Sainte-Anne-de-la-Pérade from 1667.

In 1648, the governor of Trois-Rivières became a member of the Council of Quebec, created the previous year. In 1651, the Government of Trois-Rivières has a Seneschal (court), which like back in France, the post of high judge was held by a civil officer called a Lieutenant-General.

The government of Trois-Rivières was maintained by the British during the military regime (1760–1764), with the difference that during this period, each government is autonomous and was not submitted to the Quebec Governor. Each government resorted to a currency of a different course, and required a passport for entry and exit. The two boundaries separating the three governments were a crossing equipped with a garrison: one in Sainte-Anne-de-la-Joliette, between the Governments of Québec and Trois-Rivières, and the other Maskinongé, between governments of Trois-Rivières and Montreal.

The government of Trois-Rivières was abolished on 10 August 1764, when the British replaced the three governments with two districts, one in Quebec and the other Montreal. The Saint-Maurice River marked the division between the two districts.

== Territory ==
The government of Trois-Rivières extended from Sainte-Anne-de-la-Pérade to Maskinongé on the north shore of the St. Lawrence River, and Saint-Pierre-les-Becquets to Yamaska on the south shore. It was the closest of the three government contracts.

In the north, it extended vaguely to land surrounding the Hudson Bay, and south to New England.

These limits had not been set at the creation of the government in 1643. The size of the government was expanded for the area of the Trois-Rivières government extending between that of the Government of Quebec and the Government of Montreal.

Its territory corresponds to the current regions of the Mauricie and Centre-du-Québec. It also included the eastern part of the Townships.

=== Lordships ===
The Government of Trois-Rivières had up to 51 fiefs and lordships.

Thirty-four (34) lordships on the North Shore: 1. Sainte-Anne-East 2. Sainte-Anne-West 3. Sainte-Marie 4. Batiscan 5. Champlain 6. Cap-de-la-Madeleine 7–10. Islands of Saint-Maurice (Island Pigs or Pottery, St. Kitts, St. Joseph Island, Trinidad and Saint-Quentin) 11. Hertel 12. High-Boc 13. Niverville 14 Commune. 15. Coteau St. Louis 16. Sainte-Marguerite 17. Jesuits 18. Vieuxpont 19. Labadie 20. Boucher 21. Tonnancour 22. Saint-Maurice 23. Gastineau 24. Robert 25. Grosbois East 26. Grosbois West 27. Dumontier 28. Grandpre 29. Rivière-du-Loup 30. St. John 31. Maskinongé 32. Carufel 33. Dusablé 34. Lac Maskinongé

Seventeen (17) lordships on the south shore: 35. Yamaska 36. St. Francis 37. Lussaudière 38. Pierreville 39. Deguire 40. Baie-du-Febvre 41. Courval 42. Nicolet 43. Ile Moras 44. Roquetaillade 45. Godefroy 46. Marie Island 47. Bécancour 48. Dutort 49. Cournoyer 50. Gentilly 51. Lévrard

Out of 51 of these lordships, there were only two stately homes on the north shore (Cap-de-la-Madeleine and Niverville), and one on the south shore (Lévrard). As for the manorial mills, there remained only three on the north shore (Commune, Pointe-du-Lac Saint-Jean) and one on the south shore (Gentilly).

=== Parishes ===
From 1608 to 1764, these 51 manors, appeared eighteen (18) parishes and two missions.

Eleven (11) parishes on the North Shore:

1. Sainte-Anne 2. Batiscan 3. Sainte-Geneviève 4. Champlain 5. Cap-de-la-Madeleine 6. Trois-Rivières 7. Les Forges 8. Pointe-du-Lac 9. Yamachiche 10. Rivière-du-Loup 11. Maskinongé

Seven (7) parishes and two Native American missions on the south side:

12. Yamaska 13. Saint-François-du-lac 14. Mission St. Francis (current Odanak) 15. Baie-du-Febvre 16. Nicolet 17. Bécancour 18. Mission Bécancour (current Wolinak) 19. Gentilly 20. Saint-Pierre-les-Becquets

Each of these twenty parishes had its church and rectory. There are only two churches dating from the French regime (Cap-de-la-Madeleine 1715 and Recollects Anglicans-1754) and no parsonage. If the buildings no longer exist, there are works of art of this period in Sainte-Anne, Batiscan, Champlain, Cap-de-la-Madeleine, Trois-Rivières, Maskinongé, Saint-François-du-Lac and Gentilly.

== Organisation ==
A series of high and minor officials was appointed to assume the organization of each government. In particular governor (in Quebec, it was the Governor General), and a king's lieutenant to attend a sub-delegated steward (the commissary or the Commissioner of the Navy or the general-voyer or warehouseman), a staff, guards for the governor and main building, with a Court of Justice judge (called a Lieutenant-General, not to be confused with the military rank of the same name), assistant prosecutor, clerk, notary, judge a castle to house the governor and his staff. Officers Staff have real rights and honorary rights.

== Governors ==
To ensure the unity of the colony, individual governors of Trois-Rivières and Montreal were in effect subordinate to the Governor General so that they were, in fact, Lieutenant Governors.

The first to hold the title is Governor Francis Champflour in 1643. Those above on the list bore the title of captain.

== Lieutenants of the King (Lieutenants de roi) ==
According to Pierre-Georges Roy, "The King's lieutenants were individual lieutenant-governors. They occupied most of the military part of the troops and fortifications and suppléaient governors in their absence".

- Jacques L'Hermitte, March 10, 1715
- François Mariaucheau of Esgly, April 23, 1726
- Claude-Michel Begon, February 6, 1731
- François de Gannes de Falaise, April 1, 1732
- Louis Lienard de Beaujeu, May 31, 1743
- Peter Knight of Saint-Ours, February 1748
- Michel de Gannes de Falaise, April 1, 1752
- Charles Joseph Ailleboust, April 1, 1754
- Pierre-Jacques Chavoy Noyan, April 1, 1756
- Nicolas-Joseph Levi Coffey, on January 1, 1759

== Majors ==
According to Pierre-Georges Roy, majors " were in charge of the police troops and saw the details of the military administration."

- Lambert Boucher de Grandpre, 1692
- Louis de la Porte de Louvigny, April 29, 1700
- Michel Godefroy de Linctot, April 1, 1702
- Raymond Blaise des Bergeres, May 5, 1710
- Joseph Dejordy Cabanac, June 18, 1712
- Jean-Louis Horn, 12 May 1714
- François Mariaucheau of Esgly, January 2, 1716
- François Moreau Desjordy Cabanac, May 7, 1720
- François de Gannes de Falaise, 11 April 1727
- Constant Lemarchand of Lignery, March 16, 1728
- Jacques-Charles Renaud Dubuisson, April 1, 1733
- François-Pierre de Rigaud de Vaudreuil, May 1741
- Nicolas-Antoine Coulon de Villiers, February 1748
- Nicolas-Joseph Fleurimont Noyelles, June 1754
- Charles Sabrevois, on January 1, 1759

== Castles of the Governor ==
- 1643–1652, Fort or Housing Plato built in 1636, the second peak of Trois-Rivières. It consisted of two main buildings, a shop and a platform. It was located at the southern tip of Plato. This is where Pierre Boucher signed his orders before 1653.
- 1653–1655, Maison Pierre Boucher: location acquired in 1653 on Saint-Pierre
- 1655–1677, Place du Gouverneur location acquired by Pierre Boucher 1655 to accommodate the place of the governor. His son René Gaultier de Varennes lived there until 1677 or 1679. It was located at the corner of present streets Barracks and Ursulines. This is the current Place Pierre-Boucher.
- 1677–1693, Varennes House built between 1677 and 1679, the house was demolished Varennes in 1714 or shortly after. It was the residence of the governors René Gaultier de Varennes 1677/79, 1689, then Claude de Ramezay from 1690 to 1693. It was located at the rear of the current Anglican church. It was a wooden house on a floor. La Verendrye Park, which now occupies the site of this house is part of the archaeological site CCFD-20. This part of the site CCFD-20 was the subject of six archaeological operations: 1983 (Cardinal and McGain 1984), 2003 (2004 Archéotec) in September 2009 (Gilbert 2010) in September 2010 (Gilbert 2011) in September 2011 (Gilbert 2012) and September 2012 (Gilbert, to paraîte 2013).
- 1693–1723, Governors Residence: in 1693, the Governor Claude de Ramezay built the new governor's residence in 1693 on the Plato site current post office.
- 1723–1764, Plato Castle: Built in 1723 by Chaussegros Lery on the same site as the residence in 1693 it was destroyed by fire in 1908. This house was called "king's house" because it belonged to the state, or "Castle of Plato". Governor Haldimand, who renovation, let it "the most beautiful garden of Canada".

== Staff of the castle ==
- Heather John, secretary of government, from 1760 to October 1763
- Conrad Gugy, Secretary of Government, from October 1763 to 1764

== Captain of the garrison of Trois-Rivières ==
- Pézard Étienne de la Touche, until June 20, 1664
- Captain Arnault Tarey, Sieur de Laubias, commander of the garrison, he arrived in Trois-Rivières in September 1665 until June 10, 1668
- Jacques Labadie commanded the garrison of Trois-Rivières, with the rank of Sergeant, 16 November 1671 (1684 Jette ?). Arcouet Jean dit Lajeunesse is one of the soldiers of the garrison of Trois-Rivières in 1671
- The garrison has one officer and seven soldiers in 1685.
- Louis-François de Galifet commander in 1689-1691

== Population ==
Table of the population of the three governments from 1666 to 1765.
	Government Filmography Quebec	Government Filmography Trois-Rivières	Government Filmography Montreal	Total
1666	2135	455	625	3215
1688	6223	1406	2674	10303
1698	8981	1590	3244	13815
1739	23337	3352	17012	42701
1765	35913	7313	26584	69810
Source: Data from 1666, 1688 and 1698, Hubert Charbonneau, Life and Death of our ancestors, Demographic Study, Montreal, University Press of Montreal, 1975, page 40 / data from 1739 and 1765, censuses of Canada 1666 to 1871, vol. 4, Ottawa, 1876.

== See also ==
- Government of Canada
- List of governors of Quebec
- Government of Montreal
- List of governors of Montreal

== Annexes ==
=== Bibliography ===
- René Beaudoin, "The Origins of the regional capital", in René Beaudoin (eds.), Meet Trois-Rivières, 375 years of history and culture, Trois-Rivières, art Éditions Le Sabord 2009, pages 73–74 (ISBN 978-2-922685-67-1)
- René Beaudoin, "One of the most beautiful places in the country", in René Beaudoin (eds.), Meet Trois-Rivières, 375 years of history and culture, Trois-Rivières, Editions of s The Sabord 2009, pp. 75–85 (ISBN 978-2-922685-67-1).
- Daniel Robert, "Birth of Three River", trifluvian Heritage, Annual Bulletin of history Conservation Society and animation heritage Trois-Rivières, Number 7, June 1997, pages 6–11 (ISSN|1187-2713).
- Pierre-Georges Roy, Officers Staff governments of Quebec, Montreal and Trois-Rivières: under French rule, Lévis (Quebec), sn, 1919
- Pierre-Georges Roy, "Census of the inhabitants of the town and government of Three Rivers (to 1760)", Report of the Archivist of the Province of Quebec for the year 1946-1947, Quebec, Redempti Paradis, 1946, pp. 5–53 (online at Our Roots)
- Guy Trépanier, Three Rivers, Historic District Study of archaeological potential, Trois-Rivières, Ministry of Cultural Affairs and the City of Trois-Rivières, 1981
- Marcel Trudel, New France by text, frames of life, Montreal, HMH, 2003 (Les Cahiers du Quebec, QC 134 History Collection) (ISBN 2-89428-633-3).
- Marcel Trudel, History of New France, volume 10, The military regime and the disappearance of New France, 1759-1764, Montreal, Fides, 1999 (ISBN 2-7621-2062-4).
- Marcel Trudel, Atlas of New France, Québec, Presses de l'Université Laval, 1973 (ISBN 0-7746-6402-9).
- Marcel Trudel, Introduction to New France, Montreal, Editions Holt, Rinehart and Winston, 1971. (ISBN 0-03-925711-8)
- Marcel Trudel, The military regime in the government of Trois-Rivières 1760-1764, Trois-Rivières, Éditions du Bien Public, 1952 (Regional History Collection, No. 8)

=== External links ===
- Jacques Viger, military Reign in Canada, 1870, pages 145–307. Google books
