= Gallifet =

Gallifet or Galiffet may refer to:

== People with the surname ==
- François de Galiffet de Caffin (1666 – 1746), French military officer.
- Gaston Alexandre Auguste, Marquis de Galliffet, Prince de Martigues (1830–1909), French general.
- Joseph de Gallifet (1663–1749), French Jesuit priest.
- Joseph d'Honon de Gallifet (d. 1706), French colonial administrator.

== Other ==
- Hôtel de Galliffet, a townhouse in Paris, France.
- Gallifet trousers, riding breeches-style trousers of Soviet military uniform
