= Antoine de Crisafy =

Antoine de Crisafy (died May 1709) was an officer in the colonial regular troops of New France. He served as governor of Trois-Rivières from 1703 to 1709.

The son of Mathieu de Crisafi and Françoise de Grimaldi, he was born in Messina in Sicily. Don Antonio Crisafi and his brother Thomas, who had a good military background, as he had become Knight of Malta in 1670, took part in a revolt against Spain in Sicily. The important city of Messina had at that time (1674–1678) about 100,000 inhabitants and was a dynamic port with a strategic position in the Mediterranean sea. When the senate of Messina decided to revolt against Spain, the Crisafi brothers were among the military leaders organising the defence. In 1675, Messina obtained the military support of France which was in war against Spain, and the Crisafi brothers continued fighting under the orders of the Duke of Vivonne, the commander of the French troops and a noble who was very close to King Louis XIV. Messina was able to resist against Spain and the French fleet was able to win some important naval battles against the combined fleet of Spain and Holland. But, in 1678, Louis XIV concluded the peace of Nimega and Messina was abandoned in the hands of the Spaniards. Antoine and Thomas Crisafy, like a lot of nobles of Messina, had to flee to France, leaving their assets behind. Since that time they changed their name in Crisafy, according to the French pronunciation. Probably thanks to their connection with the Duke of Vivonne, they were received in Versailles and obtained a little pension from the Sun King. They were eventually accused of a complot against France and were imprisoned for a short time at La Bastille, in Paris, before being freed as they were found to be innocent. Then, in April 1684, Louis XIV decided to name them captains and each led a company of the seven that were sent to New France in that year. Despite their difficulty to adapt to the Canadian cold climate, they were among the most brave and capable officers in Canada as confirmed in several letters sent by the Governors of New France to Versailles. In Canada, the Crisafy brothers had the chance to meet Henry de Tonty, the officer of Italian origins whose name is linked to Cavelier de la Salle in the exploration of the Mississippi river and the land of the Indian Illinois. In 1686, they took part with governor de Denonville in the expedition against the Iroquois at Niagara. In 1692, Antoine was given charge of the troops at Sault-Saint-Louis and was able to fend off an attack by 800 Iroquois. In 1696, Thomas died, leaving a very good memory for his personal qualities. Very close to Governor de Calliere, Antoine Crisafy was named king's lieutenant at Montreal in 1697 and, the following year, appointed Knight of the Order of Saint-Louis. In 1699, he was named king's lieutenant at Quebec City. He married Marie-Claire, the daughter of François-Madeleine-Fortuné Ruette d'Auteuil de Monceaux in 1700. Following the death of François Provost, he became governor at Trois-Rivières. Crisafy died in office and was buried there on May 6, 1709. Neither Antoine nor Thomas had children and they did not become French citizens.
