= Saint-Louis-de-France =

Sector of Trois-Rivières

Coordinates: 46°25′20″N 72°37′31.7″W

Saint-Louis-de-France (French pronunciation: [sɛ̃ lwi də fʁɑ̃s]) was one of the six sectors of the City of Trois-Rivières. Prior to January 1, 2002 it was a city in Quebec of about 7,246 inhabitants. During the Quebec municipal reorganizations of 2002, it was amalgamated with the municipalities of Sainte-Marthe-du-Cap, Cap-de-la-Madeleine, Trois-Rivières, Trois-Rivières-Ouest and Pointe-du-Lac, to form the current town of Trois-Rivières.

== History ==
Founded in 1904, it had the status of a parish municipality from 1904 to 1993 and then a city from 1993 to 2002.

Saint-Louis-de-France (secteur), Trois-Rivières City

. . . It is argued that Saint-Louis-de-France (1214-1270) being the first holder of the former mission of the Vieilles-Forges (1740), to which Saint-Louis-de-France once belonged, renamed in 1921 Saint-Michel-Archange-des-Forges, sometimes Saint-Michel-Archange-des-Vieilles-Forges, it is for this reason that his name was transplanted to the parish on whose territory the Forges du Saint-Maurice began their activities in 1738. Canonized in 1297, Louis IX demonstrated a great spirit of peace and piety.

. . . However, account may also have been taken of the fact that the bishop of Trois-Rivières, Monseigneur Laflèche (1818-1898), to whom petitions were submitted to open a new parish, was Louis-François. According to another explanation, Saint-Louis-de-France would constitute a calque of Saint-Louis-des-Français, name of the French national church of Rome. — Source: Trois-Rivières, origine et signification,

== Photos ==
Trois-Rivières, Saint-Louis-de-France (secteur)

Champlain River

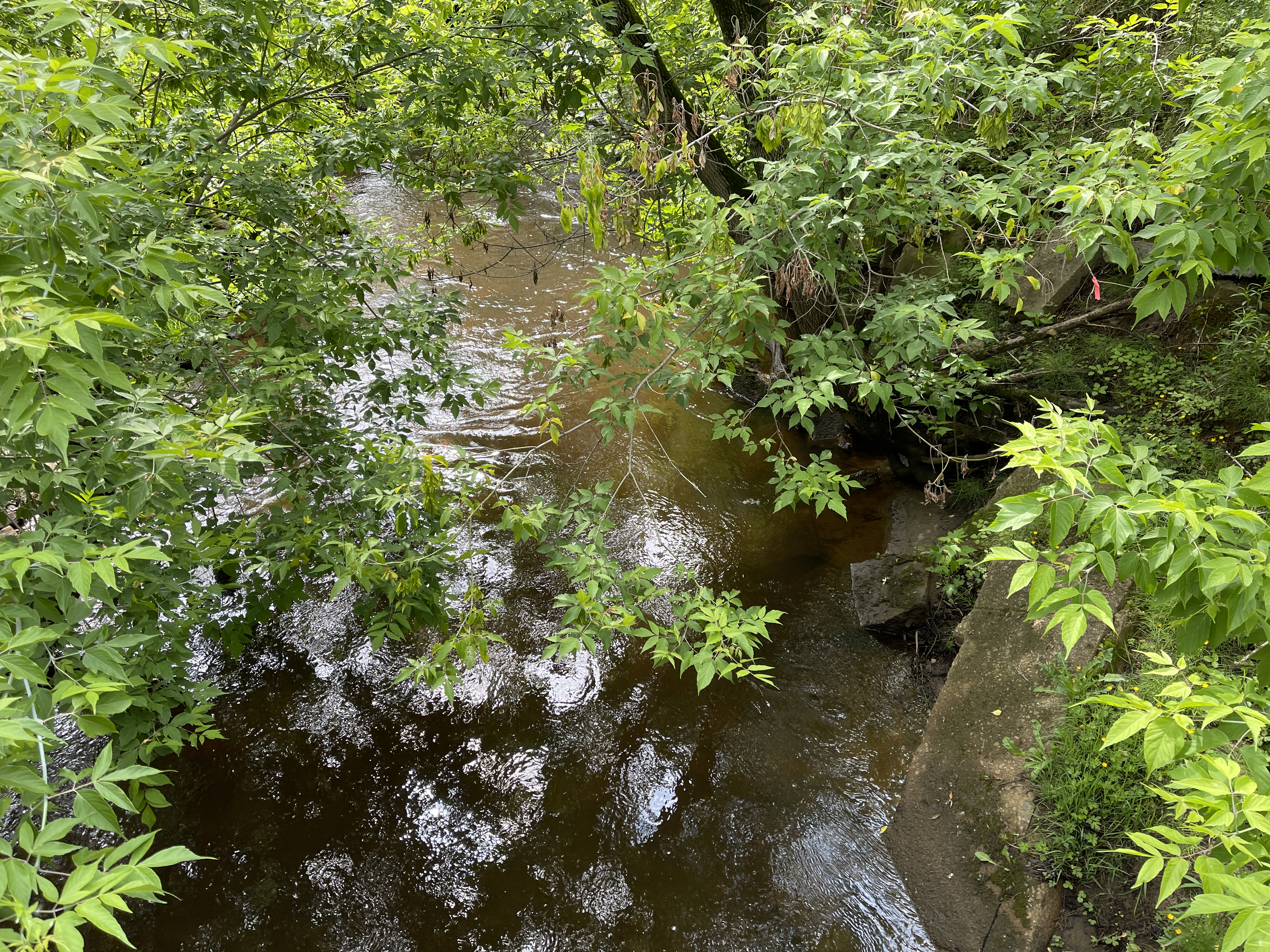
Bridge P10294, Saint-Alexis street

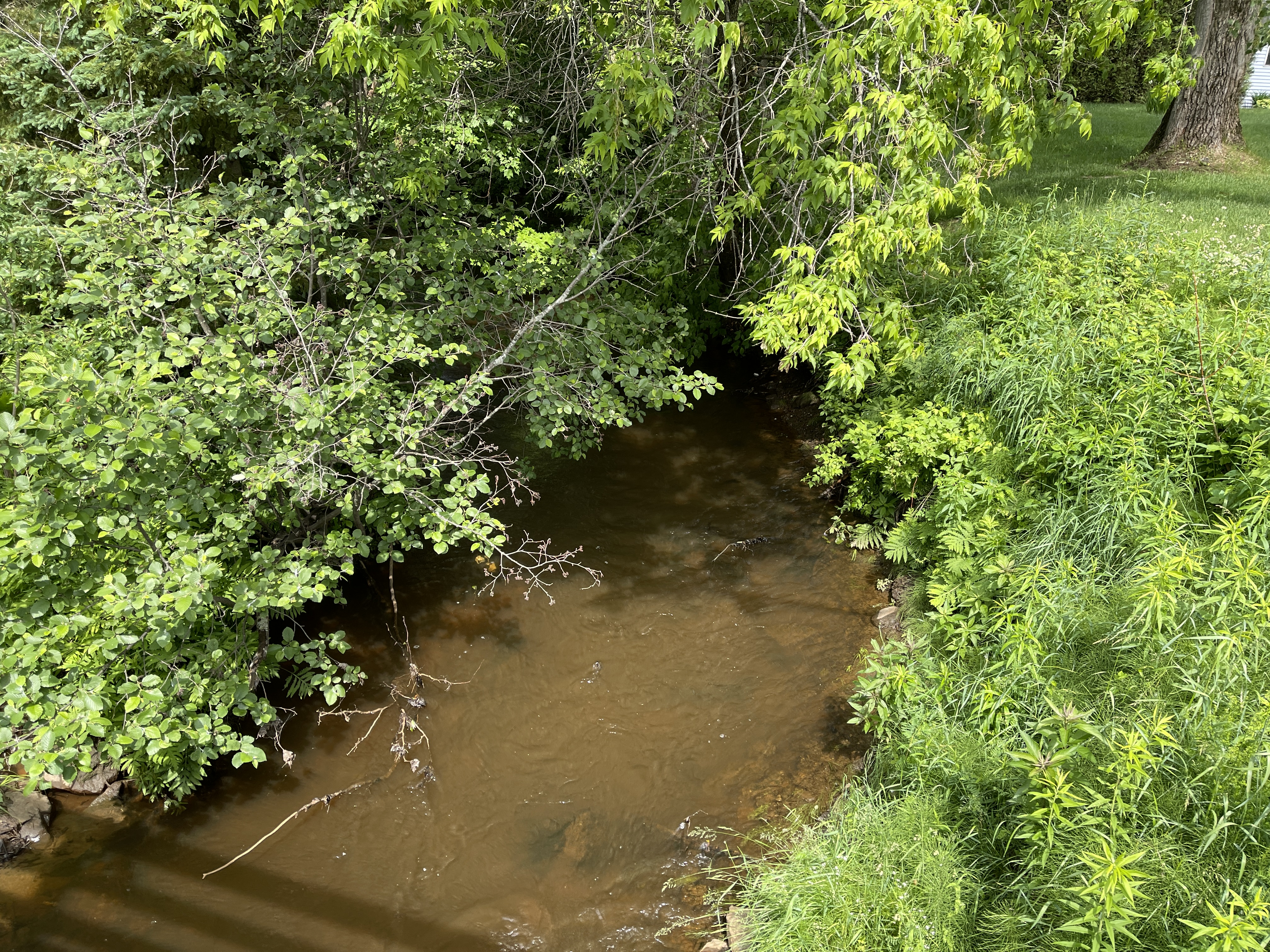
Bridge P10294, Saint-Alexis street

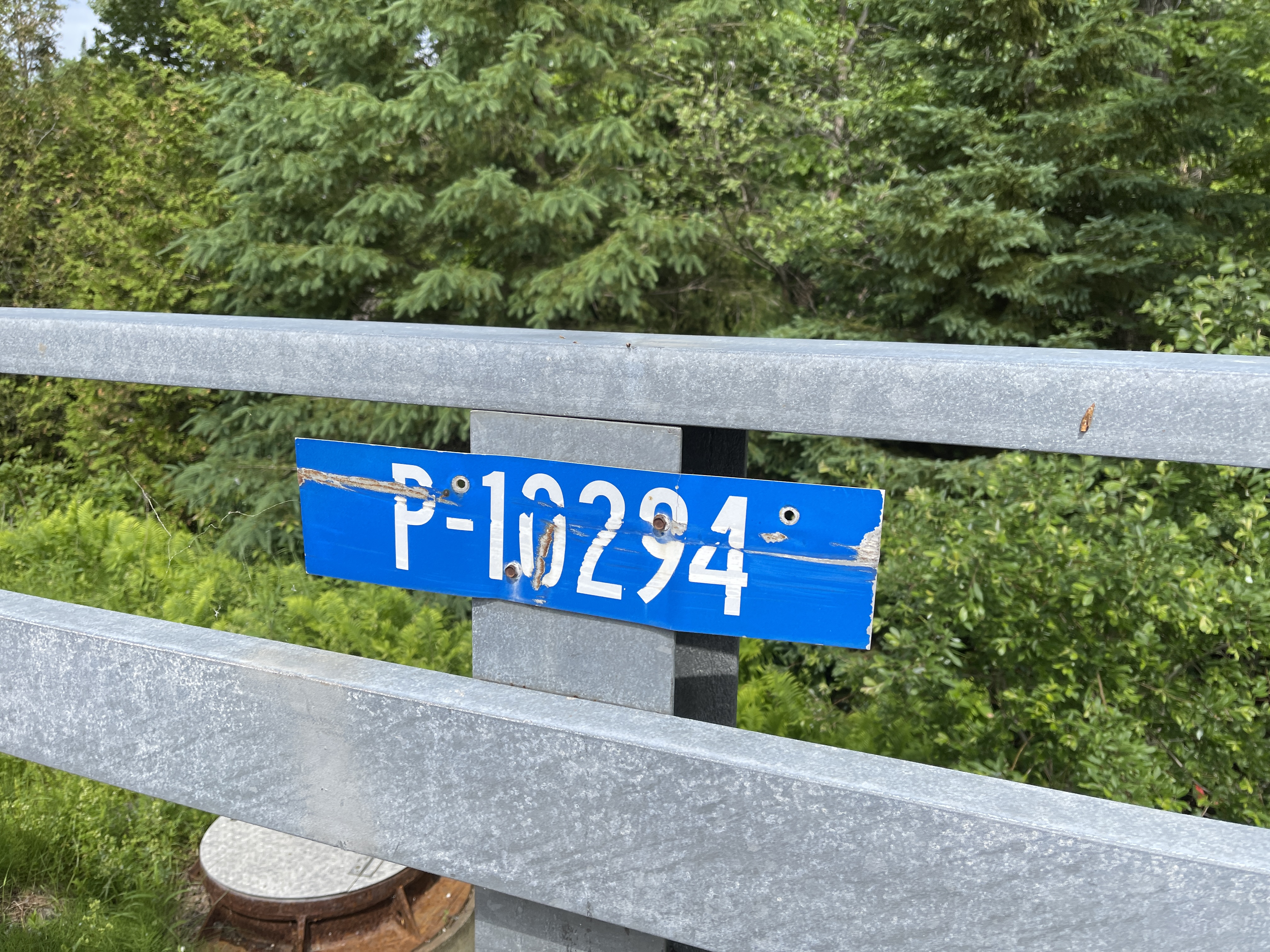
Panel bridge P10294, Saint-Alexis street
