= Frederick Montizambert =

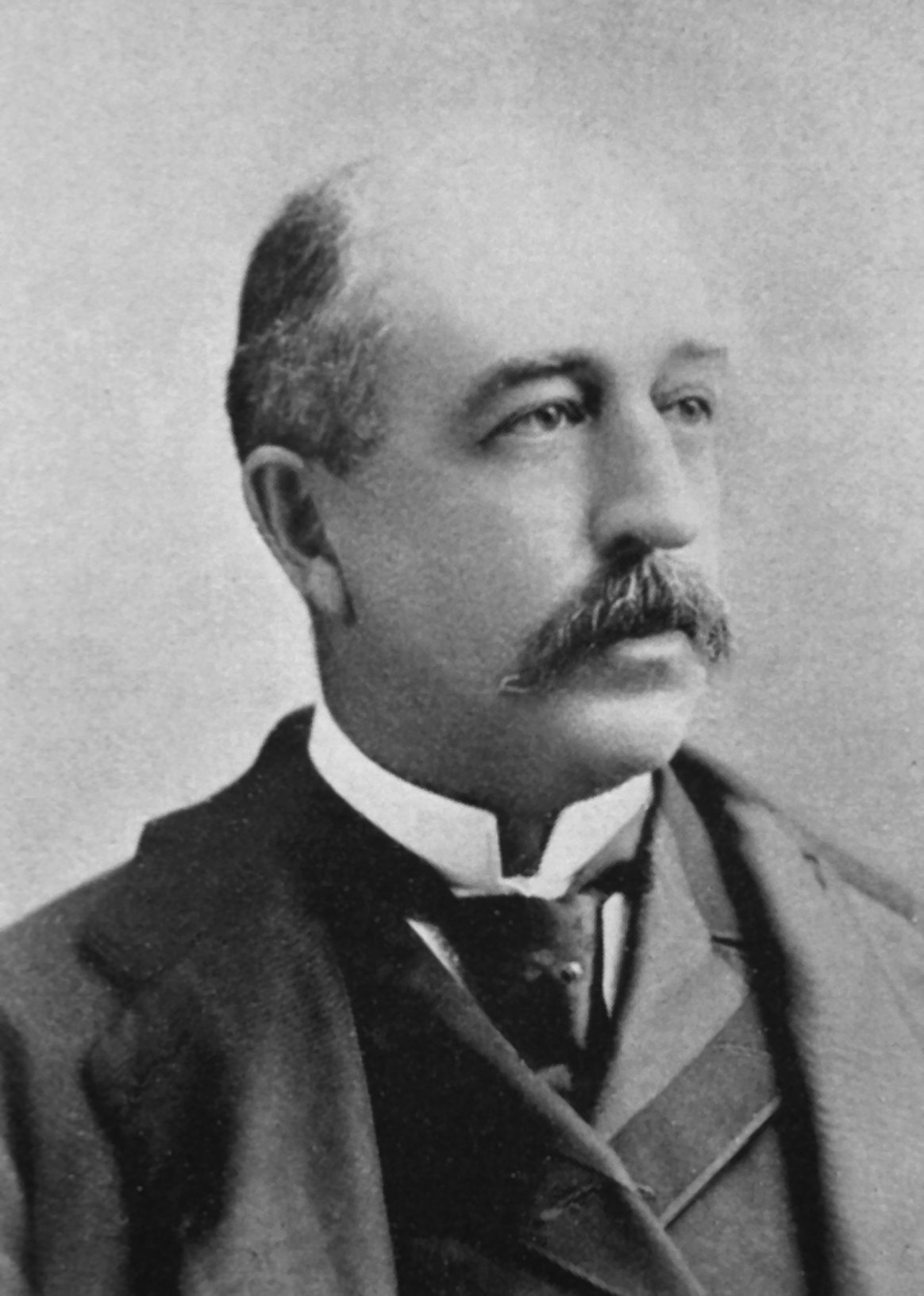
- Born: February 3, 1843; Quebec City, Canada East
- Died: November 2, 1929 (aged 86); Ottawa, Ontario, Canada
- Known for: Work in public health

Frederick Montizambert CMG ISO (February 3, 1843 – November 2, 1929) was a Canadian physician and civil servant. He was the first Director General of Public Health in Canada.

Born in Quebec City, Canada East, the son of Edward Lewis Montizambert and Lucy Bowen, Montizambert was a descendant of Pierre Boucher and his grandfather was Edward Bowen. Montizambert was educated at the High School of Montreal and at Upper Canada College from 1856 to 1859. He studied medicine at Université Laval from 1859 to 1861 and then studied at the University of Edinburgh for three years receiving his MD in 1865. He returned to Quebec in 1865 and married Mary Jane Walker, the daughter of William Walker who was a member of the Legislative Council of Quebec from 1842 to 1863.

He was not interested in private practice but rather worked in public health as the medical director at the Grosse Isle quarantine station. Starting in 1866, he held the post for thirty years. In 1894, he was also appointed to be superintendent of Canadian quarantine stations. In 1899, he was appointed Director General of Public Health in Canada. He retired in 1920.

In 1867, he joined the Canadian Medical Association and was its president from 1907 to 1908. In 1890, he was elected President of the American Public Health Association.

He was made a companion of the Imperial Service Order in 1903 and a companion of the Order of St Michael and St George in 1916. In 2001, he was inducted into the Canadian Medical Hall of Fame.
