= René Gaultier de Varennes =

Canadian politician

René Gaultier de Varennes (c 1635 – 4 June 1689) is best known in Canadian history as being one of the early governors of Trois-Rivières, Quebec and the father of Pierre Gaultier de Varennes, sieur de La Vérendrye, a famous explorer and fur trader. Part of the Ancien Régime, the Gaultier family of aristocrats came from the Anjou area of France.

René married the daughter of Pierre Boucher, the governor of Trois-Rivières in 1667 and part of the marriage contract contained a request to the governor of New France, Daniel de Rémy de Courcelle, that he should retain the office and the privileges of his father-in-law when Boucher retired. Boucher did retire in 1667 and René became governor.

He died in 1689 in the parish of l’Immaculée-Conception near Trois-Rivières.
