= Claude-Michel Bégon de la Cour =

French military officer and governor

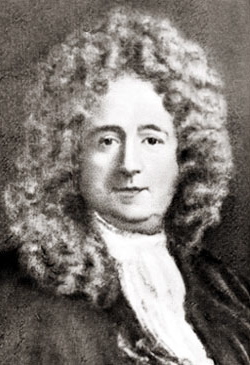
Claude-Michel Bégon de la Cour

Claude-Michel Bégon de la Cour (March 15, 1683 – April 30, 1748) was a French military officer in the colonial regular troops and a governor of Trois-Rivières.

== Life ==
Claude-Michel was the brother of Michel Bégon de la Picardière and they came to Canada together in 1713. Their father was Michel V Bégon who was intendant de la marine at the port of Rochefort and intendant of the généralité of La Rochelle. It was through the father's influence that Michel had been appointed intendant of New France and Claude-Michel had risen quickly in his military career.

Claude-Michel Bégon came to New France and was promoted to full captain with command of a company of troops in the Montreal garrison and, in 1714, he was made a naval lieutenant. In 1718, against his family's advice, he married Marie-Elisabeth Rocbert, the daughter of the garde magasin of Montréal. While this marriage did not appear to affect his career in Canada, it probably closed the door to a rising career in France like his brother Michel who left for France in 1726. That year, he was promoted to town major of Quebec City and Governor Beauharnois had him lead an attempt to expel the English from Fort Oswego on Lake Ontario. His negotiations were unsuccessful.

In 1743, Bégon became the governor of Trois-Rivières where he served until his death.
