= Michel Leneuf de la Vallière de Beaubassin =

Governor of Acadia and Seigneur of Beaubassin

Michel Le Neuf de la Vallière de Beaubassin (the elder) (French pronunciation: [miʃɛl lənœf də la valjɛʁ də bobasɛ̃]; 1640–1705) was a military figure who became a governor of Acadia under French control. He was the son of Jacques Leneuf de La Poterie and Marguerite Legardeur, who both originally came from Normandy and together with their extended families settled in Canada.

The Le Neuf family came from Caen, France, and settled in Trois-Rivières, Canada, in 1636. They were the first nobles to settle in New France and held positions of power and prestige through several generations.
