= Jacques Leneuf de La Poterie =

Governor of Trois-Rivières
- In office 1645–1648
- Monarch: Louis XIV
- Succeeded by: Pierre Boucher
- In office 1649–1651
- Monarch: Louis XIV

Personal details
- Born: November 7, 1604 Caen, Normandy, France
- Died: November 4, 1676 (aged 72)
- Occupation: settler, fur merchant, governor
- Known for: Co-founder and director of Communaute des habitants

Jacques Leneuf de La Poterie (French pronunciation: [ʒak lənœf də la pɔtʁi]; November 7, 1604, in Caen, Normandy - died some time after November 4, 1687, in Canada) was a fur merchant, businessman, seigneur, and co-founder and director of the Communauté des habitants, in the colony of Canada. He arrived in the colony in 1636 with the rest of his family, which included his elder brother Michel Leneuf, and together they, alongside their in-laws the Legardeurs, were the first of the French nobility to permanently settle in New France.

He married Marguerite, the sister of Pierre Legardeur de Repentigny, while in France, and they were the parents of several children, including the future Governor of Acadia, Michel Leneuf de La Vallière et de Beaubassin.

== Biography ==
He acquired and was granted several fiefs, and became one of the principal landholders and businessman in Canada, alongside his elder brother Michel. They both were two of the twelve co-founders and directors of the Communauté des Habitants, which was a fur company that attempted to succeed the Company of One Hundred Associates in 1645, but reverted under direct control of the Crown after two years.

He was appointed regional Governor of Trois-Rivières several times: November 7, 1645 to September 2, 1648; September 9, 1649 to August 21, 1651; September 8, 1652 to July 16, 1653; and from July 1658 to 1662. He then went on to become the lieutenant and right-hand man to the Governor General of Canada and fellow Norman Augustin de Saffray who, on his deathbed, named Jacques to "be his lieutenant upon his demise."

At the death of de Saffray on May 6, 1665, Jacques registered his commission to succeed as Governor, but the Sovereign Council voted to block the full authority of the office, ruling that only the King could name a Governor, and granted him power over the Militia only, which he oversaw until the arrival of the next royal appointment from France, Daniel de Rémy, in September of the same year.

He eventually settled his disputes with the Sovereign Council, and his son Michel would end up being one of the leading military commanders and government officials in Acadia. Jacques died in Canada some time after November 4, 1687.
