= Pierre Boucher =

French governor in New France (1622–1717)

Pierre Boucher de Boucherville
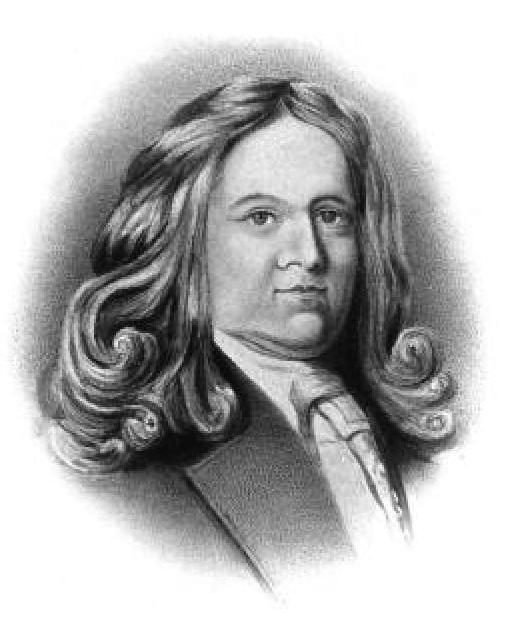
- Pierre Boucher

Governor of Trois-Rivières
- In office 1653–1658
- Monarch: Louis XIV
- Preceded by: Jacques Leneuf de la Poterie
- Succeeded by: Jacques Leneuf de la Poterie
- In office 1662–1667
- Monarch: Louis XIV
- Preceded by: Jacques Leneuf de la Poterie
- Succeeded by: René Gaultier de Varennes

Personal details
- Born: Pierre Boucher born and baptized August 1, 1622 Mortagne-au-Perche, France
- Died: April 19, 1717 (aged 94) Boucherville, Canada
- Occupation: settler, soldier, governor, naturalist, historian
- Known for: L'histoire veritable et naturelle des moeurs et productions du pays de la Nouvelle-France, vulgairement dite le Canada, Governor of Trois-Rivières

Pierre Boucher de Boucherville (born Pierre Boucher [pjɛʁ buʃe]; 1 August 1622 – 19 April 1717) was a French settler, soldier, officer, naturalist, official, governor, and ennobled aristocrat in Nouvelle-France or New France (in what is now Canada). He is a direct ancestor of Pope Leo XIV.

== Early life ==
Pierre was born at Mortagne in Perche, France (Orne). He emigrated from France to New France in 1635 at the age of 13 with his father, Gaspard Boucher, a carpenter, his mother Nicole Lemer, and at least six siblings. Gaspard had sold his farm in Mortagne in 1634 in answer to a call for emigrants to settle in New France from Robert Giffard. Gaspard was hired by the Jesuits to work at the Notre-Dame-des-Anges farm.

Pierre was the oldest surviving son of his parents. In 1637 at the age of 15, he entered the services of the Jesuits and spent four years with the Wendat (Huron) missions at Georgian Bay (see Sainte-Marie among the Hurons), until 1641. He fluently spoke the Iroquoian languages, of which Wendat is a member. On April 11, 1640, he was seriously injured during what is described as an uprising by the Wendat at Téanaostaiaé, called St Joseph II by the Jesuits, and near present day Springwater, Ontario where Jean de Brébeuf and Pierre-Joseph-Marie Chaumonot were also injured. He returned to Quebec.

== From Corporal to Governor ==
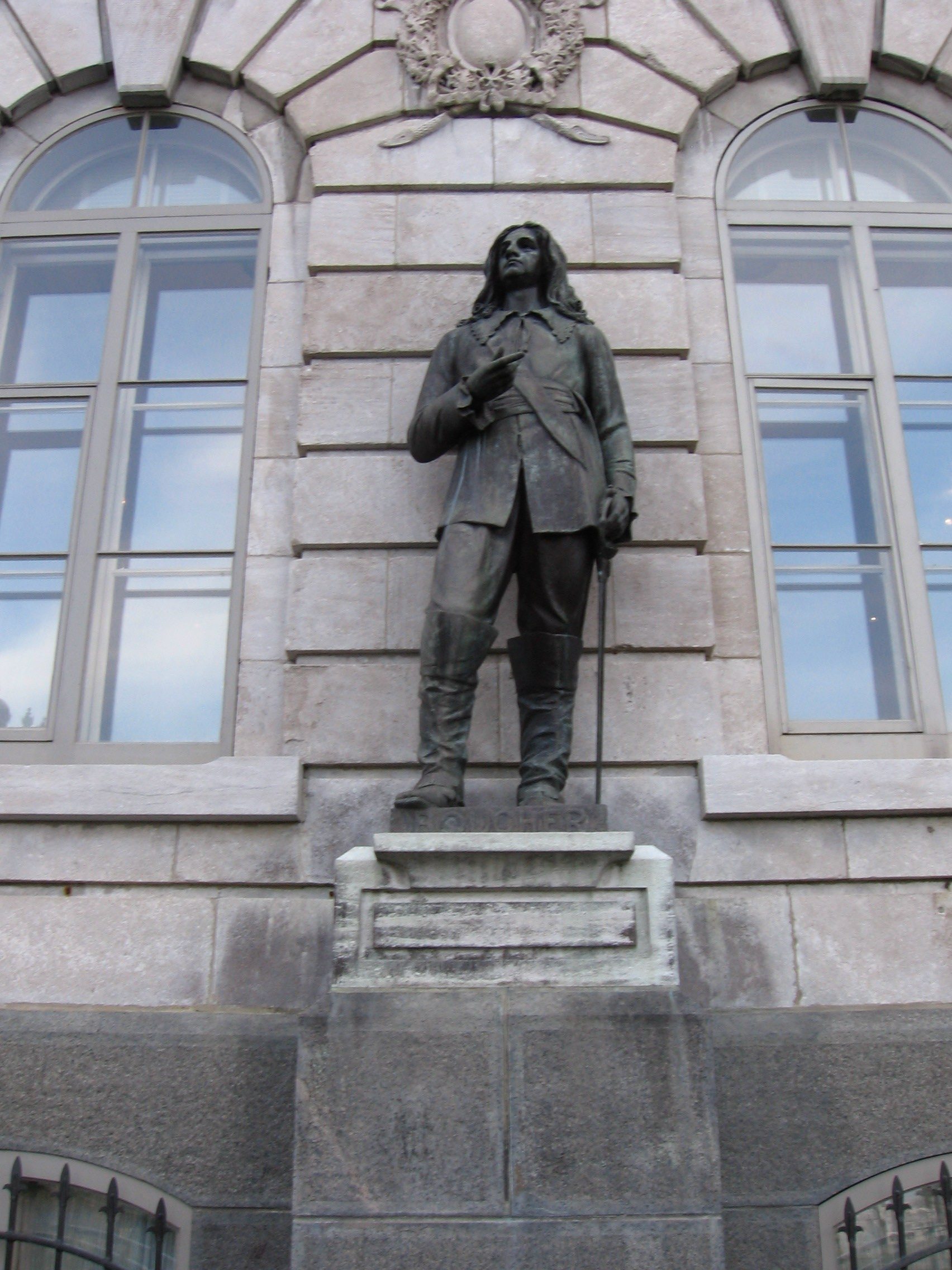
Alfred Laliberté's Pierre Boucher sculpture in front of Parliament Building (Quebec)

In 1641, Governor Charles Huault de Montmagny took him into his service as a soldier in the garrison of Quebec City, but especially as an interpreter and agent to the Indian tribes due to his familiarity with the Wendat language. In this capacity, he took part in all the parleys of the authorities with the Indians. In 1645, Boucher was appointed official interpreter of Indian languages at Trois-Rivières. He rose through the ranks first as corporal, sergeant, and then as commissioned officer. He was appointed commissary-general of the trading post in 1648 and elected captain of the militia in 1651. While in this capacity, he distinguished himself against an attack by the Haudenosaunee in 1653 and concluded a peace treaty with them on favourable terms. The next year, owing to this success, he was named governor of the settlement.

== Raised to nobility ==
Coat of arms of Pierre Boucher

In 1661, he was sent to France to represent the colonies. He returned with soldiers, supplies, additional settlers and a commitment of support to the colony of New France by the French king, Louis XIV. Pierre Boucher was the first Canadian settler to be ennobled by King Louis XIV.

== Re-appointed governor ==
Re-appointed governor in 1662, a position he held until his resignation in 1667. His L'histoire veritable et naturelle des moeurs et productions du pays de la Nouvelle-France, vulgairement dite le Canada, a description of the flora, fauna and native societies in the region (and a significant, pioneering documentation of North American natural history) was published in Paris in 1664. He was succeeded in the governorship by his son-in-law, René Gaultier de Varennes. He withdrew from public office to establish his Seigneurie centred on Boucherville on the south shore of the St Lawrence River near Montreal and extending out well into the Montérégie region. His lands also included parts of the North Shore extending out to la Mauricie and Trois-Rivières. He died at his seigneury at Boucherville, which was named in his honour.

== Family ==
Pierre Boucher married Marie-Madeleine Chrestienne (Ouebadinoukoué), a Wendat girl who had been educated by the Ursuline order of nuns; she died in childbirth. Their infant son Jacques did not survive. Pierre Boucher later married Jeanne Crevier, who bore 15 children; Their descendants took many names and thrived in the diaspora of New France, and many lines are still in existence today. The eldest son, Pierre Boucher inherited the title and seigneurie of Boucherville, which had excellent land in the alluvial floodplain of the St Lawrence River. He married his eldest daughter, Marie-Ursule Boucher, to René Gaultier de Varennes, governor of Trois Rivières, under whom he had served. It is not known whether Pierre Boucher received land as dowry, as an award of bravery, or during his tenure as governor of Trois Rivières, but later Pierre Boucher the eldest is cited as having a Northern Mauricie holding, having rockier soil, which he split into two fiefdoms for his next two sons: Lambert Boucher De Grandpré and Ignace Boucher De Grosbois. One of his descendants is Pope Leo XIV.

=== Name ===
While first surname of the family is Boucher; this name is gradually supplanted by the names of nobility, which become the new surnames of this diverse genealogical branche. Surnames in the Boucher line include Montarville, or de Montarville, Grandpré, DeGrandpré, or de Grandpré, Grosbois, DeGrosbois or de Grosbois, Des Rochés or DesRocher, Monbrun or de Monbrun, LaPerrière or de la Perrière, LaCoursière or de la Coursière, Montizambert or de Montizambert, Niverville or de Niverville, Bruyère or de la Bruyère, le Clerc, Lussier, Marcotte, Saucier, Gaultier de Varennes, LeGardeur de Tilly, Daneau de Muy, Sabrevois de SermonVille. Descendants have spread beyond Canada to places including the United States, Mauritius, France, Brazil, and the West Indies, and include such prominent French-Canadians and French-Americans as Paul André Albert and Jade Raymond, along with world figures like Pope Leo XIV.

=== Issue ===
1. Pierre Boucher de Boucherville, sieur de Boucherville, 1653-1740, second lord of Boucherville, first lord of Montarville. Spouse of Charlotte Denis.
2. Marie-Ursule Boucher, 1655-1733, spouse René Gaultier de Varennes.
3. Lambert Boucher, sieur de Grandpré, 1656-1699, spouse of Marguerite Vauvril de Blason.
4. Ignace Boucher, sieur de Grosbois, 1659-1699, spouse of Marie-Anne Margane de Lavaltrie.
5. Madeleine Boucher, 1661-1739, spouse of Pierre-Noël Le Gardeur de Tilly.
6. Marguerite Boucher, 1663-1698, spouse of Nicolas Daneau de Muy.
7. Philippe Boucher, 1665-1721, priest.
8. Jean Boucher, sieur de Monbrun 1667-1744, his first spouse Françoise-Claire Charest, then Michelle-Françoise Godefroy de Saint-Paul.
9. René Boucher, sieur de La Perrière, 1668-1742, spouse was Marie-Françoise Mailhot.
10. Jeanne Boucher, 1670-1703, twin, spouse de Jacques-Charles Sabrevois de Bleury.
11. Louise Boucher, 1670-1756, twin, single.
12. Nicolas-Michel Boucher, 1672-1733, priest
13. Jacques Boucher, sieur de Montizambert, 1673-1688, twin.
14. Jean-Baptiste Boucher, sieur de Niverville 1673-1740, twin, spouse Marguerite-Thérèse Hertel de la Frenière.
15. Geneviève Boucher, 1676-1766, Ursuline nun.

== Publications ==
- (Florentin Lambert, rue Saint Jacques, Paris, 1664) Pierre Boucher de Boucherville, Histoire veritable et naturelle des moeurs & productions du pays de la Nouuelle France, vulgairement dite le Canada
- (as above on Amazon books) Pierre Boucher de Boucherville, Histoire veritable et naturelle des moeurs & productions du pays de la Nouuelle France, vulgairement dite le Canada

== See also ==
- Musee Pierre Boucher at Séminaire Saint-Joseph de Trois-Rivières
- Frederick Montizambert
- Marie-Marguerite d'Youville - great-granddaughter
- Timothy Demonbreun - great-grandson
- Pope Leo XIV - seven times great-grandson
