= Guillaume Guillemot =

Guillaume Guillemot (d. August 19, 1652) was governor of Trois-Rivières from 1651 to 1652. He was also known as Du Plessis-Kerbodot and was sometimes confused with Du Plessis-Bochart, head clerk of the Compagnie des Cent-Associés.

Guillemot was seigneur of the Kerbodot fief in Brittany. In 1657, he married Étiennette Després; they had two children. He arrived in Quebec City on October 13, 1651. Aiming to establish peace with the Iroquois, he led an emergency squad or "flying column" out from Trois-Rivières to seek them out. This unit was ambushed and twenty-two of the French, including Guillemot, were killed or captured by the Iroquois.

His death on August 19th 1652 is also detailed in Jesuit Relations Volume XXXVII.

"2 French shallops having been in search of the cattle of 3 Rivers,—killed or scattered by the Iroquois, above 3 Rivers, along the lake, —the following persons were killed or carried away captive: Monsieur Du Plessis, the Governor.

Monsieur Grandmesnil.

Guillaume Isabelle.

francheville, captive.

Poisson.

Turcot.

Normanville, captive.

Du Puis.

Matris Belhomme, burned.

Langoulmois, killed.

La Palme, captive.

La Gravé.

St. Germain.

Chaillon.

Des Lauriers, died from his wounds.

The fight was about eleven o'clock in the morning. 120 Onneiochronnons"
