= François de Champflour =

François de Champflour (fl. 1639 - disappeared 1649) was a soldier and administrator in New France. He served as governor of Trois-Rivières from 1639 to 1645.

He was born in Auvergne, France. He was named governor in 1639 by Governor Montmagny. Champflour served as commandant for Fort Richelieu from August 1642 to December 1643. In the fall of 1645, he went to France to settle his affairs with the intention of returning, but in the end did not. In 1646, he was awarded the fief of Champflour at Trois-Rivières by the Compagnie des Cent-Associés. In 1649, he sold this fief to Jacques Poterie.

The rue Champflour in Trois-Rivières was named in his honour.
