= Marc-Antoine Bras-De-Fer de Chateaufort =

Marc-Antoine Bras-De-Fer de Chateaufort (died after September 1638) was a soldier and administrator in New France. He served as commandant of Trois-Rivières from 1636 to 1638. He also served as acting commandant of New France from December 1635 to June 1636.

He came to Quebec City in 1634 or 1635 and took charge of New France following the death of Champlain. Chateaufort passed control of the colony to Governor Montmagny on his arrival in June 1636. Soon afterwards, he travelled to Trois-Rivières to assume the role of commandant there.
