= François Desjordy Moreau de Cabanac =

French soldier (1666–1726)

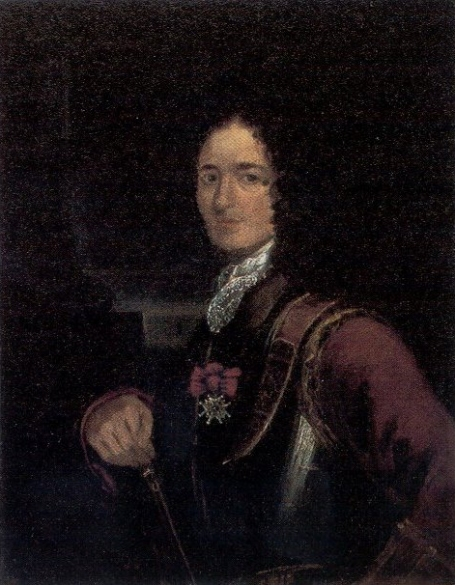
François Desjordy Portrait

François Desjordy Moreau de Cabanac (1666–1726) was a soldier, seigneur and administrator in New France. He served as commandant (military governor) of Trois-Rivières from 1725 to 1726. His name also appears as de Sourdy, de Jordy or Desjordis.

The son of Pierre-François de Jordy and Élisabeth de Pradines, he was born in Carcassonne in Languedoc, France. In 1682, he became a cadet in the Régiment de Besançon. In 1685, he was named a lieutenant in the colonial regular troops and travelled to New France. De Cabanac was stationed in Montreal until 1687 and took part in the defence of Quebec City against Major-general Sir William Phips in 1690. In 1696, he was named commandant for Fort Frontenac. In the same year, he received the seigneury of Des Aulnets.

He was married twice: first to Anne Nolan in 1696 and then, in 1705, to Louise-Catherine, the daughter of René Robinau de Bécancour, after the death of his first wife. He acquired the seigneury of Îles Bouchard through his second marriage. From 1711 to 1712, he was commandant at Fort Chambly. In 1718, de Cabanac was awarded the cross of Saint-Louis. In 1720, he was named town major of Trois-Rivières; his uncle Joseph Desjordy de Cabanac had held the same post from 1712 to 1713. He was named commandant of Trois-Rivières in 1725 under the name François Desjordy de Saint-Georges. De Cabanac died at Trois-Rivières early in 1726 and was buried there on February 16 the same year.

The rue De Cabanac in Trois-Rivières was named in his honour but was renamed to rue Saint-Joseph in 1961 and then to rue Fernand-Goneau in 1975.
