= Trois-Rivières =

- City
- Ville de Trois-Rivières
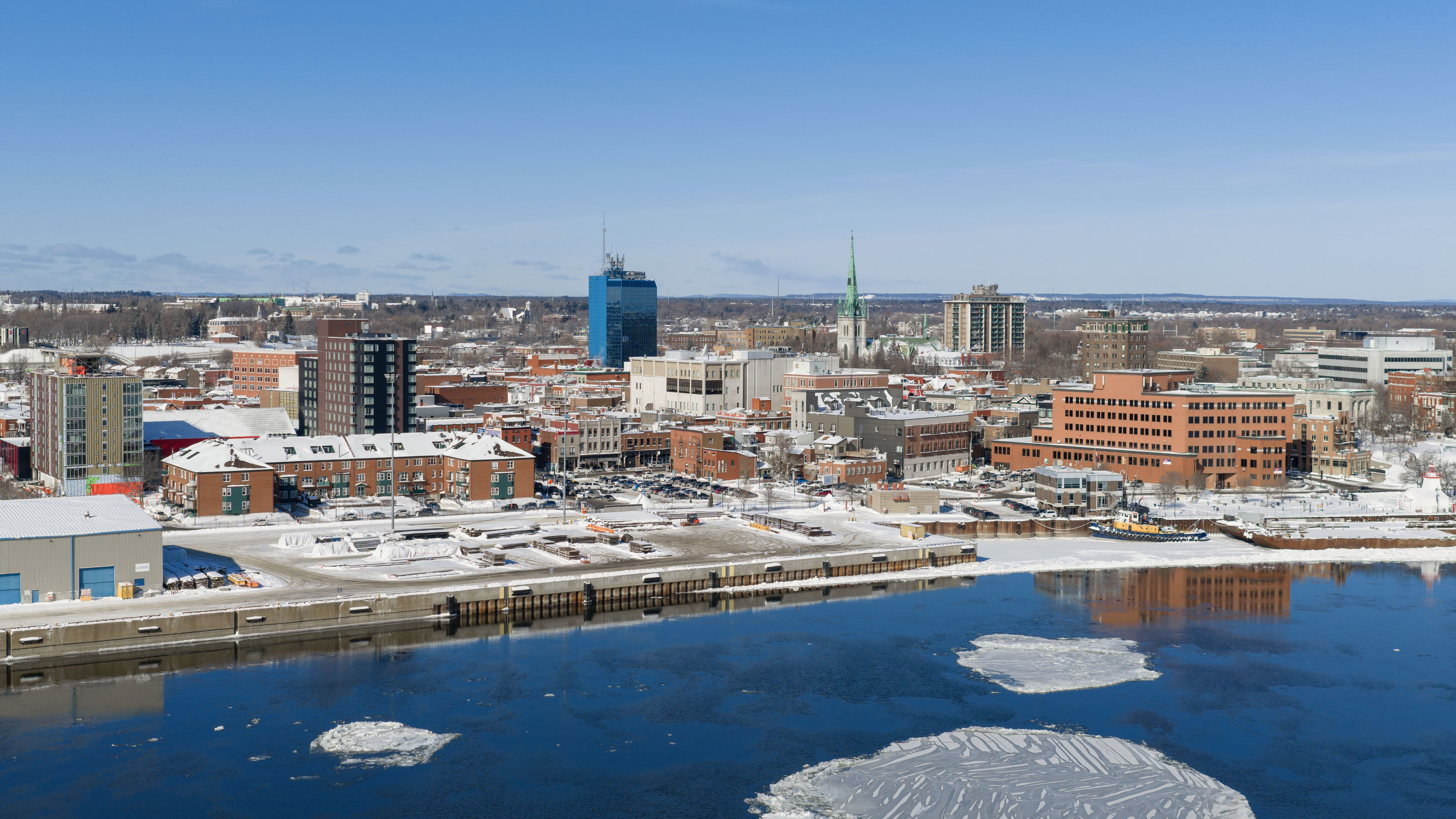
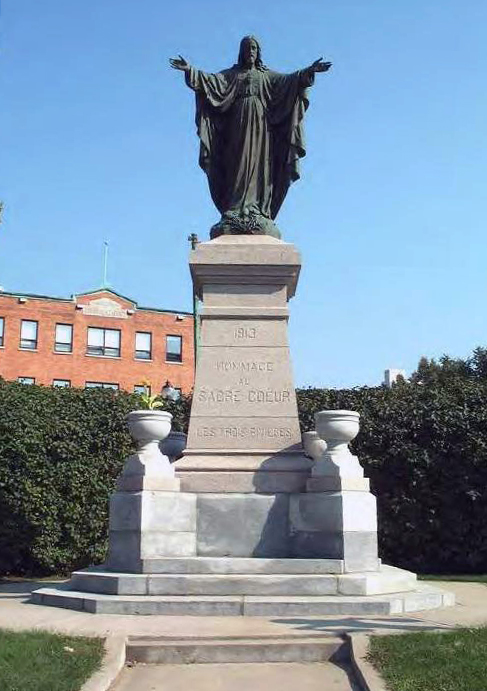
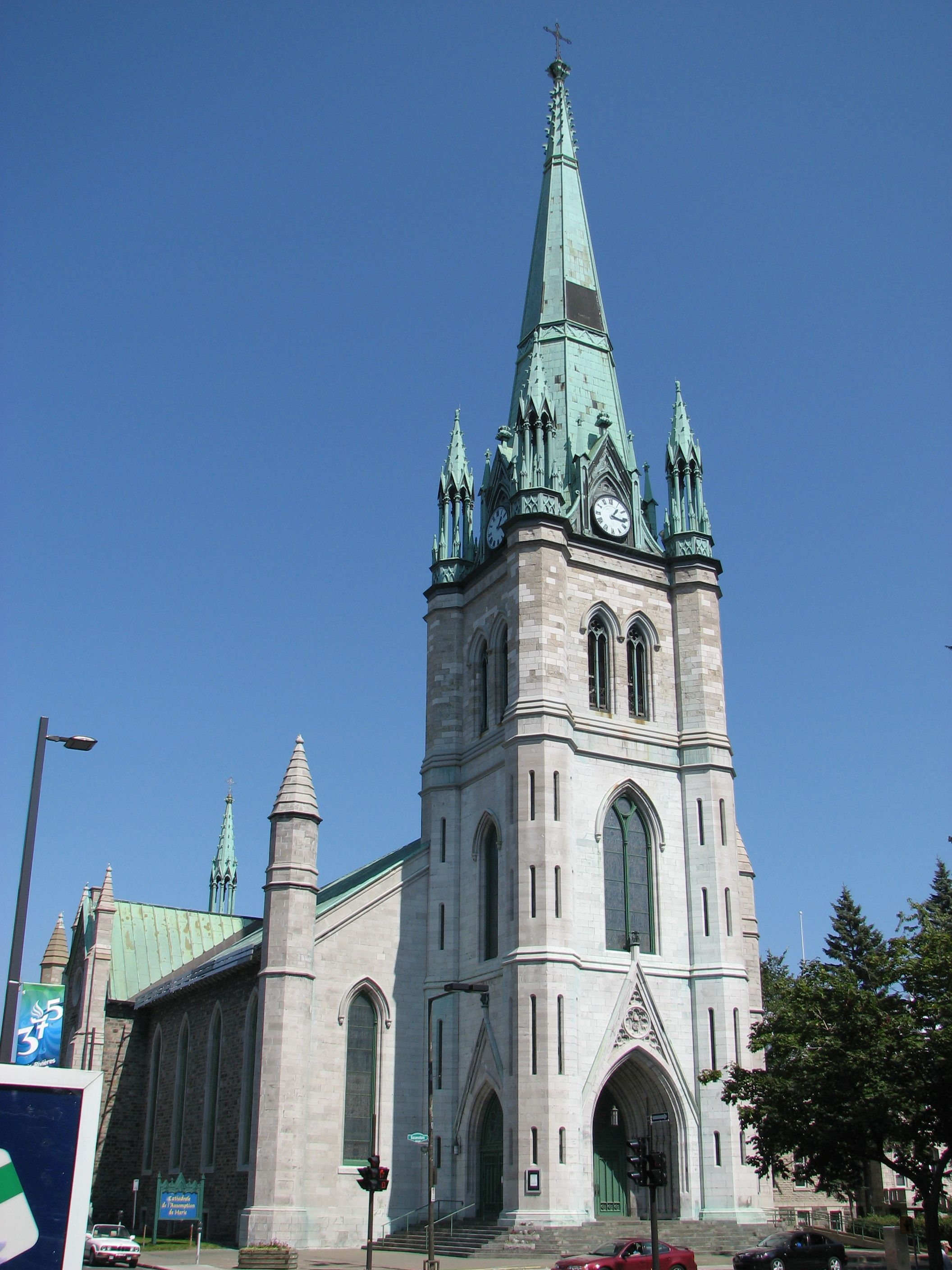
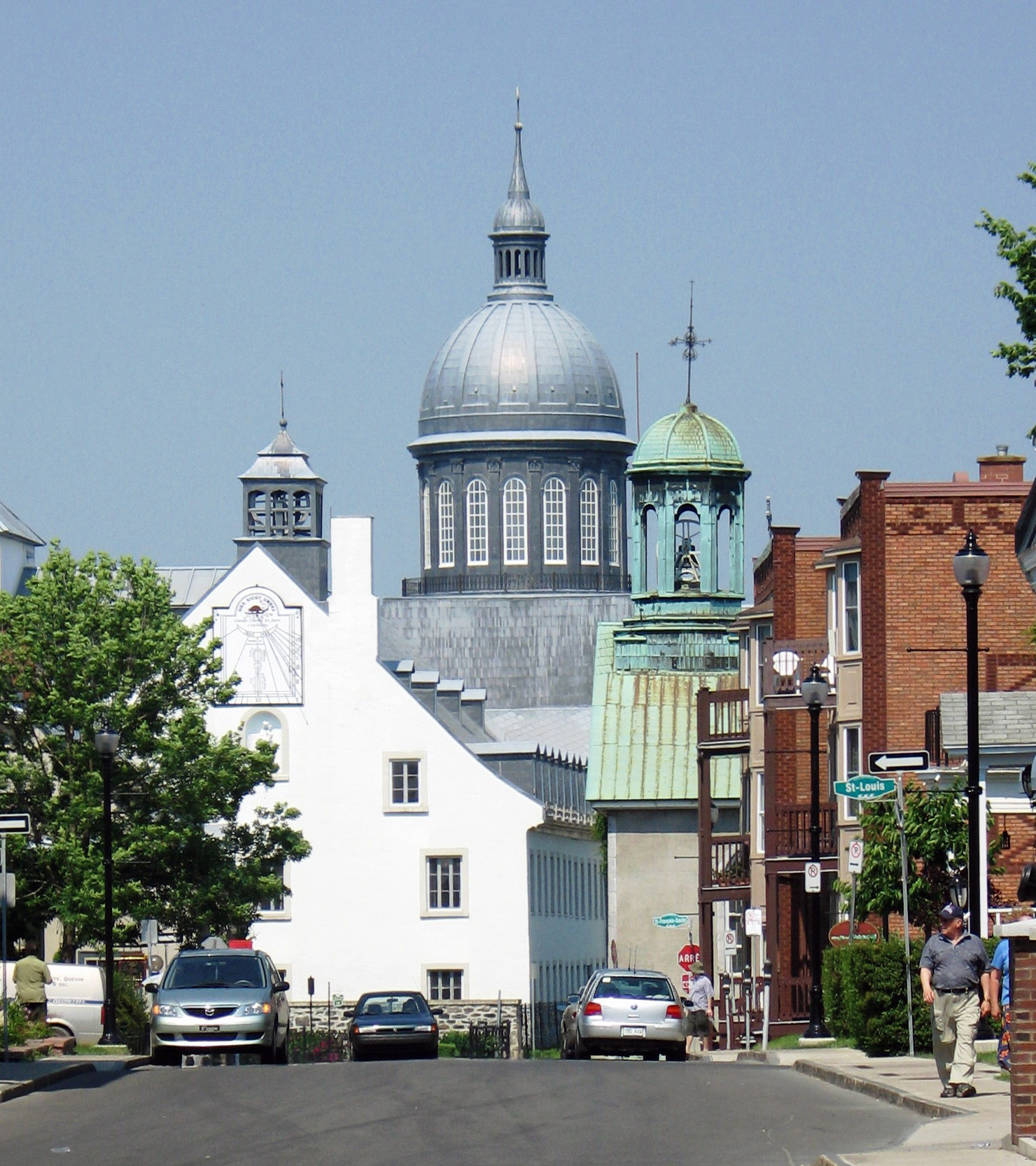
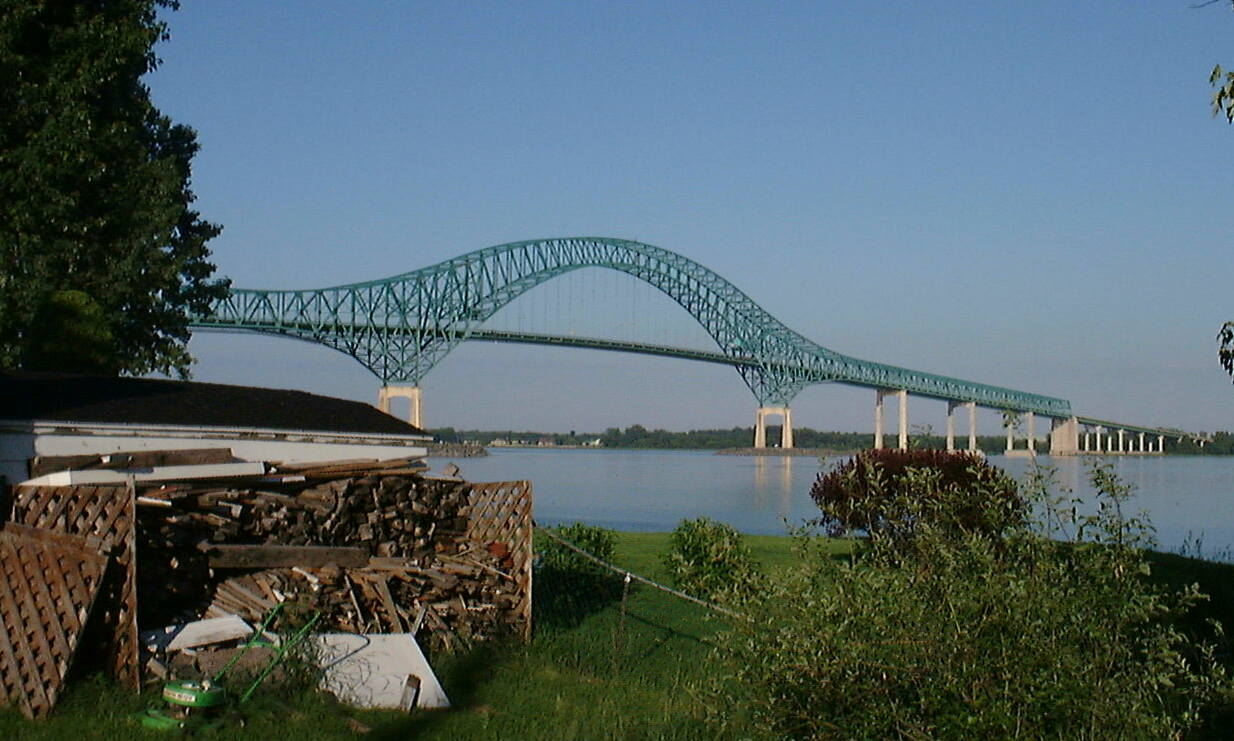
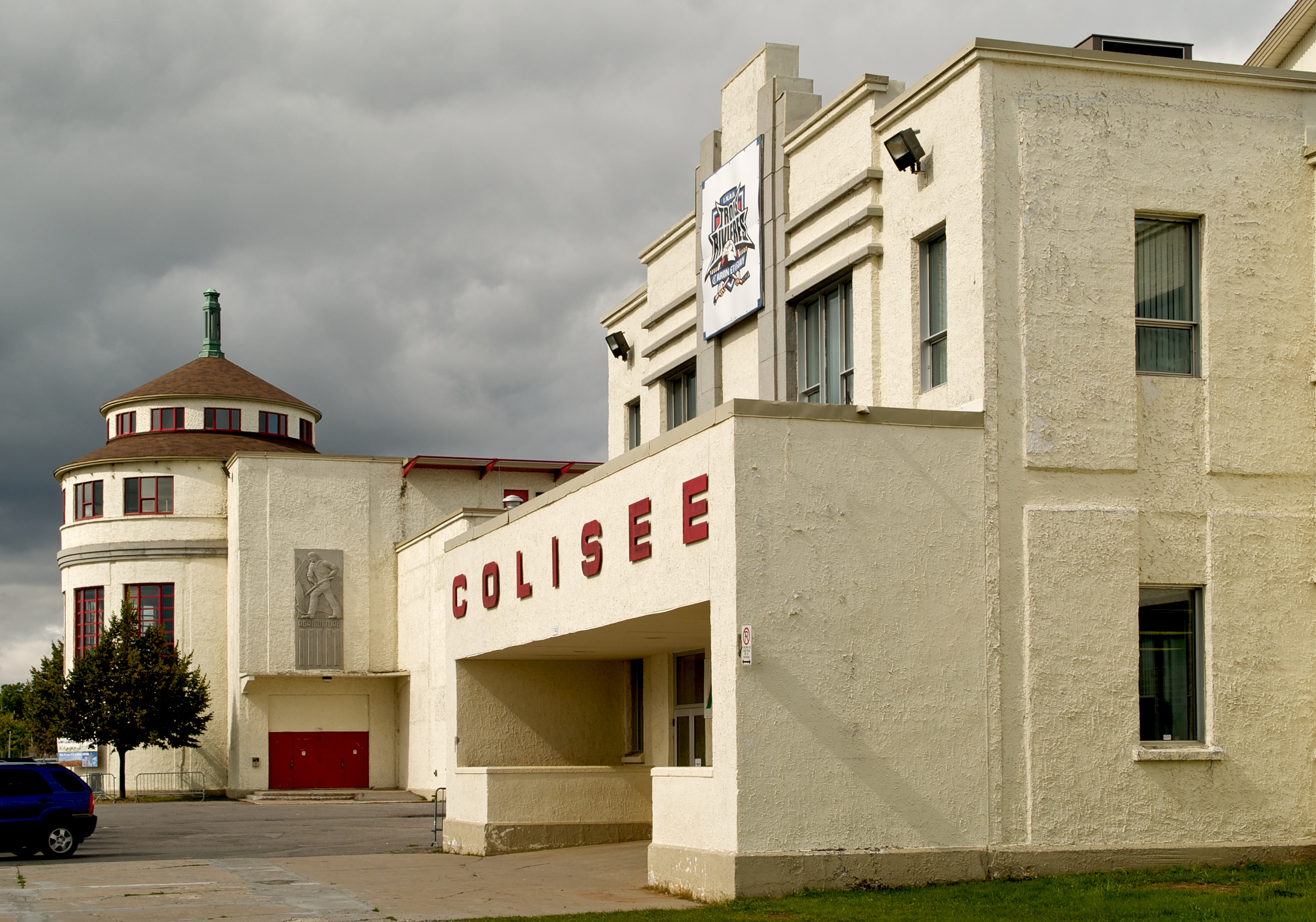
- Skyline Sacred Heart Monument Assumption Cathedral Ursulines Monastery Laviolette Bridge Colisée Jean-Guy Talbot

- Flag Coat of arms Logo
- Motto: Deus nobiscum quis contra ("If God is with us, who can be against us")
- Trois-Rivières metropolitan area

- Location of Trois-Rivières in the province of Quebec Trois-Rivières (Canada)
- Coordinates: 46°20′35″N 72°32′36″W
- Country: Canada
- Province: Quebec
- Region: Mauricie
- RCM: None
- Founded: July 4, 1634 by Laviolette
- Incorporated: June 10, 1857
- Constituted: January 1, 2002
- Boroughs: Cap-de-la-Madeleine, Trois-Rivières-Ouest, Saint-Louis-de-France, Pointe-du-Lac, Sainte-Marthe-du-Cap

Government
  - Type: Trois-Rivières City Council
  - Mayor: Jean-François Aubin
  - Federal riding: Berthier—Maskinongé and Trois-Rivières
  - Prov. riding: Champlain and Maskinongé and Trois-Rivières

Area (2021)
  - Land: 288.65 km^{2} (111.45 sq mi)
  - Urban: 98.58 km^{2} (38.06 sq mi)
  - Metro: 1,038.64 km^{2} (401.02 sq mi)
- Elevation: 61 m (200 ft)

Population (2025)
  - City: 144,472
  - Rank: 9th in Quebec
  - Density: 500.5/km^{2} (1,296/sq mi)
  - Urban: 128,057
  - Urban density: 1,299/km^{2} (3,360/sq mi)
  - Metro: 167,416 (Note: Includes Trois-Rivières, Bécancour, Champlain, Saint-Luc-de-Vincennes, Yamachiche, Saint-Maurice and Wôlinak.)
  - Metro density: 161.2/km^{2} (418/sq mi)
  - Pop 2021-2024: ▲3.7%
  - Dwellings: 70,411
- Demonym: Trifluvians
- Time zone: UTC−05:00 (EST)
  - Summer (DST): UTC−04:00 (EDT)
- Postal code(s): G8T to G8Z, G9A to G9C
- Area code: 819
- GDP (Trois-Rivières CMA): CA$6.3 billion (2016)
- GDP per capita (Trois-Rivières CMA): CA$40,290 (2016)
- Website: www.v3r.net

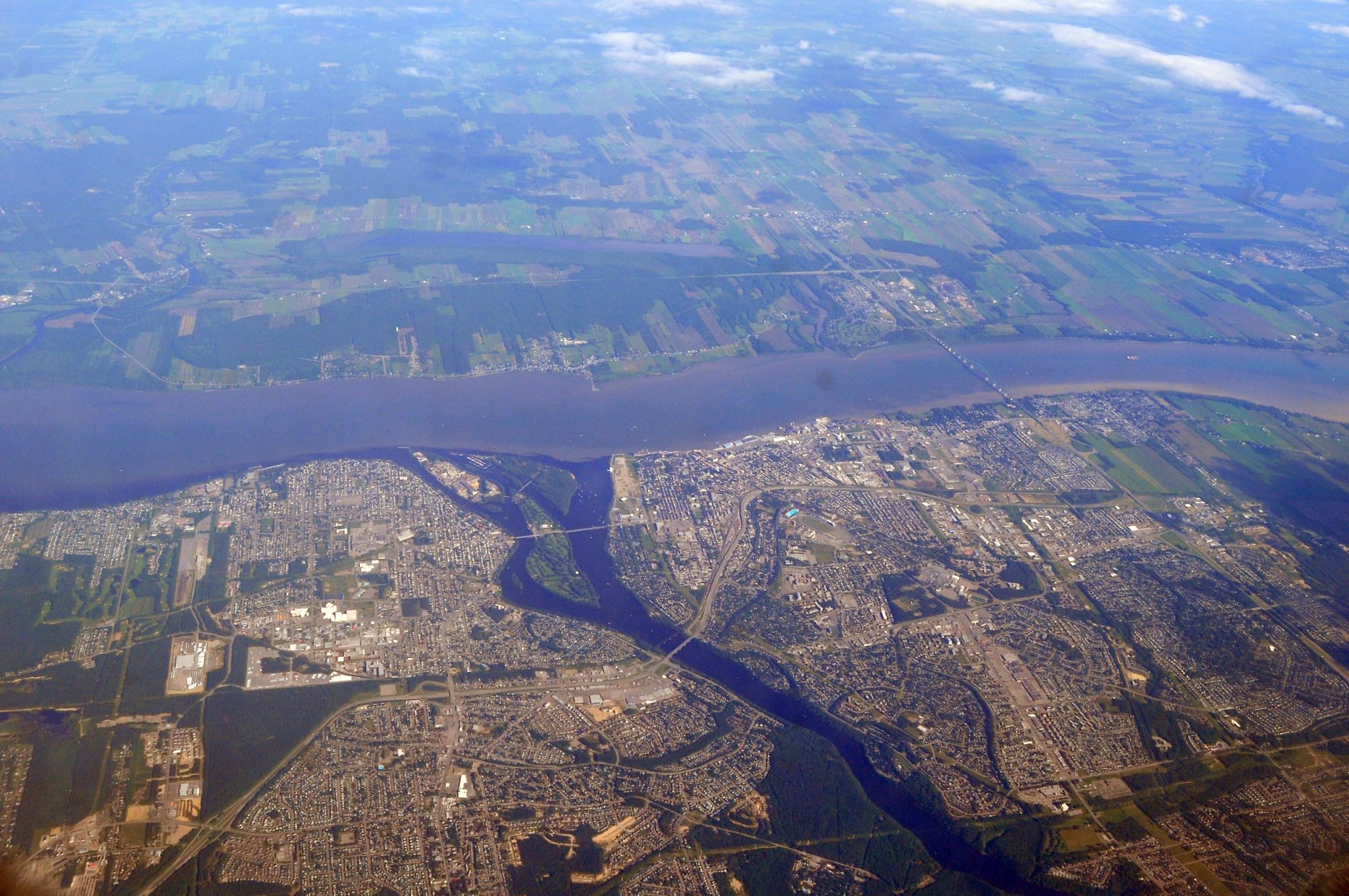
Trois-Rivières aerial view

Trois-Rivières (French: [tʁwɑ ʁivjɛʁ], Canadian French: [tʁwɔ ʁivjaɛ̯ʁ]; lit. 'Three Rivers') is a city in the Mauricie administrative region of Quebec, Canada. It is located at the confluence of the Saint-Maurice and Saint Lawrence rivers, on the north shore of the Saint Lawrence River across from the city of Bécancour. It is part of the densely populated Quebec City–Windsor Corridor and is approximately halfway between Montreal and Quebec City. Trois-Rivières is the economic and cultural hub of the Mauricie region. The settlement was founded by French colonists on July 4, 1634, as the second permanent settlement in New France, after Quebec City in 1608.

The name of Trois-Rivières, which dates from the end of the 16th century, was used by French explorers in reference to the three channels in the Saint-Maurice River formed at its mouth with the Saint Lawrence, as it is divided by two islands, Potherie (Île Caron) and Île Saint-Quentin. The city occupies a location near where Jacques Cartier, in a 1535 trip along the St. Lawrence, stopped to plant a cross on Saint-Quentin island.

Trois-Rivières is also the name of a territory equivalent to a regional county municipality (TE) of Quebec, coextensive with the city of Trois-Rivières. Its geographical code is 371. Together with the regional county municipality of Les Chenaux, it forms the census division (CD) of Francheville (37). The municipalities within Les Chenaux and the former municipalities that were amalgamated into Trois-Rivières formerly constituted the regional county municipality of Francheville. Trois-Rivières is the seat of the judicial district of the same name.

== City name ==
The city's name, which is French for 'three rivers', is named for the fact the Saint-Maurice River has three mouths at the Saint Lawrence River, as it is divided by two islands in the river. The Trois-Rivières name was used for the first time in 1599 by Sieur François Gravé Du Pont, a geographer under Champlain, whose records confirmed the name in 1603. As Sieur Gravé Du Pont sailed upriver toward Montreal, he saw what appeared to be three separate tributaries. He had yet to learn that two large islands divide the course of the Saint-Maurice River into three streams, where each flows into the St. Lawrence River.

Historically, in English this city was once known as Three Rivers. Since the late 20th century, when there has been more recognition of Quebec and French speakers, the city has generally been referred to as Trois-Rivières in both English and French. The anglicized name still appears in many areas of the town (e.g., the city's Three Rivers Academy), bearing witness to the influence of English settlers in the town. The city's inhabitants are known as Trifluviens (Trifluvians).

== History ==
For thousands of years, the area that would later become known as Trois-Rivières was frequented by indigenous peoples. The historic Algonquin and Abenaki peoples used it as a summer stopping place. They would fish and hunt here, as well as gather roots and nuts. The area was rich in resources. The French explorer Jacques Cartier described the site while on his second journey to the New World in 1535.

The name "Trois-Rivières", however, was not given until 1599, by Captain Dupont-Gravé, and first appeared on maps of the area dated 1601.

In 1603, while surveying the Saint-Lawrence River, Samuel de Champlain recommended establishing a permanent settlement in the area. The settlement grew into a village, officially formed on July 4, 1634, by its first governor, Sieur de Laviolette. Early inhabitants of Trois-Rivières included Quentin Moral, Sieur de St-Quentin; future governor Pierre Boucher de Grosbois, François Hertel de la Fresnière (father of Joseph-François Hertel de la Fresnière), François Marguerie, René Robineau, and Jean Sauvaget, and interpreter Jean Godefroy de Lintot, who married Marie, daughter of Michel Le Neuf.

Jacques Leneuf de La Poterie, who would become governor of Trois-Rivières, and acting governor of New France, and royal judge Michel Le Neuf du Hérisson, who would be acting governor of Trois-Rivières, brothers, arrived with their widowed mother, Jeanne Le Marchand, in 1636. The Le Neufs were accompanied by Jacques' wife, Marguerite, and her brothers, Pierre Legardeur de Repentigny and future governor Charles Legardeur de Tilly.

The city was the second to be founded in New France (after Quebec City, before Montreal). Given its strategic location, it played an important role in the colony and in the fur trade with First Nations peoples. The settlement became the seat of a regional Government of Trois-Rivières in 1665. Ursuline nuns first arrived at the settlement in 1697, where they founded the first school and helped local missionaries to Christianize the local indigenous people, developing a class of Métis people. In 1730, the first smiths opened on the Saint Maurice river.

French sovereignty in Trois-Rivières continued until 1760, when the city was captured as part of the British conquest of Canada during the Seven Years' War. Sixteen years later, on June 8, 1776, it was the theatre of the Battle of Trois-Rivières (part of the ill-fated invasion of the province of Quebec by les Bostonnais, Americans from the Boston area) during the American Revolutionary War who arrived with the goal of weakening the British settlement.

Trois-Rivières continued to grow in importance throughout this period and beyond. In 1792 it was designated as the seat of a judicial district. In 1852, the Roman Catholic church made this the see of the Diocese of Trois-Rivières.

In 1816, Captain A.G. Douglas, a former adjutant at the British military college at Great Marlow, recommended a military college for Catholic and Protestant boys be established at Trois-Rivières. He proposed it operate in a disused government house and he would be superintendent. Douglas' college was intended as a boarding school to educate the young sons of officers, amongst others, in Latin, English, French, history, geography, drawing and mathematics. This preceded the founding of the Royal Military College of Canada in 1876. In 1878 a railway began to serve the city directly (north side of the St Lawrence).

In 1908, the greater part of the city of Trois-Rivières was destroyed by a fire; most of the city's original buildings, many dating to the French colonial years, were destroyed. Among the surviving buildings were the Ursuline Monastery and the De Tonnancour Manor. As a result of the destruction, a major redesign and renovation of the city was undertaken, including the widening and renewal of many of the city's roads. Many new businesses and industries became established in the town, attracting additional residents.

During the mid-century, the city became heavily industrialized and lost jobs during the later restructuring. In the 1960s, Trois-Rivières undertook a large-scale project of economic diversification, including founding several cultural institutions and attractions. The Old City of Trois-Rivières was declared an "historic sector" in 1964. The Laviolette Bridge, linking Trois-Rivières to Bécancour and the south shore of the Saint-Lawrence River, was opened officially on December 20, 1967. In 1969, the city founded the Université du Québec à Trois-Rivières, known for its chiropractic school, its podiatric medical education, and its programs for primary and secondary school education.

Although historically an important centre of commerce, trade and population, Trois-Rivières has been superseded by the two major cities of Quebec: the metropolis of Montreal and the capital of Quebec City. It remains as one of the principal medium-sized cities of Quebec, along with Saguenay, Sherbrooke, and Gatineau.

== Geography ==
=== Islands ===
Saint-Quentin Island lies at the confluence of the Saint-Maurice River and St. Lawrence River, where the city of Trois-Rivières developed. With the islands Saint-Christophe and De La Poterie, it creates three channels at the mouth of the Saint-Maurice River, where it flows into St. Lawrence River. The island was named in honour of judge Quentin Moral, also said to be a fur trader and one of the first dealers on this island. It is now a centre of popular outdoor activities and relaxation at the heart of city. The patron saint of the island is Quentin de Rome.

It was first inhabited by an Algonquin tribe who cultivate corn in the lowlands of the river. On October 7, 1535, Jacques Cartier planted a cross on the island and proclaimed the sovereignty of France on this territory. A commemorative wrought iron cross was erected at the site associated with Cartier's claim. The natural environment of Saint-Quentin has remained virtually unchanged. For nearly a century, it was not developed or cultivated.

Since 1930, the island has become more important as a destination for recreation. The island belonged at the time to Quebec Savings and Trust Company Limited and the Canada Power and Paper Corporation. The city bid for the land in 1933, but did not take ownership until November 3, 1947. During World War II, it was the site of a training camp for the Royal Canadian Navy. Services were gradually introduced in 1950.

The park and the beach on the island Saint-Quentin were officially inaugurated on June 24, 1962, in the presence of 5,000 people. There were more than 100 000 visitors that year. Since then, many facilities have been developed on the island, including a marina, a bike path, an interpretative trail, an ice rink, and camping ground. Several happenings and festivals are held annually on the island.

=== Climate ===
The area has a humid continental climate (Köppen Dfb). Winters are long, cold, and snowy: the January high is −5.6 °C (21.9 °F), with lows dropping to −20 °C (−4 °F) on 27 nights per year and to −30 °C (−22 °F) on 2.9 nights. Snowfall averages 274.4 cm (108.0 in), with reliable snow cover from December to March. Summers are warm, with an average July high of 25.1 °C (77.2 °F), and high temperatures reach 30 °C (86 °F) on 5.5 days per summer. Spring and autumn are short and crisp. Precipitation averages 1,001.7 mm (39.44 in), and is the greatest during summer.

The highest temperature ever recorded in Trois-Rivières was 37.8 °C (100.0 °F) on 17 July 1953. The coldest temperature ever recorded was −41.7 °C (−43.1 °F) on 5 February 1923.

Climate data for Trois-Rivières WMO ID: 71724; coordinates 46°21′13″N 72°30′58″W; elevation: 6 m (20 ft); 1991−2020 normals, extremes 1920−present (Note: Climate data was recorded at Cap-de-la-Madeleine from December 1920 to April 1932 and at Trois-Rivières from November 1934 to present.)
Month	Jan	Feb	Mar	Apr	May	Jun	Jul	Aug	Sep	Oct	Nov	Dec	Year
Record high humidex	11.7	8.7	15.6	26.8	35.6	41.2	44.7	43.3	37.7	30.1	21.3	12.7	44.7
Record high °C (°F)	12.0 (53.6)	9.3 (48.7)	16.1 (61.0)	25.4 (77.7)	31.5 (88.7)	34.0 (93.2)	37.8 (100.0)	32.3 (90.1)	30.8 (87.4)	24.8 (76.6)	18.9 (66.0)	12.8 (55.0)	37.8 (100.0)
Mean daily maximum °C (°F)	−5.6 (21.9)	−3.9 (25.0)	1.2 (34.2)	8.8 (47.8)	17.3 (63.1)	22.5 (72.5)	25.1 (77.2)	24.1 (75.4)	19.8 (67.6)	12.2 (54.0)	4.9 (40.8)	−2.0 (28.4)	10.4 (50.7)
Daily mean °C (°F)	−9.9 (14.2)	−8.5 (16.7)	−3.1 (26.4)	4.6 (40.3)	12.6 (54.7)	18.1 (64.6)	20.9 (69.6)	19.9 (67.8)	15.5 (59.9)	8.5 (47.3)	1.8 (35.2)	−5.3 (22.5)	6.2 (43.2)
Mean daily minimum °C (°F)	−14.1 (6.6)	−13.1 (8.4)	−7.3 (18.9)	0.3 (32.5)	7.9 (46.2)	13.6 (56.5)	16.7 (62.1)	15.6 (60.1)	11.0 (51.8)	5.1 (41.2)	−1.3 (29.7)	−8.6 (16.5)	2.1 (35.8)
Record low °C (°F)	−32.3 (−26.1)	−41.7 (−43.1)	−26.4 (−15.5)	−15.6 (3.9)	−1.3 (29.7)	3.8 (38.8)	9.0 (48.2)	6.7 (44.1)	0.9 (33.6)	−4.9 (23.2)	−18.3 (−0.9)	−30.6 (−23.1)	−41.7 (−43.1)
Record low wind chill	−42.3	−39.6	−38.6	−25.9	−5.9	0.0	0.0	0.0	0.0	−10.4	−25.0	−35.5	−42.3
Average precipitation mm (inches)	83.1 (3.27)	65.9 (2.59)	76.3 (3.00)	87.3 (3.44)	83.4 (3.28)	104.5 (4.11)	124.5 (4.90)	95.7 (3.77)	96.9 (3.81)	100.5 (3.96)	88.0 (3.46)	94.7 (3.73)	1,100.7 (43.33)
Average rainfall mm (inches)	30.3 (1.19)	16.1 (0.63)	29.4 (1.16)	69.7 (2.74)	89.3 (3.52)	104.8 (4.13)	133.1 (5.24)	103.1 (4.06)	96.5 (3.80)	99.2 (3.91)	68.2 (2.69)	32.8 (1.29)	872.5 (34.35)
Average snowfall cm (inches)	60.8 (23.9)	53.0 (20.9)	50.0 (19.7)	14.1 (5.6)	0.1 (0.0)	0.0 (0.0)	0.0 (0.0)	0.0 (0.0)	0.0 (0.0)	3.5 (1.4)	24.4 (9.6)	68.6 (27.0)	274.4 (108.0)
Average precipitation days (≥ 0.2 mm)	13.8	11.3	11.6	11.6	13.2	13.3	15.5	11.5	11.7	14.2	13.5	14.8	156
Average rainy days (≥ 0.2 mm)	3.4	2.3	5.4	10.4	14.1	14.2	16.3	12.8	12.4	14.6	10.1	4.1	120.1
Average snowy days (≥ 0.2 cm)	12.9	10.2	7.5	2.8	0.06	0.0	0.0	0.0	0.0	0.63	5.8	11.7	51.6
Average relative humidity (%) (at 1500 LST)	73.7	68.8	63.8	59.2	57.4	62.6	64.4	63.2	64.0	65.6	70.4	75.9	65.8
Mean monthly sunshine hours	84.5	110.4	157.3	166.9	208.7	220.9	257.9	205.3	158.2	121.3	69.3	62.2	1,823.1
Percentage possible sunshine	30.1	37.9	42.7	41.1	45.0	46.9	54.1	46.8	41.9	35.8	24.4	23.1	39.1
Source: Environment and Climate Change Canada (July maximum) (February minimum) Sunshine data recorded at Nicolet

== Demographics ==
Trois-Rivières
Year	Pop.	±%
1665	455	—
1667	213	−53.2%
1681	150	−29.6%
1685	227	+51.3%
1688	216	−4.8%
1692	343	+58.8%
1695	349	+1.7%
1698	358	+2.6%
1706	203	−43.3%
1739	378	+86.2%
1754	808	+113.8%
1765	644	−20.3%
1790	1,213	+88.4%
1825	2,908	+139.7%
1861	6,058	+108.3%
1871	7,570	+25.0%
1881	8,670	+14.5%
1891	8,334	−3.9%
1901	9,981	+19.8%
1911	13,691	+37.2%
1921	22,367	+63.4%
1931	35,450	+58.5%
1941	42,007	+18.5%
1951	46,074	+9.7%
1956	50,483	+9.6%
1961	53,477	+5.9%
1966	57,540	+7.6%
1971	55,869	−2.9%
1976	52,518	−6.0%
1981	50,466	−3.9%
1986	50,122	−0.7%
1991	49,426	−1.4%
1996	48,419	−2.0%
2001	46,264	−4.5%
2006	126,323	+173.0%
2011	131,338	+4.0%
2016	134,413	+2.3%
2021	139,163	+3.5%
From Statistics Canada, The important increase between 2001 and 2006 was caused by the 2002 municipal reorganization

According to the 2021 Canadian census, Trois-Rivières had a population of 139,163 an increase of 3.5% from its 2016 population of 134,413. This population lived in 66,822 of its 70,411 total private dwellings. With a land area of 288.65 km^{2} (111.45 sq mi), the city had a population density of 482.1/km^{2} (1,248.7/sq mi) in 2021.

The Trois-Rivières metropolitan area as defined by Statistics Canada comprises Trois-Rivières itself and six other municipalities. Saint-Maurice, Yamachiche, Champlain and Saint-Luc-de-Vincennes are all located on the North shore and except for Saint-Luc (which is separated from it by Saint-Maurice) are also directly adjacent to Trois-Rivières. The city of Bécancour and the enclaved Indian reservation of Wôlinak are located opposite Trois-Rivières on the South shore of the Saint Lawrence River. In 2021 the population of the census metropolitan area was 161,489 in a land area of 1,038.64 km^{2} (401.02 sq mi) giving a population density of 155.5/km^{2} (402.7/sq mi)

In 2021 the population centre had 128,057 people in an area of 98.58 km^{2} (38.06 sq mi) giving a population density of 1,299.0/km^{2} (3,364.4/sq mi)

Prior to amalgamation on January 1, 2002, the new city of Trois-Rivières was divided among six municipalities.

Municipal population, pre-amalgamation (December 14, 2000)
Municipality	Population
Trois-Rivières	48,285
Cap-de-la-Madeleine	32,927
Trois-Rivières-Ouest	24,170
Saint-Louis-de-France	7,798
Pointe-du-Lac	6,846
Sainte-Marthe-du-Cap	6,428
Total	126,454

In 2021, the median age in Trois-Rivières was 47.2 years, compared to the Canadian average of 41.6. Slightly more than a quarter (26.3%) of the population was of retirement age (65 and older) compared to 19% in Canada as a whole.

=== Language ===
French was the sole mother tongue of 93.9% of residents of Trois-Rivières. The next most common first languages cited were English (1.2%), Spanish (1.1%), and Arabic (0.8%). 0.7% claimed both English and French as a first language, while 0.5% claimed both French and a non-official language.

=== Religion ===
In 2021, 71.0% of Trois-Rivières residents were Christian, down from 89.9% in 2011. 64.6% of residents were Catholic, 4.4% were Christians of unspecified denomination, and 0.7% were Protestants. All other Christian denominations and Christian-related traditions accounted for 1.3% of the population. 26.8% of residents were nonreligious or secular, up from 9.1% in 2011. All other religions and spiritual traditions account for 2.1% of the population. The largest non-Christian religion was Islam (1.6%).

=== Ethnicity ===
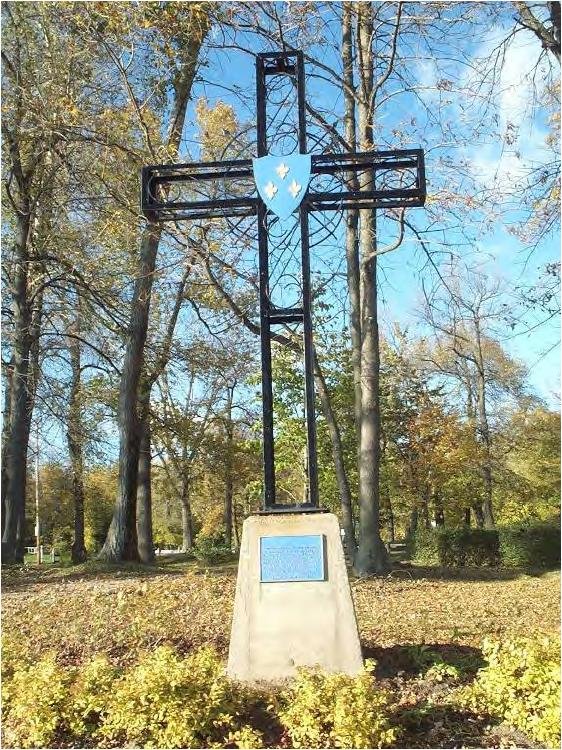
Jacques Cartier Cross on Saint-Quentin Island

According to the 2021 census, Approximately 92.1% of residents were White, 1.9% were Indigenous and 6.0% were visible minorities. The largest visible minority groups in Trois-Rivières were Black (2.8%), Latin American (1.2%), and Arab (1.0%).

Panethnic groups in the City of Trois-Rivières (2001−2021)
Panethnic group	2021		2016		2011		2006		2001	
Panethnic group	Pop.	%	Pop.	%	Pop.	%	Pop.	%	Pop.	%
European (Note: Statistic includes all persons that did not make up part of a visible minority or an indigenous identity.)	123,100	92.09%	122,690	95.1%	122,315	96.33%	120,365	97.42%	43,990	97.63%
Black	3,735	2.79%	1,810	1.4%	1,175	0.93%	610	0.49%	295	0.65%
Indigenous	2,555	1.91%	1,780	1.38%	1,430	1.13%	1,035	0.84%	375	0.83%
Latin American	1,610	1.2%	1,090	0.84%	820	0.65%	500	0.4%	80	0.18%
Middle Eastern (Note: Statistic includes total responses of "West Asian" and "Arab" under visible minority section on census.)	1,395	1.04%	810	0.63%	630	0.5%	505	0.41%	90	0.2%
East Asian (Note: Statistic includes total responses of "Chinese", "Korean", and "Japanese" under visible minority section on census.)	500	0.37%	330	0.26%	300	0.24%	215	0.17%	25	0.06%
Southeast Asian (Note: Statistic includes total responses of "Filipino" and "Southeast Asian" under visible minority section on census.)	400	0.3%	245	0.19%	180	0.14%	225	0.18%	200	0.44%
South Asian	205	0.15%	150	0.12%	40	0.03%	45	0.04%	0	0%
Other (Note: Statistic includes total responses of "Visible minority, n.i.e." and "Multiple visible minorities" under visible minority section on census.)	185	0.14%	90	0.07%	70	0.06%	50	0.04%	10	0.02%
Total responses	133,675	96.06%	129,010	95.98%	126,975	96.68%	123,555	97.81%	45,060	97.4%
Total population	139,163	100%	134,413	100%	131,338	100%	126,323	100%	46,264	100%

- Note: Totals greater than 100% due to multiple origin responses.

== Economy ==
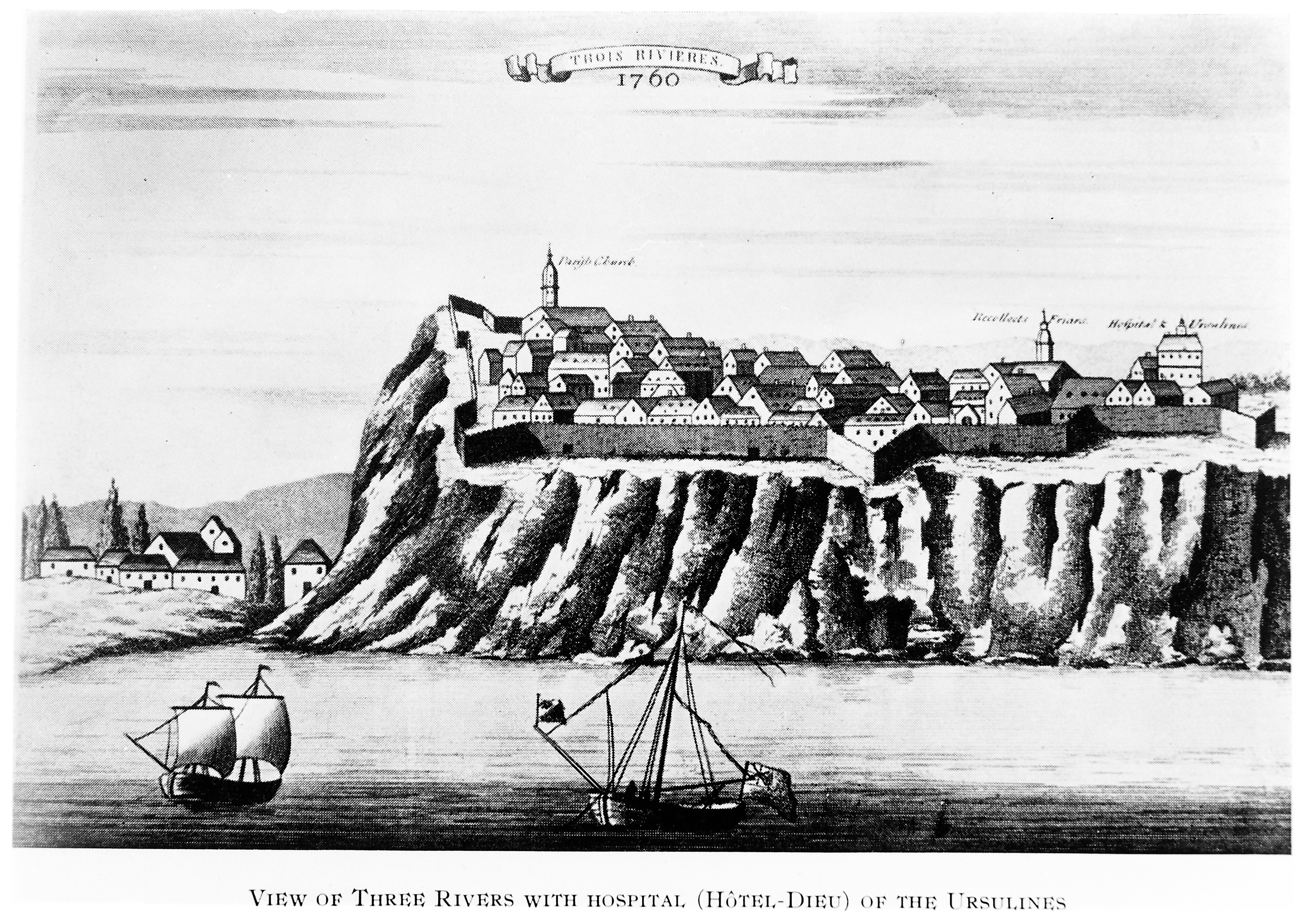
Trois-Rivières, 1760

Trois-Rivières is Canada's oldest industrial city, with its first foundry established in 1738. The forge produced iron and cast for 150 years, much of it being shipped to France to be used in French navy ships. The first port facility was built in 1818 near rue Saint-Antoine, and today handles 2.5 million tonnes of cargo annually. The first railway was built in 1879 to support the growing lumber industry.

From the late 1920s until the early 1960s, the city was known as the pulp and paper industry capital of the world. The city once had five mills in operation (Trois-Rivières Ouest, Wayagamack, C.I.P., Domtar and St-Maurice Paper). Today, there are three mills left operating (Kruger Trois-Rivières Ouest, Kruger Wayagamack and Cascades Lupel ex-St-Maurice Paper); the closures resulted largely to a decline in newsprint demand and globalization. The closures were not limited to just the pulp and paper industry. Trois-Rivières had an industrial decline in the 1980s and 1990s, when several textile mills were closed after owners moved jobs offshore. Unemployment rose to 14 percent in the 1990s.

Trois-Rivières is attempting an industrial revitalization by establishing technology parks and taking advantage of its central location to both Montreal and Quebec City, its university and port. An example of the new economy is Marmen Incorporated, which manufactures wind turbine towers and employs 1,000 people between its operations in Trois-Rivières and Matane.

The city's other prominent industries include metal transformation, electronics, thermoplastics, and cabinet making. An industrial park adjoining Trois-Rivières Airport serves also as a major centre for the aeronautical industry. Also, the production of food crops is still important to the economy.

== Arts and culture ==
Trois-Rivières hosts the FestiVoix de Trois-Rivières, a 10-day summer music festival that attracts in excess of 300,000 visitors annually. The city also hosts the Festival International de la Poésie – an international poetry festival – as well as the Festival International Danse Encore, and the MetalFest de Trois-Rivières every November. In 2009, Trois-Rivières was designated as the 2009 Cultural Capital of Canada for cities having a population of 125,000 or more.

Trois-Rivières is officially the "Poetry Capital of Quebec". Numerous plaques displaying poetic verses are installed throughout the centre of the city. An International Festival of Poetry is held annually in the first week of October.

== Attractions ==
=== Cityscape ===
The city's main thoroughfare is Boulevard des Forges, an area several blocks long in the heart of the Old Town composed of century-old buildings housing a great variety of cafés, restaurants, clubs, bars, and shops. In the warmer months, the area is regularly closed to vehicular traffic to accommodate various festivals and events, turning the downtown core into a pedestrian mall.

Notable landmarks include the Forges du Saint-Maurice, a foundry dating back to the 1730s, the Ursulines Monastery, and Notre-Dame-du-Cap Basilica.

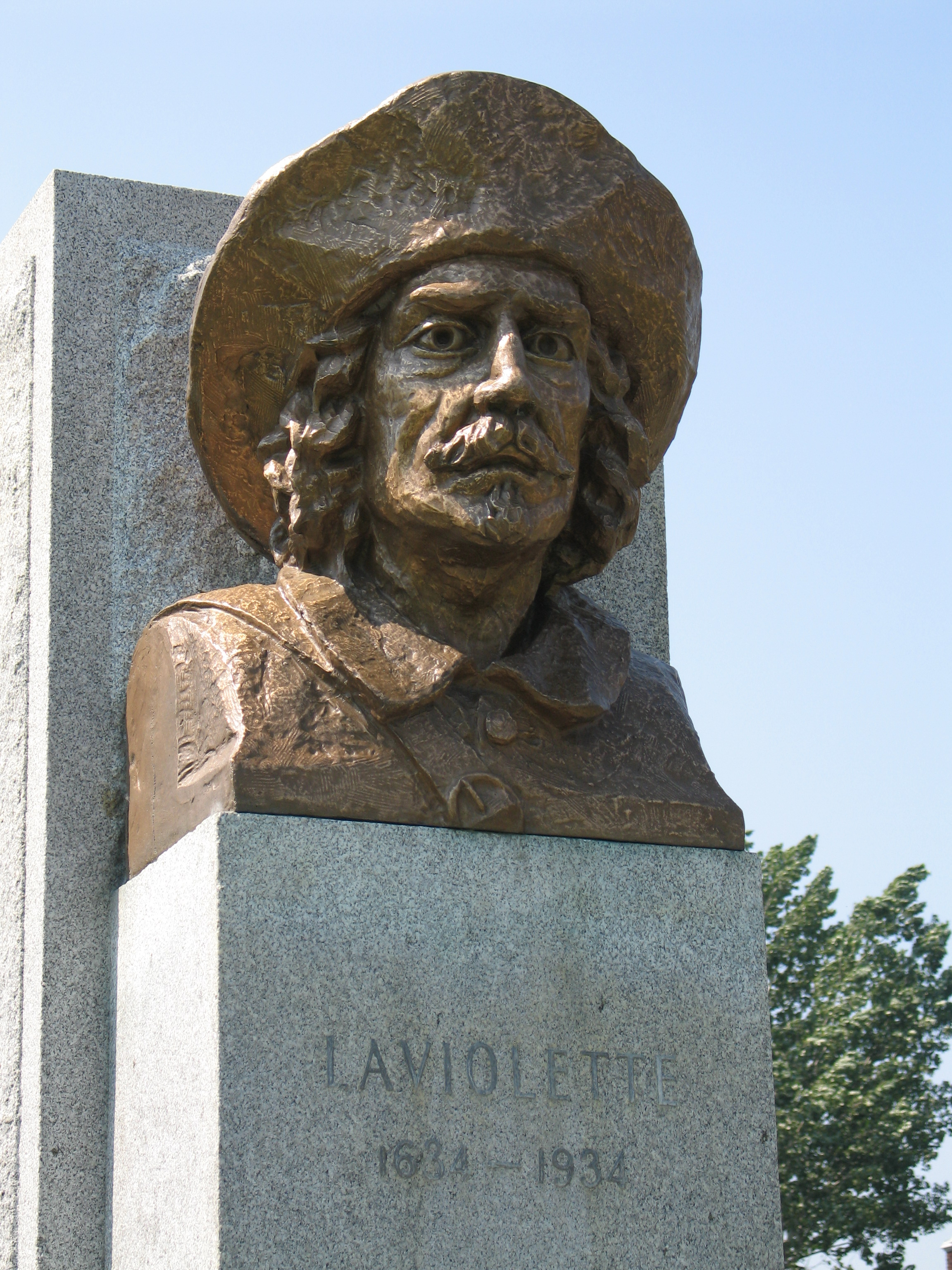
The Sieur de Laviolette, founder of Trois-Rivières. The Laviolette Bridge is his namesake.

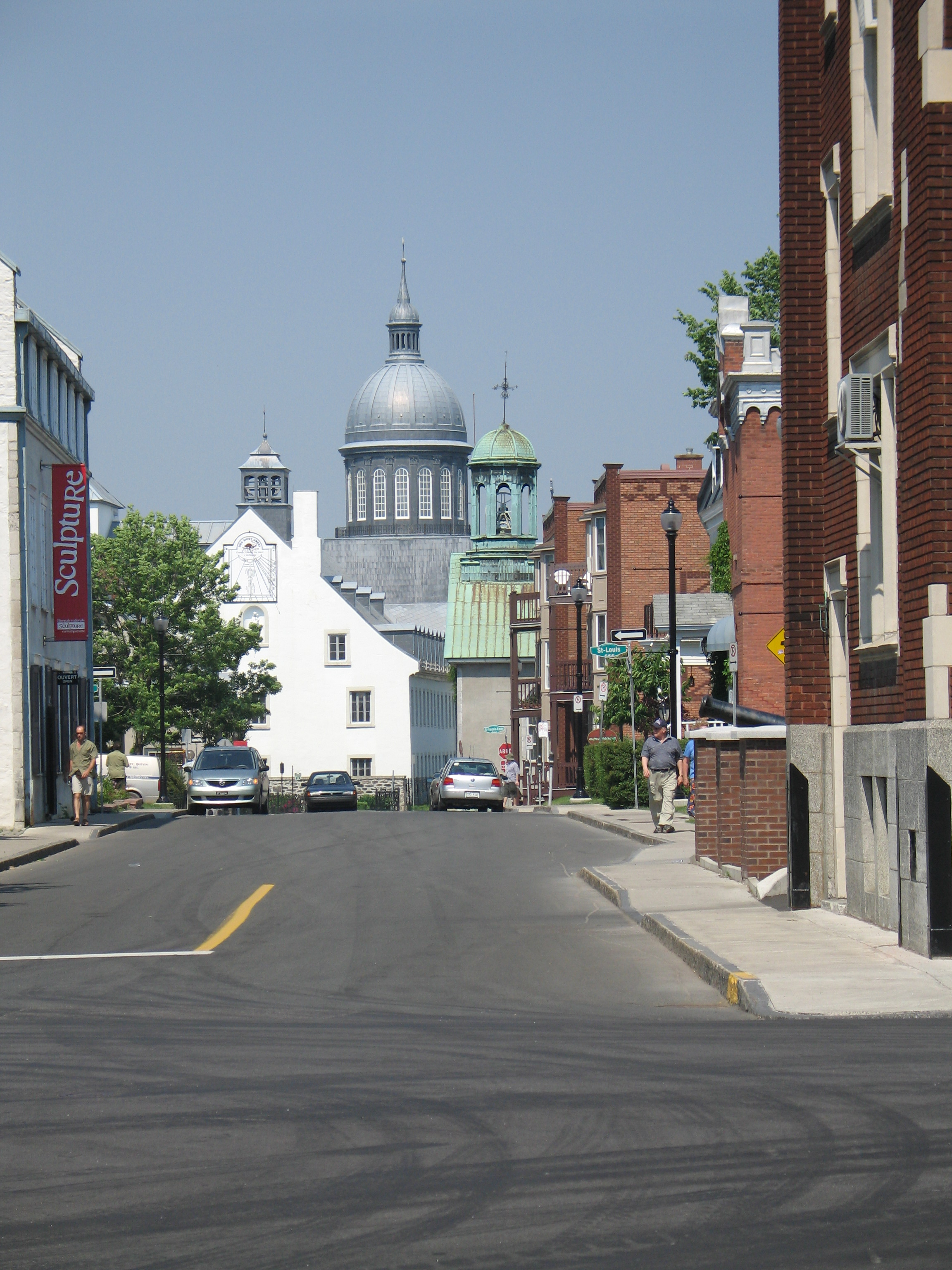
Architecture in old Trois-Rivières.

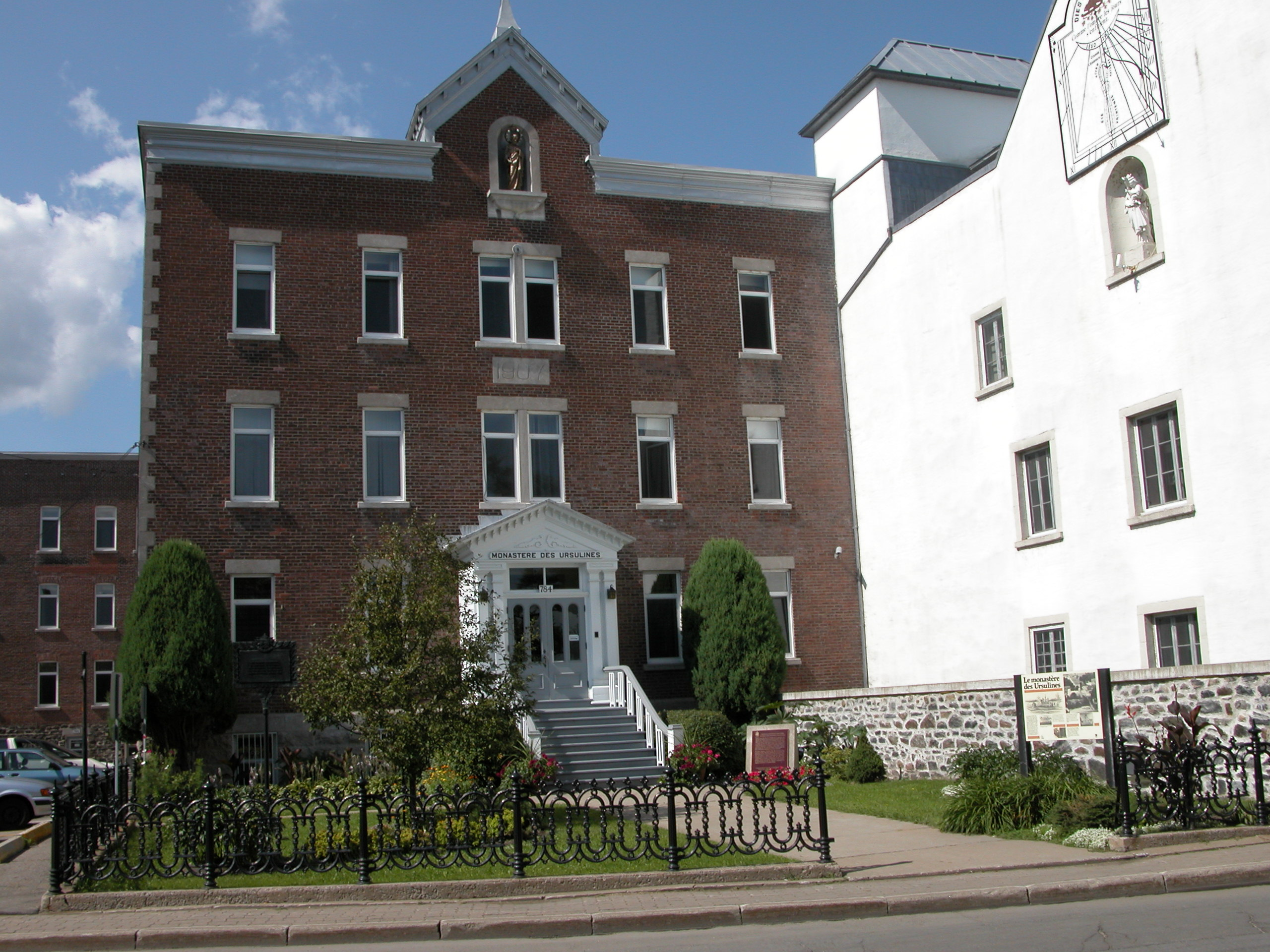
The front of the Ursulines Monastery, on rue des Ursulines.

== Sports ==
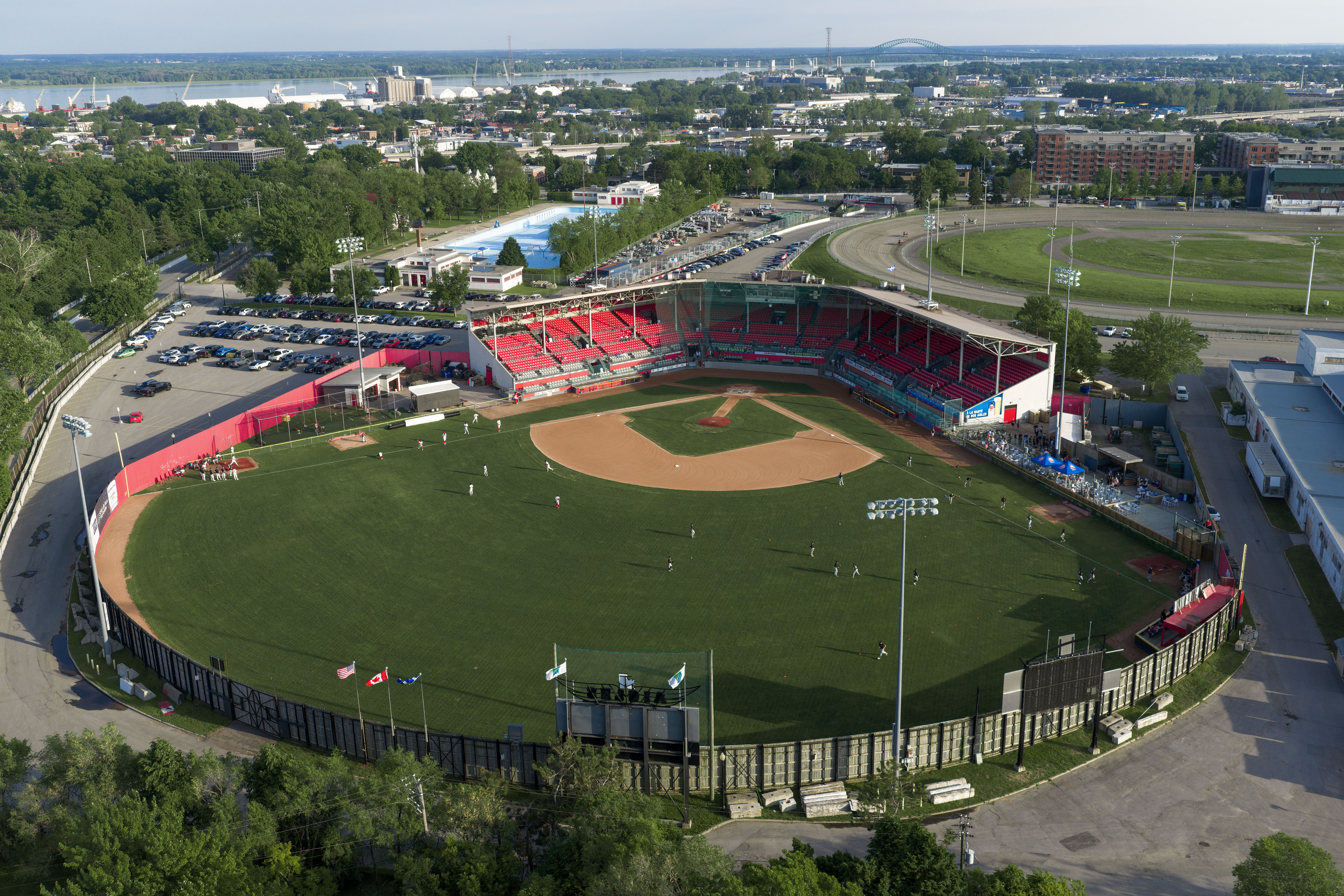
Stade Quillorama

Trois-Rivières has an internationally known racetrack named Circuit Trois-Rivières. The track has hosted American Le Mans Series, SCCA Pro Racing Trans-Am Series, Star Mazda Series, World RX of Canada and the NASCAR Canadian Tire Series events.

In baseball, Trois-Rivières is represented by the Frontier League's Trois-Rivières Aigles, which play their home games at Stade Quillorama. In professional ice hockey, the city is host to the ECHL's Trois-Rivières Lions (farm team of the Montreal Canadiens) beginning with the 2021–22 season, and has had several teams in the Ligue Nord-Américaine de Hockey, typically with home games at the Colisée de Trois-Rivières. The city is also the site of the only remaining pari-mutuel (wagering) harness racing track in Quebec, Hippodrome de Trois-Rivières, which operates live standardbred racing from May through October. In 2014, the hippodrome has resurrected the Prix d'Été, a once major Canadian race for four-year-old pacers that had been contested in Montreal until 1992.

Trois-Rivières had a brief soccer presence in the Canadian Soccer League when Trois-Rivières Attak represented the city from 2007 to 2009. The club served as a feeder team for the Montreal Impact. Their most notable season occurred in 2009, when they won the league double, initially winning the division title and followed with a playoff championship title. In 2010, Montreal ended its affiliation with Trois-Rivières by creating its academy team.

== Government ==
=== City council ===
Since its incorporation in 1845, the city has had thirty-six mayors. The mayor presides over the Trois-Rivières City Council.

=== Municipal reorganization ===
On January 1, 2002, the former city of Trois-Rivières along with its neighbouring towns of Cap-de-la-Madeleine, Sainte-Marthe-du-Cap, Saint-Louis-de-France, Trois-Rivières-Ouest, and the municipality of Pointe-du-Lac, were combined to form the new city of Trois-Rivières.

Trois-Rivières federal election results
Year	Liberal		Conservative		Bloc Québécois		New Democratic		Green	
2021	28%	19,974	28%	19,985	30%	21,061	10%	7,145	1%	908
2019	26%	19,005	24%	17,976	29%	21,673	17%	12,655	2%	1,841
2015	30%	20,814	19%	13,001	17%	11,943	32%	22,131	2%	1,205

Trois-Rivières provincial election results
Year	CAQ		Liberal		QC solidaire		Parti Québécois	
2018	46%	33,676	21%	15,308	15%	11,329	14%	10,429
2014	28%	20,319	36%	26,938	7%	5,020	28%	20,661

== Infrastructure ==
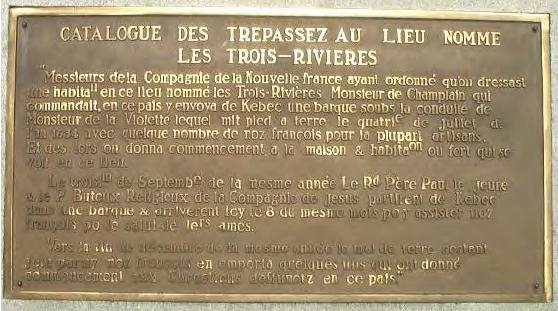
Historical marker commemorating the Sieur de Laviolette, founder of Trois-Rivières in Trois-Rivières.

Local bus service is provided by the Société de transport de Trois-Rivières. The Laviolette Bridge links Trois-Rivières to Bécancour of the Centre-du-Québec administrative region on the south shore of the Saint Lawrence River. The Laviolette Bridge is the only bridge across the Saint Lawrence River between Montreal and Quebec City; therefore it provides an important connection between the north and south shores of the river. Known for its impressive structure, its elegant aesthetics, the bridge has become a major landmark of Trois-Rivières and the Mauricie region. Approximately 40,000 vehicles cross the bridge each day. An airport also serves the city. There are currently no scheduled flights operating out of the airport. The nearest airports to the city are Québec City Jean Lesage International Airport, located 123 km (76 mi) north east and Montréal–Trudeau International Airport, located 177 km (110 mi) south west of the city.

Passenger rail service was provided to Trois-Rivières station as recently as 1990, but was suspended as part of service cuts by Via Rail. In 2022 Via Rail proposed adding passenger rail service again to Trois-Rivières as part of its High Frequency Rail project that would link Toronto, Ottawa, Montréal and Québec City.

On April 8, 2014, during morning commute an SUV fell into a giant pothole in Trois-Rivières caused by heavy rain accumulation. Nobody was injured during the incident.

The city hosts a major ice-free port on the Saint Lawrence River, handling about 300 ships per annum.

== Education ==
Trois-Rivières is home to the Université du Québec à Trois-Rivières, and the Mauricie Campus of the Université de Montréal, a satellite campus for the university's faculty of medicine.

== Notable people ==
- Claude-Jean Allouez
- Jean-Baptiste Badeaux
- George Baptist
- Jacques Baudry de Lamarche
- Guillaume Baudry
- Jean-Baptiste Baudry
- Jean-Christophe Beaulieu
- Pierre-Stanislas Bédard
- Norman Iceberg
- Steve Bégin
- Claude-Michel Bégon de la Cour
- Jean Béliveau
- Mathew Bell
- Marc-André Bergeron
- Amable Berthelot
- Guy Bertrand
- François Bigot (royal notary)
- Raymond Blaise Des Bergères de Rigauville
- Louis-Charles Boucher de Niverville
- Pierre Boucher
- Marc-Antoine Bras-De-Fer de Chateaufort
- François-Joseph Bressani
- Ralph Burton
- Jacques Buteux
- Jean Carignan
- Edward Carter (Canadian politician)
- François de Champflour
- Pierre Chastellain
- Thomas Coffin (pre-confederation Canadian politician)
- John Conley
- Thomas Cooke (bishop)
- Gilles Courteau
- Guillaume Couture
- Antoine de Crisafy
- Lemuel Cushing
- Jean Bouillet de la Chassaigne
- Jacques De Noyon
- Joseph Denis
- Médard des Groseilliers
- Jean Desfossés
- François Desjordy Moreau de Cabanac
- Jean-Baptiste-Éric Dorion
- Josué Dubois Berthelot de Beaucours
- Josephte Dufresne
- Pierre-Benjamin Dumoulin
- Maurice Duplessis
- André Dupont
- Henry Edward Clarke
- Madeleine Ferron
- Peter Frederick Haldimand
- Marie-Anne Gaboury
- François de Galiffet de Caffin
- Pierre Gaultier de Varennes, sieur de La Vérendrye
- René Gaultier de Varennes
- Charles-Borromée Genest
- Samuel Genest
- René Godefroy, sieur de Linctot
- Gérald Godin
- William Grant (fur trader)
- François Gravé Du Pont
- Edward Greive
- Annie Groovie
- Jean Grou
- Bartholomew Gugy
- Conrad Gugy
- Louis Gugy
- Guillaume Guillemot
- Frederick Haldimand
- Benjamin Hart (businessman)
- Aaron Hart
- Moses Hart
- Ezekiel Hart
- William Henry Lee
- Jean-Baptiste Hertel de Rouville
- Jean-Baptiste-Melchior Hertel de Rouville
- Joseph-François Hertel de la Fresnière
- Henry Judah
- Simon Kean
- René-Joseph Kimber
- Joseph de La Roche Daillon
- Urbain Lafontaine
- Claude G. Lajoie
- Nicolas-Eustache Lambert Dumont
- Alexandre Landry
- Alexandre Landry
- Sieur de Laviolette
- Étienne Le Blanc
- Joseph-Dominique-Emmanuel Le Moyne de Longueuil
- Paul-Joseph Le Moyne de Longueuil
- Félix Leclerc
- John Lees (politician)
- Charles Legardeur de Tilly
- Michel Leneuf de la Vallière de Beaubassin
- Jacques Leneuf de La Poterie
- Thomas-Jean-Jacques Loranger
- Alexander MacKay (fur trader)
- Constant le Marchand de Lignery
- Louis-Philippe Mariauchau d'Esgly
- Eisha Marjara
- Martyr
- Dominique Mondelet (seigneur)
- Jean-Marie Mondelet
- Nicholas Montour
- Charles le Moyne de Longueuil et de Châteauguay
- Charles le Moyne de Longueuil, Baron de Longueuil
- The New Cities
- Louis-Philippe Normand
- Édouard-Louis Pacaud
- Phillip Louis (Phil) Perew
- Joseph-François Perrault
- Étienne Pézard de la Tousche Champlain
- Antoine Polette
- François Poulin de Francheville
- François Provost
- Serge Quesnel
- Pierre-Esprit Radisson
- Claude de Ramezay
- Étienne Ranvoyzé
- Ghyslain Raza
- Charles Richard Ogden
- Louis-François Richer Laflèche
- Frederika Charlotte Riedesel
- François-Pierre Rigaud de Vaudreuil
- Pierre de Rigaud, Marquis de Vaudreuil-Cavagnial
- René Robert
- Louis Roy
- Pierre de Sales Laterrière
- James Smith (1806–68)
- Paul St-Pierre Plamondon
- Jean-Guy Talbot
- Luc Tardif
- Éric Thériault
- William Thompson (general)
- Luc Tousignant
- Joseph-Édouard Turcotte
- Richard Vallée
- Joseph-Rémi Vallières de Saint-Réal
- Doris Veillette
- Pierre Vézina
- Jean Victor Allard
- Denis Villeneuve
- Henri Wittmann
- Mikaël Zewski

== Sister cities ==
- Châteaudun, France
- Tours, France
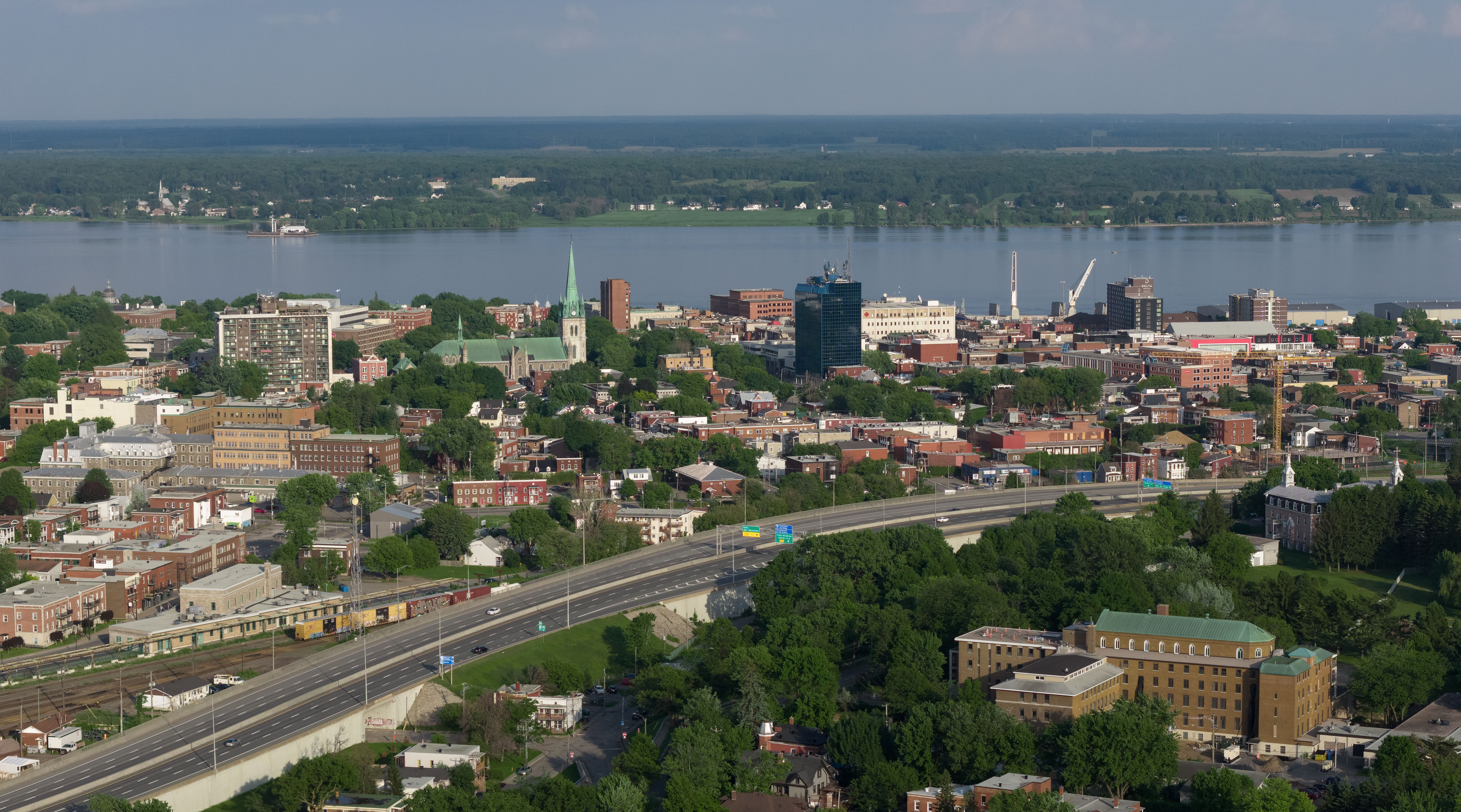

== See also ==
- 1925 Charlevoix–Kamouraska earthquake
- École secondaire Chavigny
- Évêques-de-Trois-Rivières Mausoleum
- List of population centres in Quebec
- List of regional county municipalities and equivalent territories in Quebec
- List of towns in New France
- List of towns in Quebec
- Marcel-Léger Ecological Reserve
- Millette River
