= François de Galiffet de Caffin =

Military officer in New France

François de Galiffet de Caffin (1666 – 1746) was a military officer in New France. He served as governor of Trois-Rivières from 1709 to 1720.

The son of Pierre de Galiffet, seigneur of Honon, and Marguerite de Bonfils, he was born in Provence and came to New France in 1688. In 1689, he was named commandant at Trois-Rivières and, in 1692, town mayor of Quebec City. He married Catherine, the daughter of Charles Aubert de La Chesnaye in 1697. From 1699 to 1708, Galiffet served as king's lieutenant at Montreal. In 1705, he received the cross of Saint-Louis. As governor of Trois-Rivières, he reestablished the town's garrison. Galiffet recommended that the secular clergy be given charge of the parish, which was held by the Recollets, and was criticized by the clergy there for his scandalous life-style.

Gallifet returned to France in 1720 and retired to Avignon.
