= François Provost =

Canadian politician

- Born: 1638; Paris
- Died: June 1, 1702 (aged 63–64); Quebec City
- Spouse: Geneviève Macard
- Parent(s): Charles Provost, Jeanne Du Gousset

François Provost (1638 – 1 June 1702) was a career soldier from France who served in the Carignan-Salières regiment which was stationed to New France in 1665.

Provost was held in high esteem by Buade de Frontenac from early in his residency in Canada. He served as governor of Trois-Rivières, temporary Governor of Montreal and temporary governor of the country after the recall of Antoine Lefèbvre de La Barre.
