= Sainte-Marthe-du-Cap =

Former city in Quebec

Coordinates: 46°22′36.3″N 72°29′30.3″W

Sainte-Marthe-du-Cap (French pronunciation: [sɛ̃t maʁtə dy kap]) is a former city in Quebec, Canada on the St. Lawrence River. It was amalgamated into the City of Trois-Rivières in 2002. Its population as of the 2001 census was 6,192.
