= Michel Leneuf du Hérisson =

Michel Leneuf du Hérisson (ca. 1601, Caen – October 1672, Trois-Rivières) was a French-born administrator, nobleman, and businessman in the colony of Canada in the 17th century. In 1636, he and his family, which included his younger brother Jacques Leneuf, left Normandy and were the first of the French nobility to settle in the colony of New France, alongside their in-laws the Legardeurs.

== Biography ==
He became one of the principal landholders and seigneurs in Canada, being granted several fiefs, and in 1645 was a co-founder and director along with his brother Jacques, of the Communauté des Habitants, a fur company that took over the mandate of the Company of One Hundred Associates for several years, before reverting under direct control of the Crown. He was appointed as Lieutenant-General of the regional government of Trois-Rivières in 1664 (one of three regional governments of Canada along with Montréal and Québec during that period), a post he held until his death in October 1672, except for a brief period in 1665 when he was suspended by the Sovereign Council of Canada due to illicit trading with the Native Americans. He sat as Interim Governor of the Trois-Rivières region in 1668.

He had one daughter named Anne from an unknown relationship back in Normandy, who in 1647 married in Canada, Antoine Desrosiers, master carpenter and bourgeois of Trois-Rivières, who himself would go on to become a judge. They had eight children, and a large number of people today in North America and beyond can trace their descent to this family.
