= Charles Legardeur de Tilly =

- Born: 1616; Thury-Harcourt-le-Hom
- Died: 10 November 1695 (aged 78–79); Quebec City
- Occupations: Merchant, Fur trader and official
- Spouse: Geneviève Juchereau
- Children: 15
- Relatives: Pierre Legardeur de Repentigny - Brother

Charles Legardeur de Tilly (1616 – November 10, 1695) was a merchant, fur trader, seigneur and official in New France. He served as governor of Trois-Rivières from 1648 to 1650 and as a member of the Sovereign Council of New France from 1663 to 1688.

The son of René Legardeur de Tilly and Catherine de Cordé, he was born at Thury-Harcourt and came to New France in 1636 with his brother Pierre. He married Geneviève, the daughter of Jean Juchereau de Maur, in 1648. In partnership with François Byssot de la Rivière and Jean-Paul Godefroy, Tilly hunted seals at Tadoussac and traded in beaver pelts. In the fall of 1650, he returned to France to acquire the fishing monopoly at Tadoussac from the Company of One Hundred Associates.

In 1652, he acquired the seigneury of Cap-des-Rosiers. He was one of the first members of the Sovereign Council of New France and was named a life member of the Council in 1675. In 1679, following a dispute between the council and Governor Frontenac, he was ordered by Frontenac to withdraw from Quebec City; at that time, he moved to Beauport. Tilly subsequently submitted to Frontenac and returned to the Council, serving until 1688, when his son Pierre-Noël became a member. He died at Quebec City seven years later.
