= François-Joseph Bissot =

18th-century merchant and navigator of Quebec, Canada

Jean Baptiste Bissot, Sieur de Vincennes
- Born: 19 May 1673; New France
- Died: 11 December 1737 (aged 64); New France
- Parent(s): François Byssot de la Rivière; Marie Couillard

François-Joseph Bissot (19 May 1673 – 11 December 1737) was a son of François Byssot de la Rivière and was a member of the Quebec bourgeois.

Bissot had a varied career as a merchant and navigator but is best known as a co-seigneur of Mingan, the other being his brother, Jean-Baptiste Bissot de Vincennes.
