= Jean-Baptiste Legardeur de Repentigny =

- Born: 1632; Thury-Harcourt-le-Hom
- Died: 10 November 1709 (aged 76–77); Montreal
- Occupations: Garde-marin, half-pay captain, and councillor
- Title: Esquire
- Spouse: Marguerite Nicolet
- Children: Pierre Legardeur de Repentigny, Jean-Paul Le Gardeur & Augustin le Gardeur de Courtemanche
- Parent(s): Pierre Legardeur de Repentigny & Marie Favery

Jean-Baptiste Legardeur de Repentigny (French pronunciation: [ʒɑ̃ batistə ləɡaʁdœʁ də ʁəpɑ̃tiɲi]; 1632-1709), was born at Thury-Harcourt in Normandy in 1632, and died in Montreal on September 9, 1709. He became a lieutenant 1688 and a half-pay captain 1692 in the Troupes de la Marine, and a garde-marine in the French Navy 1694. He retired with a pension from the military in 1702 and installed as a member of the Conseil Souverain in 1705.

Jean-Baptiste Legardeur arrived in Canada in 1636 with his parents. He became associated with the fur trade at an early age. On October 6, 1663, he was elected the first mayor of Quebec City. He occupied this office for only one month, since the Conseil Souverain considered it unnecessary. Legardeur commanded volunteer companies against the Iroquois in 1665 and 1666. He received from his mother the seigneury of Repentigny on May 2, 1670, which had been granted by the Compagnie de la Nouvelle France in 1647 to his father. His wife was Marguerite Nicolet, the daughter of French explorer Jean Nicolet.
