= List of shipwrecks in October 1871 =

The list of shipwrecks in October 1871 includes ships sunk, foundered, grounded, or otherwise lost during October 1871.

== 1 October ==
List of shipwrecks: 1 October 1871
Ship	State	Description
Antoine Marie	France	The ship departed from Bathurst, Gambia Colony and Protectorate for Marseille, Bouches-du-Rhône. No further trace, presumed foundered with the loss of all hands.
Enigheden	Germany	The ship was driven ashore at Pillau. Her crew were rescued.
Enterprise	United Kingdom	The schooner collided with the paddle steamer Scotia (United Kingdom) in the Sloyne. She was on a voyage from Goole, Yorkshire to Liverpool, Lancashire. Enterprise was towed in to Tranmere, Cheshire in a sinking condition.
George Brown	United Kingdom	The schooner was driven ashore at Aberdeen. She was refloated.
Kron Prins Friedrich Wilhelm	Germany	The ship was driven ashore and wrecked at "Bagdad", Mexico.
Oberon	United Kingdom	The ship was lost near Montevideo, Uruguay with the loss of a crew member. She was on a voyage from Middlesbrough, Yorkshire to Buenos Aires, Argentina.

== 2 October ==
List of shipwrecks: 2 October 1871
Ship	State	Description
Alert	United Kingdom	The ship was driven ashore at Brielle, South Holland, Netherlands.
Annie	United Kingdom	The barque ran aground on the Herd Sand, in the North Sea off the coast of County Durham. Her crew were rescued by the South Shields Lifeboat. She floated off and drove ashore at South Shields, County Durham.
Bangkok	United Kingdom	The ship was wrecked on the coast of Tabasco, Mexico.
Catherine Christiana	Norway	The brigantine was driven ashore and wrecked at Dunkirk, Nord. Her crew were rescued.
Haabet	Norway	The ship was driven ashore and severely damaged at Boulogne, Pas-de-Calais, France. Her crew were rescued. She was on a voyage from Fredrikshald, Norway to Saint-Valery-sur-Somme, Somme.
Hyacinth	United Kingdom	The coal hulk was driven ashore and sank at Portsmouth, Hampshire.
James	United Kingdom	The ship was driven ashore at Hellevoetsluis, Zeeland, Netherlands. She was on a voyage from Newcastle upon Tyne, Northumberland to Rotterdam, South Holland, Netherlands.
Jeune Alexander	France	The ship was driven ashore near Boulogne. Her crew were rescued. She was on a voyage from Tréguier, Côtes-du-Nord to Saint-Valery-sur-Somme.
Lord Hardinge	United Kingdom	The ship was wrecked on the Corona Reef, in the West Indies. Her crew were rescued. She was on a voyage from Glasgow, Renfrewshire to Mayagüez, Puerto Rico.
Lotus	United Kingdom	The ship was wrecked in the Tamar Pass with the loss of two lives.
Northumbria	United Kingdom	The ship was driven ashore at Barber's Point, in the Dardanelles. She was on a voyage from the Clyde to Constantinople, Ottoman Empire. She was refloated and resumed her voyage.
Regina	United Kingdom	The brig ran aground on the Knock Sand, in the North Sea off Skegness, Lincolnshire and was abandoned by her crew.
Rosalie	France	The schooner foundered 8 nautical miles (15 km) south west of the La Coubre Lighthouse, Charente-Inférieure. Her crew were rescued.
Susannah	United Kingdom	The schooner foundered off Hartlepool, County Durham. Her crew were rescued. She was on a voyage from South Shields, County Durham to Middlesbrough, Yorkshire.
Tanner	United Kingdom	The brig ran aground at Hartlepool. She was on a voyage from London to Hartlepool. She was refloated with the assistance of some tugs.
Venus	United Kingdom	The ship ran aground on the Horse Bank, in the Irish Sea off the coast of Lancashire. She was on a voyage from Dundalk, County Louth to Preston, Lancashire.

== 3 October ==
List of shipwrecks: 3 October 1871
Ship	State	Description
Alcyon	France	The schooner was driven ashore and wrecked 3 nautical miles (5.6 km) west north west of the La Coubre Lighthouse, Charente-Inférieure.
Emily	United Kingdom	The steamship ran aground on the Shipwash Sand, in the North Sea off the coast of Suffolk. Her crew were rescued by the steamship Maas (Netherlands). Emily was on a voyage from Goole, Yorkshire to London. She was later refloated and completed her voyage.
Ingeborg Caroline	Norway	The ship foundered in the North Sea. Her crew were rescued. She was on a voyage from Fécamp, Seine-Inférieure, France to a Norwegian port.
Johanna Paulina	Netherlands	The schooner was driven ashore at Höganäs, Sweden. She was on a voyage from Newcastle upon Tyne, Northumberland, United Kingdom to Riga, Russia. She was refloated with assistance and resumed her voyage.
Nevo	Italy	The ship was driven ashore on Ven, Sweden. She was on a voyage from Livorno to Saint Petersburg, Russia.
Plover	United States	The ship was wrecked.
Progress	United Kingdom	The ship was assisted in to Burghead, Moray in a sinking condition. She was on a voyage from Fraserburgh, Aberdeenshire to Königsberg, Germany.
Rachel Amalie	Denmark	The schooner was driven ashore and wrecked near Kirkcaldy, Fife, United Kingdom with the loss of a crew member. She was on a voyage from Charlestown, Cornwall, United Kingdom to Wadsøe, Norway. She was refloated on 16 October.

== 4 October ==
List of shipwrecks: 4 October 1871
Ship	State	Description
Eva	Russia	The schooner was wrecked near Travemünde, Germany. Her crew were rescued.
Evesham	United Kingdom	The ship was run into by a smack and sank at Bristol, Gloucestershire.
John Watson	United Kingdom	The schooner collided with the barque Thomas Knox (United Kingdom) and sank off Great Yarmouth, Norfolk. Her crew were rescued by a yawl. John Watson was on a voyage from Newcastle upon Tyne, Northumberland to Great Yarmouth.
Mary and Eliza	United Kingdom	The schooner collided with Empire (United Kingdom) in the River Mersey. She was beached at Rock Ferry, Cheshire with assistance from the tug Fire King (United Kingdom).
Witch of the Seas	United Kingdom	The ship collided with the steamship Istrian and was abandoned off Cape Finisterre, Spain. Her crew were rescued by Istrian. Witch of the Seas was on a voyage from Leith, Lothian to Livorno, Italy.

== 5 October ==
List of shipwrecks: 5 October 1871
Ship	State	Description
Fanny	United Kingdom	The schooner collided with the barque Nicholas Drago (Italy) and foundered off Lynmouth, Devon. One of her three crew got aboard the barque, the others took to a boat and reached shore. She was on a voyage from Bridgwater, Somerset to Tenby, Pembrokeshire.
Ingeborg	Sweden	The steamship was wrecked on the Horn Reef. She was on a voyage from Bordeaux, Gironde, France to Saint Petersburg, Russia. She floated off and came ashore at Hune, Denmark.
Margaret	United Kingdom	The brig departed from Arkhangelsk, Russia for London. No further trace, presumed foundered with the loss of all hands.
Midlothian	New Zealand	The 15-ton ketch stranded on the bar at the mouth of the Wairoa River and became a complete wreck.
Sinbad	United Kingdom	The ship was lost near Yloilo, Spanish East Indies. Her crew were rescued on 7 October by the steam launch Dola (United Kingdom). Sinbad was on a voyage from Manila to Yloilo.

== 6 October ==
List of shipwrecks: 6 October 1871
Ship	State	Description
Belpore	United Kingdom	The ship ran aground on the Pluckington Bank, in Liverpool Bay. She was on a voyage from Liverpool, Lancashire to Birkenhead, Cheshire and Calcutta, India. She was refloated the next day and towed in to Birkenhead.
City of Venice	United Kingdom	The ship was wrecked at Rodrigues. Her crew survived. She was on a voyage from the Clyde to Bombay, India. The wreck broke up on 7 November.
Defiance	United Kingdom	The ship was wrecked near Port Natal, Cape Colony. She was on a voyage from Bombay to Liverpool.
Idelette	United Kingdom	The brig was driven ashore at Sulina, Ottoman Empire. She was later refloated.
Lake Michigan	United States	The ship ran aground in Lake St. Peter. She was on a voyage from Montreal, Quebec, Canada to Glasgow, Renfrewshire, United Kingdom. She was refloated on 8 October.
Manchester	United Kingdom	The schooner departed from Stockholm, Sweden for Barrow-in-Furness, Lancashire. No further trace, presumed foundered with the loss of all hands.
Ocean	France	The barque ran aground on the Holme Sand, in the North Sea off the coast of Suffolk, United Kingdom. She was on a voyage from Dunkirk, Nord to Newcastle upon Tyne, Northumberland, United Kingdom. She was refloated.
Origin	(United Kingdom of Great Britain and Ireland) Jersey	The brigantine was driven ashore and severely damaged at Cape Cove, Newfoundland Colony.
Peto	United Kingdom	The fishing boat was run down and sunk by a steamship off Great Yarmouth, Norfolk with the loss of all eleven crew.
Shannon	United Kingdom	The paddle tug collided with the steamship Princess Alice (United Kingdom) and sank at South Shields, County Durham.
Trial	United Kingdom	The schooner was driven ashore and wrecked at Cape Cove.
Unnamed	Norway	The yacht was driven ashore and wrecked at "Warnit's Hoved", near Aabenraa, Denmark.

== 7 October ==
List of shipwrecks: 7 October 1871
Ship	State	Description
Augusta	Germany	The barquentine was driven ashore on Skagen, Denmark. She was on a voyage from Sunderland, County Durham, United Kingdom to Stettin.
Britannia	United Kingdom	The Yorkshire Billyboy foundered in the North Sea off Ingoldmells, Lincolnshire. Her crew were rescued by the tug Spindrift (United Kingdom. Britannia was on a voyage from Woodbridge, Suffolk to Hull, Yorkshire.
Keith	United Kingdom	The ship was severely damaged by fire at Gatehouse of Fleet, Wigtownshire.
Louisa	United Kingdom	The ship ran aground and sank in the Somme. She was on a voyage from Neath, Glamorgan to Abbeville, Somme, France. She was refloated on 11 October and taken in to Saint-Valery-sur-Somme in a severely damaged condition.
Major Anderson	United States	Sailing in dense smoke from forest fires and heavy gale conditions, the three-masted barkentine ran aground in Lake Michigan on the coast of Wisconsin on Rawley Point near the mouth of Molash Creek 4 miles (6.4 km) north of Two Rivers. Her wreck, discovered in May 2013 by ultralight aircraft pilots, lies in 3 to 10 feet (0.9 to 3 meters) of water at 44°10.928′N 087°30.978′W in the Wisconsin Shipwreck Coast National Marine Sanctuary.
Michael	Germany	The ship was driven ashore and wrecked on Skagen. She was on a voyage from Bristol, Gloucestershire, United Kingdom to Memel.

== 8 October ==
List of shipwrecks: 8 October 1871
Ship	State	Description
Braziliera	Italy	The ship foundered in the Black Sea. Her crew survived. She was on a voyage from Odesa, Russia to a British port.
Empire	United Kingdom	The brigantine collided with the barque Appendix (United Kingdom) 10 nautical miles (19 km) south west of the Wolf Rock, Cornwall. Empire foundered the next day. Her crew were rescued. She was on a voyage from Swansea, Glamorgan to Bordeaux, Gironde, France.
Francisca Avigna	Italy	The barque was driven ashore at "Cranfield", County Antrim, United Kingdom. She was refloated and towed in to Warrenpoint, County Antrim.
George L. Newman	United States	Great Peshtigo Fire: During a voyage from Little Suamico, Wisconsin, with a cargo of lumber, the 122-foot (37 m) barkentine ran aground and was wrecked in dense smoke off Marinette County, Wisconsin, in Green Bay near the southeast point of Green Island. The wreck became covered in sand and was forgotten until it was rediscovered on 13 August 2023.

== 9 October ==
List of shipwrecks: 9 October 1871
Ship	State	Description
Anna	United Kingdom	The brigantine ran aground on the Corton Sand, in the North Sea off the coast of Suffolk. She was refloated and resumed her voyage.
Daybreak	United Kingdom	The ship struck rocks off Moanda, French Equatorial Africa. She was being towed from "Cabanda" to Banana, Africa.
Grietje Koens	Netherlands	The ship sprang a leak and sank south of Öland, Sweden. Her crew were rescued. She was on a voyage from Newcastle upon Tyne, Northumberland, United Kingdom to Saint Petersburg, Russia.
Hebe	Netherlands	The ship was driven ashore on Öland. She was on a voyage from Vyborg, Grand Duchy of Finland to Amsterdam, South Holland.
Macmahon	Norway	The ship was wrecked on a reef off Anholt, Denmark. She was on a voyaged from Sunderland to Nakskov.
Quanza	Germany	The steamship ran aground at Pillau. She was refloated with assistance from the steamship Merkur (Germany).

== 10 October ==
List of shipwrecks: 10 October 1871
Ship	State	Description
Queen	United Kingdom	The schooner collided with the steamship Glengarnock (United Kingdom) and sank at Liverpool, Lancashire. Her crew were rescued. She was on a voyage from Garston, Lancashire to Belfast, County Antrim.

== 11 October ==
List of shipwrecks: 11 October 1871
Ship	State	Description
Dove	Canada	The ship ran aground in Lake St. Peter. She was on a voyage from Montreal, Quebec to Montevideo, Uruguay. She was refloated on 14 October and taken in to Quebec City.
Juan Rattray	United States	The barque ran aground on the Jocine Bank, off Hong Kong and sank.
Nonpareil	United Kingdom	The ship foundered in the Atlantic Ocean with the loss of all but three of the 22 people on board. Survivors were rescued by the schooner Delmont (United States). Nonpareil was on a voyage from Bombay, India to New York.
Prosperine	United Kingdom	The brig ran aground and sank off Dieppe, Seine-Inférieure, France.
Quebec	Canada	The steamship ran aground at the mouth of the St. Charles River. Her passengers were taken off.
Santander	Spain	The steamship ran aground on the Blacktail Sand, in the Thames Estuary. She was refloated.

== 12 October ==
List of shipwrecks: 12 October 1871
Ship	State	Description
Alma	Canada	Hurricane No. 8:The schooner was driven ashore at LaHave, Nova Scotia.
Amelia	United Kingdom	The schooner collided with the steamship Oscar (German Empire) and sank off Dragør, Denmark. Her crew were rescued. Amelia was on a voyage from Kronstadt, Russia to Bo'ness, Lothian.
Aurora	Canada	Hurricane No. 8:The ship was driven ashore at Hubbards, Nova Scotia and became hogged.
Bee	United Kingdom	The ship foundered 5 nautical miles (9.3 km) west of Strumble Head, Pembrokeshire. Her crew survived. She was on a voyage from Caernarfon to Newport, Monmouthshire.
Busy	Canada	Hurricane No. 8:The schooner was driven ashore at LaHave.
Chase	Canada	Hurricane No. 8:The steamship was driven ashore at Halifax, Nova Scotia.
Chilian	Canada	Hurricane No. 8:The brigantine was driven ashore at LaHave.
Ella Vall	United Kingdom	Hurricane No. 8:The brig was wrecked at Liverpool, Nova Scotia.
Fanny	United States	Hurricane No. 8:The barque was driven ashore at Tufts Cove, Nova Scotia and was severely damaged. She was on a voyage from New York to Amsterdam, North Holland, Netherlands. Fanny had been refloated by 24 October and taken in to Halifax for repairs.
Fitz E. Riggs	United States	Hurricane No. 8: The fishing schooner sank in a hurricane on the Georges Bank. Lost with all 9 crew.
Mary	United Kingdom	The schooner sank off Ailsa Craig, in the Firth of Clyde. Her crew were rescued.
Nina	United Kingdom	Hurricane No. 8:The ship was driven ashore in the Bedford Basin. She was on a voyage from Liverpool, Lancashire to Halifax. She had been refloated by 24 October and taken in to Halifax.
Northumberland	United Kingdom	The brig ran aground on th Newcombe Sands, in the North Sea off the coast of Suffolk. She was on a voyage from Dunkirk, Nord to Blyth, Northumberland.
Northumbrian	United Kingdom	Hurricane No. 8:The barque was damaged in a hurricane at Halifax.
Princess of Wales	United Kingdom	Hurricane No. 8:The ship was driven ashore and wrecked at Grand-Métis, Quebec, Canada. She was on a voyage from Quebec City to the Clyde.
Russia	United Kingdom	Hurricane No. 8:The ship ran aground on "Crane Island". She was on a voyage from Troon, Ayrshire to Quebec City, Canada. She was refloated and taken in to Quebec City.
Union	Canada	Hurricane No. 8:The barque was driven ashore at LaHave.
W. H. Hatfield	United States	Hurricane No. 8:The schooner was driven ashore and wrecked at Halifax.
Two unnamed vessels	United Kingdom	A brig and a schooner were driven ashore at Honfleur, Manche, France.

== 13 October ==
List of shipwrecks: 13 October 1871
Ship	State	Description
Aeron Lass	United Kingdom	The brigantine was driven ashore at the Old Head of Kinsale, County Cork. Her crew were rescued by rocket apparatus. She was on a voyage from Newport, Monmouthshire to Queenstown, County Cork.
Carlos	Argentina	The barque ran aground on the Filey Brigg, in the North Sea off the coast of Yorkshire, United Kingdom. She was on a voyage from Antwerp, Belgium to South Shields, County Durham, United Kingdom.
Eflingham	United Kingdom	The ship was driven ashore and wrecked on Naissaar, Russia. Her crew survived. She was on a voyage from Hull, Yorkshire to Kronstadt, Russia.
Fresh Breeze	United Kingdom	The ship ran aground in Lake St. Peter. She was on a voyage from Montreal, Quebec, Canada to Queenstown, County Cork. She was refloated on 17 October and taken in to Quebec City.
Jewess	United Kingdom	The schooner sprang a leak and was beached at Campbeltown, Argyllshire. She was on a voyage from Runcorn, Cheshire to Londonderry.
Maria	Netherlands	The ship was driven ashore and wrecked on Naissar. Her crew survived. She was on a voyage from Harlingen, Friesland to Loviisa, Grand Duchy of Finland.
Sanda	United Kingdom	The steamship ran aground in the Clyde at Erskine, Renfrewshire. She was refloated on 15 October and taken in to Greenock.

== 14 October ==
List of shipwrecks: 14 October 1871
Ship	State	Description
Bells, and Laura	United Kingdom; Italy)	The barque Bells collided with the brig Laura in the North Sea 30 nautical miles (56 km) east of Tynemouth, Northumberland and was severely damaged She put back to the River Tyne. Laura was also severely damaged. She was towed in to Leith, Lothian.
Humber	United Kingdom	The hulk struck the wreck of the tug Brother Jonathan (United Kingdom) and was damaged. She was taken in to Hull, Yorkshire.
Lady Melville	United Kingdom	The ship caught fire and sank at Calcutta, India with the loss of two of the 30 people on board.
Leila	France	The schooner struck a rock and was beached in the Isles of Scilly, United Kingdom. She was on a voyage from Cardiff, Glamorgan, United Kingdom to a French port.
Leonidas	New Zealand	The 79-ton schooner foundered after hitting rocks at the entrance to Whangape Harbour.
Reiher	Germany	The steamship ran aground on the Jenkin Sand, in the Thames Estuary. She was on a voyage from Bremen to London, United Kingdom.

== 15 October ==
List of shipwrecks: 15 October 1871
Ship	State	Description
A. H. Badger	United Kingdom	The barque collided with the paddle steamer Nevada (United States) in the mid-Tasman Sea, some 300 nautical miles (560 km) west of North Cape, New Zealand. The barque's rigging was carried away and the hull was holed below the waterline. Those on board took to the lifeboats the next day, from which they were rescued by the crew of the Alice Cameron (Flag unknown). A. H. Badger was on a voyage from Auckland, New Zealand to Sydney, New South Wales.
Aurora	United Kingdom	The steamship ran aground at Gilleleje, Denmark. She was on a voyage from Hull, Yorkshire to Kronstadt, Russia. She was refloated on 17 October and taken in to Copenhagen, Denmark for repairs.
Betty	United Kingdom	The schooner ran aground on the Scheelhoek. She was refloated with assistance from a tug and taken in to Hellevoetsluis, Zeeland, Netherlands.
Ionia	United Kingdom	The ship ran aground off Lagos, Africa and was wrecked with the loss of three of her crew.
Lizzie A. Tarr	United States	The schooner was lost off Manitau, Labrador. crew saved.
Providence	United Kingdom	The schooner was run into by the steamship J. E. McConnell (United Kingdom) and sank in the River Tyne with the loss of five of her six crew.
Richard N. Parker	United Kingdom	The schooner ran aground at Blackwall, Middlesex and was severely damaged.
Sarah Phillips	United Kingdom	The ship was driven ashore and wrecked at East London, Cape Colony. Her crew were rescued. She was on a voyage from London to East London.

== 16 October ==
List of shipwrecks: 16 October 1871
Ship	State	Description
Columbus	United Kingdom	The schooner was driven ashore at Seascale, Cumberland. Her crew were rescued. She was on a voyage from Dublin to Silloth, Cumberland.
Emily	United Kingdom	The ship ran aground on the North Bull, in the Irish Sea off the coast of County Dublin. She was refloated.
Energy	United Kingdom	The barque foundered in the Atlantic Ocean off Paraíba, Brazil. At least six of her crew survived.
Koniggratz	Netherlands	The ship departed from Liverpool, Lancashire, United Kingdom for Saint John, New Brunswick, Canada. No further trace, presumed foundered with the loss of all hands.
Oriental	United Kingdom	The steamship was wrecked near Montevideo, Uruguay.
R. G. Coburn	United States	The steamship foundered in Lake Superior with the loss of 40 of the 58 people on board.
Richard N. Parker	United Kingdom	The schooner ran aground and was severely damaged.

== 17 October ==
List of shipwrecks: 17 October 1871
Ship	State	Description
Ann	United Kingdom	The ship was holed by her anchor and sank at Grainthorpe, Lincolnshire. Her crew were rescued.
Baltic	United Kingdom	The steamship ran aground on the Jordan Flats, in Liverpool Bay. Her passengers were taken off. She was on a voyage from New York to Liverpool, Lancashire. She was refloated with the assistance of tugs and taken in to Birkenhead, Cheshire.
Creole	United Kingdom	The ship was driven ashore near Donaghadee, County Down. She was on a voyage from Maryport, Cumberland to Dublin.
Ella Moore	United Kingdom	The barque caught fire in the River Thames at Erith, Kent.
Ganjam	France	The ship was wrecked on the Folly Reef. Her crew survived. She was on a voyage from Newport, Monmouthshire, United Kingdom to Jamaica
Jane Sawyer	United Kingdom	The ship ran aground in the Pentland Firth. She was on a voyage from "Ballochinlisk" to Dundee, Forfarshire. She was refloated and taken in to Wick, Caithness.
Rout	United Kingdom	The schooner caught fire in the River Thames at Erith.
Unnamed	United Kingdom	The schooner caught fire in the River Thames at Erith.

== 18 October ==
List of shipwrecks: 18 October 1871
Ship	State	Description
Annie Broughton	United Kingdom	The steamship ran aground on the Haisborough Sands, in the North Sea off the coast of Norfolk. She was on a voyage from South Shields to Alexandria, Egypt. She was refloated the next day and towed into Great Yarmouth, Norfolk.
Bergen	Norway	The steamship struck a rock near Mandal and was wrecked. She was on a voyage from Bergen to Christiania.
Gustav	Germany	The ship sank at Swinemünde. She was on a voyage from Newcastle upon Tyne, Northumberland, United Kingdom to Swinemünde. She was refloated and taken in to Stettin.
Mary Ann	United Kingdom	The schooner struck the Maiden Rocks and was abandoned. She subsequently sank. She was on a voyage from Belfast, County Antrim to Ayr.
Octaire	France	The lugger was driven ashore at Wells-next-the-Sea, Norfolk. She was refloated on 24 October and taken in to Wells-next-the-Sea.
Phillis	United Kingdom	The ship was driven ashore at the Kilcredaun Lighthouse, County Clare. She was on a voyage from Limerick to South Shields, County Durham. She sank the next day. Her crew were rescued.
Scawfell	United Kingdom	The ship caught fire. She consequently put in to Saint Helena. She was on a voyage from Tuticorin, India to London.

== 19 October ==
List of shipwrecks: 19 October 1871
Ship	State	Description
Byzantium	United States	The 179-ton whaling brig struck a reef in Weynton Passage (50°35′N 126°49′W) in Johnstone Strait off the northeast coast of Vancouver Island, British Columbia, Canada, then slid off the reef and sank in 360 feet (110 m) of water.
Clifford	United Kingdom	The ship was abandoned in the Atlantic Ocean south of Cape Horn, Chile. Her crew were rescued by S. Curling (United Kingdom). Clifford was on a voyage from South Shields, County Durham to San Francisco, California, United States.
Eripli	Russia	The barque sprang a leak and was beached on Zakynthos, Greece.
Garibaldi	Norway	The barque was wrecked at "Nisige Can Satalo". Her crew were rescued.
Unnamed	United Kingdom	The Humber Keel was run into by the steamship Ant (United Kingdom) and sank at Walkerith, Lincolnshire. Her crew were rescued.

== 20 October ==
List of shipwrecks: 20 October 1871
Ship	State	Description
Familien	Norway	The ship was driven ashore on Skagen, Denmark. She was on a voyage from Stettin, Germany to Bordeaux, Gironde, France.
Scotia	United States	The ship ran aground on the Corton Sand, in the North Sea off the coast of Suffolk, United Kingdom. She was on a voyage from Hamburg, Germany to Cardiff, Glamorgan, United Kingdom. She was refloated and resumed her voyage.
St. Clair	United Kingdom	The barque was wrecked on the coast of the Natal Colony with the loss of a crew member.
Time is Money	United Kingdom	The ship ran aground on the Zuidergrunden, off the Dutch coast. She was on a voyage from Plymouth, Devon to Stettin. She had floated off by 23 October and was wrecked on the Norderhaaks Sandbank.
Zephyr	United Kingdom	The brigantine ran aground in the Horse Channel, off the coast of Lancashire. She was on a voyage from Santos, Brazil to Liverpool, Lancashire. She was refloated and taken into Liverpool.

== 21 October ==
List of shipwrecks: 21 October 1871
Ship	State	Description
Exampler	United Kingdom	The ship was driven ashore at Stornoway, Isle of Lewis, Outer Hebrides. She was on a voyage from Runcorn, Cheshire to a Baltic port.
Hercules	Netherlands	The ship was driven ashore at Visby, Gotland, Sweden. She was on a voyage from Riga, Russia to Schiedam, South Holland.
Jean Louis	India	The barque ran aground and sank 40 nautical miles (74 km) east of the Eastern Channel Lightship ( Trinity House). Her crew too to two boats; five of the 38 people in one of the boats died before the survivors were rescued on 31 October by the steamship Glengartney (United Kingdom). Those in the other boat were reported missing. Jean Louis was on a voyage from Moulmein, Burma to Calcutta.
Leonie	France	The brig was wrecked on the Haisborough Sands, in the North Sea off the cost of Norfolk, United Kingdom. Her crew were rescued. She was on a voyage from Redon, Ille-et-Vilaine to Hull, Yorkshire, United Kingdom.
Lina	Germany	The brig foundered in the Atlantic Ocean 50 nautical miles (93 km) south west of Madeira. Her crew were rescued. She was on a voyage from London, United Kingdom to Buenos Aires, Argentina.
Lotus	United Kingdom	The schooner ran aground 3 nautical miles (5.6 km) north of Helsingør, Denmark. She was on a voyage from Peterhead, Aberdeenshire to Stettin, Germany.
San Francisco do Paolo	Portugal	The schooner collided with the schooner Codan (Denmark) and was abandoned off Almuñécar, Spain.
Six Brothers	United Kingdom	The Thames barge ran aground on the Knoll, in the North Sea off the coast of Suffolk. She was on a voyage from Antwerp, Belgium to London. She was refloated with assistance and taken in to Harwich, Essex.

== 22 October ==
List of shipwrecks: 22 October 1871
Ship	State	Description
Emily	United Kingdom	The ship was driven ashore at Pagham, Sussex. She was on a voyage from London to the Cape Coast Castle. She was refloated and towed in to Portsmouth, Hampshire.
Isabella	(United Kingdom of Great Britain and Ireland) Isle of Man	The fishing lugger collided with the fishing lugger Primrose (United Kingdom) and sank 5 nautical miles (9.3 km) off Howth, County Dublin. Her crew were rescued. Isabella was on a voyage from Peel to Howth.
Lanchester	United Kingdom	The steamship ran aground on the Steenendam, off the Dutch coast.
Monsoon	United Kingdom	The ship was abandoned in the Atlantic Ocean. Her crew were rescued. She was on a voyage from Quebec City, Canada to London.
Sea Pink	United Kingdom	The ship departed from South Shields, County Durham for Calcutta, India or Rangoon, Burma. No further trace, presumed foundered with the loss of all hands.

== 23 October ==
List of shipwrecks: 23 October 1871
Ship	State	Description
Astronom	Germany	The steamship ran aground at Honfleur, Manche, France.
Julia Ann	United Kingdom	The ship was wrecked on the Shipwash Sand, in the North Sea off the coast of Suffolk. Her crew took to a boat and landed at Aldeburgh, Suffolk. She was on a voyage from Sunderland, County Durham to Portsmouth, Hampshire.
Oscar	United Kingdom	The steamship was driven ashore on Öland, Sweden. She was on a voyage from Kronstadt, Russia to London. She was refloated on 25 October and resumed her voyage.
Phoenix	United Kingdom	The steamship was driven ashore and wrecked at Nash Point, Glamorgan. Her crew were rescued.
Wellington	United Kingdom	The barque ran aground on the Mouse Sand, in the Thames Estuary.

== 24 October ==
List of shipwrecks: 24 October 1871
Ship	State	Description
Alert	United Kingdom	The ship ran aground on the Cutler Sand, in the North Sea off the coast of Essex. She was refloated and taken in to Harwich, Essex in a severely leaky condition.
Carleton	United Kingdom	The steamship was driven ashore and severely damaged near Waterford. She was refloated.
Clifford	United Kingdom	The steamship was damaged by fire at Liverpool, Lancashire.
Clutha	United Kingdom	The full-rigged ship was wrecked on Anticosti Island, Quebec, Canada. Her crew were rescued. She was on a voyage from Glasgow, Renfrewshire to Quebec City, Canada.
Loch Leven	United Kingdom	The ship was wrecked on a reef of King Island, Tasmania with the loss of her captain. She was on a voyage from Geelong, Victoria to London.
Unnamed	United Kingdom	The ship was sunk at South Shields when a train of 52 coal wagons ran away and overshot the staithes.

== 25 October ==
List of shipwrecks: 25 October 1871
Ship	State	Description
Aparima	New Zealand	The 30-ton ketch was washed ashore by a swell near the entrance to the Mataura River when the wind dropped to a flat calm shortly after she left her moorings.
Flora	United Kingdom	The dandy sank in the English Channel 5 nautical miles (9.3 km) off Hythe, Kent. Her crew were rescued by a fishing boat. She was on a voyage from Rye, Sussex to Dover, Kent.
Harrier	United States	The ship was wrecked near the mouth of the São Francisco River. Her crew were rescued. She was on a voyage from Bahia, Brazil to New York.
J. B. Bradley	United States	The barque collided with the steamship T. E. Foster (United Kingdom) and sank in the English Channel 15 nautical miles (28 km) west of the Isle of Wight, United Kingdom with the loss of two of her nine crew. Survivors were rescued by T. E. Foster. J. B. Bradley was on a voyage from London, United Kingdom to Philadelphia, Pennsylvania.
Magic	United Kingdom	The ship was driven ashore at Blakeney, Norfolk. She was on a voyage from Sunderland, County Durham to Margate, Kent. She was refloated the next day and taken in to Blakeney.
Orsolina	Italy	The brig ran aground at Carlingford, County Louth, United Kingdom. She was on a voyage from Marianople, Russia to Newry, County Antrim, United Kingdom. She was refloated.
Saint Galian	United Kingdom	The steamship was wrecked near Dénia, Spain. Her crew were rescued.

== 26 October ==
List of shipwrecks: 26 October 1871
Ship	State	Description
Covemaster	United Kingdom	The barque ran aground on the Shipwash Sand, in the North Sea off the coast of Suffolk. She was on a voyage from Dundee, Forfarshire to Iquique. Chile. She was refloated and put in to Dover, Kent.
Deo Gloria	Germany	The schooner was driven ashore on Hirsholmene, Denmark. She was on a voyage from Grangemouth, Stirlingshire, United Kingdom to Danzig She was later refloated and taken in to Fredrikshavn, Denmark in a severely leaky condition.
Foreningen	Germany	The brig was driven ashore at Visby, Gotland, Sweden.

== 27 October ==
List of shipwrecks: 27 October 1871
Ship	State	Description
America	Canada	The brig was abandoned 30 nautical miles (56 km) off "Cape del Aresi", Sicily, Italy. She was on a voyage from Licata to Messina, Sicily.
Hope	United Kingdom	The barque ran aground at Southend, Essex. She was refloated.
Jason	United Kingdom	The brigantine sprang a leak in the North Sea and was abandoned by her crew, who were rescued by the steamship Cumberland (United Kingdom). Jason was on a voyage from Newcastle upon Tyne, Northumberland to Brake, Germany.
Jean Moody	United Kingdom	The brig foundered off Achill Island, County Mayo. Her crew were rescued. She was on a voyage from Troon, Ayrshire to Sackville, New Brunswick, Canada.
Lake Huron	Canada	The ship was driven ashore on Île-aux-Ruaux, Quebec. She was on a voyage from the Clyde to Montreal, Quebec. She was refloated and completed her voyage.
Medallion	United Kingdom	The ship ran aground at Quebec City, Canada. She was on a voyage from Quebec City to Newcastle upon Tyne. She was refloated and resumed her voyage.

== 28 October ==
List of shipwrecks: 28 October 1871
Ship	State	Description
Alert	United Kingdom	The brig sprang a leak and sank. Her crew were rescued by Berthold (Germany). Alert was on a voyage from Sunderland, County Durham to Aarhus, Denmark.
Ambrose	United Kingdom	The steamship was damaged by fire at Liverpool, Lancashire.
Lorne	United Kingdom	The schooner departed from Clew Bay for Westport, County Mayo. No further trace, presumed foundered with the loss of all hands.

== 29 October ==
List of shipwrecks: 29 October 1871
Ship	State	Description
Genil	France	The steamship was damaged by a boiler explosion which killed five and injured nine of her crew. She was on a voyage from Seville, Spain to Marseille, Bouches-du-Rhône.
John	United Kingdom	The ship was driven ashore and wrecked at Teignmouth, Devon. Her crew were rescued by the steamship Royal Charlie (United Kingdom). John was on a voyage from Teignmouth to Glasgow, Renfrewshire.
Legontia	Sweden	The schooner ran aground on the Kolholmgrunden, in the Baltic Sea off Trelleborg. She was onh a voyage from London, Yorkshire, United Kingdom to Karlshamn.
Oden	United Kingdom	The barque capsized and was severely damaged at Cardiff, Glamorgan. She was later righted and beached at Penarth, Glamorgan.
Punjaub	United Kingdom	The barque caught fire off the Isle of Arran. She was on a voyage from Ardrossan, Ayrshire to New York United States. The fire was extinguished with assistance from the barque Xenophen (Austria-Hungary).
Seagull	Norway	The barque ran aground at Malmö, Sweden. She was on a voyage from Malmö to Hull, United Kingdom.
Ville de St. Lo	France	The barque was wrecked on the Lucena Shoals, off Paraíba, Brazil. She was on a voyage from Liverpool, Lancashire, United Kingdom to Rio de Janeiro, Brazil.
Zephyr	United Kingdom	The ship ran aground at Wigtown and was destroyed by fire. She was on a voyage from Wigtown to Workington, Cumberland.
Teignmouth Lifeboat	Royal National Lifeboat Institution	The lifeboat was driven ashore at Teignmouth whilst going to the assistance of John (United Kingdom). Her crew were rescued by the steamship Royal Charlie (United Kingdom).

== 30 October ==
List of shipwrecks: 30 October 1871
Ship	State	Description
Arla en Betsy	Netherlands	The ship ran aground on the Dapor Reef. She was on a voyage from Batavia, Netherlands East Indies to Amsterdam, North Holland. She was refloated and put back to Batavia.
Margaret	United Kingdom	The Yorkshire Billyboy was driven ashore at Sidmouth, Devon. Her crew were rescued. She was on a voyage from London to Dartmouth, Devon.
Mont Blanc	United Kingdom	The ship ran aground on the Sizewell Bank, in the North Sea off the coast of Suffolk. She was refloated and put in to Grimsby, Lincolnshire in a leaky condition.
Pansillipo	United Kingdom	The ship was driven ashore at Ramsey, Isle of Man. Her crew were rescued by the Ramsey Lifeboat Two Sisters ( Royal National Lifeboat Institution).
Venezuelan	United Kingdom	The steamship caught fire at Santa Martha and sank at the bows. She was on a voyage from Liverpool, Lancashire to Colón, United States of Colombia. She was refloated and found to be severely damaged, but subsequently resumed her voyage.
Victoria	United Kingdom	The steamship ran aground at Lokoja, Sokoto Caliphate. She was refloated in August 1872.

== 31 October ==
List of shipwrecks: 31 October 1871
Ship	State	Description
Azoff	Flag unknown	The steamship was driven ashore at Amoy, China.
Beryl	United Kingdom	The schooner struck a rock off Flat Holm. She developed a severe leak and was beached near Cardiff, Glamorgan.
Canarias	Spain	The steamship sprang a leak and was beached at Santa Maria Island, Azores. She was then destroyed by fire with the loss of a crew member. She was on a voyage from Havana, Cuba to Cádiz.
Express	United Kingdom	The brigantine was driven ashore and wrecked at Mogador, Morocco. Her crew were rescued.
Maldon	United Kingdom	The barque was abandoned in the Atlantic Ocean. Her crew were rescued by Ann Grey (United Kingdom). Maldon was on a voyage from Quebec City, Canada to Liverpool, Lancashire.
Onega	Russia	The steamship was driven ashore on Naissaar. She was on a voyage from London, United Kingdom to Saint Petersburg. She was refloated and taken in to Reval.
Prindsesse Louise	Sweden	The ship was wrecked near Lemvig, Denmark. She was on a voyage from Torrevieja, Spain to Gothenburg.
Ranger	United Kingdom	The smack ran aground on the Black Rocks, in the Sound of Islay. She was on a voyage from Wick, Caithness to Newry, County Antrim.
River Dee	United Kingdom	The barque was abandoned in the Atlantic Ocean. Her crew were rescued by the barque Canada Belle (United Kingdom). River Dee was on a voyage from Quebec City to Greenock, Renfrewshire. She came ashore near Westport, County Mayo on 2 January 1872 and was wrecked.
Three Anns	United Kingdom	The ship was wrecked on the Maplin Sand, in the North Sea off the coast of Essex. She was on a voyage from Bremerhaven, Germany to London. She was later refloated and taken in to Southend-on-Sea, Essex.

== Unknown date ==
List of shipwrecks: Unknown date in October 1871
Ship	State	Description
Alice	United Kingdom	The ship sprang a leak and was beached at Royan, Charente-Inférieure, France. She was on a voyage from Bilbao, Spain to Middlesbrough, Yorkshire.
Alleanza	France	The ship was driven ashore and wrecked near La Rochelle, Charente-Inférieure. She was on a voyage from Bordeaux, Gironde to Buenos Aires, Argentina.
Alma Carr	United Kingdom	The barque was driven ashore on Miquelon.
Anna Christina	Sweden	The ship was wrecked near Lindesnes, Norway before 23 October. She was on a voyage from Malmö to Bergen, Norway.
Annie E. Sherwood	United Kingdom	The ship was wrecked at Santa Anna.
Annie Simpson	United Kingdom	The ship was driven ashore at Halifax, Nova Scotia, Canada.
Ava	United Kingdom	The brigantine was wrecked on the Longsand, in the North Sea off the coast of Essex.
Augusta	Sweden	The ship was wrecked at Härnösand. She was on a voyage from Ullånger to Rio de Janeiro, Brazil.
Belle	United Kingdom	The schooner was driven ashore at "Saltave", Nova Scotia.
Bien	France	The ship was driven ashore at the Pointe de la Coubre, Charente-Inférieure.
Bravo	Sweden.	The ship ran aground She was on a voyage from Karlshamn to Stockholm. She was refloated and assisted in to Kalmar.
Carmine	Italy	The brig was driven ashore and wrecked near Tenedos, Ottoman Empire. She was on a voyage from Antwerp, Belgium to Taganrog, Russia.
Catherine	New South Wales	The barque was wrecked at Newcastle.
Chimera	United Kingdom	The ship was driven ashore at "Nordland". she was on a voyage from Dublin to Antwerp. She was refloated with assistance.
Comorin	United Kingdom	The steamship was driven ashore on the Île de Ré, Finistère, France with the loss of a crew member. She was on a voyage from the Clyde to Bordeaux. She was refloated on 28 October and subsequently taken in to the Charente.
Condor	Germany	The schooner was wrecked on the Noord Banjaard Sand, in the North Sea off the Dutch coast. Her crew were rescued. She was on a voyage from Danzig to Dordrecht, South Holland, Netherlands.
Conquest	United States	The ship ran aground on the Nantucket Shoals. She was on a voyage from Stockholm, Sweden to Boston, Massachusetts.
Corsica	United Kingdom	The ship was driven ashore on the Bic Reef. She was on a voyage from Newcastle upon Tyne, Northumberland to Montreal, Quebec, Canada. She was refloated and taken in to Quebec City, where she arrived on 23 October.
Cymbeline	France	The ship was driven ashore on the Île de Planier, Bouches-du-Rhône. She was on a voyage from Singapore, Straits Settlements to Marseille, Bouches-du-Rhône. She was refloated and taken in to Marseille.
Cynthia	United Kingdom	The full-rigged ship was wrecked on Anticosti Island. Her crew survived.
Daniel	France	The brig was abandoned at sea.
Danube	France	The ship was abandoned in the Atlantic Ocean. She was on a voyage from New York, United States to Queenstown, County Cork, United Kingdom.
Defiance	United Kingdom	The ship was wrecked on the coast of the Colony of Natal. She was on a voyage from Bombay to Liverpool, Lancashire.
Delta	United Kingdom	The ship was driven ashore at Gravelines, Nord, France. She was refloated on 12 October and towed in to Calais, France.
Dovenby	United Kingdom	The ship ran aground at Portland, Maine. She was on a voyage from Portland to Cork.
Edith Mary	Germany	The ship ran aground on "Mellosa". She was on a voyage from Hamburg to Pori, Grand Duchy of Finland.
Edward	United Kingdom	The ship put in to Lisbon, Portugal on fire. She was on a voyage from Cardiff to Havana, Cuba.
England	United Kingdom	The ship was abandoned at sea in a waterlogged condition. She was on a voyage from Quebec City to Liverpool.
Eros	United Kingdom	The steamship was driven ashore in Long Island Sound. She was on a voyage from Cardiff to New York. She was refloated and completed her voyage.
Esperancia	Portugal	The ship was abandoned at sea. Her crew were rescued by Mondelli (France).
Estrella	United Kingdom	The barque ran aground and was wrecked at the mouth of the Brass River, Africa with the loss of a crew member. She was on a voyage from Liverpool to Africa.
Fanny Forbes	United Kingdom	The barque was driven ashore at Halifax.
Formose	France	The ship ran aground at Port-des-Barques, Charente-Inférieure. She was on a voyage from Bordeaux to New Orleans, Louisiana, United States. She was refloated and taken in to Rochefort, Charente-Inférieure.
Glommen	Sweden	The ship was wrecked on the coast of Mecklenburgh, Germany with the loss of two of her crew.
Gode	Flag unknown	The sealer was lost off the coast of Iceland.
Gretchen	Germany	The ship sank between Sifnos and "Simalos", Greece. Her crew survived. She was on a voyage from the Danube to an English port.
Haabet	Denmark	The koff sprang a leak and was abandoned in the Baltic Sea south of Stockholm, Sweden. Her crew were rescued.
Helen	United Kingdom	The ship was lost whilst on a voyage from Hong Kong to Fuzhou, China.
Helene	Germany	The schooner ran aground at the mouth of the Mucury River. She was on a voyage from Bahia, Brazil to the Mucury River.
Helensbank	United Kingdom	The ship was abandoned in the Atlantic Ocean. She was on a voyage from Liverpool to Quebec City.
Historia	United Kingdom	The barque was abandoned in the Atlantic Ocean (44°40′N 12°20′W) before 24 October. Her crew were rescued by the barque Paul Eliza (France).
Hoek van Holland	Netherlands	The ship ran aground between 14 and 23 October. She was on a voyage from "Pasaroesang" to Cheribon, Netherlands East Indies.
Homer	United Kingdom	The barque was driven ashore in the Penghu Islands, China with the loss of all but one of her crew. She was on a voyage from Shanghai to Shantou, China.
Iser	United Kingdom	The barque was abandoned in the Atlantic Ocean. Her crew were rescued by Theresa (Norway). Iser was on a voyage from Maceió, Brazil to Liverpool. She came ashore in the Inishkea Islands, County Mayo in late December and broke up.
Isgled	Russia	The brig was wrecked at Pylos, Kingdom of Greece. She was on a voyage from Taganrog to Malta.
Janus	Norway	The ship ran aground at Sonderhagen, Denmark. She was refloated and taken in to Aalborg, Denmark.
Jenny Moodie	United Kingdom	The ship foundered. She was on a voyage from Troon, Ayrshire to Sackville, New Brunswick, Canada.
Jeune Melanie	France	The lugger was wrecked at Brest, Finistère before 12 October.
J. M. H.	United Kingdom	The schooner was driven ashore west of Cemlyn, Anglesey. She was on a voyage from Newport, Monmouthshire to Liverpool. She was refloated on 12 October.
Johanna	Germany	The ship ran aground at Ålsgårde, Denmark. She was on a voyage from Sunderland, County Durham, United Kingdom to Stettin. She was refloated and taken in tow.
Johanna Margaretha	Netherlands	The ship was driven ashore at Hamra, Gotland, Sweden. She was on a voyage from Saint Petersburg, Russia to Harlingen, Friesland.
Kitty	United Kingdom	The smack was driven ashore at "Rosdoham", County Kerry.
Kristina	Norway	The brig was abandoned in the North Sea. Her crew were rescued by the steamship Jupiter (Flag unknown).
Lady Maxwell	United Kingdom	The ship was driven ashore at Sainte-Anne-des-Monts, Quebec.
Linda Abbot	Canada	The ship was wrecked at Port Medway, Nova Scotia.
Lion Belge	(United Kingdom of Great Britain and Ireland) Gibraltar	The tug struck rocks and sprang a leak whilst assisting in efforts to refloat Thistle (United Kingdom) and was beached near Tarifa, Spain. She was refloated on 18 October and taken in to Gibraltar.
Lone Star	Queensland	The brig was wrecked at Rockhampton.
Louise	United Kingdom	The sloop was lost near "Saganitz".
Lucknow	United Kingdom	The ship ran aground on the Kaloot Bank. She was on a voyage from Bassein, India to Antwerp. She was refloated and taken in to Antwerp.
Luzon	United States	The steamship was wrecked near Cape Valera, French Indo-China on or after 21 October.
Magnolia	United Kingdom	The ship was driven ashore at Grand-Métis, Quebec. She was on a voyage from Bristol, Gloucestershire to Quebec City.
Manning	United Kingdom	The brig was driven ashore and wrecked at Bellewstown, County Meath. Her crew were rescued.
Margaret Jane	United Kingdom	The ship ran aground. She was on a voyage from Wick, Caithness to Emden, Germany. She was refloated and taken in to Dunbar, Lothian.
Margaret Jane	New South Wales	The schooner was wrecked in the Richmond River.
Maria Luigia M	Italy	The ship was driven ashore at Cuxhaven, Germany.
Maria Reid	United Kingdom	The ship was driven ashore near "Knachagen", Sweden. She was on a voyage from Peterhead, Aberdeenshire to Stettin. She was refloated on 27 October.
Martin	Germany	The ship was abandoned in the North Sea. Her crew were rescued. She was on a voyage from Alloa, Clackmannanshire, United Kingdom to Danzig.
Mary Lucretia	United States	The barque was driven ashore and wrecked at Palermo, Sicily, Italy.
Matilda	Germany	The brig was abandoned at sea. Her crew were rescued by Liverpool (United Kingdom). Matilda was on a voyage from Liverpool to Danzig.
Moss	Flag unknown	The ship ran aground on the Morup Reef, in the Baltic Sea. She was on a voyage from a Baltic port to the Nieuwdiep. She was refloated and resumed her voyage.
Niphon	Japan	The ship was driven ashore near Yokohama. She was refloated.
Omonia	Flag unknown	The ship was wrecked. She was on a voyage from Trieste to the Danube.
Otago	United Kingdom	The ship was driven ashore in Sandy Bay. Her crew survived. She was on a voyage from Greenock, Renfrewshire to Quebec City. She was destroyed by fire in late November.
Pausilippo	United Kingdom	The schooner was driven ashore on the Isle of Man. Her crew were rescued by a lifeboat.
Perseverance	United Kingdom	The ship was wrecked at Santa Anna. Her crew were rescued.
Porto la Plano	Flag unknown	The ship was lost at Spitzbergen, Norway.
Princess	United Kingdom	The schooner was driven ashore near Queenstown. She was refloated.
Ragna	Canada	The ship was lost whilst on a voyage from Halifax to New York.
Rantipole	United Kingdom	The schooner was driven ashore in the Pescadores with the loss of all but one of her crew.
Regina	United Kingdom	The ship was wrecked on Galveston Island, Texas, United States. She was on a voyage from Newport to Galveston, Texas.
Ricardo	Canada	The ship was wrecked on the Geio Harbour Ledges.
Rifleman	New Zealand	The 81-ton schooner left Lyttelton, New Zealand for Havelock on 10 October, and was last seen fighting a gale near Cape Campbell. No trace of the ship or her six crew was ever found.
Rowena	United Kingdom	The ship was driven ashore at "Smolen". Her crew were rescued. She was on a voyage from Arkhangelsk, Russia to Grimsby, Lincolnshire. She was consequently condemned.
Saghalien	United Kingdom	The barque was driven ashore and wrecked 12 nautical miles (22 km) north west of Dénia, Spain. Her crew were rescued. She was on a voyage from La Spezia, Italy to Almería, Spain.
Sarah	New South Wales	The schooner was wrecked in the Richmond River.
Sir Rober Sale	United Kingdom	The ship ran aground at Calcutta. She was on a voyage from Calcutta to Australia. She was refloated the next day and resumed her voyage.
Skiddaw	United Kingdom	The ship was driven ashore on Anholt, Denmark. She was on a voyage from Kronstadt to London.
Sleipner	Flag unknown	The ship was wrecked on Novaya Zemlya, Russia.
Sophia Johanna	Germany	The ship was wrecked near Libava, Courland Governorate.
St. Cast	France	The brig was wrecked on Bornholm, Denmark with the loss of her captain.
Stettin	United Kingdom	The steamship ran aground on the Lillegrund, in the Baltic Sea.
St. Galian	United Kingdom	The steamship was wrecked near Dénia, Spain. Her crew were rescued.
Strathaven	United Kingdom	The ship was driven ashore at Montreal. She was on a voyage from Montreal to Glasgow, Renfrewshire.
Sunbeam	United Kingdom	The ship was driven ashore on Ossabaw Island, Georgia, United States. She was on a voyage from London to Savannah, Georgia.
Tagal	France	The ship was driven ashore on Öland, Sweden. She was on a voyage from a French port to Sundsvall, Sweden. She was refloated.
Teologos	Flag unknown	The ship was wrecked. She was on a voyage from Trieste to Sulina, Ottoman Empire.
Thistle	United Kingdom	The brigantine was driven ashore near Tarifa. She was on a voyage from Ancona, Italy to London.
Thomas	United Kingdom	The ship was destroyed by fire. She was on a voyage from Hamburg, Germany to Saint John's, Newfoundland Colony.
Tippoo Saib	Canada	The ship was driven ashore and wrecked at Pensacola, Florida, United States before 2 October. She was on a voyage from Pensacola to Liverpool.
Trois Frères	France	The ship was wrecked on Utlängan, Sweden. She was on a voyage from Karlshamn to Slitohamn, Sweden. She was later refloated and taken in to Karlshamn, Sweden.
Valborg	Sweden	The ship was wrecked at Bretignolles-sur-Mer, Vendée, France with the loss of all hands before 7 October.
Venskabet	Flag unknown	The ship was lost at Spitzbergen.
Vica	Germany	The ship sank off Cape Kinkenaes, Iceland. Her crew were rescued.
Victor	Denmark	The ship collided with Rurik (Imperial Russian Navy) and foundered off "Tolbuchin", Russia with the loss of two of her crew.
Vincenzo A.	Italy	The ship ran aground near Cape Sestos, Ottoman Empire. She was on a voyage from Sulina, Ottoman Empire to Falmouth, Cornwall, United Kingdom.
Vittoria	Greece	The brig was driven ashore at Mangalia, Ottoman Empire before 15 October.
Walborg	United Kingdom	The schooner was driven ashore on Saaremaa, Russia. She was on a voyage from Amsterdam, North Holland to Vyborg, Grand Duchy of Finland.
Wild Rover	United States	The medium clipper was driven ashore on Long Island, New York State. She was on a voyage from Iquique, Chile to New York City. She was a total loss.
Widar	United Kingdom	The ship was lost near Jaffa, Ottoman Syria.
Yaale	Sweden	The ship ran aground on the Goodwin Sands, Kent, United Kingdom. She was on a voyage from Neder Kalix to Genoa, Italy. She was refloated and resumed her voyage, but put in to Plymouth, Devon, United Kingdom on 10 October.
719	Russia	The lighter was run into and sank at Kronstadt.
