= Île-aux-Ruaux =

Coordinates: 47°00′47″N 70°44′13″W

Île-aux-Ruaux (Ile aux Réaux, Ile des Ruaux, Île au Ruau, and others) is one of the oldest concessions in the history of New France. The whole island was granted to the Jesuits in 1638 by the Company of One Hundred Associates. The Jesuits took possession in 1639. Among these first arrivals was François Byssot de la Rivière.

The island lies in the Saint Lawrence River and is within easy access of Quebec City and Île d'Orléans. It is approximately 3.5 miles by .75 miles in size and is part of the Archipelago of Isle-aux-Grues. It is also a part of the municipality of Saint-François-de-l'Île-d'Orléans, in L'Île-d'Orléans Regional County Municipality.

Île Reaux is now a private hunting island, home to a half-century-old estate, “Le Club de Chasse aux Brigands”.

In 1962 the island was purchased by William O’Brien, a Montreal businessman, who had different plans. Being an avid and experienced hunter, he was well aware of flight paths of game birds. Just north of the island on the shore of the St. Lawrence River, is Cap Tourmente, amongst the largest concentration of Snow Geese in the world. Many were confused why a Montreal Stock Broker would want a farm on the St. Laurence. William was not as puzzled.

Thus began “Club de Chasse aux Brigands”

It has hosted family, friends, Royalty, Heads of State, Fortune 500 executives and many more.
