= Thury-Harcourt-le-Hom =

- Commune
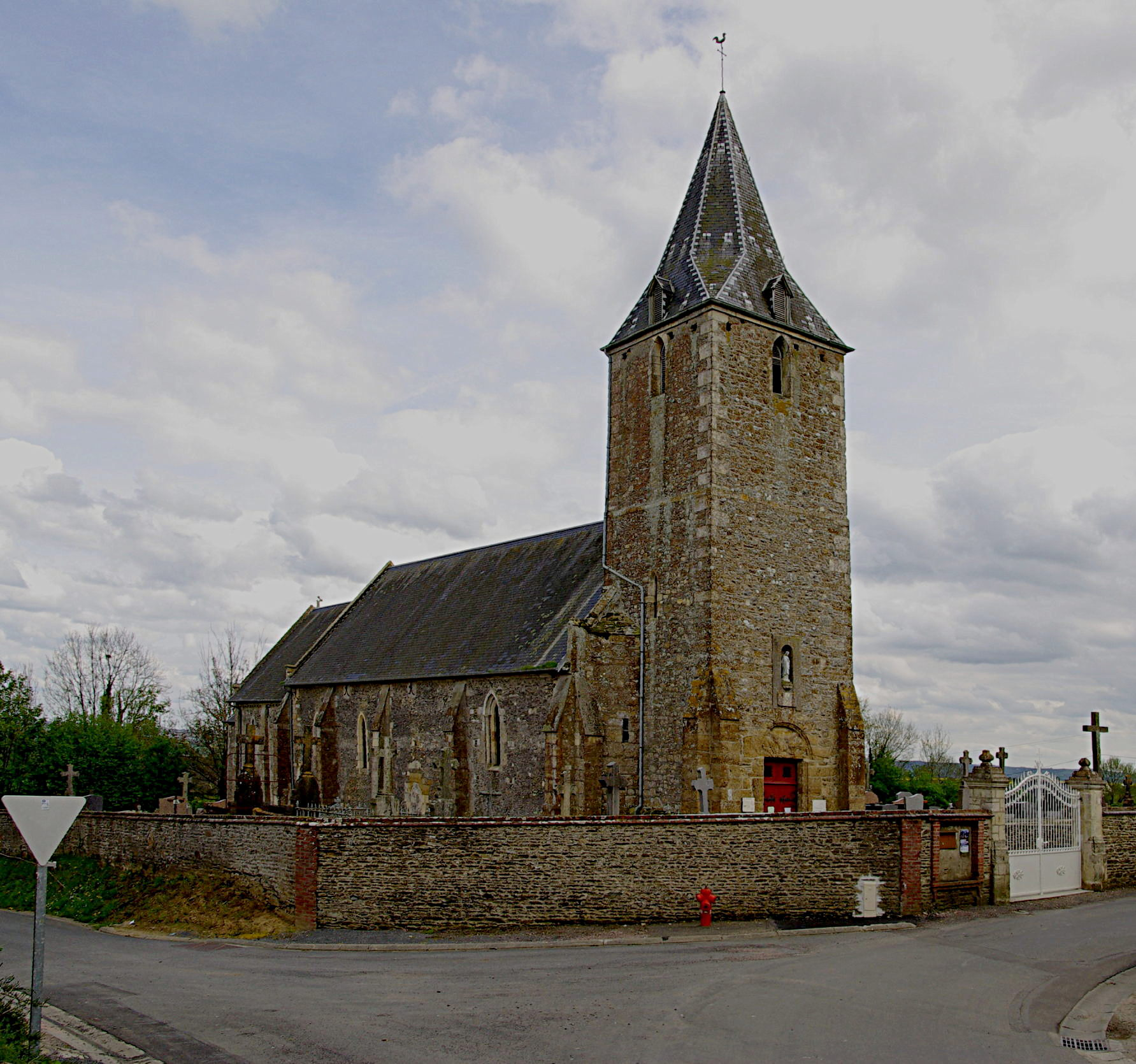
- The church in Curcy-sur-Orne
- Location of Thury-Harcourt-le-Hom
- Location within France Location within Normandy
- Coordinates: 48°59′10″N 0°28′44″W
- Country: France
- Region: Normandy
- Department: Calvados
- Arrondissement: Caen
- Canton: Le Hom
- Intercommunality: Cingal-Suisse Normande

Government
  - Mayor (2020–2026): Philippe Lagalle
- Area^{1}: 46.93 km^{2} (18.12 sq mi)
- Population (2023): 3,600
  - Density: 77/km^{2} (200/sq mi)
- Time zone: UTC+01:00 (CET)
  - Summer (DST): UTC+02:00 (CEST)
- INSEE/Postal code: 14689 /14220
- ^{1} French Land Register data, which excludes lakes, ponds, glaciers > 1 km^{2} (0.386 sq mi or 247 acres) and river estuaries.

Thury-Harcourt-le-Hom (French pronunciation: [tyʁi aʁkuʁ lə ɔm]; known as Le Hom before 2022) is a commune in the department of Calvados, northwestern France. The municipality was established on 1 January 2016 by merger of the former communes of Thury-Harcourt (the seat), Caumont-sur-Orne, Curcy-sur-Orne, Hamars and Saint-Martin-de-Sallen.

Le Hom officially changed its name to Thury-Harcourt-le-Hom on 1 January 2022.

== Geography ==
The commune is part of the area known as Suisse Normande.

The commune is made up of the following collection of villages and hamlets, La Hoguette, Le Val, Cropton, Martinbeau, Curcy-sur-Orne, La Bestrie, Le Quesnay, La Métairie, Le Poirier, Hamars, Saint-Silly, Paugeais, Thury-Harcourt, Les Trois Mariés, Saint-Bénin, La Fosse, Le Maizeray and Montfort.

The rivers Orne and Ajon are the two rivers flowing through the commune. In addition the commune has twelve streams flowing through its bnorders, La Vallee des Vaux, The Neumer, The Aunay Douffieres, La Hoguette, La Maladrerie, La Vallee du Puceux, The Pisseux, The Val de Cropton, The Val Quebert, The Herbion, The Traspy and La Vignonniere.

== Population ==
Population data refer to the commune in its geography as of January 2025.

Historical population
Year	Pop.	±% p.a.
1968	2,332	—
1975	2,396	+0.39%
1982	2,776	+2.13%
1990	2,999	+0.97%
1999	3,128	+0.47%
2007	3,333	+0.80%
2012	3,638	+1.77%
2017	3,689	+0.28%
2023	3,600	−0.41%
Source: INSEE

== Points of Interest ==
=== National heritage sites ===
The Commune has two buildings and areas listed as a Monument historique

Église Saint-Sauveur de Thury-Harcourt is a church built during the 12th to 14th century and was classed as a Monument historique in 1929.

Château d'Harcourt is the remains of a seventeenth century chateau that was classed as a monument in 1927. The castle was set on fire on 12 August 1944 by the 2nd SS Panzer Division Das Reich when the British 59th (Staffordshire) Infantry Division reached the outskirts of Thury-Harcourt.

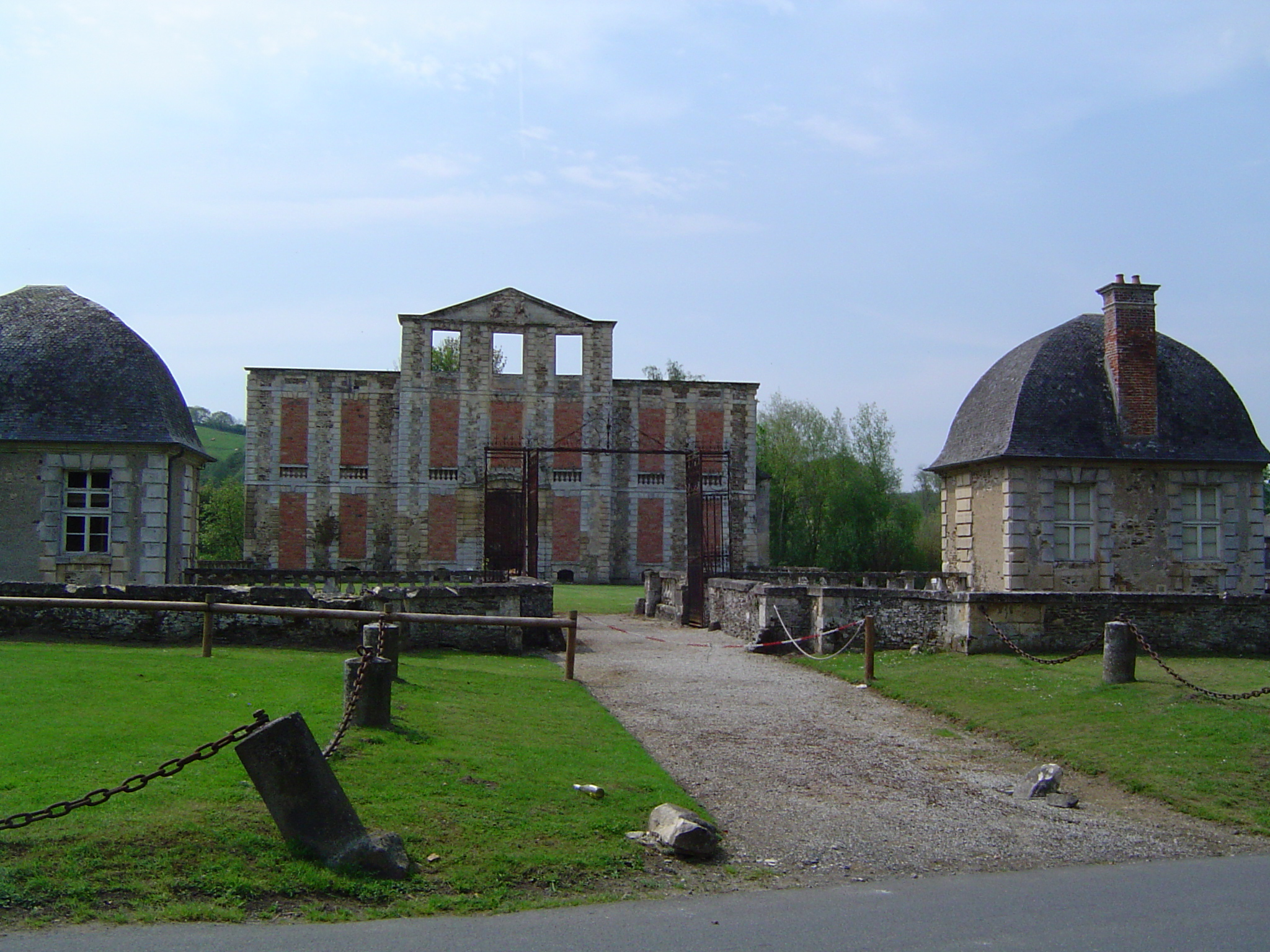
Chateau de Thury-Harcourt

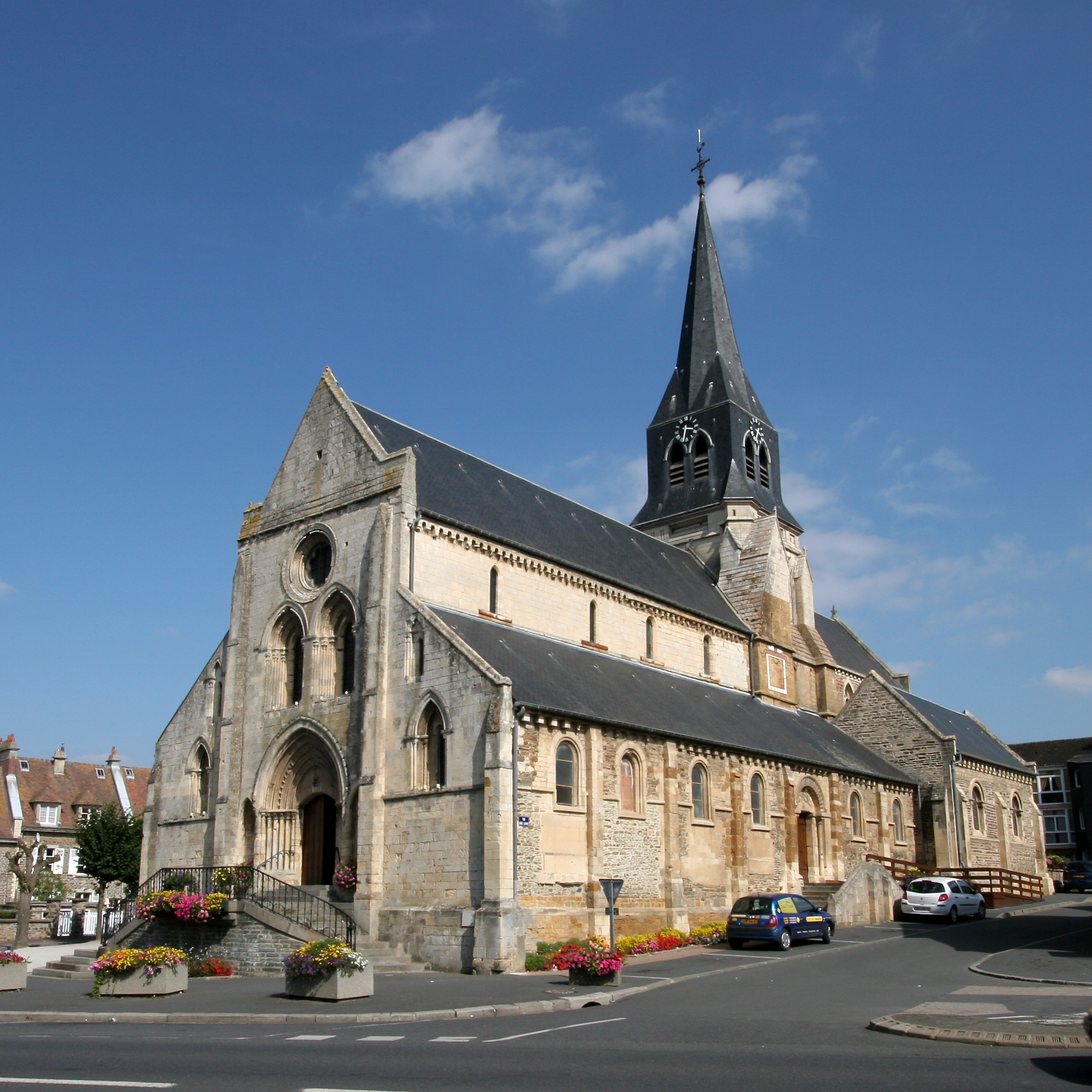
Thury-Harcourt Saint-Sauveur Church

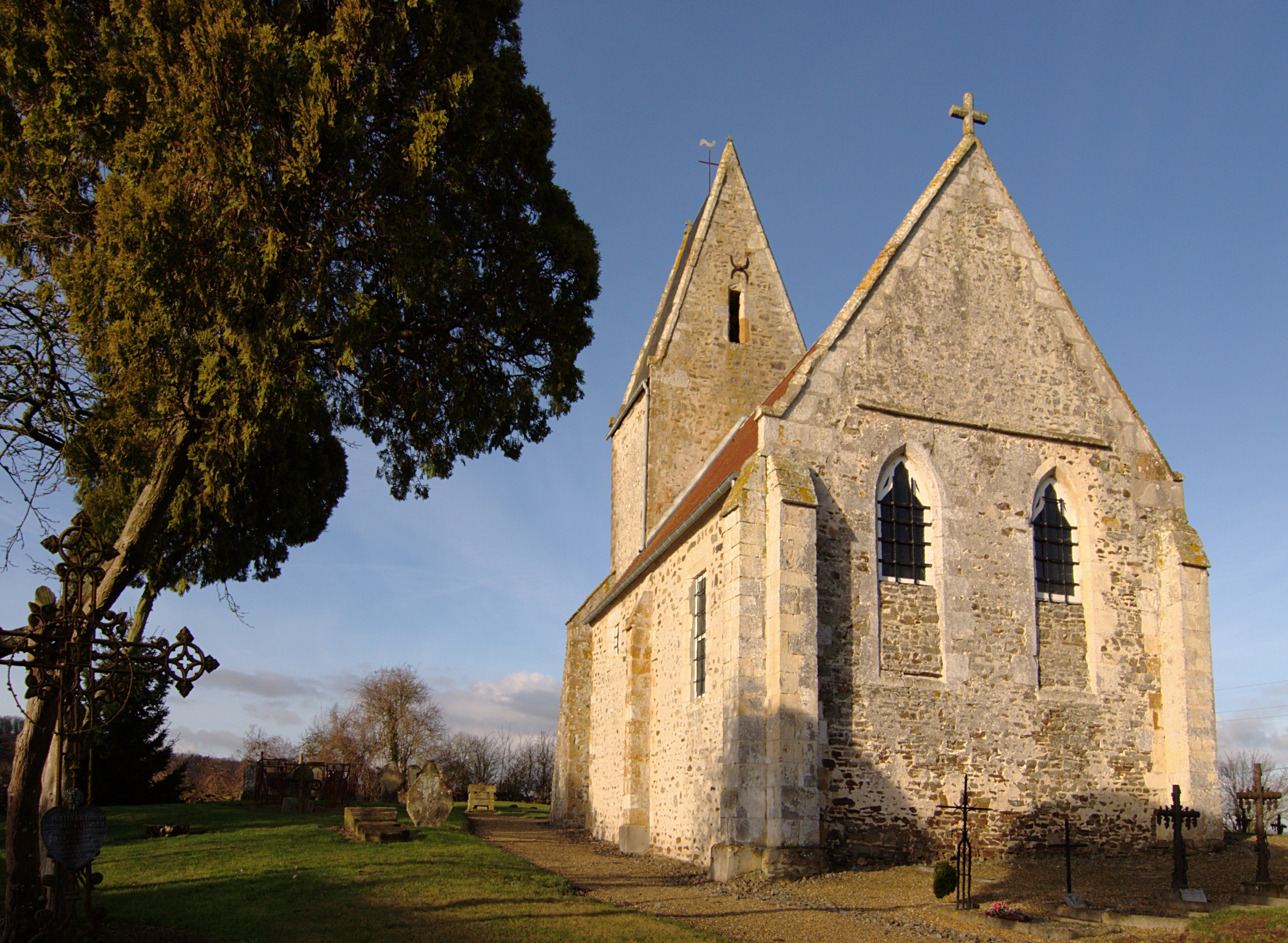
Thury-Harcourt Saint Benin church

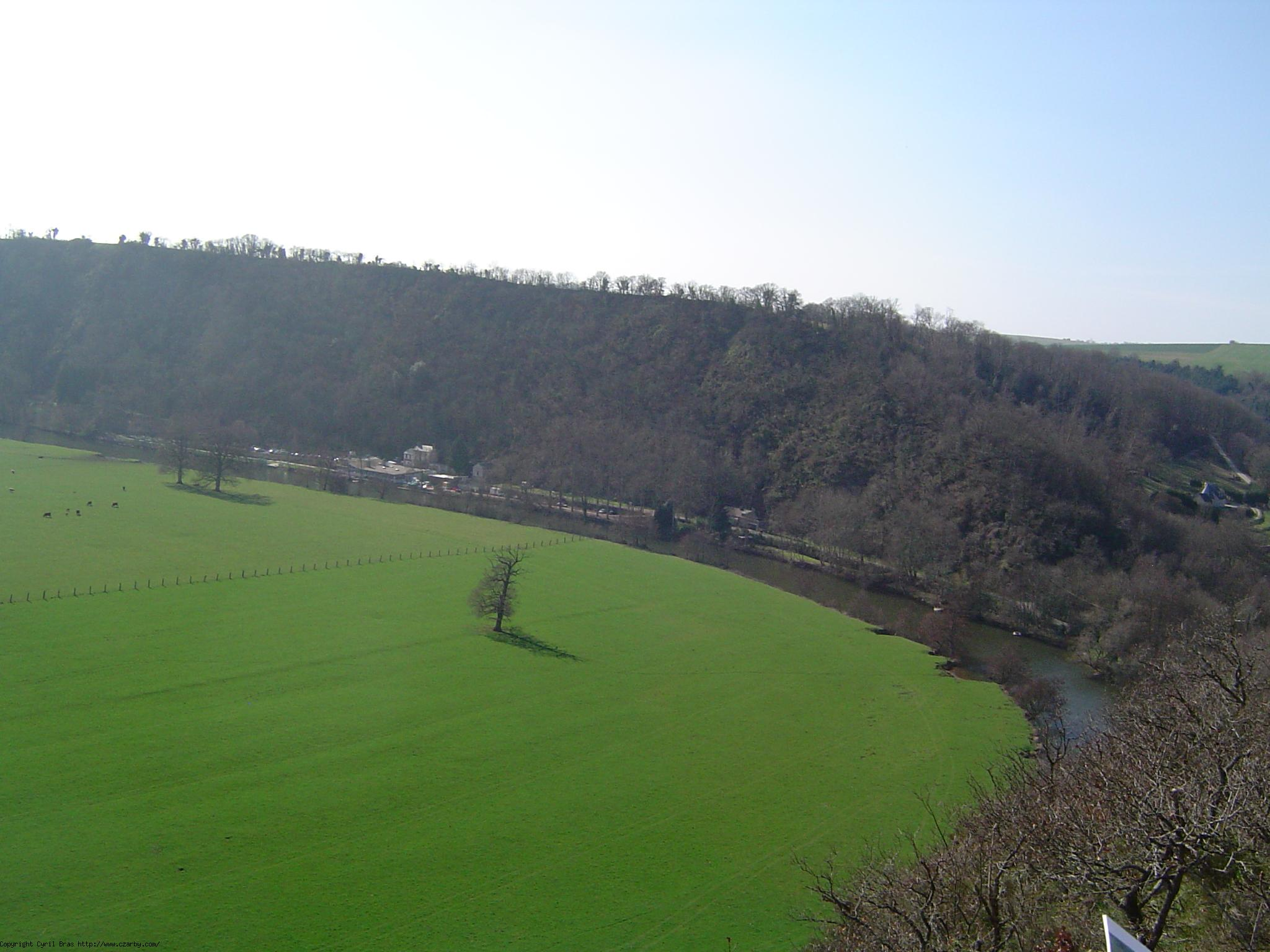
The Orne River at Thury Harcourt

== Notable people ==
- Pierre Gringore -(1470 or1475 – 1538) a popular French poet and playwright was born here.
- Pierre Legardeur de Repentigny (1600 – 1648) a military person and seigneur in New France, was born here.
- Charles Legardeur de Tilly (1616 – 10 November 1695) a merchant, fur trader, seigneur and official in New France, was born here.
- Jean-Baptiste Legardeur de Repentigny (1632-1709) an esquire, midshipman, and councillor in the Conseil, was born here.
- Paul Héroult (1863 – 1914) a French scientist, was born here.

== Sport ==
Thury-Harcourt-le-Hom has a swimming pool the 'Aqua Sud, which has been open since 1992. The pool, features both indoor and outdoor areas as well as sauna, steam room areas.

== Twin towns – sister cities ==
Thury-Harcourt-le-Hom is twinned with:

- Seaton, United Kingdom since 1982
- Heimbuchenthal, Germany since 1981

== See also ==
- Communes of the Calvados department
