= Company of Habitants =

The Company of Habitants (French: Compagnie des Habitants [kɔ̃paɲi dez‿abitɑ̃] or the Communauté des Habitants [kɔmynote -]) was a fur-trading company chartered in 1645 in the French Colony of Canada to succeed the Company of One Hundred Associates.

== History ==
The Colony of New France was officially settled during the reign of Henry IV in 1608 when Samuel de Champlain founded Quebec, and in the following years it came under the control of several fur trading companies, eventually consolidating control under the newly founded Company of One Hundred Associates in 1627, which was made up of investors back in France, who would be charged with supplying ships and provisions to transport a certain number of colonists to settle in the territory every year, as well as covering all administrative costs for the colony, and in return were granted a monopoly on virtually the entire fur trade in Canada. For a number of different reasons the quota of new settlers coming from France was continually not being met, and the population of New France fell far behind that of the rival English colonies in North America, as well as the early Dutch colony of New Netherland.

The small group of businessmen and nobles in the young colony led by Pierre Legardeur and Jean-Paul Godefroy, came up with the idea to take over the mandate of overseeing the settlement of Canada from the Company of One Hundred Associates, whose investors were far removed across the ocean back in France, and in return profit on the monopoly of the fur trade themselves in the colony. They managed to convince the Crown of their plan and were granted a charter to that effect in 1645. Initially the company was overseen and owned by a small number of notable merchants, businessmen, and nobles in the colony, who would cover the costs of shipping 20 colonists to Canada a year, as well as all administrative expenses of the colony, and an additional 1,000 livres worth of beaver pelts in rent on top of all expenses.

Not long after this, following the protests of several rival and disgruntled Canadian lords and businessmen back in France (which in fact included fellow founder and director Robert Giffard- see section below), the royal authorities in Paris became wary of such large revenues from the North American fur trade being managed and profited on in a far away, sparsely settled territory by such a small group of individuals, and citing "extravagances" by the twelve original owners and directors, took back control of the company just two years later in 1647, and replaced the board of directors with a regulatory council, made up of the Governor and several other officials to act solely as an arbitrary body for oversight, with the company shares and the entire fur trade with it soon after being opened up to the general public. Matters worsened when the fur trade and subsequently the company went into sharp decline following the French-allied Hurons being pushed further west in a war with their Iroquois enemies in 1652.

Consumed by debt, the company shares were consolidated and slowly but steadily sold off in the following years to the Company of Rouen in France, with the control of the fur trade and responsibility of colonization shifting back to the Company of One Hundred Associates, and both companies would finally be dissolved in 1663 by King Louis XIV, who then transferred the rights of investment in the fur trade to the French West India Company, and took the colony under direct control of the Crown and made it a province of France, substantially increasing the settlement and development of Canada in the following years.

=== Personnel ===
The company was founded and initially managed (and virtually entirely owned) by a board of twelve directors that included:

- Jean Bourdon- Royal Surveyor and engineer
- François de Chavigny- seigneur and lieutenant to Governor de Montmagny
- Guillaume Couillard- seigneur and businessman
- Mathurin Gagnon- merchant and store owner
- Robert Giffard- seigneur and master-surgeon
- Jean-Paul Godefroy- Native American interpreter and businessman
- Jean Godefroy de Lintot- seigneur and fur merchant
- Jean Guyon- seigneur and master mason
- Noël Juchereau des Chastelets- businessman and legal councillor
- Pierre Legardeur de Repentigny- noble, seigneur, and admiral of shipping for New France
- Jacques Leneuf de la Poterie- noble, seigneur, businessman, and Governor of Trois-Rivières
- Michel Leneuf du Hérisson- noble, seigneur, businessman, and later Lieutenant-General of Trois-Rivières

Two years after its formation a regulatory council replaced the owners and directors, which was composed of the Governor of New France, the Governor of Montréal, the Superior of the Jesuits in Canada, and they were assisted by the syndics, or locally elected legal representatives, of the three major towns of Québec, Trois-Rivières, and Montréal.

== See also ==
- Company of One Hundred Associates
- Colony of Canada
- List of French colonial trading companies
- List of chartered companies
