= Charles Joseph d'Ailleboust des Muceaux =

Canadian politician

Charles Joseph d'Ailleboust des Muceaux (between 1623 and 1626 – November 20, 1700) was a soldier, merchant and judge in New France. He served as acting governor of Montreal from 1651 to 1653. He was a member of the Communauté des Habitants and of the Société Notre-Dame de Montréal.

The son of Nicolas d'Ailleboust de La Madeleine et de Coulonges and Dorothée de Manthet, he was born in France and came to Canada with his uncle Louis d'Ailleboust, the newly appointed governor, in August 1648. In 1652, he married Catherine, the daughter of Pierre Legardeur de Repentigny. He was lieutenant of the Montreal garrison in 1663. Des Muceaux served as the civil and criminal judge of Montreal from 1666 to 1677. He died at Montreal in 1700.
