= Pierre Legardeur de Repentigny =

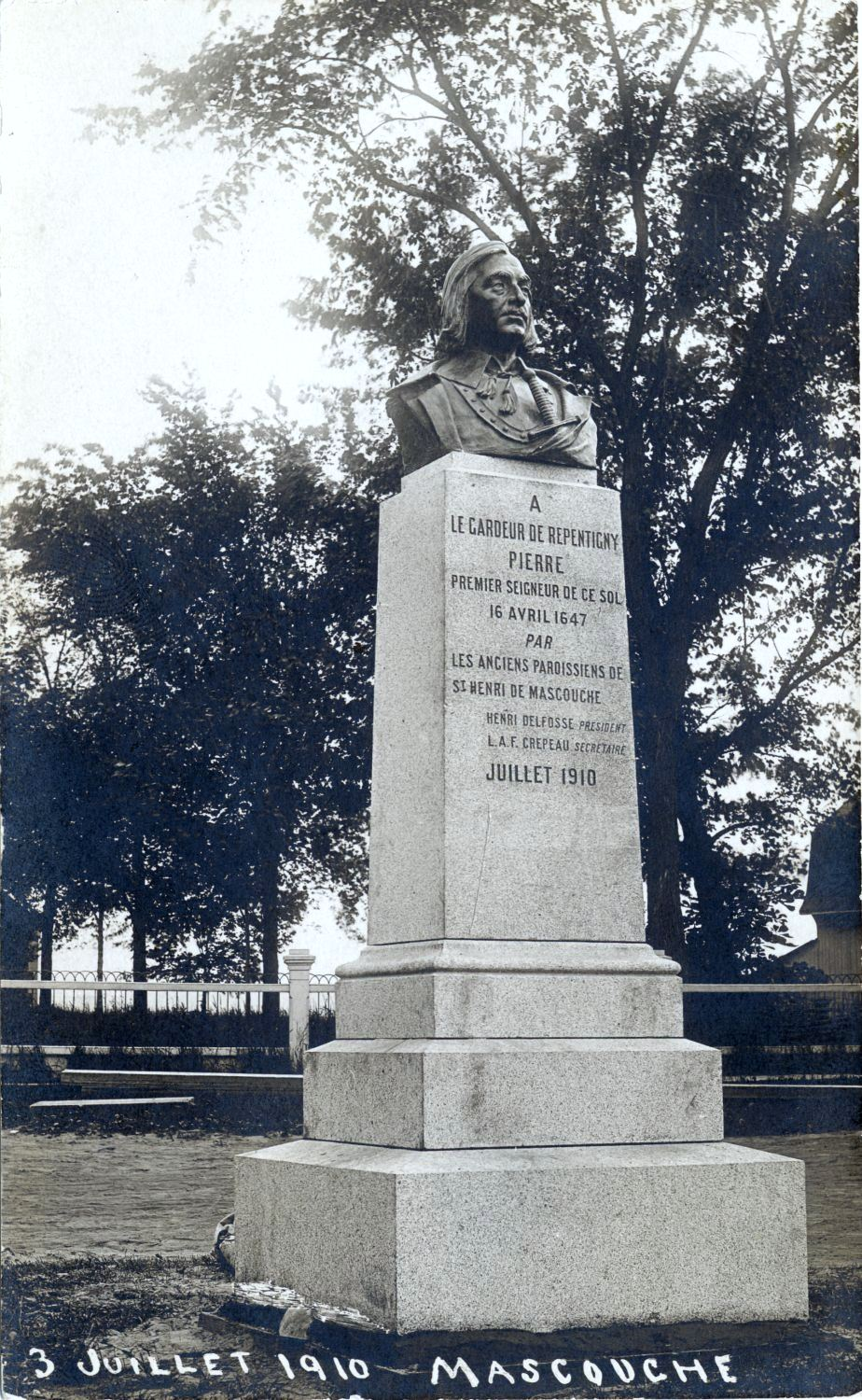
- Commemorative plaque
- Born: c. 1600; Thury-Harcourt-le-Hom
- Died: 1648; Atlantic Ocean
- Occupations: Governor and Admiral
- Spouse: Marie Favery
- Children: Marie-Madeleine, and Jean-Baptiste Legardeur de Repentigny
- Relatives: Charles Legardeur de Tilly - Brother

Pierre Legardeur de Repentigny (French pronunciation: [pjɛʁ ləɡaʁdœʁ də ʁəpɑ̃tiɲi]; c. 1600 – 1648) was a military person and seigneur in New France. He served as Governor Huault de Montmagny's lieutenant, as a director of the Communauté des habitants, and as admiral of the fleet for shipping in New France.

The son of René Legardeur de Tilly and Catherine de Cordé, he was born at Thury-Harcourt in France and came to Quebec City in June 1636, arriving with his mother, his sister Marguerite, the wife of Jacques Leneuf de La Poterie, and his brother Charles Legardeur de Tilly. Legardeur helped found the Communauté des Habitants, who took over the fur trade monopoly from the Company of One Hundred Associates. In 1647, he obtained the seigneuries of Repentigny and Bécancour.

Legardeur died at sea during a return trip to Canada from France in spring 1648 after an epidemic broke out on his ship.

He had married Marie Favery. His daughter Marie-Madeleine married Jean-Paul Godefroy and his daughter Catherine married Charles Joseph d'Ailleboust des Muceaux.
