= Caumont-sur-Orne =

- Part of Thury-Harcourt-le-Hom
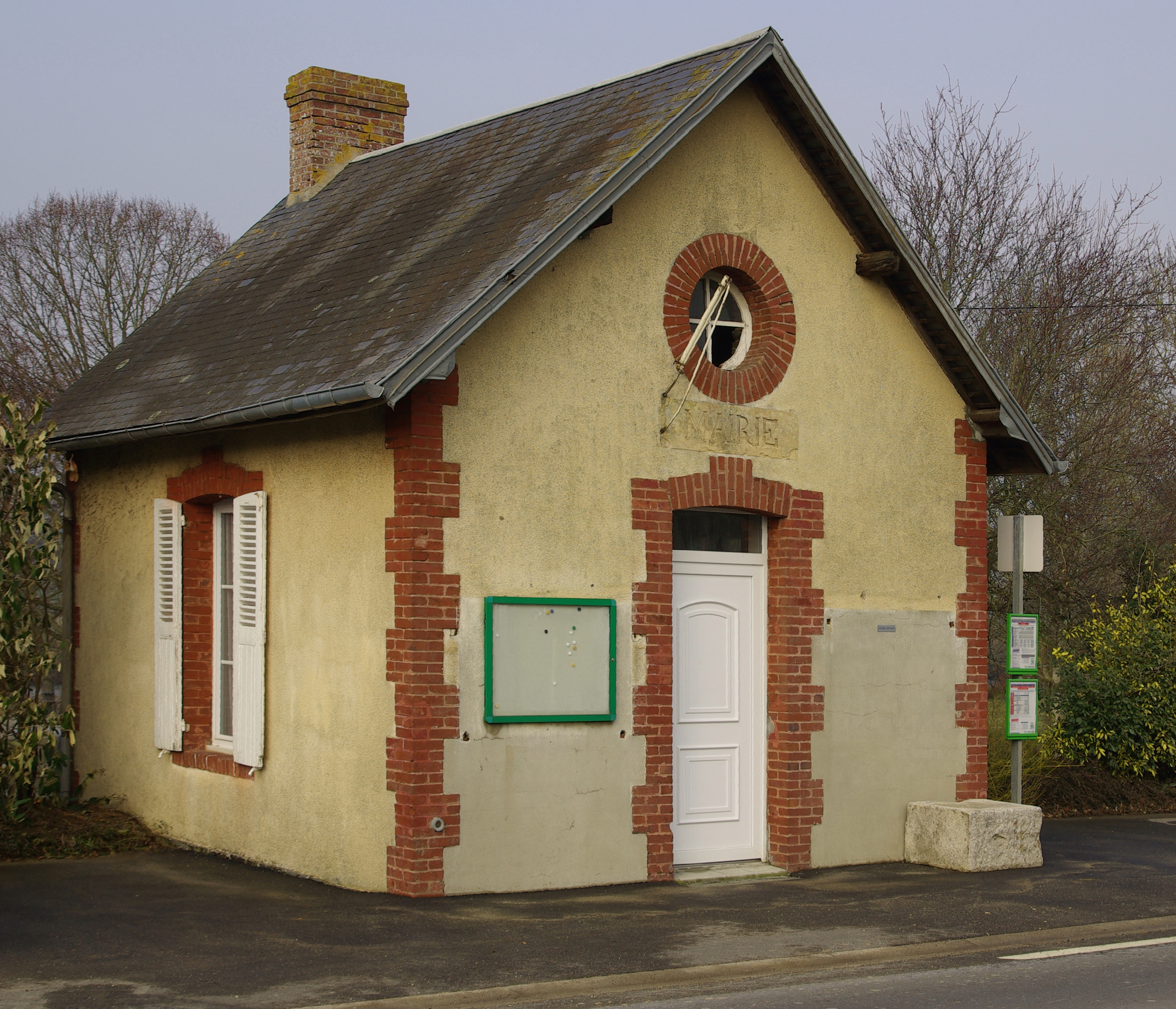
- Town hall
- Location of Caumont-sur-Orne
- Location within France Location within Normandy
- Coordinates: 48°57′27″N 0°28′44″W
- Country: France
- Region: Normandy
- Department: Calvados
- Arrondissement: Caen
- Canton: Le Hom
- Commune: Thury-Harcourt-le-Hom
- Area^{1}: 0.9 km^{2} (0.35 sq mi)
- Elevation: 50 m (160 ft)
- Highest elevation: 145 m (476 ft)
- Lowest elevation: 26 m (85 ft)
- Population (2023): 74
  - Density: 82/km^{2} (210/sq mi)
- Time zone: UTC+01:00 (CET)
  - Summer (DST): UTC+02:00 (CEST)
- Postal code: 14220
- ^{1} French Land Register data, which excludes lakes, ponds, glaciers > 1 km^{2} (0.386 sq mi or 247 acres) and river estuaries.

Caumont-sur-Orne (French pronunciation: [komɔ̃ syʁ ɔʁn], literally Caumont on Orne) is a former commune in the Calvados department in the Normandy region in northwestern France. On 1 January 2016, it was merged into the new commune of Thury-Harcourt-le-Hom.

The former commune is part of the area known as Suisse Normande.

== See also ==
- Communes of the Calvados department
