= Fox Wars =

Series of two conflicts between the Indigenous Meskwaki people and the French Empire

Date	1712–1733
Location	Great Lakes region

Belligerents
Meskwaki	Kingdom of France

The Fox Wars were two conflicts between the French and the Meskwaki (historically Fox) people who lived in the Great Lakes region (particularly near Fort Pontchartrain du Détroit) from 1712 to 1733. (Note: In their book The Fox Wars, Edmunds and Peyser discuss the difficulties in nomenclature, saying, "They referred to themselves as Mesquakies, as do the modern Mesquakie people near Tama, Iowa. In the late seventeenth and early eighteenth centuries, however, other Algonquian tribes of the western Great Lakes region and upper Mississippi Valley frequently called them Outagami, using a Chippewa word meaning 'People of the Opposite Shore.' In contrast, the French almost always referred to the Mesquakies as Renards, or 'Foxes.' Almost 90 percent of the anthropological and historical references to the tribe also use the term Fox…since most anthropologists and historians use the term Fox, as do most library reference systems, we finally decided generally to use Fox when discussing our subject." "Preface" in Edmunds, R. David and Joseph L. Peyser, The Fox Wars: The Mesquakie Challenge to New France (University of Oklahoma Press: Norman, 1993), xviii.) These territories are known today as the states of Michigan and Wisconsin in the United States. The Wars exemplified colonial warfare in the transitional space of New France, occurring within the complex system of alliances and enmities with native peoples and colonial plans for expansion.

The Meskwaki controlled the Fox River system in eastern Wisconsin. This river was vital for the fur trade between French Canada and the North American interior, because it allowed river travel from Green Bay in Lake Michigan to the Mississippi River. The French wanted the rights to use the river system to gain access to both the Mississippi and trade contacts with tribes to the west.

The wars claimed thousands of lives and initiated a slave trade whereby Meskwaki were captured by native allies of New France and then sold as slaves to the French colonial population. Indeed, alliances between the French and other native groups (such as the Odawa, Miami and Sioux) as well as those between the Meskwaki and other native groups (such as the Sauk, Mascouten and Kickapoo) were an important aspect of the Wars, influencing every stage of the conflicts, including the causes, the fighting and the conclusion.

The First Fox War (1712–1716) began with inter-alliance violence and ended with the surrender of a large group of Meskwaki and the subsequent peace deal. As was custom, peace offerings required the exchange of goods and of prisoners to account for those who died in the conflict, acknowledging the importance of this exchange for establishing peace. The Second Fox War (1728–1733) was far more destructive than the first, and ended with the near annihilation of the Meskwaki population.

== Prior to the Fox Wars ==
The Meskwaki were living in eastern Wisconsin at the time of their first contacts with the French around 1670. The Meskwaki unsuccessfully sought to establish themselves as middlemen between the French and the Sioux, one of their two traditional enemies, the other being the Ojibwe in northern Wisconsin.

Not only were the Meskwaki unsuccessful, but prior to 1701, many wars between indigenous people, which also included the French, against the Iroquois were ravaging the indigenous lands under the Pays d'en Haut. The Beaver Wars brought fear and urgency for the French to attempt to save what was left of their trade alliances. Their alliances were in jeopardy, and also, in 1697 the western posts were closed as a result of the termination by Louis XIV of the fur trade west of Montreal. Historian Richard White illustrates central Wisconsin at the end of the seventeenth century as "a vast refugee center, its situation constantly changing, nations socializing, cooperating, feuding, fighting, constantly adjusting their strategies to shift in French trading policy, which was always the dominant reality." Thus, when the Peace Conference of 1701 finally took place in Montreal, the French were quick to establish a protectorate in the Great Lakes region. Nevertheless, the question still remained as to how they would facilitate trade with their southern partners, when their main trading posts had been closed. From this point on, the Great Lakes region was going to be even more unstable.

== First Fox War ==
First Fox War
Date	1712–1716
Location	Near the Fort of Detroit
Result	Meskwaki defeat: Peace deal; Surrender and enslavement of a large group of Meskwaki; Slave trade of Meskwaki

Belligerents
Meskwaki	France and its indigenous allies

Commanders and leaders
Lamyma; Pemoussa	Jacques-Charles Renaud Dubuisson; Saguima; Makisabé

Strength
Unspecified number of Meskwaki warriors outnumbering the French soldiers and allied warriors	Unspecified number of French soldiers and allied warriors; 600 Odawa and Potawatomi warriors as reinforcements

Casualties and losses
1,000 Meskwaki and Mascouten men, women and children killed	30 Frenchmen and 60 allies killed

After the Peace Conference of 1701, Antoine de Lamothe Cadillac resolved the trade issue by establishing a new fort, Fort Pontchartrain du Détroit. This location was strategic, as it allowed access to the water trade routes, which were more accessible than Montreal, and the warpaths of the Great Lakes region. Despite enabling access to this region by establishing a fort, the French could not survive without the help of the indigenous people. Governor Cadillac invited numerous tribes to settle in the area. Odawa and Huron people established villages in the area, soon joined by the Potawatomi, Miami, and Ojibwe. The population may have reached 6,000 at times. This was positive for the French, but their presence and the presence of the Meskwaki would aggravate things in the region.

Indigenous groups that were enemies lived fairly far apart, but in Detroit, they lived side by side competing for a concrete and practical relationship with the French. As French colonizers sought to enlarge their influence in the West, they sought to ally themselves with the natives as commercial and military partners. At the time, French imperial policy had already privileged certain indigenous tribes, in particular the Ojibwe-Odawa-Potawatomi confederacy and the Illini in the south, and the Sioux were the next profitable alliance. The Wisconsin tribes (Meskwaki, Sauk, Mascouten, Kickapoo and Ho-Chunk), with the intention of dominating the post, prevented the French from having direct trade access to the Sioux. Concurrently, they would disrupt the lives of the Odawa and Miami near Detroit, as well as the French settlement.

In the spring of 1712, a large group of Meskwaki under Lamyma, a peace chief, and Pemoussa, a war chief, established villages in the area, including a fort with easy gunshot range of Portchartrain. The Meskwaki outnumbered the French and Hurons. However, their luck changed with the arrival of 600 allied warriors under Ottawa war chief Saguima and Potawatomi chief Makisabé which reversed the fighting situation. Jacques-Charles Renaud Dubuisson, who wanted the Meskwaki removed from their village, had ordered these reinforcements. For nineteen days, the Meskwaki fought and kept their footing with the French. After several days, the Meskwaki asked for a ceasefire and returned some hostages; however, no ceasefire was granted. Several days later, another parley occurred, as the Meskwaki tried to seek protection for the women and children. Dubuisson chose to let his allies decide their course; they chose to grant no mercy. After nineteen days, during a nighttime thunderstorm, the Meskwaki escaped their village and fled north. The French-allied natives cornered them near the head of the Detroit River and inflicted four more days of fighting.

By the end of the siege and pursuit, around 1,000 Meskwaki and Mascouten men, women and children were killed (including many of the captives). The French lost 30 men, and their allies had 60 fatalities. It was not until 1726, with the arrival of Charles de Beauharnois de La Boische, that the Meskwaki and French actually achieve peace. In the past, there had been several attempts to find peace, however, each one failing and causing the Meskwaki to return to war. As a result, during this period, enslaved Meskwaki (men, women and children) entered Canada through raids and became a dominant source of enslaved labour in the Saint Lawrence Valley.

== Second Fox War ==
Second Fox War
Date	1728–1733
Location	Near Fort Pontchartrain du Détroit
Result	Meskwaki defeat: Near annihilation of the Meskwaki population

Belligerents
Meskwaki	France; Huron; Illinois Confederation; Odawa; Ojibwe

Commanders and leaders
Meskwaki commanders	Jacques-Charles Renaud Dubuisson and allied commanders

Strength
Unspecified number of Meskwaki warriors	Unspecified number of French soldiers and allied warriors

Casualties and losses
Nearly the entire total population	Unknown

For the Meskwaki, the start and the potential end to their conflict lay in the slave trade. The Meskwaki were still willing to return to the French alliance if they could secure the return of their captives. In fact, all they wanted was to be considered as allies and kin, not enemies. However, the French officials supported the Illini, Odawa, Ojibwe, and Huron, who were against the Meskwaki. As a result, the peace treaty from 1726 was annulled in the summer of 1727.

With this peace treaty being annulled, the Meskwaki declared war on the French and all their native allies. For the next four years, the French invested a lot of money and, with their allies, descended on Meskwaki villages with an extreme advantage. The French pursued destruction of the Meskwaki to such an extent as to damage their relations with other tribes. The Sioux and the Iowa refused to grant the Meskwaki sanctuary. By the summer of 1730, the Meskwaki population was weakening and continued to be attacked until the Sauk finally granted them sanctuary. The Sauk and Meskwaki fought off the French with the help of western Indians, who were aware of Beauharnois' plan for decimation. This final push would cause Beauharnois to grant a "General Pardon" in 1738 and for peace to be restored.

Their historical feuds with New France encouraged many Sauk and Meskwaki warriors to develop kinship ties with France's rivals, the British. These ties continued to be significant as late as the War of 1812, when many Sauk and Meskwaki fought on the side of British North America.

== French finances ==
The financial situation of the colony before the first Meskwaki War was a state of semi-bankruptcy. The War of Spanish Succession had taken a significant toll on the funds of France, and by extension, on the resources available to the colony of New France. Therefore, the colony had to maximize its profits and try to minimize its spending. This posed a particular problem in respect to the long-standing tensions with the Meskwaki natives and their long-standing enemies, the Cree and Assiniboine.

The financial justification for wanting to prevent war was very simple for the French. Periods of war slowed down the production of fur by the natives and New France was in no position to lose any more money that had already been spent elsewhere. This lack of funds made the French dependent on their allies for furs. Large scale expeditions could not be carried out by French voyageurs, instead the voyageurs would travel into native hunting grounds to make their trades and maintain relationships. These relationships were vital to French economic success, but this also bound them to act as diplomatic partners, becoming embroiled in conflicts between Native groups as part of their trade agreements.

== Slavery and the Fox Wars ==
The Fox Wars facilitated the entry of Meskwaki slaves into colonial New France in two ways: as spoils of French military officers or through direct trading. Beginning with the 1716 treaty, slavery became an ongoing element of the Meskwaki-French relationship. As historian Brett Rushforth explains,

The French received scores of Meskwaki slaves during the previous four years, placing themselves in a difficult diplomatic position between their allies and the Meskwaki. By accepting these slaves, French colonists had symbolically acknowledged their enmity against the Meskwaki, implicitly committing military support to their allies in future disputes.

Meskwaki slavery in New France thus had a precarious symbolic power. On the one hand, the exchange of slaves signaled the possible end of conflict, while, on the other hand, it also served as a motive for inciting more conflict. In an early French manuscript describing the history of Green Bay, it is suggested that to gain peace with the Meskwaki, it is more beneficial for opposing groups to simply return Meskwaki captives than to take up arms against the Meskwaki. "If this amnesty for slaves is not reached, and if the Fox do not maintain their promises for peace and "take up the hatchet anew, it will be necessary to reduce them by armed forces of both colonies acting in concert." Slaves were so commonly held that "every recorded complaint made by the Fox against the French and their native allies centered on the return of Fox captives, the most significant issue perpetuating the Fox Wars into subsequent decades."

Yet, long after the conflicts, Meskwaki slaves worked in domestic service, unskilled labour and fieldwork, among other tasks throughout New France. Despite the abolishment of slavery in New France in accordance with the 1709 ordinance, Meskwaki slavery was widespread. This pattern of slavery is evidence that intercultural experience in New France was sometimes vicious.

== Tensions and economic allies ==
After the First Fox War, roughly 1,000 Meskwaki slaves were taken by the coalition of Native groups who were fighting the Meskwaki (namely the Illini). In addition, some were taken and sold to the French in Detroit and in return, they received goods and credit. The impact of these slave holdings tied into the tensions surrounding the Second Fox War. This demonstrated a distinct lack of control by the French over the trade that they depended upon in the early years of New France.

After the First Fox War, there were tensions between the Meskwaki and the French in Detroit, for holding slaves. Always wanting to secure French trade agreements, the Governor General of Canada, General Philippe de Rigaud de Vaudreuil, agreed to return the Meskwaki slaves in his possession. This agreement relied on certain conditions. The first request was that the Meskwaki return their slaves to other Native groups. The second request was that new slaves be brought to the French in the following year. The French desire for slaves would lead the Meskwaki into conducting more slave raids, and increasing tension between Native groups.

The Illini would persist during this period in denying their holding of any Meskwaki slaves, but the French were impotent to force the Illini to return the slaves in their possession. This in turn caused tensions to boil over and spark the Second Fox War. By the end of the Second Fox War, France had lost a trading partner, and a certain amount of economic influence. Another aspect that was made apparent through these tensions was the lack of control over the trade that New France had found itself to be reliant on. This lack of control stemmed from the political nature of the slave trade and the adeptness at which Illini natives had used it to anger the Meskwaki and lock the French into alliances. As a result, this was another event that led to the decline of the French power in Great Lakes Region.
