= Jean-Baptiste Bissot, Sieur de Vincennes =

- Born: 19 January 1668; Quebec, New France
- Died: 1719 (aged 50–51); Kekionga
- Parent(s): François Byssot de la Rivière; Marie Couillard

Signature
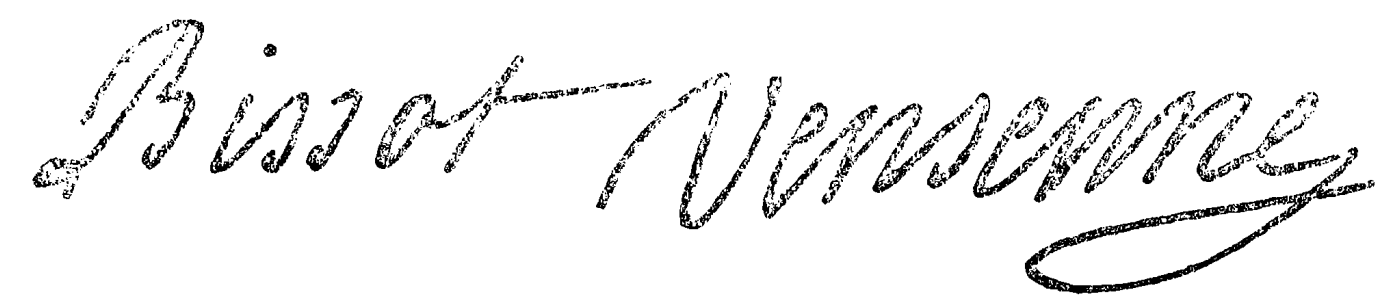

Jean-Baptiste Bissot, Sieur de Vincennes, (19 January 1668 – 1719) was a soldier and explorer from New France. He was also a friend to the Miami Nation. He spent a number of years at the end of his life as an agent of New France among the Miami.

Vincennes was born in Quebec on 19 January 1668. His father, tanner François Byssot de la Rivière, was granted a seigniory for his tannery on the St. Lawrence River in 1672. The Seigniory of Vincennes was bordered by Lauzon and Beaumont. Later, Bissot became a ward of his brother-in-law, Louis Joliet, who entered him in the seminary at Quebec.

Vincennes married Marguerite Forestier in Montreal in 1696. They had four daughters and three sons, including François-Marie.

Through the efforts of his godfather, Jean-Baptiste Talon, he secured a commission as ensign in the French marine. In 1696, the Comte de Frontenac appointed him as commander of the French outposts southeast of Lake Michigan (in present-day northeastern Indiana). Here he became good friends with the Miami people, and settled at the St. Joseph River. He returned to Montreal in 1700 with an Iowa slave, whom he had baptised as Jean-René.

In 1704, Vincennes established a trading post and fort at Kekionga, the location of present-day Fort Wayne, Indiana. The same year, the current governor-general of New France, Philippe de Rigaud de Vaudreuil, wrote the French court to emphasize the importance of Bissot's services to New France among the Miami people.

In 1712, Vincennes served as second in command at Fort Detroit. In this position, he resided with the Miami to keep them from falling under the control of the British. He helped defeat the forces of the Fox Nation and acquired a young Fox slave, whom he named François-Michel. This slave eventually was owned by his son, François-Marie Bissot.

He died in 1719 at Kekionga and was succeeded by his son as commander of the French in Miami country. After his death, a permanent garrison was established in the Maumee River area by Jacques-Charles Renaud Dubuisson.
