= Jean-Paul Le Gardeur =

- Born: 4 October 1661; Ville-Marie
- Died: 1738
- Occupation(s): explorer and lieutenant
- Children: 5
- Parent: Jean-Baptiste Legardeur de Repentigny & Marguerite Nicolet

Jean-Paul Le Gardeur, sieur de Repentigny, was born in Ville-Marie on October 4, 1661, and died in 1738, was an explorer and lieutenant for New France, at the service of the King of the Kingdom of France. He was referred to as Saint-Pierre or Sieur de Saint-Pierre.

== Biography ==
=== Origines ===
Jean-Paul Le Gardeur was born at Ville-Marie on October 4, 1661, son of Jean-Baptiste Legardeur de Repentigny (1632-1709) and Marguerite Nicolet de Belleborne (1642-1721), daughter of Jean Nicolet, sieur de Belleborne.

=== Military career ===
He entered into the French Marines in Canada, and became lieutenant in 1690. He then took the title of sieur de Saint-Pierre. In a military report dated in 1701, and written by Hector de Callières, he affirms that Le Gardeur was given the title of lieutenant in 1689, and that he continued to serve with distinction.

=== Family and descendants ===
On September 15, 1692, he married in Repentigny with Marie-Joseph Le Neuf de La Vallière. From this union were born five children:

- Marguerite Le Gardeur de Repentigny (1693), married to Henri Hiché
- Agathe Le Gardeur de Repentigny (1696-1729), married in (1727) to Charles Nolan
- Antoinette-Gertrude Le Gardeur de Repentigny (1698-1734)
- Marie-Anne Le Gardeur de Repentigny (1699-1742)
- Jacques Legardeur de Saint-Pierre (1701-1755)
