= Saint-Martin-de-Sallen =

- Part of Thury-Harcourt-le-Hom
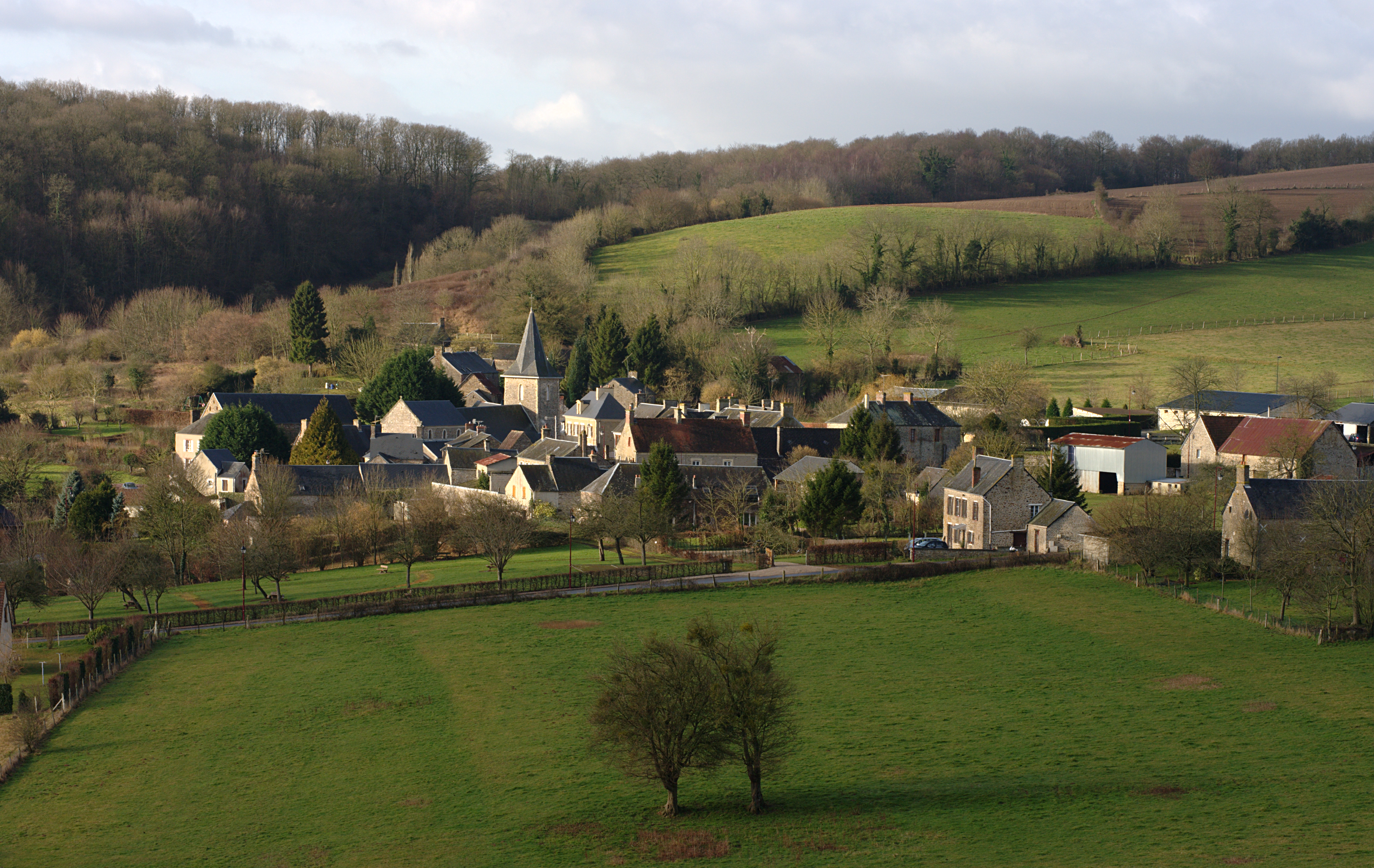
- Location of Saint-Martin-de-Sallen
- Location within France Location within Normandy
- Coordinates: 48°58′04″N 0°31′15″W
- Country: France
- Region: Normandy
- Department: Calvados
- Arrondissement: Caen
- Canton: Le Hom
- Commune: Thury-Harcourt-le-Hom
- Area^{1}: 18.1 km^{2} (7.0 sq mi)
- Elevation: 220 m (720 ft)
- Highest elevation: 285 m (935 ft)
- Lowest elevation: 22 m (72 ft)
- Population (2023): 608
  - Density: 33.6/km^{2} (87.0/sq mi)
- Time zone: UTC+01:00 (CET)
  - Summer (DST): UTC+02:00 (CEST)
- Postal code: 14220
- ^{1} French Land Register data, which excludes lakes, ponds, glaciers > 1 km^{2} (0.386 sq mi or 247 acres) and river estuaries.

Saint-Martin-de-Sallen (French pronunciation: [sɛ̃ maʁtɛ̃ də salɑ̃]) is a former commune in the Calvados department in the Normandy region in northwestern France. On 1 January 2016, it was merged into the new commune of Thury-Harcourt-le-Hom.

The former commune is part of the area known as Suisse Normande.

== See also ==
- Communes of the Calvados department
