= Curcy-sur-Orne =

- Part of Thury-Harcourt-le-Hom
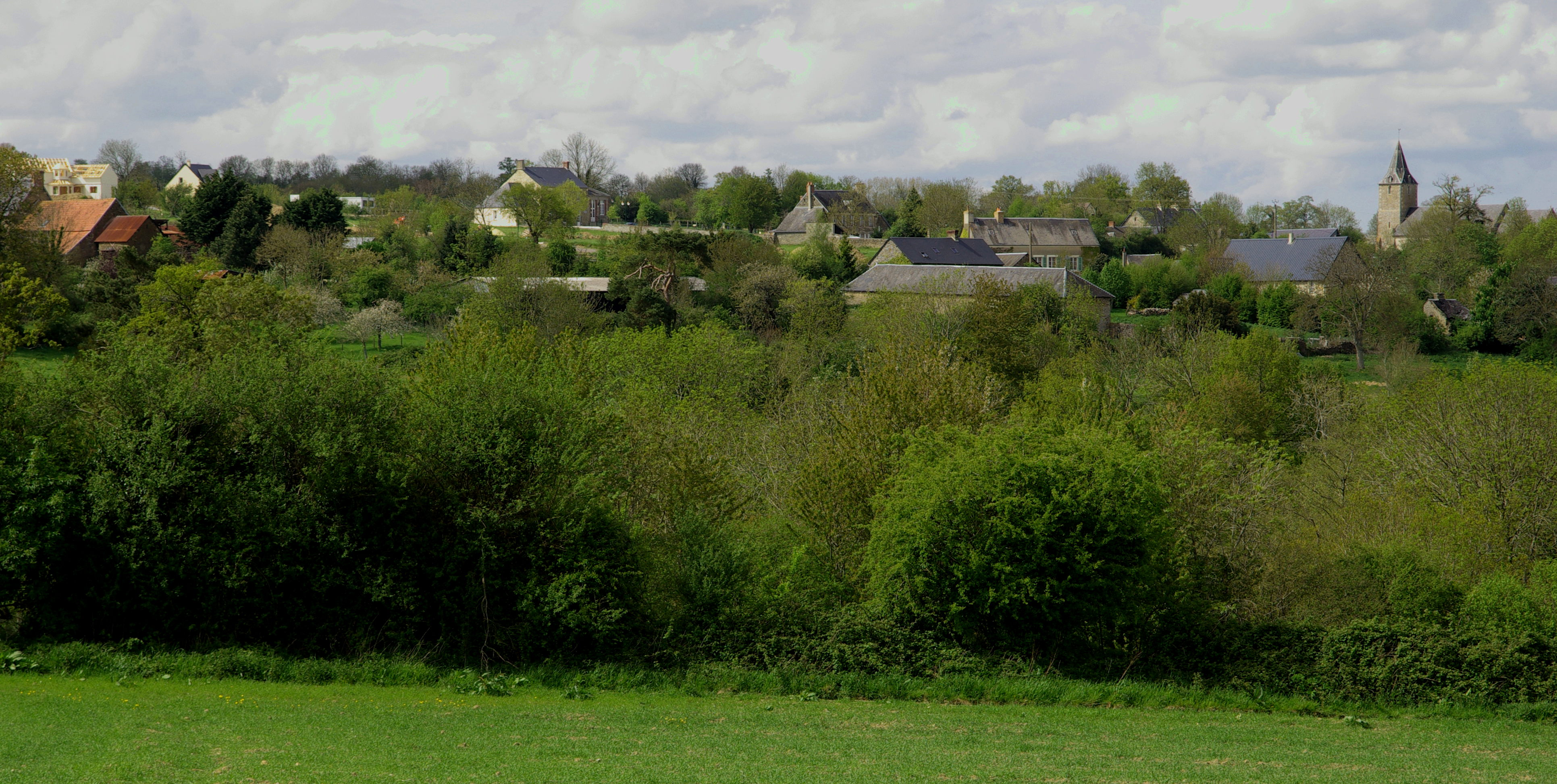

- Coat of arms
- Location of Curcy-sur-Orne
- Location within France Location within Normandy
- Coordinates: 49°00′33″N 0°31′01″W
- Country: France
- Region: Normandy
- Department: Calvados
- Arrondissement: Caen
- Canton: Le Hom
- Commune: Thury-Harcourt-le-Hom
- Area^{1}: 13.57 km^{2} (5.24 sq mi)
- Elevation: 150 m (490 ft)
- Highest elevation: 227 m (745 ft)
- Lowest elevation: 16 m (52 ft)
- Population (2023): 463
  - Density: 34.1/km^{2} (88.4/sq mi)
- Time zone: UTC+01:00 (CET)
  - Summer (DST): UTC+02:00 (CEST)
- Postal code: 14220
- ^{1} French Land Register data, which excludes lakes, ponds, glaciers > 1 km^{2} (0.386 sq mi or 247 acres) and river estuaries.

Curcy-sur-Orne (French pronunciation: [kyʁsi syʁ ɔʁn], literally Curcy on Orne) is a former commune in the Calvados department in the Normandy region in northwestern France. On 1 January 2016, it was merged into the new commune of Thury-Harcourt-le-Hom.

The former commune is part of the area known as Suisse Normande.

== See also ==
- Communes of the Calvados department
