= François Byssot de la Rivière =

- Born: 1612 or 1613; Pont-Audemer, France
- Died: 26 July 1673; Quebec, Canada
- Parent(s): Jean Byssot Du Hommée; Marie Assour

François Byssot de la Rivière (French: [fʁɑ̃swa bisɔ də la ʁivjɛʁ]; 1612 or 1613 –1673) was an early figure in the New World, his presence being recorded at Île-aux-Ruaux in 1639 when the Jesuits took possession of the property. He married Marie Couillard in Quebec on 25 October 1648.

Byssot was active in a number of pursuits and his name is associated with some of the earliest land grants and was also a person of note in seigneurial justice. In 1661, he received, from the Compagnie des Cent-Associés, a concession in what is now Labrador. He may have constructed a post at Mingan. He constructed the first tannery and was granted some other important concessions in both fishing and harvesting seals.

He had twelve children, two of whom, Jean-Baptiste and François-Joseph, attained some notability in Canadian history.
