= Jacques-Charles Renaud Dubuisson =

French soldier (1666–1739)

Jacques-Charles Renaud Dubuisson (1666–1739) was born in France and came to New France in 1685.

Renaud was a career soldier and, aside from a dueling incident, was consistently praised for his military and administrative work. His most important military work was among the Miami Indians where he was responsible for assisting with the work of Jean-Baptiste Bissot, Sieur de Vincennes in keeping the Miami from joining forces with the English. After Bissot's death in 1719, he established a number of garrison posts, one of which was commanded by François-Marie Bissot de Vinsenne.

Dubuisson was the post commander at Detroit in 1712. He commanded a post at the Miamis near Toledo from 1723 to 1727. By 1729, he was appointed post commander at Michilimackinac.
