= Company of One Hundred Associates =

French fur company in Canada (1627–1663)

- Company type: Chartered company
- Industry: Fur trade
- Founded: 1627; 399 years ago
- Defunct: 1663; 363 years ago
- Fate: Dissolved by King Louis XIV
- Headquarters: France
- Area served: New France

The Company of One Hundred Associates (French: formally the Compagnie de la Nouvelle-France, or colloquially the Compagnie des Cent-Associés or Compagnie du Canada), or Company of New France, was a French trading and colonization company chartered in 1627 to capitalize on the North American fur trade and to administer and expand French colonies there. The company was granted a monopoly to manage the fur trade in the colonies of New France, which were at that time centered on the Saint Lawrence River valley and the Gulf of Saint Lawrence. In return, the company was supposed to settle French Catholics in New France. The Company of One Hundred Associates was dissolved by King Louis XIV, who incorporated New France into a province in 1663.

== Background ==
French exploitation of North America's resources began in the 16th century when French and Basque fishermen used ports on the continent's Atlantic coastline as trading stations during the summer fishing season. Attempts at permanent settlements along the Saint Lawrence River began as early as the 1540s following the expeditions of Jacques Cartier. These early settlement attempts all failed, and it was not until 1604 that efforts at permanent settlement were renewed. These efforts were made under the terms of a trading monopoly granted by King Henry IV of France in 1603 to Pierre Dugua, Sieur de Mons, and resulted in the establishment of Port-Royal in Acadia (present-day Annapolis Royal, Nova Scotia). This attempt at colonization failed when Dugua lost his monopoly in 1607, although the site was eventually reoccupied by other colonists. In early 1608 Dugua was granted a one-year monopoly on trading and the right to establish a settlement. The expedition that year was led by Samuel de Champlain (who had also had an important role in establishing the Acadian colony), and resulted in the establishment of the colony that grew to become Quebec City.

From 1613 to 1620, the Compagnie des Marchands operated in New France but failed to fulfill their contractual obligations and therefore lost their rights in 1621 to the Compagnie de Montmorency. Six years later in 1627, Cardinal Richelieu withdrew the monopoly of the Compagnie de Montmorency, and established the Compagnie de la Nouvelle France, as part of a plan to develop trade. Throughout all of these years, the monopoly holders were frequently troubled with rogue traders (from France and other nations) in North America on one side, and politically connected opponents of their monopoly in France on the other. Many of the directors of these companies were more interested in trade than in colonization, which was usually a drain on the company's finances. Champlain, who championed the colonization efforts, worked tirelessly to make sure the French colonies survived amid political and corporate changes of power.

== Company history ==
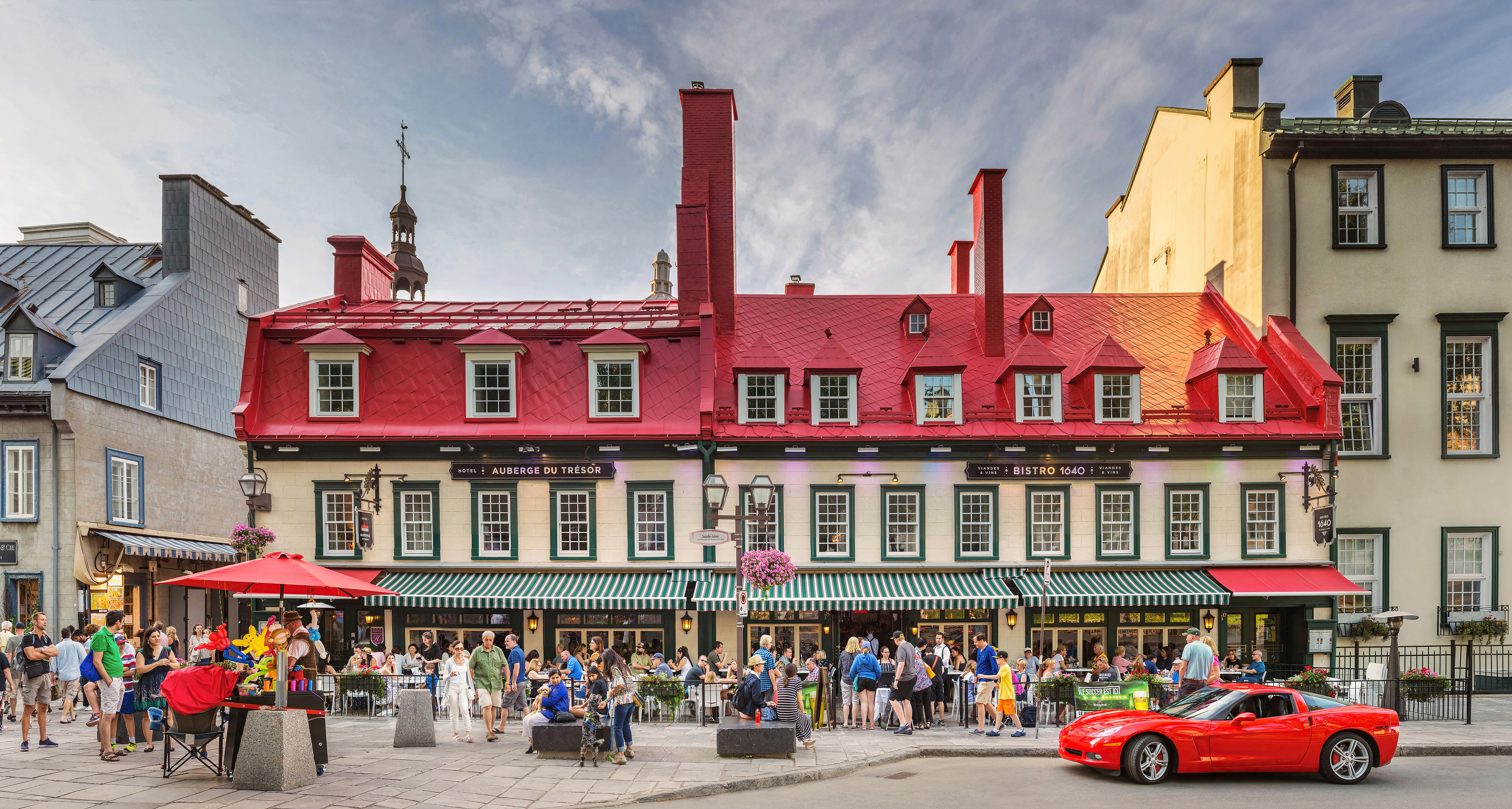
Company of One Hundred Associates house in Quebec City

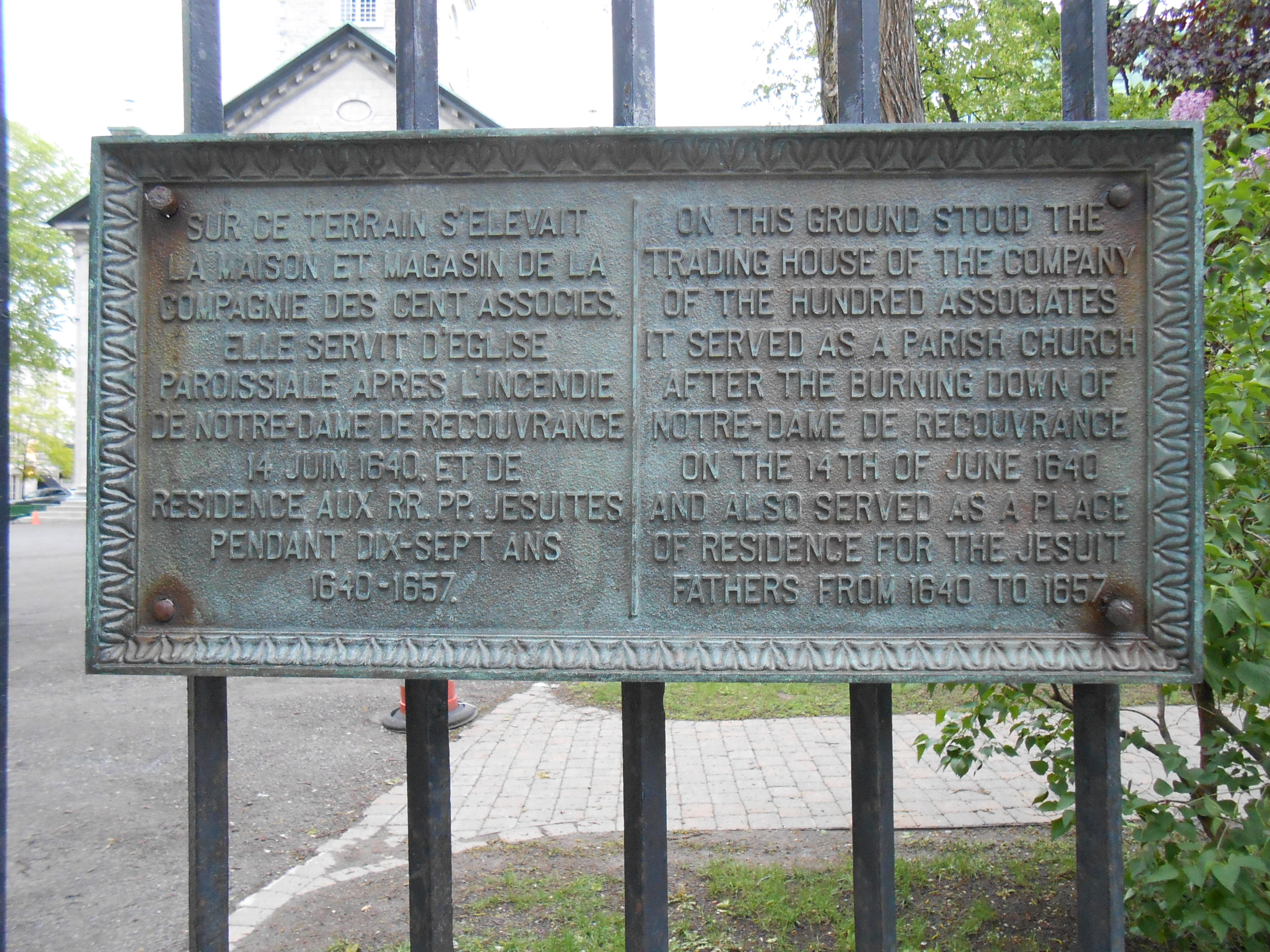
Memorial plaque in Quebec City

The Compagnie de la Nouvelle France was capitalized with 3,000 French livres from each of one hundred investors, which led to it becoming more widely known as the Compagnie des Cent-Associés (Company of One Hundred Associates in English). Its investors included many important officials of the French court as well as merchants and financiers, although most of the investors in the earlier trading companies were excluded. Champlain is listed as investor number 52 in a list published on January 14, 1628. The company was closely controlled by Richelieu and was given sweeping authority over trade and colonization in all of New France, a territory that encompassed all of Acadia, Canada, Newfoundland, and French Louisiana. Management was entrusted to twelve directors.

From 1629 to 1635 Champlain was the company's commander in New France. Under the Ancien Régime in France, every community was governed by a lord and provided with a priest plus a magistrate appointed only with the lord and priest's concurrence. The charter also required the company to bring an average of 160 settlers to New France over the next twenty-five years and to support their settlement for the first three years. It was granted a monopoly of the fur trade, and colonists not maintained by the company were free to barter with the Indians on condition they sell their furs to the company.

The company's first fleet of colonization and supply left France in April 1628 under the cloud of war, and over the objections of some of its directors. War had broken out in 1627 with England, which raised the risk of seizure of ships heading for North America. In fact, King Charles I of England had issued letters of marque authorizing the seizure of French shipping and even the taking and destruction of her colonies. David Kirke and his brothers, in possession of one of these commissions, sailed up the Saint Lawrence in heavily armed merchant ships, burned a French farm, and demanded that Champlain surrender Quebec. He refused, and the Kirkes retreated, believing Quebec to be too strongly defended. They encountered and seized the poorly defended company fleet, and took the captured goods back to England. The company lost 90% of its initial investment with the loss of the fleet.

The company encountered numerous further difficulties with its exploitation of New France including territorial battles with the English. By 1631 the company had to find new investors willing to accept the risks. In order to attract people and capital, the company had to allocate portions of its trading monopoly to new subsidiary companies. These subsidiary partners, such as the future founders of the Compagnie des Habitants in Quebec, were made up of wealthy members of the elite from various parts of France, several of them being a part of the group of newly established colonists in Canada. Nevertheless, over the ensuing two decades this concept too ran into numerous problems, and France's attention turned to Continental Europe and the ages old rivalry with the Holy Roman Empire when in 1635 it joined the Thirty Years' War in Europe.

Discontent with settlers in Quebec over the company's total control of the fur trade caused numerous problems, which led to control over the colony shifting for a time to the Canadian-based Compagnie des Habitants, and matters worsened during the 1650s when war with the Iroquois severely hampered the fur trade and threatened continued colonization.

The situation changed when King Louis XIV finally came of age, ending the long and chaotic Regency during his minority, and in 1663 one of his first major acts as a reigning monarch was to dissolve both the Company of One Hundred Associates and the Company of Habitants, shifting the fur trading rights of North America to the French West India Company, taking direct control of New France as a Province of the Realm, and subsequently deploying the Carignan-Salières Regiment to Canada in 1665 (the first European Regular unit deployed to the Western Hemisphere) to deal with the Dutch and English-backed Iroquois menace once and for all, actions which substantially increased the stability and development of the Colony of Canada in the following decades.

== See also ==
- Hudson's Bay Company
- List of French colonial trading companies
- List of chartered companies

== Bibliography ==
- Levi, Anthony (2000). Cardinal Richelieu: And the Making of France. New York: Carroll & Graf Publishers. ISBN 0-7867-0778-X.
