= List of crossings of the St. Lawrence River and the Great Lakes =

This is a list of bridges, ferries, and other crossings of the Gulf of St. Lawrence, Saint Lawrence River, and Great Lakes, by order of south shore terminal running from the Gulf of Saint Lawrence upstream to Lake Superior.

Key: Communities linked by individual crossings
(N) or (E): North- or East-shore terminal (mainland)
(I): Island served by the crossing
(S) or (W): South- or West-shore terminal (mainland)

== Crossings ==
=== Quebec ===
==== Lower and Middle Saint Lawrence ====
Crossing	Picture	Year built^{[A]}	Communities linked	Carries	Name origin	Coordinates
Qajaq W ferry			(N) Blanc-Sablon, Quebec	Connections with: Route 138; Labrador South Highway (Route 510); Great Northern Highway (Route 430)		52°25′39″N 57°8′0″W
Qajaq W ferry			(S) St. Barbe, Newfoundland and Labrador	Connections with: Route 138; Labrador South Highway (Route 510); Great Northern Highway (Route 430)		51°12′0″N 56°45′11″W
M/V Bella Desgagnés ferry (Route 138)^{[D]}			(N) Kegashka (N) La Romaine (N) Harrington Harbour (N) Tête-à-la-Baleine (N) Saint-Augustin (N) Gros-Mécatina (N) Blanc-Sablon	Route 138 (ferry system bridges a 425 km (264 mi) gap between Kegasha and Old Fort)		50°11′1″N 61°16′21″W (Kegashka); 50°13′6″N 60°40′4″W (La Romaine); 50°30′0″N 59°28′0″W (Harrington Harbour); 50°42′10″N 59°19′23″W (Tête-à-la-Baleine); 50°50′0″N 58°58′0″W (Gros-Mécatina); 51°20′20″N 58°20′30″W (Saint-Augustin); 52°25′39″N 57°8′0″W (Blanc-Sablon)
Matane-Baie Comeau-Godbout ferry			(N) Baie-Comeau (N) Godbout			49°13′56″N 68°8′4″W (Baie-Comeau); 49°19′19″N 67°35′33″W (Godbout)
Matane-Baie Comeau-Godbout ferry			(S) Matane			48°50′23″N 67°34′38″W
M/V Bella Desgagnés ferry (across the Saint Lawrence River)^{[D]}			(N) Sept-Îles (N) Havre-Saint-Pierre			50°11′47″N 66°22′38″W (Sept-Îles); 50°14′11″N 63°36′19″W (Havre Saint-Pierre)
M/V Bella Desgagnés ferry (across the Saint Lawrence River)^{[D]}			(I) Port-Menier			49°48′45″N 64°20′47″W
M/V Bella Desgagnés ferry (across the Saint Lawrence River)^{[D]}			(S) Rimouski			48°28′52″N 68°30′59″W
Rimouski-Forestville ferry			(N) Forestville			48°44′23″N 69°3′9″W
Rimouski-Forestville ferry			(S) Rimouski			48°28′52″N 68°30′59″W
Trois Pistoles-Les Escoumins ferry			(N) Les Escoumins			48°21′00″N 69°24′00″W
Trois Pistoles-Les Escoumins ferry			(S) Trois-Pistoles			48°07′00″N 69°11′00″W
Rivière-du-Loup-St-Siméon ferry			(N) Saint-Siméon	Connections with: Route 170		47°50′26″N 69°52′27″W
Rivière-du-Loup-St-Siméon ferry			(S) Rivière-du-Loup	Connections with: Route 170		47°50′45″N 69°34′19″W
Île d'Orléans Bridge^{[B]}		1935	(N) Quebec City (Beauport)	Route 368	Île d'Orléans	46°52′45″N 71°7′58″W
Île d'Orléans Bridge^{[B]}		1935	(I) Île d'Orléans	Route 368	Île d'Orléans	46°52′45″N 71°7′58″W
Quebec-Levis Ferry		1818	(N) Quebec City			46°48′42″N 71°12′5″W
Quebec-Levis Ferry		1818	(S) Lévis			46°48′37″N 71°11′17″W
Quebec Bridge^{[E]}		1917	(N) Quebec City (Sainte-Foy)	Route 175; Via Rail; Canadian National Railway; Route Verte 6	Quebec City	46°44′46″N 71°17′16″W
Quebec Bridge^{[E]}		1917	(S) Lévis (Charny)	Route 175; Via Rail; Canadian National Railway; Route Verte 6	Quebec City	46°44′46″N 71°17′16″W
Pierre Laporte Bridge		1970	(N) Quebec City (Sainte-Foy)	Autoroute 73	Pierre Laporte (1921–1970), Vice-Premier of Quebec.	46°44′42″N 71°17′25″W
Pierre Laporte Bridge		1970	(S) Lévis (Charny)	Autoroute 73	Pierre Laporte (1921–1970), Vice-Premier of Quebec.	46°44′42″N 71°17′25″W
Grondines-Lotbinière tunnel		1990	(N) Grondines			
Grondines-Lotbinière tunnel		1990	(S) Lotbinière			
Laviolette Bridge		1967	(N) Trois-Rivières	Autoroute 55	Sieur de Laviolette (real name disputed), widely acknowledged as the founder of Trois-Rivières.	46°18′23″N 72°33′36″W
Laviolette Bridge		1967	(S) Bécancour	Autoroute 55	Sieur de Laviolette (real name disputed), widely acknowledged as the founder of Trois-Rivières.	46°18′23″N 72°33′36″W
Sorel-St Ignace de Loyola Ferry			(N) Berthierville (Saint Ignace de Loyola)	Connecting between: Route 158; Route 133		46°3′34″N 73°7′33″W
Sorel-St Ignace de Loyola Ferry			(S) Sorel-Tracy	Connecting between: Route 158; Route 133		46°2′52″N 73°6′49″W

==== Island of Montreal ====
Crossing	Picture	Year built^{[A]}	Communities linked	Carries	Name origin	Coordinates
Louis Hippolyte Lafontaine Bridge-Tunnel	An entrance of the Louis Hippolyte Lafontaine tunnel, with a sign telling drivers that they are about to cross the Saint Lawrence.	1967^{[I]}	(N) Borough of Mercier–Hochelaga-Maisonneuve	Autoroute 25/TCH	Louis-Hippolyte Lafontaine (1807–1864), Prime Minister of the United Province of Canada	45°35′0″N 73°29′51″W
Louis Hippolyte Lafontaine Bridge-Tunnel	An entrance of the Louis Hippolyte Lafontaine tunnel, with a sign telling drivers that they are about to cross the Saint Lawrence.	1967^{[I]}	(I) Île Charron (Îles de Boucherville) (exit)	Autoroute 25/TCH	Louis-Hippolyte Lafontaine (1807–1864), Prime Minister of the United Province of Canada	45°35′0″N 73°29′51″W
Louis Hippolyte Lafontaine Bridge-Tunnel	An entrance of the Louis Hippolyte Lafontaine tunnel, with a sign telling drivers that they are about to cross the Saint Lawrence.	1967^{[I]}	(S) Longueuil, borough of Vieux-Longueuil	Autoroute 25/TCH	Louis-Hippolyte Lafontaine (1807–1864), Prime Minister of the United Province of Canada	45°35′0″N 73°29′51″W
Old Port of Montreal–Longueuil Ferry	The Old Port of Montreal–Longueuil Ferry at the Old Port of Montreal.		(N) Borough of Ville-Marie (Jacques-Cartier Pier, Old Port of Montreal)		—	45°30′25″N 73°33′1″W
Old Port of Montreal–Longueuil Ferry	The Old Port of Montreal–Longueuil Ferry at the Old Port of Montreal.		(I) Saint Helen's Island (Parc Jean-Drapeau)		—	45°30′40.15″N 73°32′15.5″W
Old Port of Montreal–Longueuil Ferry	The Old Port of Montreal–Longueuil Ferry at the Old Port of Montreal.		(S) Longueuil, borough of Le Vieux-Longueuil (Réal-Bouvier Marina)		—	45°32′23.6″N 73°31′4.5″W
Jacques Cartier Bridge	A cantilevered bridge, with a sunset in the background.	1930^{[J]}	(N) Borough of Ville-Marie	Route 134 Pedestrians and bicycles	Jacques Cartier (1491–1557), French explorer	45°31′17″N 73°32′28″W
Jacques Cartier Bridge	A cantilevered bridge, with a sunset in the background.	1930^{[J]}	(I) Île Sainte-Hélène (exit) and Île Notre-Dame	Route 134 Pedestrians and bicycles	Jacques Cartier (1491–1557), French explorer	45°31′17″N 73°32′28″W
Jacques Cartier Bridge	A cantilevered bridge, with a sunset in the background.	1930^{[J]}	(S) Longueuil, borough of Vieux-Longueuil	Route 134 Pedestrians and bicycles	Jacques Cartier (1491–1557), French explorer	45°31′17″N 73°32′28″W
Montreal Metro Tunnel	The exterior of a subway station entrance.	1966	(N) Borough of Ville-Marie (Berri–UQAM station)	Montreal Metro Line 4 Yellow	—	45°30′N 73°32′W
Montreal Metro Tunnel	The exterior of a subway station entrance.	1966	(I) Île Sainte-Hélène (Jean-Drapeau station) and Île Notre-Dame	Montreal Metro Line 4 Yellow	—	45°30′N 73°32′W
Montreal Metro Tunnel	The exterior of a subway station entrance.	1966	(S) Longueuil, borough of Vieux-Longueuil (Longueuil–Université-de-Sherbrooke station)	Montreal Metro Line 4 Yellow	—	45°30′N 73°32′W
Pont de la Concorde Bridge^{[B]}	A steel box-girder bridge, with part of the city skyline in the background.	1965^{[K]}	(N) Borough of Ville-Marie	Pierre-Dupuy Avenue and Route Verte 1 and 2	Reference to Montreal's motto, Concordia salus	45°30′22″N 73°32′17″W (Pont de la Concorde) 45°30′28″N 73°31′49″W (Pont des Îles)
Pont de la Concorde Bridge^{[B]}	A steel box-girder bridge, with part of the city skyline in the background.	1965^{[K]}	(I) Île Sainte-Hélène and Île Notre-Dame (Parc Jean-Drapeau), borough of Ville-Marie, Montreal	Pierre-Dupuy Avenue and Route Verte 1 and 2	Reference to Montreal's motto, Concordia salus	45°30′22″N 73°32′17″W (Pont de la Concorde) 45°30′28″N 73°31′49″W (Pont des Îles)
Victoria Bridge	The numerous truss sections of a long bridge across a large body of water.	1898^{[L]}	(N) Borough of Le Sud-Ouest	Route 112 Canadian National Railway (CN) RTM Mont-Saint-Hilaire line commuter train Via Rail and Amtrak passenger trains	Queen Victoria of the United Kingdom (1819–1901)	45°29′29″N 73°31′46″W
Victoria Bridge	The numerous truss sections of a long bridge across a large body of water.	1898^{[L]}	(S) Saint-Lambert	Route 112 Canadian National Railway (CN) RTM Mont-Saint-Hilaire line commuter train Via Rail and Amtrak passenger trains	Queen Victoria of the United Kingdom (1819–1901)	45°29′29″N 73°31′46″W
Samuel de Champlain Bridge	A view of the bridge's cantilevered main span.	2019^{[M]}	(N) Borough of Verdun	Autoroutes 10, 15, and 20	Samuel de Champlain (c. 1580–1635), founder of Quebec City	45°28′7″N 73°31′15″W
Samuel de Champlain Bridge	A view of the bridge's cantilevered main span.	2019^{[M]}	(I) Île des Sœurs (exit)	Autoroutes 10, 15, and 20	Samuel de Champlain (c. 1580–1635), founder of Quebec City	45°28′7″N 73°31′15″W
Samuel de Champlain Bridge	A view of the bridge's cantilevered main span.	2019^{[M]}	(S) Brossard	Autoroutes 10, 15, and 20	Samuel de Champlain (c. 1580–1635), founder of Quebec City	45°28′7″N 73°31′15″W
Champlain Bridge Ice Structure	A normal box girder bridge, but with closely spaced pillars.	1964^{[N]}	(I) Île des Sœurs	Route Verte 1 and 2	Samuel de Champlain (c. 1580–1635), founder of Quebec City	45°27′57″N 73°31′11″W
Champlain Bridge Ice Structure	A normal box girder bridge, but with closely spaced pillars.	1964^{[N]}	(S) St. Lawrence Seaway levee	Route Verte 1 and 2	Samuel de Champlain (c. 1580–1635), founder of Quebec City	45°27′57″N 73°31′11″W
Honoré Mercier Bridge	A view of a twinned steel truss bridge, from between the spans.	1934, 1963^{[O]}	(N) Borough of LaSalle	Route 138	Honoré Mercier (1840–1894), Premier of Quebec	45°25′0″N 73°39′18″W
Honoré Mercier Bridge	A view of a twinned steel truss bridge, from between the spans.	1934, 1963^{[O]}	(S) Kahnawake Mohawk Reserve	Route 138	Honoré Mercier (1840–1894), Premier of Quebec	45°25′0″N 73°39′18″W
Saint-Laurent Railway Bridge	A bridge with two truss sections in the middle.	1886	(N) Borough of LaSalle	Canadian Pacific Railway (CPR) Réseau de transport métropolitain (RTM) Candiac line (commuter train)	Saint Lawrence River	45°25′8″N 73°39′34″W
Saint-Laurent Railway Bridge	A bridge with two truss sections in the middle.	1886	(S) Kahnawake Mohawk Reserve	Canadian Pacific Railway (CPR) Réseau de transport métropolitain (RTM) Candiac line (commuter train)	Saint Lawrence River	45°25′8″N 73°39′34″W
Île-Dorval ferry^{[B]}			(N) Dorval			45°26′17″N 73°44′22″W
Île-Dorval ferry^{[B]}			(I) Dorval Island			45°26′0″N 73°44′32″W

==== Upper Saint Lawrence and Beauharnois Canal ====
Crossing	Picture	Year built^{[A]}	Communities linked	Carries	Name origin	Coordinates
Boulevard Edgar Hébert Bridge^{[P]} (Beauharnois Canal)			(I) Melocheville	Route 132	Edgar Hébert (1911–1984), MNA for Beauharnois (1948–1962).	45°18′57″N 73°54′28″W
Boulevard Edgar Hébert Bridge^{[P]} (Beauharnois Canal)			(S) Beauharnois	Route 132	Edgar Hébert (1911–1984), MNA for Beauharnois (1948–1962).	45°18′57″N 73°54′28″W
Pied-du-Canal Bridge (Beauharnois Canal)			(I) Melocheville	CSX Rail	Reference to the position of the bridge, close to the canal's downstream end.	45°17′58″N 73°55′13″W
Pied-du-Canal Bridge (Beauharnois Canal)			(S) Beauharnois	CSX Rail	Reference to the position of the bridge, close to the canal's downstream end.	45°17′58″N 73°55′13″W
Serge-Marcil Bridge (main channel)			(N) Vaudreuil-Dorion	Autoroute 30	Serge Marcil (1944–2010), former Member of the National Assembly who served the riding of Beauharnois	45°18′25″N 74°00′53″W
Serge-Marcil Bridge (main channel)			(I) Melocheville	Autoroute 30	Serge Marcil (1944–2010), former Member of the National Assembly who served the riding of Beauharnois	45°18′25″N 74°00′53″W
Madeleine-Parent Bridge (Beauharnois Canal)			(I) Melocheville	Autoroute 30	Madeleine Parent (1918–2012), former trade union activist	45°17′51″N 73°55′16″W
Madeleine-Parent Bridge (Beauharnois Canal)			(S) Beauharnois	Autoroute 30	Madeleine Parent (1918–2012), former trade union activist	45°17′51″N 73°55′16″W
St. Louis Bridge (Beauharnois Canal)			(I) Salaberry-de-Valleyfield (Saint-Timothée)	Boulevard Pie-XII (Salaberry); Rue du Pont (Saint-Louis)	Municipality of Saint-Louis-de-Gonzague.	45°13′50″N 74°0′4″W
St. Louis Bridge (Beauharnois Canal)			(S) Saint-Louis-de-Gonzague	Boulevard Pie-XII (Salaberry); Rue du Pont (Saint-Louis)	Municipality of Saint-Louis-de-Gonzague.	45°13′50″N 74°0′4″W
Larocque Bridge (Beauharnois Canal)			(I) Salaberry-de-Valleyfield	Autoroute 530; Route 132; Route 201	Larocque Street in Salaberry-de-Valleyfield. The origin of the name Larocque is unknown.	45°13′23″N 74°6′57″W
Larocque Bridge (Beauharnois Canal)			(S) Saint-Stanislas-de-Kostka	Autoroute 530; Route 132; Route 201	Larocque Street in Salaberry-de-Valleyfield. The origin of the name Larocque is unknown.	45°13′23″N 74°6′57″W
Monseigneur Langlois Bridge (main channel)			(N) Coteau du Lac	Route 201	Joseph-Alfred Langlois, bishop of Valleyfield	45°16′21″N 74°10′53″W
Monseigneur Langlois Bridge (main channel)			(I) Salaberry-de-Valleyfield (Grande-Île)	Route 201	Joseph-Alfred Langlois, bishop of Valleyfield	45°16′21″N 74°10′53″W
Coteau Railway Bridge (main Channel)			(N) Coteau du Lac	Canadian National Railway	Les Coteaux, Quebec	45°15′30″N 74°10′57″W
Coteau Railway Bridge (main Channel)			(I) Salaberry-de-Valleyfield (Grande-Île)	Canadian National Railway	Les Coteaux, Quebec	45°15′30″N 74°10′57″W

=== Ontario and the United States ===
==== Upper Saint Lawrence River ====
Crossing	Picture	Year built^{[A]}	Communities linked	Carries	Name origin	Coordinates
Three Nations Crossing (North Channel Bridge)		1962 2014 (replaced)	(N) Cornwall, Ontario	Brookdale Avenue/ON 138; Access to NY 37	Mohawks of Akwesasne	45°0′29″N 74°44′22″W
Three Nations Crossing (North Channel Bridge)		1962 2014 (replaced)	(I) Akwesasne (Cornwall Island, Ontario)	Brookdale Avenue/ON 138; Access to NY 37	Mohawks of Akwesasne	45°0′29″N 74°44′22″W
Three Nations Crossing (South Channel Bridge)		1958	(I) Akwesasne (Cornwall Island, Ontario)	Brookdale Avenue/ON 138; Access to NY 37	Mohawks of Akwesasne	44°59′23″N 74°44′22″W
Three Nations Crossing (South Channel Bridge)		1958	(S) Massena, New York	Brookdale Avenue/ON 138; Access to NY 37	Mohawks of Akwesasne	44°59′23″N 74°44′22″W
Ogdensburg–Prescott International Bridge		1960	(N) Johnstown, Ontario	ON 416; NY 812	Ogdensburg, New York; Prescott, Ontario	44°44′7″N 75°27′35″W
Ogdensburg–Prescott International Bridge		1960	(S) Ogdensburg, New York	ON 416; NY 812	Ogdensburg, New York; Prescott, Ontario	44°44′7″N 75°27′35″W
Thousand Islands Bridge		1938	(N) Ivy Lea, Ontario	ON 137; Interstate 81	Thousand Islands	44°20′51″N 75°59′1″W
Thousand Islands Bridge		1938	(I) Wellesley Island, New York	ON 137; Interstate 81	Thousand Islands	44°20′51″N 75°59′1″W
Thousand Islands Bridge		1938	(S) Orleans, New York	ON 137; Interstate 81	Thousand Islands	44°20′51″N 75°59′1″W
Murray Isle Ferry^{[B]}			(I) Murray Isle, New York			
Murray Isle Ferry^{[B]}			(S) Mason Point, New York			
Grindstone Island Ferry^{[B]}			(I) Grindstone Island, New York			
Grindstone Island Ferry^{[B]}			(S) Clayton, New York			
Howe Island Township Ferry^{[B]}			(N) Gananoque, Ontario			
Howe Island Township Ferry^{[B]}			(I) Howe Island, Ontario			
Howe Island County Ferry^{[B]}			(N) Pitt's Ferry, Ontario			
Howe Island County Ferry^{[B]}			(I) Howe Island, Ontario			
Carleton Island Ferry^{[B]}			(I) Carleton Island, New York			
Carleton Island Ferry^{[B]}			(S) Cape Vincent, New York			
Kingston-Wolfe Island Ferry			(N) Kingston, Ontario	Frontenac County Road 95 (Ontario Side)		44°13′55″N 76°28′34″W
Kingston-Wolfe Island Ferry			(I) Wolfe Island, Ontario	Frontenac County Road 95 (Ontario Side)		44°11′38″N 76°26′34″W
Horne's Ferry			(I) Wolfe Island, Ontario	Frontenac County Road 95 (Ontario Side)		44°8′7″N 76°21′14″W
Horne's Ferry			(S) Cape Vincent, New York	Frontenac County Road 95 (Ontario Side)		44°7′48″N 76°20′6″W

==== Lake Ontario and Niagara River ====
Crossing	Picture	Year built^{[A]}	Communities linked	Carries	Name origin	Coordinates
Burlington Bay James N. Allan Skyway^{[R]}		1958; 1985	(N) Burlington, Ontario	Queen Elizabeth Way	James Noble Allan (1894–1992), Ontario Minister of Highways and Chairman of the Niagara Parks Commission.	43°17′52″N 79°47′48″W
Burlington Bay James N. Allan Skyway^{[R]}		1958; 1985	(S) Hamilton, Ontario	Queen Elizabeth Way	James Noble Allan (1894–1992), Ontario Minister of Highways and Chairman of the Niagara Parks Commission.	43°17′52″N 79°47′48″W
Lewiston-Queenston Bridge		1962	(N) Queenston, ON	Highway 405; I-190	Lewiston, New York; Queenston, Ontario	43°09′11″N 79°02′41″W
Lewiston-Queenston Bridge		1962	(S) Lewiston, NY	Highway 405; I-190	Lewiston, New York; Queenston, Ontario	43°09′11″N 79°02′41″W
Whirlpool Rapids Bridge		1897	(N) Niagara Falls, Ontario	Road (for NEXUS users only) and Amtrak/Via passenger trains	Whirlpool Rapids	43°06′33″N 79°03′30″W
Whirlpool Rapids Bridge		1897	(S) Niagara Falls, New York	Road (for NEXUS users only) and Amtrak/Via passenger trains	Whirlpool Rapids	43°06′33″N 79°03′30″W
Michigan Central Railway Bridge		1925	(N) Niagara Falls, Ontario	Disused (was Canadian Pacific Railway)	Michigan Central Railroad, which originally built the bridge.	43°06′30.80″N 79°03′29.76″W
Michigan Central Railway Bridge		1925	(S) Niagara Falls, New York	Disused (was Canadian Pacific Railway)	Michigan Central Railroad, which originally built the bridge.	43°06′30.80″N 79°03′29.76″W
Rainbow Bridge		1941	(N) Niagara Falls, Ontario	Access to Highway 420 (not open to commercial trucks)	Rainbows forming over Niagara Falls, which can be seen from the bridge.	43°05′25″N 79°04′04″W
Rainbow Bridge		1941	(S) Niagara Falls, New York	Access to Highway 420 (not open to commercial trucks)	Rainbows forming over Niagara Falls, which can be seen from the bridge.	43°05′25″N 79°04′04″W
North Grand Island Bridge		1935; 1964	(N) Niagara Falls, New York	I-190	Grand Island, New York.	43°04′08″N 78°59′27″W
North Grand Island Bridge		1935; 1964	(I) Grand Island, New York	I-190	Grand Island, New York.	43°04′08″N 78°59′27″W
South Grand Island Bridge		1935; 1962	(I) Grand Island, New York	I-190	Grand Island, New York.	42°59′55″N 78°56′13″W
South Grand Island Bridge		1935; 1962	(S) Tonawanda, New York	I-190	Grand Island, New York.	42°59′55″N 78°56′13″W
International Railway Bridge		1873	(N) Fort Erie, Ontario	Canadian National Railway		42°55′44″N 78°54′36″W
International Railway Bridge		1873	(S) Buffalo, New York	Canadian National Railway		42°55′44″N 78°54′36″W
Peace Bridge		1927	(N) Fort Erie, Ontario	Queen Elizabeth Way	100 years of peace between the United States and Canada.	42°54′25″N 78°54′21″W
Peace Bridge		1927	(S) Buffalo, New York	Queen Elizabeth Way	100 years of peace between the United States and Canada.	42°54′25″N 78°54′21″W

==== Lake Erie / Bass Islands ====
Crossing	Picture	Year built^{[A]}	Communities linked	Carries	Name origin	Coordinates
Leamington - Pelee Island - Sandusky Ferry			(N) Leamington, Ontario	North end: Erie Street; Middle: Pelee Island Ferry Terminal; South End: US 6 US 250; Ohio SR 4 Ohio SR 101	—	
Leamington - Pelee Island - Sandusky Ferry			(I) Pelee Island	North end: Erie Street; Middle: Pelee Island Ferry Terminal; South End: US 6 US 250; Ohio SR 4 Ohio SR 101	—	
Leamington - Pelee Island - Sandusky Ferry			(S) Sandusky, Ohio	North end: Erie Street; Middle: Pelee Island Ferry Terminal; South End: US 6 US 250; Ohio SR 4 Ohio SR 101	—	
Marblehead - Kelleys Island Ferry			(I) Kelleys Island, Ohio	Connecting: Ohio SR 575; Ohio SR 163	—	
Marblehead - Kelleys Island Ferry			(S) Marblehead, Ohio	Connecting: Ohio SR 575; Ohio SR 163	—	
Put-In-Bay - Port Clinton Ferry			(I) Put-In-Bay, Ohio	Connecting: Ohio SR 357; Ohio SR 53	—	
Put-In-Bay - Port Clinton Ferry			(S) Port Clinton, Ohio	Connecting: Ohio SR 357; Ohio SR 53	—	

==== Detroit and St. Clair Rivers ====
Crossing	Picture	Year built^{[A]}	Communities linked	Carries	Name origin	Coordinates
Wayne County Bridge		1931 (1873)	(I) Trenton, Michigan	Grosse Ile Parkway	Grosse Ile, Michigan	42°07′39″N 83°10′31″W
Wayne County Bridge		1931 (1873)	(S) Riverview, Michigan	Grosse Ile Parkway	Grosse Ile, Michigan	42°07′39″N 83°10′31″W
Grosse Ile Toll Bridge		1913	(I) Riverview, Michigan	Bridge Road	Grosse Ile, Michigan	42°10′20″N 83°09′34″W
Grosse Ile Toll Bridge		1913	(S) Riverview, Michigan	Bridge Road	Grosse Ile, Michigan	42°10′20″N 83°09′34″W
Gordie Howe International Bridge		2026	(N) Windsor, Ontario	Rt. Hon. Herb Gray Parkway extension of Ontario Highway 401; Access to Interstate 75	Gordie Howe, famed ice hockey player for the Detroit Red Wings	42.2880°N 83.0975°W
Gordie Howe International Bridge		2026	(S) Detroit, Michigan	Rt. Hon. Herb Gray Parkway extension of Ontario Highway 401; Access to Interstate 75	Gordie Howe, famed ice hockey player for the Detroit Red Wings	42.2880°N 83.0975°W
Ambassador Bridge		1927	(N) Windsor, Ontario	Ontario Highway 3 Access to Interstate 75, Interstate 96		42°18′43″N 83°04′27″W
Ambassador Bridge		1927	(S) Detroit, Michigan	Ontario Highway 3 Access to Interstate 75, Interstate 96		42°18′43″N 83°04′27″W
Michigan Central Railway Tunnel		1910	(N) Windsor, Ontario	Canadian Pacific Railway	Michigan Central Railroad, which originally built the tunnel.	42°19′15″N 83°03′05″W
Michigan Central Railway Tunnel		1910	(S) Detroit, Michigan	Canadian Pacific Railway	Michigan Central Railroad, which originally built the tunnel.	42°19′15″N 83°03′05″W
Detroit–Windsor Tunnel		1930	(N) Windsor, ON	Access to Interstate 375, M-3, M-10	Detroit, Michigan; Windsor, Ontario	42°19′28″N 83°02′24″W
Detroit–Windsor Tunnel		1930	(S) Detroit, MI	Access to Interstate 375, M-3, M-10	Detroit, Michigan; Windsor, Ontario	42°19′28″N 83°02′24″W
MacArthur Bridge		1923	(I) Belle Isle, Michigan	Grand Boulevard	General Douglas MacArthur, who led American troops in the Philippines Campaign during World War II.	42°20′33″N 82°59′54″W
MacArthur Bridge		1923	(S) Detroit, Michigan	Grand Boulevard	General Douglas MacArthur, who led American troops in the Philippines Campaign during World War II.	42°20′33″N 82°59′54″W
Champion Auto Ferry			(N) Algonac, Michigan	Connecting: M-29; M-154	—	
Champion Auto Ferry			(I) Harsens Island, Michigan	Connecting: M-29; M-154	—	
Algonac - Walpole Island Ferry			(W) Algonac, Michigan	Connections to: M-29	—	
Algonac - Walpole Island Ferry			(I) Walpole Island, Ontario	Connections to: M-29	—	
Blue Water Ferry			(W) Marine City, Michigan	Connections to: M-29; St. Clair Parkway / Lambton County Road 33	—	
Blue Water Ferry			(E) Sombra, Ontario	Connections to: M-29; St. Clair Parkway / Lambton County Road 33	—	
St. Clair Tunnel		1891	(E) Sarnia, Ontario	Canadian National Railway	St. Clair River	42°57′30″N 82°24′38″W
St. Clair Tunnel		1891	(W) Port Huron, Michigan	Canadian National Railway	St. Clair River	42°57′30″N 82°24′38″W
Blue Water Bridge		1938	(E) Sarnia, Ontario	Highway 402; Interstates 69/94		42°59′54″N 82°25′24″W
Blue Water Bridge		1938	(W) Port Huron, Michigan	Highway 402; Interstates 69/94		42°59′54″N 82°25′24″W

==== Straits of Mackinac and Soo Locks area ====
Crossing	Picture	Year built^{[A]}	Communities linked	Carries	Name origin	Coordinates
Bois Blanc Island Ferry			(I) Pointe Aux Pins, Michigan	Connections with: US 23; M-27; County Road C-66		
Bois Blanc Island Ferry			(S) Cheboygan, Michigan	Connections with: US 23; M-27; County Road C-66		
Mackinaw City - Mackinac Island Ferry			(I) Mackinac Island, Michigan	Connecting: M-185 with: Interstate 75; US 23 (bicycles and pedestrians only)		
Mackinaw City - Mackinac Island Ferry			(S) Mackinaw City, Michigan	Connecting: M-185 with: Interstate 75; US 23 (bicycles and pedestrians only)		
St. Ignace - Mackinac Island Ferry			(I) Mackinac Island, Michigan	Connecting: M-185 with: Interstate 75; US 2 (bicycles and pedestrians only)		
St. Ignace - Mackinac Island Ferry			(W) St. Ignace, Michigan	Connecting: M-185 with: Interstate 75; US 2 (bicycles and pedestrians only)		
Drummond Island Ferry			(I) Drummond Island, Michigan	M-134		
Drummond Island Ferry			(W) De Tour Village, Michigan	M-134		
Barbeau - Neebish Island Ferry			(I) Neebish Island, Michigan	Ferry Road		
Barbeau - Neebish Island Ferry			(W) Barbeau, Michigan	Ferry Road		
Sugar Island Ferry			(I) Sugar Island, Michigan	Connecting: Portage Avenue / Riverside Drive with 1 1/2 Mile Road		
Sugar Island Ferry			(W) Sault Ste. Marie, Michigan	Connecting: Portage Avenue / Riverside Drive with 1 1/2 Mile Road		
Sault Ste. Marie International Bridge		1962	(N) Sault Ste. Marie, Ontario	Interstate 75	Sault Ste. Marie, twin cities in Ontario and Michigan	46°30′12″N 84°21′45″W
Sault Ste. Marie International Bridge		1962	(S) Sault Ste. Marie, Michigan	Interstate 75	Sault Ste. Marie, twin cities in Ontario and Michigan	46°30′12″N 84°21′45″W
Mackinac Bridge		1957	(N) St. Ignace, Michigan	Interstate 75	Straits of Mackinac	45°49′02″N 84°43′39″W
Mackinac Bridge		1957	(S) Mackinaw City, Michigan	Interstate 75	Straits of Mackinac	45°49′02″N 84°43′39″W

==== Lake Huron / Georgian Bay, Ontario ====
Crossing	Picture	Year built^{[A]}	Communities linked	Carries	Name origin	Coordinates
Bernt Gilbertson Bridge			(I) St. Joseph Island	Highway 548	Bernt Gilbertson (1912–1995), MPP for Algoma, 1967–1975	
Bernt Gilbertson Bridge			(N) 2 km south of Highway 17/TCH west of Desbarats	Highway 548	Bernt Gilbertson (1912–1995), MPP for Algoma, 1967–1975	
Little Current Swing Bridge			(S) Little Current	Highway 6	Little Current, Ontario	
Little Current Swing Bridge			(N) Turner	Highway 6	Little Current, Ontario	
MS Chi-Cheemaun Ferry			(S) South Baymouth	Highway 6	"Big canoe" in Ojibwe	
MS Chi-Cheemaun Ferry			(N) Tobermory	Highway 6	"Big canoe" in Ojibwe	

==== Lake Superior ====
Crossing	Picture	Year built^{[A]}	Communities linked	Carries	Name origin	Coordinates
Portage Lake Lift Bridge		1959	(N) Hancock, Michigan	US 41; M-26	Portage Lake, a segment of the Keweenaw Waterway	
Portage Lake Lift Bridge		1959	(S) Houghton, Michigan	US 41; M-26	Portage Lake, a segment of the Keweenaw Waterway	
Isle Royale ferry			(N) Isle Royale, Michigan			
Isle Royale ferry			(S) Houghton, Michigan			
Madeline Island Ferry			(I) La Pointe, Wisconsin	Connecting: County Road H WIS 13		
Madeline Island Ferry			(S) Bayfield, Wisconsin	Connecting: County Road H WIS 13		
Aerial Lift Bridge		1905	(N) Duluth, Minnesota	S Lake Avenue		
Aerial Lift Bridge		1905	(S) Minnesota Point, Minnesota	S Lake Avenue		
John A. Blatnik Bridge		1961	(E) Superior, Wisconsin	Interstate 535; US 53	John Blatnik (1911–1991), Congressional Representative for Minnesota's 8th congressional district, 1947–1975	
John A. Blatnik Bridge		1961	(W) Duluth, Minnesota	Interstate 535; US 53	John Blatnik (1911–1991), Congressional Representative for Minnesota's 8th congressional district, 1947–1975	
Richard I. Bong Memorial Bridge		1985	(E) Superior, Wisconsin	US 2	Richard Ira Bong (1920–1945), World War II fighter pilot	
Richard I. Bong Memorial Bridge		1985	(W) Duluth, Minnesota	US 2	Richard Ira Bong (1920–1945), World War II fighter pilot	

==== Lake Michigan ====
Crossing	Picture	Year built^{[A]}	Communities linked	Carries	Name origin	Coordinates
Beaver Island Ferry			(I) Beaver Island, Michigan	Connection to: US 31		
Beaver Island Ferry			(S) Charlevoix, Michigan	Connection to: US 31		
North Manitou Island Ferry			(E) Leland, Michigan	Connection to: M-22		
North Manitou Island Ferry			(I) North Manitou Island, Michigan	Connection to: M-22		
South Manitou Island Ferry			(E) Leland, Michigan	Connection to: M-22		
South Manitou Island Ferry			(I) South Manitou Island, Michigan	Connection to: M-22		
Washington Island Ferry			(I) Washington Island, Wisconsin	Connecting: County Road W WIS 42		
Washington Island Ferry			(S) Northport, Door County, Wisconsin	Connecting: County Road W WIS 42		
SS Badger			(E) Ludington, Michigan	US 10	"Bucky Badger", athletic mascot for the University of Wisconsin–Madison	
SS Badger			(W) Manitowoc, Wisconsin	US 10	"Bucky Badger", athletic mascot for the University of Wisconsin–Madison	
Lake Express Ferry			(E) Muskegon, Michigan	Connections with: Muskegon: Estes Street to: US 31; Interstate 96; M-46; Milwaukee: Interstate 794; WIS 794		
Lake Express Ferry			(W) Milwaukee, Wisconsin	Connections with: Muskegon: Estes Street to: US 31; Interstate 96; M-46; Milwaukee: Interstate 794; WIS 794		

== See also ==
- List of crossings of the Rivière des Mille Îles
- List of crossings of the Rivière des Prairies
- List of bridges to the Island of Montreal
- List of crossings of the Ottawa River

== Notes ==
^{A} The year of construction of the original structure. In the case of ferries, no date is given, as the beginning of a ferry link is often not documented.

^{B} Provides only a partial crossing.

^{D} Nordik Express offers, in addition to links to Rimouski, Sept-Îles, and Havre-Saint-Pierre, a ferry link to several communities along the Basse-Côte-Nord. Its easternmost terminal is in Blanc-Sablon, Quebec.

^{E} Quebec Bridge is the lowermost fixed crossing of the whole river.

^{I} The Louis-Hippolyte Lafontaine complex consists of a tunnel from Montreal to Île Charron and a bridge from Île Charron to the South Shore.

^{J} Jacques-Cartier Bridge was originally named Harbour Bridge/Pont du Havre, and renamed after Jacques Cartier in 1934 (400th anniversary of Cartier's first voyage). The section over the St. Lawrence Seaway was lifted to a new height in 1962.

^{K} Pont de la Concorde (Concorde Bridge) and Pont des Îles ("Bridge of the Islands") were built for Expo 67. Pont de la Concorde connects Montreal Island to Saint Helen's Island, while Pont des Îles connects Saint Helen's Island to Notre-Dame Island.

^{L} Victoria Bridge was built as a one-track tubular bridge which opened in 1860, then rebuilt as a two-track truss bridge in 1898. The South Y approach was rebuilt around the Saint-Lambert locks of the St. Lawrence Seaway in 1961.

^{M} At the north end of Champlain Bridge, two spans, one north-south (aut. 15 and 20) and one east-west (aut. 10) connect Île des Sœurs to I. of Montreal. These two spans, called Pont Île-des-Sœurs and Pont Clément, are part of the Champlain Bridge complex.

^{N} The Champlain Bridge Ice Structure, known in French as "l'Estacade Champlain," was built to control ice floes coming from the Laprairie Basin.

^{O} The section of Honoré-Mercier bridge spanning over the St. Lawrence Seaway was rebuilt to seaway standards in the 1950s. The bridge was twinned by an identical one, on the downriver side, which opened in 1963.

^{P} The Edgar Hébert Boulevard crossing consists of a suspension bridge over the discharge of the Beauharnois Power Station and a tunnel under the locks of Beauharnois Canal.

^{Q} The South Channel Bridge was demolished in 1958, and the North Channel Bridge in 1965.

^{R} The Burlington Bay Skyway does not cross between both sides of the St. Lawrence/Great Lakes river system, but it is a major thoroughfare crossing the western tip of Lake Ontario, which allows motorists to drive around the city of Hamilton.
