= Olivier Charbonneau =

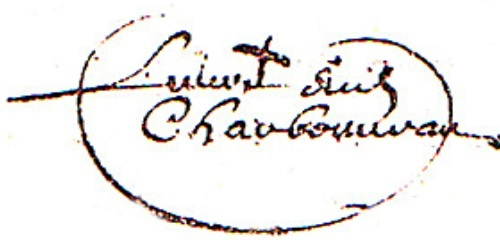
- Born: c. 1613; Aunis
- Died: 20 November 1687; Montreal

Olivier Charbonneau (France, Aunis c. 1613 Île de Montréal 20 November 1687) was a frontiersman who lived in Old Montreal in New France.

Charbonneau started his working life as a sewer cleaner in Marans, Charente-Maritime. Widowed twice, by Ozanne Lussaud, then by Marguerite Roy in Marans (m. 13 April 1646), he then married Marie-Marguerite Garnier c. 1656. It is recorded that at that time his wife Marie-Marguerite was niece to Marguerite Bourgeoys.

He was one of the first settlers of the Île Jésus (today, Laval). He is the ancestor of 35,000 living North Americans, and ancestor of the entire population of families with the surname Labelle, through his daughter Anne.

There are only two surviving records for the family name of Charbonneau: one for Olivier and his wife, landing in 1659, and another for an unrelated man, Jean and his wife, around 1675. Nothing in the record suggests that the two were closely related. It has been estimated that 97% of the Charbonneau families in North America are descended from Olivier Charbonneau and his wife. Descendants of Jean are fewer in number and in New France have tended to cluster in the Vaudreuil and Soulanges area of Quebec near the Ottawa river.

== Migration ==
In search of a better future, with his wife and their two-year-old daughter Anne, he sailed for New France on the ship "Saint-André" from La Rochelle on 2 July 1659. In La Rochelle, less than a month earlier (as notarised by Demontreau on 5 June 1659), he was hired as "manual labourer", that is to say, to do spade work on farms, not having his own plough, for Ville-Marie, Montreal by the Society of Our Lady of Montreal; he was recruited by Jeanne Mance. This two-year contract earned Charbonneau enough money for his passage to Quebec (175 livres and 31 livres 12 sols 6 deniers) plus accommodation costs at La Rochelle and buying a travel trunk "at home in this city of the Grace of God for their expenses and for acquiring a chest to put their clothes".

Ten years later, on 10 October 1669 in Ville-Marie, the notary Bénigne Basset signed an amnesty of debtors in the hope of encouraging people to live in Ville-Marie. Their debts were enormous, each family's larger than an annual wage. The debt was wiped out by Jeanne Mance and her generous donors.

Charbonneau's family thus is one of the eight founding families of Aunis, and under that amnesty they were bound by contract to migrate to New France.

== Island of Montreal ==
Charbonneau and his wife raised a family at Ville-Marie: Anne (born 1657), Joseph (1660), Jean (1662), Élisabeth (1664), and Michel (1666).

After some years they moved from Ville-Marie to Pointe-aux-Trembles (on the eastern tip of Île de Montréal), and there he built a windmill, with his son and, their partner Pierre Dagenets (Dagenais).

== On the île Jésus ==
His daughter Anne married Guillaume Labelle in 1671. Olivier Charbonneau settled in the region which today constitutes the parish of St. Francis de Sales in Laval, where he became the first permanent resident with his son-in-law. He is considered as the first citizen of the city of Laval, on the island north of Montreal.

On 29 October 1675 Olivier Charbonneau received the first land grant in this area. Pierre Boucher, formerly governor of Trois-Rivières became Procurator of the Prelate of Quebec François de Laval, who signed the deed of sale. Olivier has left his mark there, because, like most others of his time, he was illiterate.

== Death ==
Charbonneau died in Pointe-aux-Trembles, Quebec on 20 November 1687, aged 74 years. and his burial took place the same day at Rivière-des-Prairies, close by.

== Notable descendants ==
- Antoine Labelle, curate of the Laurentides
- Hubert Charbonneau, genealogist, and co-founder of the Quebec Programme de recherche en demographie historique-PRDH (Research program in historical demography)
- Toussaint Charbonneau, who went on the Lewis and Clark Expedition, was married to Sacagawea; their son Jean-Baptiste Charbonneau was born on the Expedition, the start to his exceptional life
- Joseph Charbonneau, Bishop of Hearst and later Archbishop of Montreal
- Yvon Charbonneau, politician
- Joseph Thomas Hay, Radio/Television Broadcaster, Actor Ottawa, Ontario son of Mary Melina Charbonneau.

== Legend ==
- The Avenue Olivier-Charbonneau in Montreal.
- A statue in his image in Laval, Quebec.
- The Olivier-Charbonneau berge (or parc) in Laval, in remembrance of the first population of île Jésus.
- Both in France and in Quebec (until 2010) there are two "Charbonneau associations", the descendants of whom meet regularly. The last meeting of record was in 2007 at St-Joseph-du-Lac, Quebec for the group in Canada.
- The Olivier-Charbonneau Bridge into Montreal, and Quebec Autoroute 25.

== See also ==
- Olivier-Charbonneau Bridge
- Guillaume Labelle
