= Olivier-Charbonneau Bridge =

Olivier Charbonneau Bridge
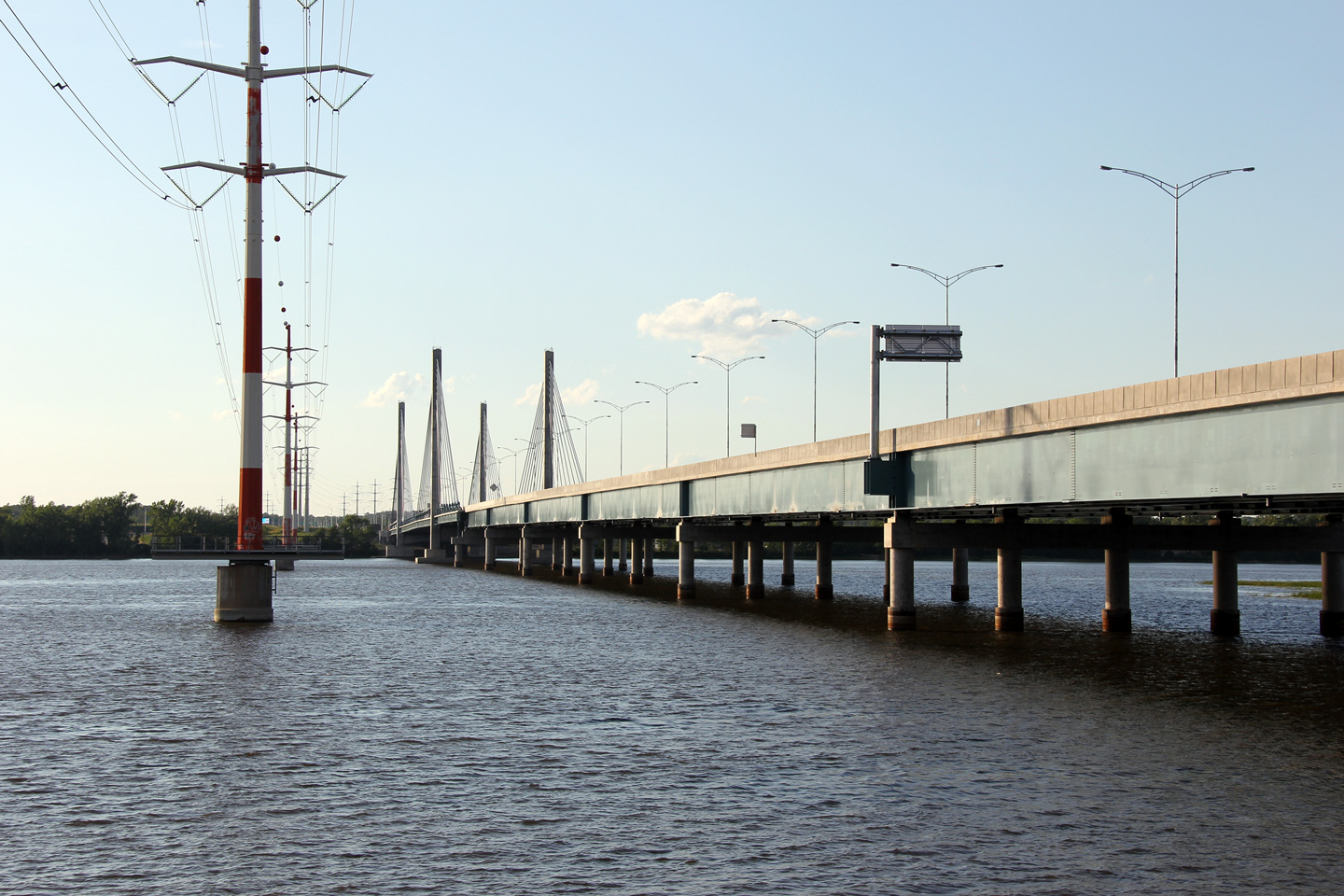
- The A25 Bridge connecting Montreal and Laval, Quebec.
- Coordinates: 45°38′16″N 73°37′14″W
- Carries: Six lanes of A-25
- Crosses: Rivière des Prairies
- Locale: between Laval (St. François District, Quebec) and Montreal (Rivière-des-Prairies–Pointe-aux-Trembles)
- Official name: Pont Olivier-Charbonneau

Characteristics
- Design: Cabled-Stayed Bridge

History
- Opened: May 21, 2011

Statistics
- Daily traffic: 36,400 (2013)
- Toll: $2.24-$3.20 with transponder, add $5.34 with picture

Location
- Interactive map of Olivier Charbonneau Bridge

The Olivier Charbonneau Bridge is a toll bridge over the Rivière des Prairies, between Laval's St. François district and Montreal's Rivière-des-Prairies–Pointe-aux-Trembles borough. Along with the Serge-Marcil Bridge, it is one of two toll bridges in Quebec.

== Toponymy ==
Before May 2012, the bridge was called the A25 Bridge. It was then renamed to commemorate Olivier Charbonneau (1613–1687), French frontiersman and first inhabitant of Île Jésus, where the city of Laval now stands.

== History ==
The Olivier Charbonneau Bridge was part of a 7.2 km (4.5 mi)-long project for the completion of Highway 25, and allows cars, trucks and buses to avoid the Pie IX Bridge upstream. It also provides a route around the city of Montreal by connecting the Louis Hippolyte Lafontaine Tunnel to Highway 440, thus allowing motorists to avoid the congested Metropolitan Expressway. It is the second modern toll bridge built in Quebec and the first ever built in the Montreal Metropolitan Area since the abolition of toll fares on the Champlain bridge in 1990.

The long anticipated construction began in early 2008, despite a last-ditch attempt by Greenpeace to block the project, and the bridge was opened to traffic on May 21, 2011, at 12:30pm (EDT). It was completed on time and on budget for $500 million.

== Characteristics ==
The Olivier Charbonneau Bridge is a high cable-stayed bridge carrying 6 lanes of Quebec Autoroute 25, thus 3 lanes per direction, separated by a central reservation. A cycling path is also available on the east side of the bridge.

In June 2011, shortly after the bridge's opening, over 25,000 vehicles were crossing the bridge daily. A year later, in May 2012, over 35,000 vehicles were already crossing the bridge every day, for a total of 12.8 million per year.

== Administration and Electronic Toll ==
The bridge is the property of Concession A25, S.E.C., a limited partnership regrouping the Macquarie Group and construction enterprises. Such a partnership is a funding model between the government and a private company. The Olivier Charbonneau Bridge is yet one of the rare infrastructure construction projects using such a funding model.

The bridge uses an electronic toll system that allows cars to cross without having to stop at a traditional booth, ultimately reducing traffic. Users can activate an A25 client account at www.A25.com and install a transponder (electronic sticker) on their vehicle's windshield. Crossing the bridge without a transponder triggers the system to automatically take a picture of the vehicle's license plate and send an invoice by mail. Users must settle the bridge-crossing toll and the applicable administration fees in the prescribed time, otherwise additional collection charges may be added to the toll.

The fee schedule varies on the vehicle's size (over or under 230 cm in length), the crossing time of day and the traffic when over a certain threshold. Pedestrians, cyclists and, since January 1, 2016, electric vehicles can cross the bridge for free.

== See also ==
- List of crossings of the Rivière des Prairies
- List of bridges in Canada
- List of bridges in Montreal
- List of toll bridges
- Olivier Charbonneau, (c.1613-1687) first European settler of Île Jésus, after whom the bridge was named.
