= Montreal Archipelago Ecological Park =

Montreal Archipelago Ecological Park (French: Parc Écologique de l’Archipel de Montréal) is a project to create a new Quebec provincial park within an approximate radius of 50 kilometres (31.1 mi) around the Island of Montreal, in Quebec, Canada. The project was announced to the public at a press conference in Montreal on October 1, 2007. In September 2008, environmental groups renewed calls for the Government of Quebec to create the park.

== See also ==
- Hochelaga Archipelago
- Îles-de-Boucherville National Park
