= Laviolette Bridge =

Bridge in Trois-Rivières and Bécancour, Quebec

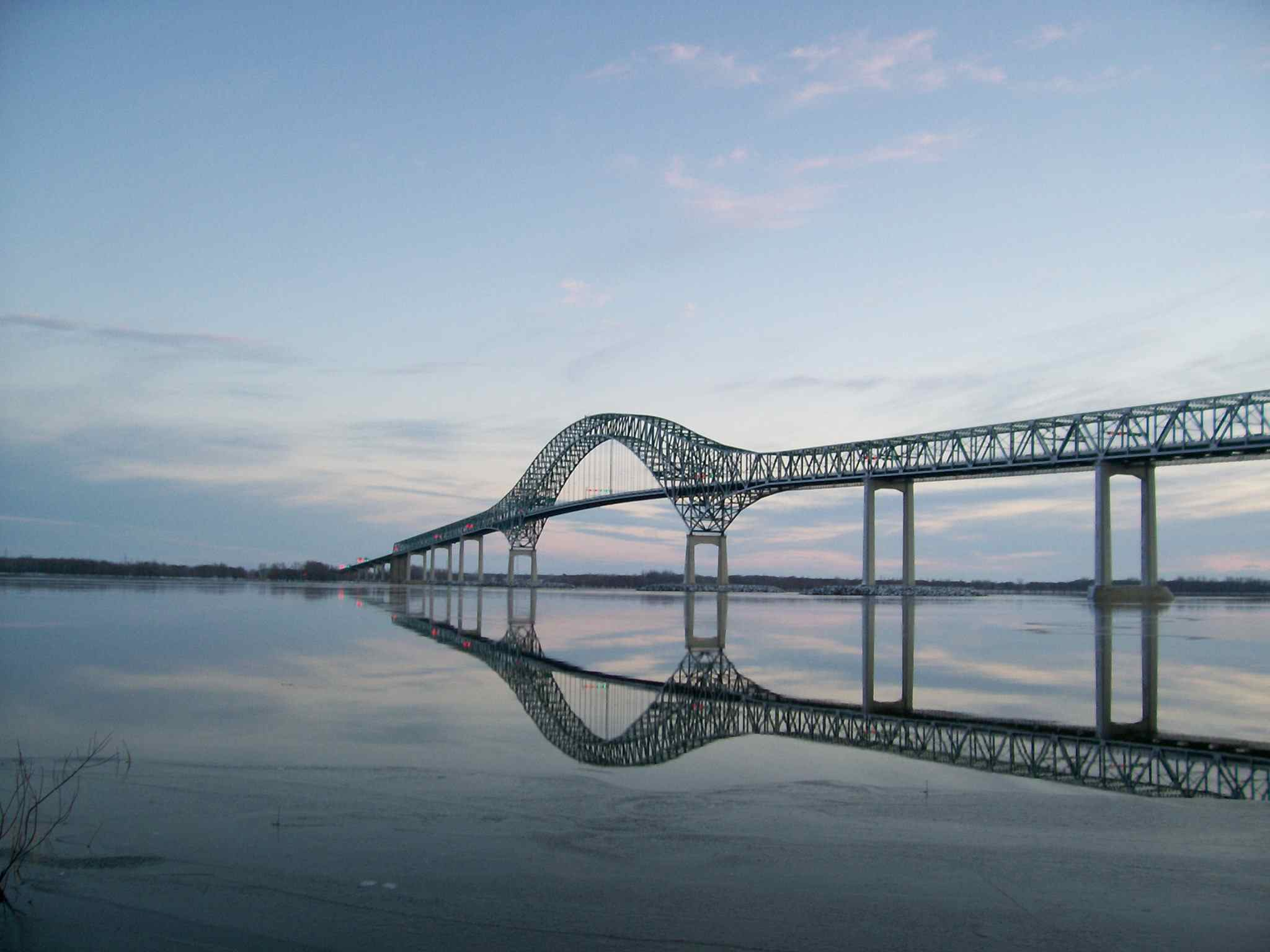
- Coordinates: 46°18′24″N 72°33′38″W
- Carries: A-55
- Crosses: St. Lawrence River
- Locale: Trois-Rivières and Bécancour, Quebec

Characteristics
- Design: Through arch bridge
- Total length: 2,707 m (8,881 ft)
- Longest span: 335 m (1,100 ft)
- Clearance below: 54.8 m (180 ft)
- No. of lanes: 4

History
- Opened: December 20, 1967

Statistics
- Daily traffic: 41,000

Location
- Interactive map of Laviolette Bridge

The Laviolette Bridge (French: pont Laviolette) is an arch bridge connecting the city of Trois-Rivières to Bécancour on the south shore of the Saint Lawrence River via Autoroute 55.

== Overview ==
Laviolette Bridge is the only bridge that spans the Saint Lawrence River between Montreal and Quebec City; it provides an important connection between the North and South shores of the river, with approximately 40,000 vehicles crossing the bridge each day.

The bridge, an impressive structure with elegant aesthetics, has become a major landmark of Trois-Rivières and the Mauricie region. It is ranked as the 61st among the world's longest arch bridge spans.

== History ==
Popular demand for a bridge had existed since the late 19th century. The construction of Laviolette Bridge did not start until 1964. On September 8, 1965, an explosion led to the bursting of a caisson because of water pressure, causing the death of twelve workers.

The bridge was inaugurated on December 20, 1967 by Fernand Lafontaine, the ministre de la voirie (minister of highways) of the government of Daniel Johnson, Sr. It thus replaced the former ferry system in place. The name honours the founder of Trois-Rivières, the Sieur de Laviolette.

In 2005, the Ministry of Transport of Québec began a three-year major renovation project, which caused major traffic jams throughout the summer of 2005, when the middle of the bridge was repaired. In 2006, the northern end was redone, followed by the southern end in 2007.

== Specifications ==
- Construction: 1964–1967
- Cost: $50 million (CAD)
- Pillars: 34
- Total length: 2,707 m
- Main span: 335 m

== See also ==
- Lake Saint-Pierre
- List of crossings of the Saint Lawrence River
- List of bridges in Canada
