= Jacques Buteux =

French-born Jesuit missionary (1600–1652)

Jacques Buteux (11 April 1600 – 10 May 1652) was a French-born Jesuit who became a missionary in Canada.

== Biography ==
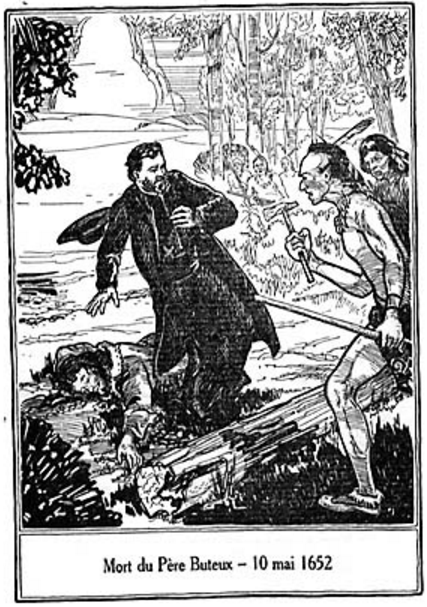
Death of Buteux

Jacques Buteux was born 11 April 1600 in Abbeville, Picardy, the son of a tanner.

On 2 October 1620 he entered the Society of Jesus at Rouen. From 1622 to 1625 he studied philosophy at the Collège in La Flèche, where the revered Acadian missioner Énemond Massé was in residence prior to his second trip to New France. Buteux was ordained priest in 1633. After his course of theology in la Flèche (1629–33), he became prefect at the College of Clermont.

Buteux arrived in Quebec on 24 June 1634 and his superior, Paul Le Jeune assigned him to the trading post at Trois-Rivières, under command of the Sieur de Laviolette. The post was still under construction when he arrived on 8 Sept. 1634. Trois-Rivières was favored at that time by the Montagnais, Algonquin and Huron as a location for trading with the French. As the congregation grew there had to be a separate Mass in French, as the small chapel could not hold everyone. In 1641 Jean de Quen and Joseph Poncet were sent to assist him.

An effort to establish a native settlement at the Cap de Trois-Rivières, on the left bank of the St. Maurice River having failed, French settlers were recruited. In 1649, fourteen land-grants were issued. This is the origin of the present town of Cap-de-la-Madeleine.

In 1642 he was at Sillery. He visited the post of Tadoussac, from 1644 to 1647. On April 4, 1651, Buteux left to go serve the mission of Saint-Pierre, north of Trois-Rivières, accompanied by a young Frenchman and a young Huron named Tsondoutannen. The three were ambushed by a party of Iroquois, who seized Tsondoutannen. Buteux fell, struck by two bullets in the chest. A third musket ball shattered his right arm. A young French soldier, Pierre Fontarabie, was also killed. Their bodies were thrown into the St. Maurice River. Tsondoutannen managed to escape and brought word back to Trois-Rivières.

Buteux had left letters and many documents in the parish registers giving historians a good profile of his time in Canada.

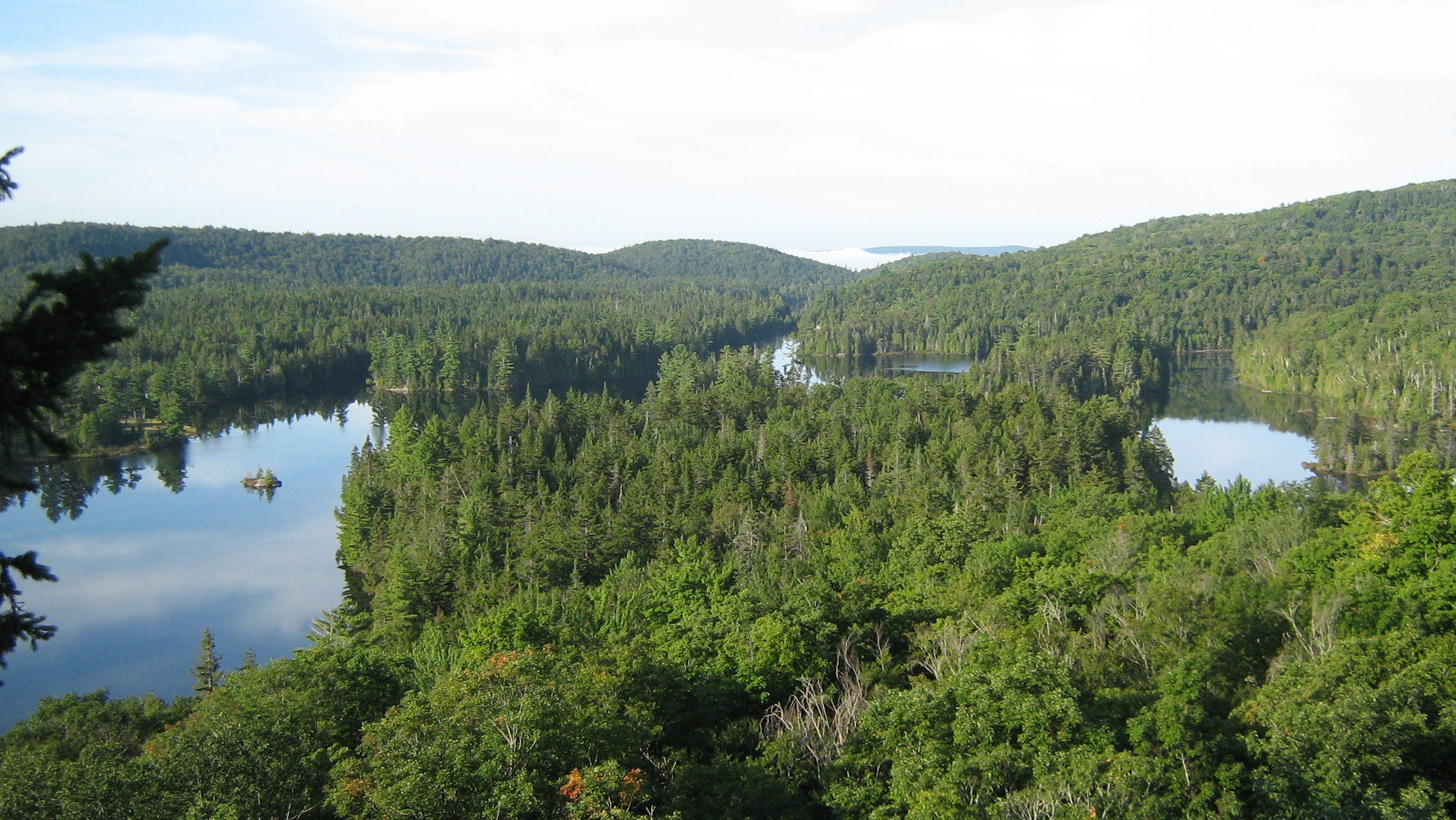
Lac des Îles (Grandes-Piles) from Fr. Jacques Buteux Section

== Legacy ==
A school is named in his honor both in Trois-Rivières and La Tuque. A street is named after him in La Tuque.

A National Trail section bearing the name of Jacques-Buteux connects the rest stop of highway 155 of Grandes-Piles on the road 159. The section is 12.9 km.

The microbrewery Le Trou du Diable in Shawinigan created a type of abbey beer in his honor.
