= Saint-Esprit, Quebec =

Saint-Esprit
- Municipality
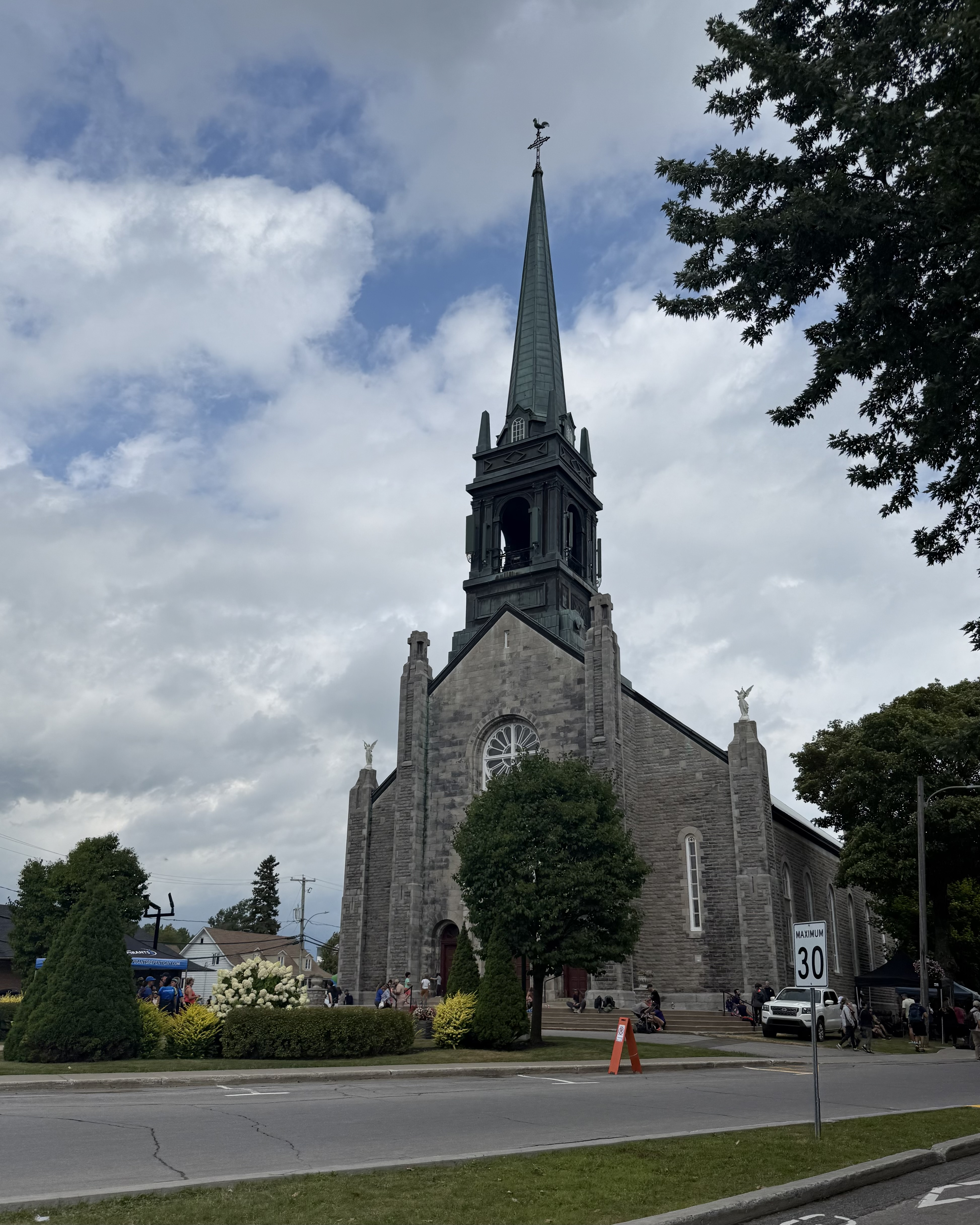
- Church of Saint-Esprit

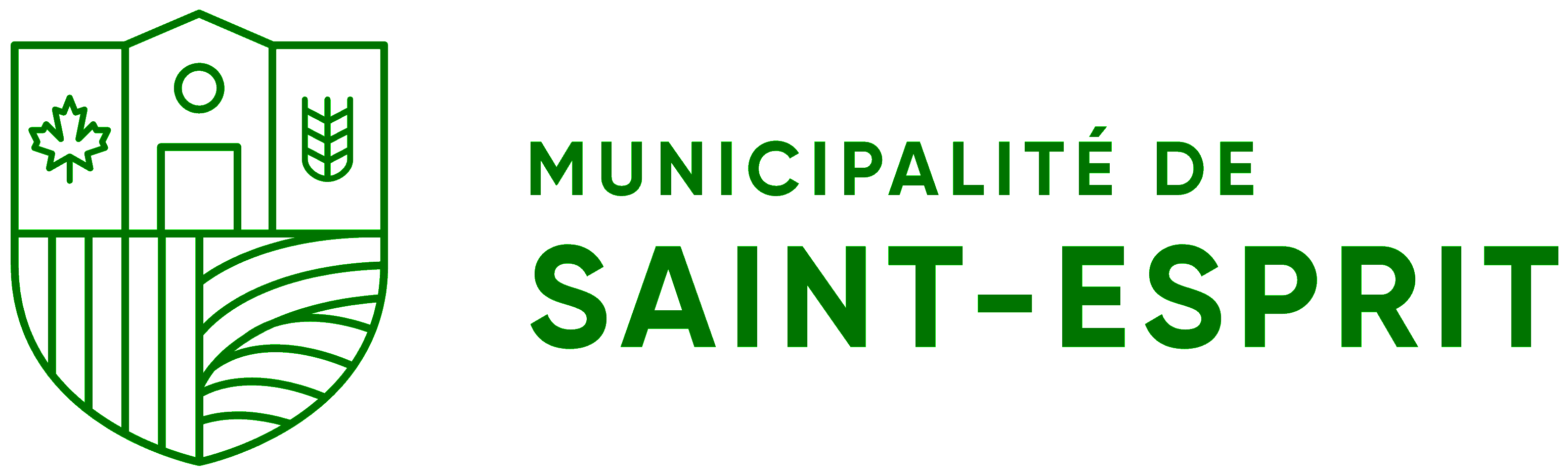
- Coat of arms

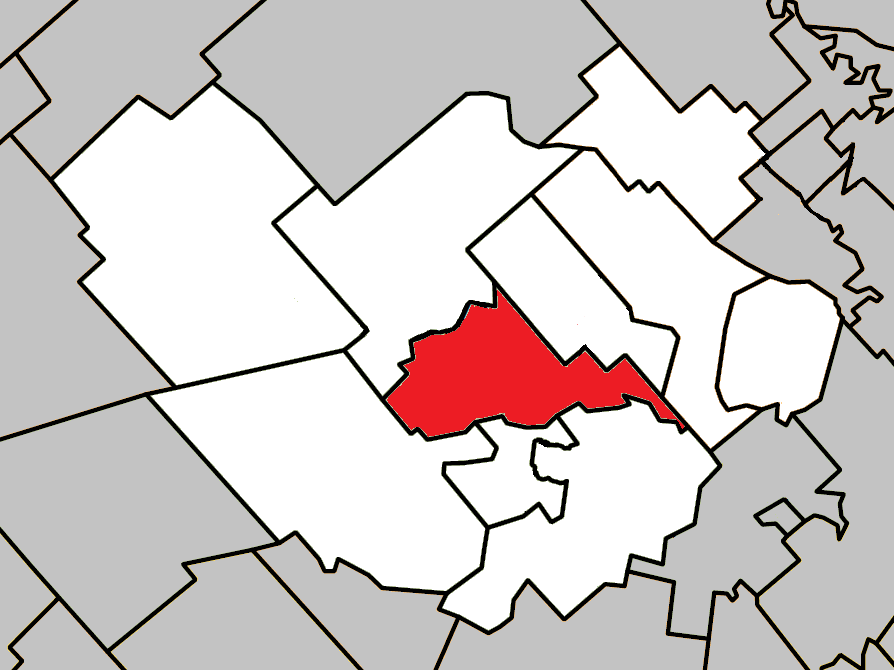
- Location within Montcalm RCM

- Location in central Quebec
- Coordinates: 45°54′N 73°40′W
- Country: Canada
- Province: Quebec
- Region: Lanaudière
- RCM: Montcalm
- Settled: 1790s
- Constituted: July 1, 1855

Government
  - Mayor: Germain Majeau
  - Fed. riding: Montcalm
  - Prov. riding: Rousseau

Area
  - Total: 54.63 km^{2} (21.09 sq mi)
  - Land: 54.19 km^{2} (20.92 sq mi)

Population (2021)
  - Total: 2,011
  - Density: 37.1/km^{2} (96/sq mi)
  - Pop (2016–21): ▲2.2%
  - Dwellings: 933
- Time zone: UTC−5 (EST)
  - Summer (DST): UTC−4 (EDT)
- Postal code(s): J0K 2L0
- Area codes: 450, 579
- Highways A-25: R-125; R-158; R-341
- Website: www.saint-esprit.ca/cms/

Saint-Esprit (French pronunciation: [sɛ̃t‿ɛspʁi], "Holy Spirit") is a municipality in the Lanaudière region of Quebec, Canada, part of the Montcalm Regional County Municipality. It is located on both banks of the Saint-Esprit River, a tributary of the L'Assomption River.

== History ==
The area's first settlers arrived at the end of 18th century and were mostly from L'Ange-Gardien, Beauport, and Saint-Sulpice. Originally, the area was identified as the Rivière-Saint-Esprit or Grand-Saint-Esprit Concession. In 1808, the Parish of Saint-Ours-du-Saint-Esprit was founded, however after 1838, the parish name was shortened to just Saint-Esprit to avoid confusion with another parish called Saint-Ours in the Diocese of Montreal.

In 1852, its post office opened and in 1855, the Parish Municipality of Saint-Ours-du-Saint-Esprit was formed. A century later in 1956, it followed the parish by also shortening its name to Saint-Esprit. In 2000, the parish municipality changed its status and became the Municipality of Saint-Esprit.

== Demographics ==
Historical census populations – Saint-Esprit, Quebec

Year	Pop.	±%
1861	1,820	—
1871	1,537	−15.5%
1881	1,685	+9.6%
1891	1,419	−15.8%
1901	1,392	−1.9%
1911	1,401	+0.6%
1921	1,504	+7.4%
1931	1,508	+0.3%

Year	Pop.	±%
1941	1,556	+3.2%
1951	1,542	−0.9%
1956	1,650	+7.0%
1961	1,678	+1.7%
1966	1,688	+0.6%
1971	1,754	+3.9%
1976	1,741	−0.7%
1981	1,809	+3.9%

Year	Pop.	±%
1986	1,774	−1.9%
1991	1,845	+4.0%
1996	1,908	+3.4%
2001	1,850	−3.0%
2006	1,868	+1.0%
2011	1,963	+5.1%
2016	1,967	+0.2%
2021	2,011	+2.2%

Source: Statistics Canada

Private dwellings occupied by usual residents (2021): 900 (total dwellings: 933)

Mother tongue (2021):

- English as first language: 0.7%
- French as first language: 96.3%
- English and French as first languages: 0.7%
- Other as first language: 2.2%

== Economy ==
Because Saint-Esprit is surrounded by extensive plains, the local economy is characterized by agriculture. The main agricultural activities include tobacco and Sugar Maple cultivation, milk production, and breeding of lamb, pork and poultry.

Saint-Esprit also has an industrial park along Highway 25.

== Education ==
Commission scolaire des Samares operates francophone public schools, including:

- École Dominique-Savio

The Sir Wilfrid Laurier School Board operates anglophone public schools, including:

- Joliette Elementary School in Saint-Charles-Borromée
- Joliette High School in Joliette
