= Sieur de Laviolette =

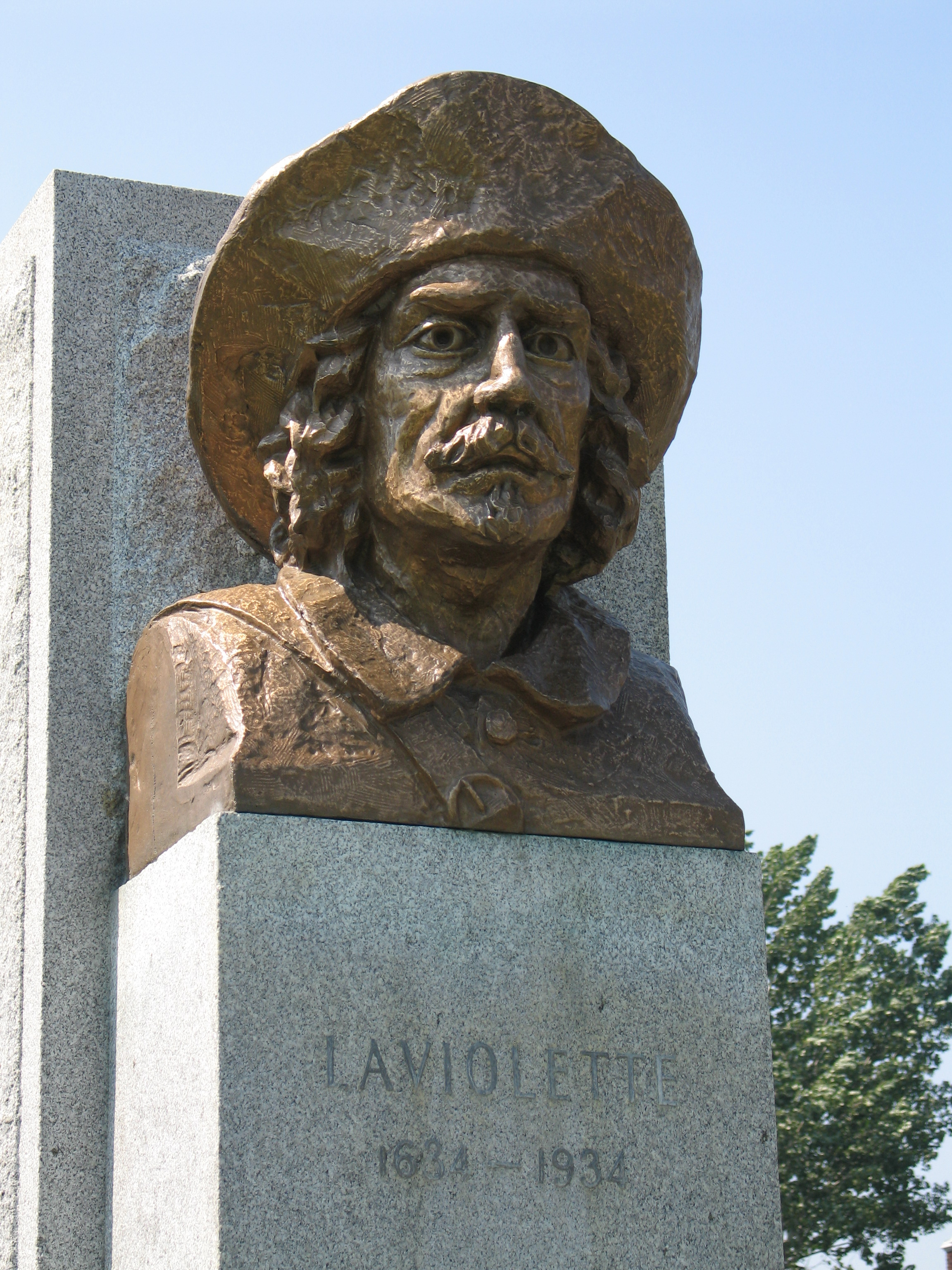
The Sieur of Laviolette, founder of Trois-Rivières. The Laviolette Bridge is his namesake.

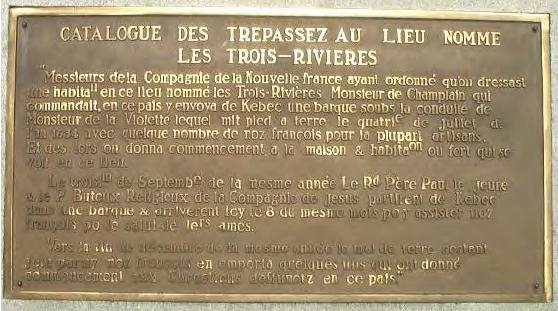
Plaque - The Sieur of Laviolette, founder of Trois-Rivières à Trois-Rivières.

The Sieur de Laviolette was the first commander of Trois-Rivières, a Canadian city in Central Quebec.

== Background ==
The area of Trois-Rivières (Three Rivers), located on the St Lawrence River at the mouth of the St. Maurice River, was first explored by Jacques Cartier on 7 October 1535, on his return from Hochelaga. Around 1600, François Gravé Du Pont, of Tadoussac, went there to trade with the Indians. Samuel de Champlain first visited the area, accompanied by Gravé Du Pont, in 1603.

== History ==
Champlain recognized the economic and strategic benefits of the location. In 1632, Trois-Rivières was designated for the annual meeting of Indians and fur traders.

In 1634, he sent Laviolette to strengthen the fur trade network and establish a trading post. Laviolette and a few soldiers built a fence, inside which some houses were erected to serve as housing and shops. The same year, the Jesuits Paul Le Jeune and Jacques Buteux established a permanent mission. Laviolette was commander at Trois-Rivières until April 17, 1636.

Laviolette Bridge is named in his honor.
