= Charron Island =

Island in Quebec, Canada

Charron
Native name: Île Charron
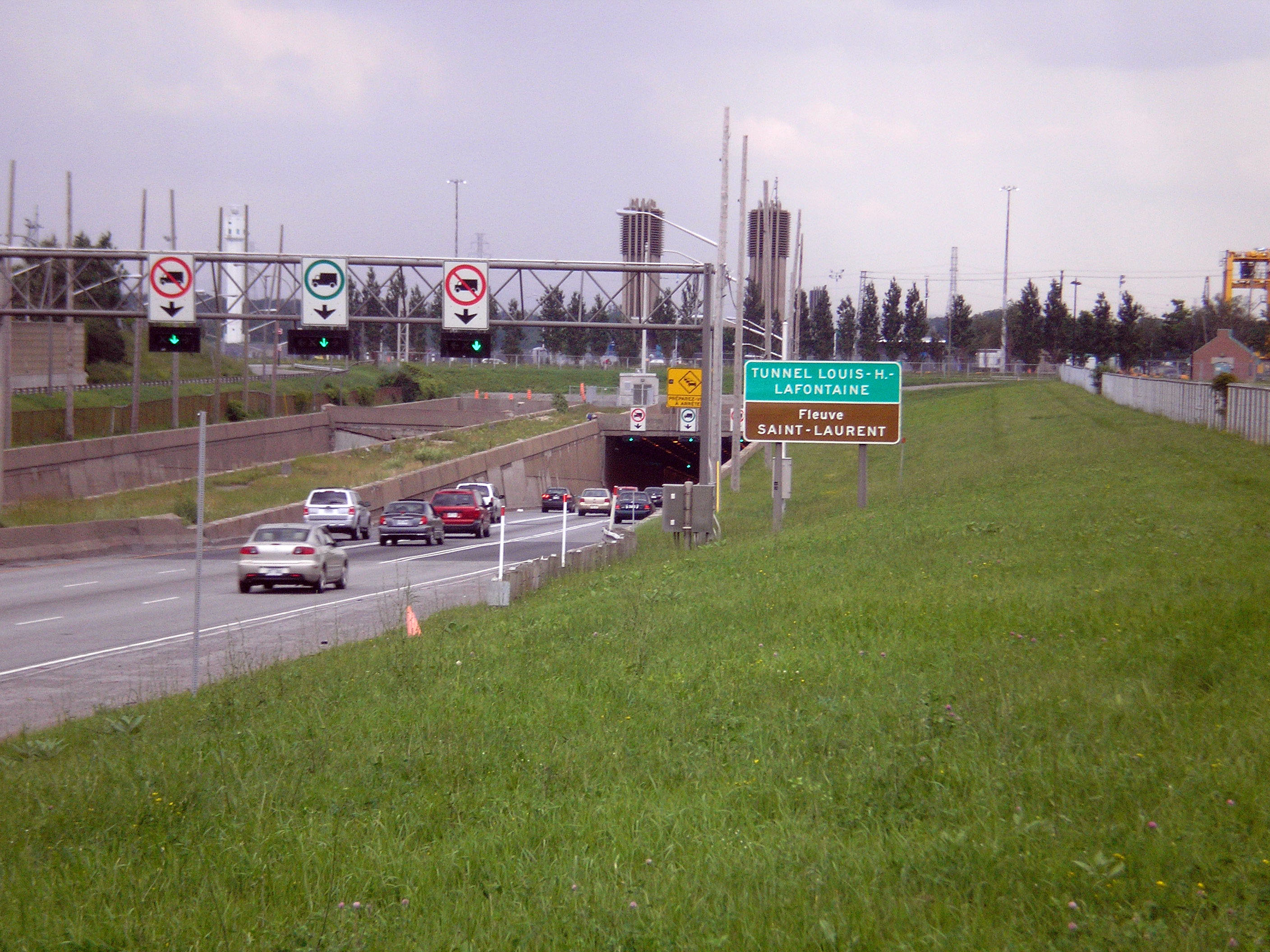
- Montreal side of Lafontaine Tunnel, leading to Charron Island.

- Location within Quebec

Geography
- Location: Saint Lawrence River
- Coordinates: 45.585212°N 73.482335°W
- Archipelago: Îles de Boucherville

Administration
- Canada

Demographics
- Population: 0

Additional information
- Official website: gouverneur-ile-charron.com
- Accessible by Quebec Autoroute 25 (exit 1)

Charron Island (French: Île Charron) is an island in the Saint Lawrence River, the westernmost of the Îles de Boucherville archipelago, near Îles-de-Boucherville National Park to the northeast of Montreal. It is part of the city of Longueuil, and is connected to the mainland and the Island of Montreal by the Louis-Hippolyte Lafontaine Bridge–Tunnel which carries Quebec Autoroute 25 and the Trans-Canada Highway.

== History ==
In 1672, Louis XIV of France ceded Charron Island (then called "Île Notre-Dame") to governor of Trois-Rivières René Gaultier, who became seigneur of Varennes. When signing the concession act, intendant Jean Talon annexed the island to the fief Du Tremblay. In 1689, Gaultier's wife (the daughter of Pierre Boucher) ceded the island to their daughter Madeleine Le-Villier, and the island came to be called Île Madeleine.

From 1690 to 1753, the island changed hands several times. First sold to Louis Lamoureux, it was then acquired three years later by Prudent Bougret dit Dufort, causing the name to change to Île Dufort. Then, by marrying Marie-Joseph Lamoureux, daughter of Louis Lamoureux, François Charron inherited half the island, and the western part went to the Jesuits.

In 1815, the Lower Canada general surveyor Joseph Bouchette listed the island on one of his maps as Île Charron, but the name became official only in 1950, being interchangeably called Île Dufort and Île Charron before that.

On March 11, 1967, the opening of Louis-Hippolyte Lafontaine Bridge-Tunnel took the island out of its isolation by providing a direct link to the cities of Montreal and Longueuil, and a four-star hotel was subsequently built. Charron Island also became the main access road to the Îles de Boucherville archipelago. The earthwork involved in building the bridge resulted in Charron and nearby Sainte-Marguerite Island becoming virtually a single island.

In 1984, Îles-de-Boucherville National Park was created to encompass most of the archipelago, stopping at the former Sainte-Marguerite Island channel. Five years later the Government of Quebec bought from the Society of Jesus the rest of the Island that they still owned for 30,000 dollars, and later ceded the island to the city of Longueuil for the purpose of creating a park and green space.

== Controversy ==
In 1988, Desjardins Financial Security acquired a substantial portion of Charron Island. The next year, the city of Longueuil signed an agreement with the financial group to build a housing project of 2,500 units; the construction would be performed by a subsidiary of Lavalin. The project involved the construction of buildings on an area of 22 hectares, much of which is covered by a forest of cottonwood, red ash, black willow and American elm.

In response to this project, an association of citizens was formed to protect the island and managed to stop the progress of the project. Only three buildings currently exist on Île Charron, the Hôtel Gouverneur, St-Laurent water treatment plant, and a summer theatre. According to André Porlier, Director General of the Conseil régional de l'environnement de Montréal, "the scarcity of forested areas in the St. Lawrence corridor, Charron Island provides a great potential as a haven for migratory and nesting birds". The current owner of the land coveted by developers is Luc Poirier, but there are ongoing talks between the Government of Quebec and the Desjardins Group.

== See also ==
- Parcours Île Charron disc golf course
- Hochelaga Archipelago
- Îles-de-Boucherville National Park
- Longueuil
- Louis Hippolyte Lafontaine Tunnel
