= Îles-de-Boucherville National Park =

Provincial park in Quebec, Canada

- Boucherville Islands National Park; Parc national des Îles-de-Boucherville
- IUCN category II (national park)
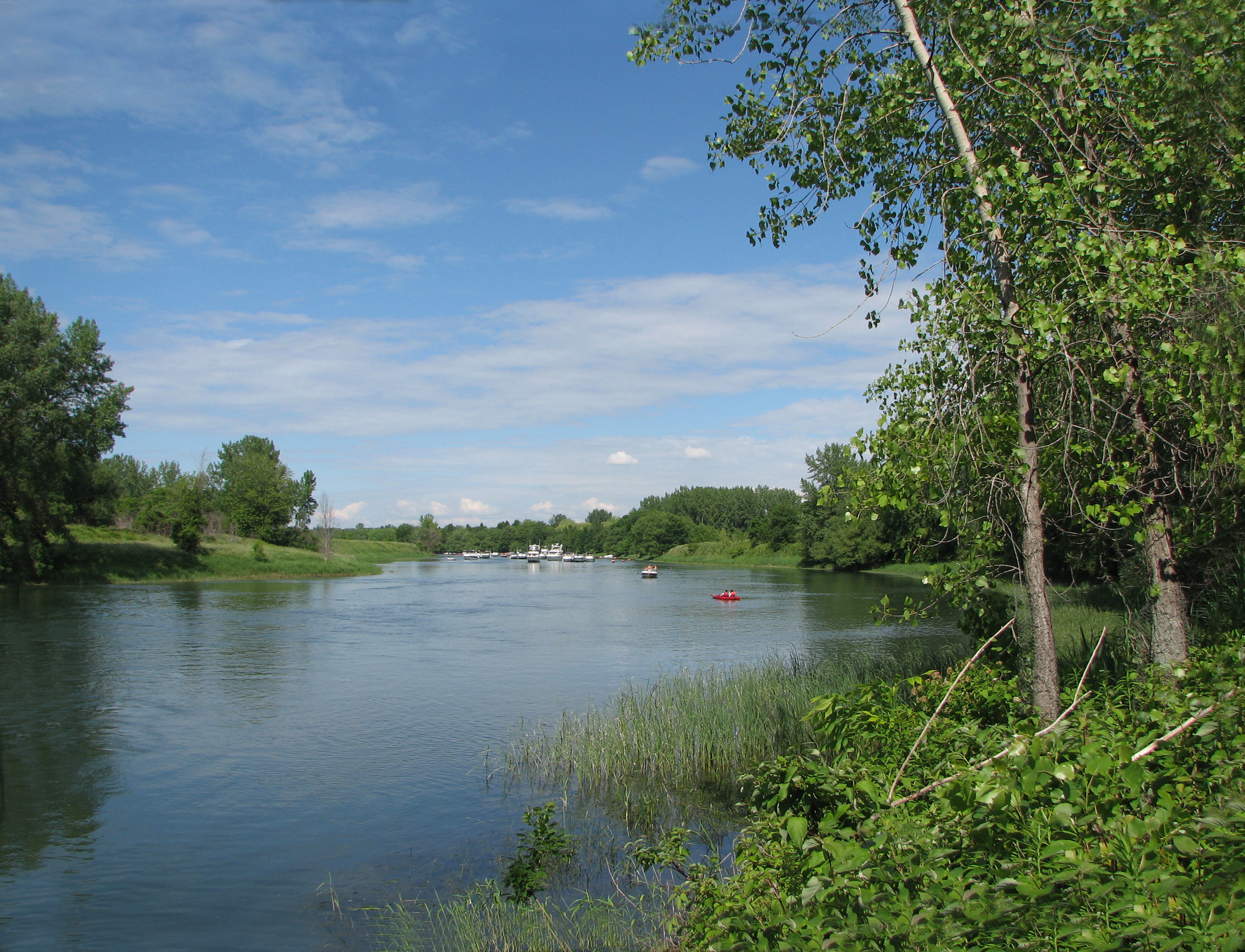
- A canal separating two islands in the Îles-de-Boucherville National Park

- Location within Greater Montreal
- Interactive map of Îles-de-Boucherville National Park
- Location: South Shore of Montreal, Quebec, Canada
- Nearest city: Boucherville; Longueuil; Montreal
- Coordinates: 45°36′45″N 73°28′10″W
- Area: 8.14 km^{2} (3.14 sq mi)
- Established: 12 September 1984
- Visitors: 295,000
- Governing body: Société des établissements de plein air du Québec (Sépaq)

The Îles-de-Boucherville National Park (Note: All provincial parks in Quebec use the term "national park", but there is no connection to the Canadian federal national park system, administered by Parks Canada.) is a provincial park along the St. Lawrence River in the province of Quebec.

Located on the South Shore of Montreal, near the suburb of Boucherville, the park comprises a handful of islands dotted with wetlands, bike paths, kayak circuits, cross-country ski trails, and public golf courses. Wildlife can be readily observed in all seasons, including the white-tailed deer, red fox, and the grey squirrel.

Formerly used as agricultural land, the islands were targeted for real-estate development in the 1970s, prompting the provincial government to acquire the islands and create the park in 1984. Since 1999, it has been administered by the Société des établissements de plein air du Québec (Sépaq), which manages several Quebec parks and wildlife refuges.

== Toponymy ==
The Boucherville Islands have gone by several different names throughout their history. At the time of the establishment of the seigneury encompassing the territory of the islands in 1664, they were known as the Percées Islands (îles-Percées). In the 18th century, owing to the presence of a commune on the islands, the name Common Isle (Isle Commune) came into use. It was only in 1858 that the modern-day name first appeared on a map, though only in its English form of Boucherville Islands. Its French version, Îles-de-Boucherville, was eventually adopted in the 20th century, and the islands have remained under that name ever since.

The name Boucherville was taken from the town of the same name located just 400 metres from the islands, itself named after the man who was granted the seigneury, Pierre Boucher. Boucher, one of the most respected Canadians of his time, was a jack-of-all-trades, having served at different times as a soldier, an interpreter, a linguist, a judge, a municipal governor, a civil and criminal lieutenant, a pioneer, and an urban planner.

== History ==
Evidence of human occupation of the islands dates as far back as 500 BCE. Until around 1500 CE, the St. Lawrence Iroquoians used Île Grosbois as a seasonal hunting ground. Following the arrival of Europeans on the continent, the islands became part of New France and were offered to Pierre Boucher in 1664 as part of his acquisition of the seigneury of Boucherville. They were then used as agricultural land.

In the 19th century, Île Charron and Île Sainte-Marguerite were used as vacationing spots, the latter of which was purchased in 1810 by prominent businessman John Molson, founder of the Molson Brewery. Molson constructed a property on the island, eventually dying there in 1836.

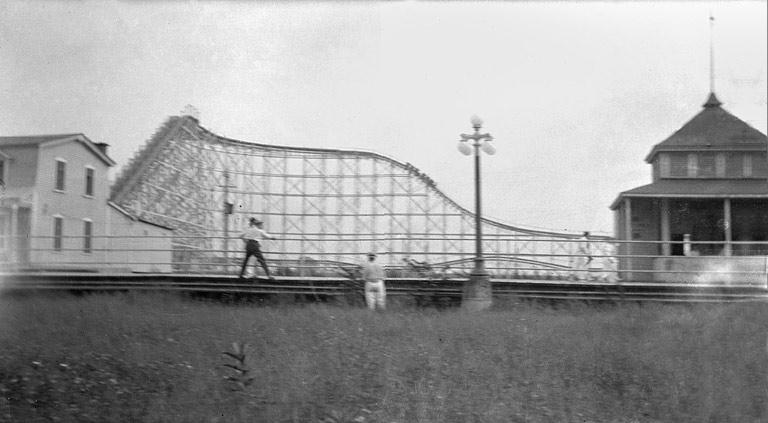
Roller coaster on King Edward Park, circa 1910.

In 1910, an amusement park named after the recently deceased King Edward opened up on Île Grosbois, only accessible by boat. In the summer, it offered rides, kiosks, dance halls, a racetrack for horse racing, roller coasters, and carousels. In the winter, meanwhile, it offered horse-drawn carriage rides. The same year of its opening, the park hosted Canada's first aviation competition, attracting noted aviators Jacques de Lesseps, who used the park to build and repair airplanes, and Louis Blériot, who ran test flights on the island. In 1928, the collapse of a pier killed several people, spelling the beginning of the end for the park. Competition from Montreal's other amusement parks, namely Dominion Park and Belmont Park, eventually caused the closure of King Edward Park in 1928.

In 1967, the islands finally became accessible by road following the construction of the Louis-Hippolyte Lafontaine Bridge–Tunnel. Amidst the ensuing conflict between real estate developers and environmental protection groups, the provincial government decided to purchase five of the Boucherville Islands in the mid-1970s for $7 million. Île Sainte-Marguerite underwent further development starting in 1981 in order to open it up to the public for recreational use. On September 12, 1984, the park officially opened and was inaugurated under the name of Parc de récréation des Îles-de-Boucherville (Boucherville Islands Recreational Park). When it was designated as a provincial park in 2001, its name was changed to its current form, Parc national des Îles-de-Boucherville.

A golf course opened up on Île à Pinard in 1991.

In January 2007, a real-estate developer purchased 20.6 hectares of land on Île Charron and began drawing up plans to build apartment towers on the site. Following fierce public opposition, the Quebec government expropriated the plot of land in November of that same year, turning it into a public reserve and forestalling construction for at least two years in doing so. Quebec would later go on to purchase those same 20.6 hectares in 2011 for $15 million and annex the newly acquired land to the Îles-de-Boucherville National Park.

In 2010, Sépaq announced that it intended to desist entirely from agriculture, opting instead to reforest the fields or leave them fallow, as the case may be.

== Administration ==
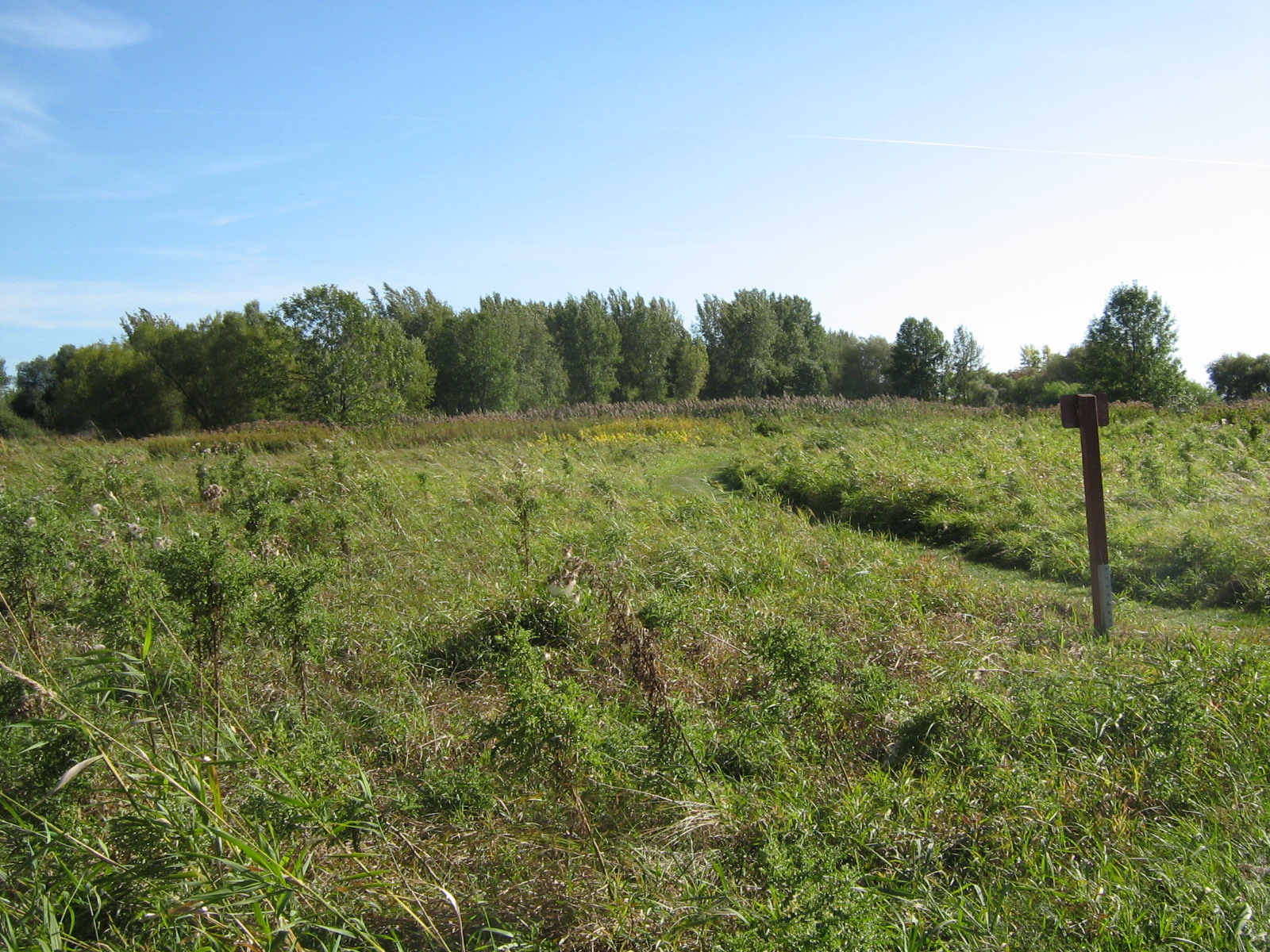
Trail on the Île-aux-Raisins.

As with most national parks in Quebec, (Note: With the exception of the Pingualuit and Kuururjuaq parks, which are administered by Parcs Nunavik) the Îles-de-Boucherville National Park has been administered by the Société des établissements de plein air du Québec (Sépaq) since 1999. Sépaq is in charge of the gamut of activities and services offered, as well as the protection and development of the parks. Due to its status as a Category II protected area, the extraction of natural resources for economic purposes such as forestry, mining, and energy, is prohibited. This includes the passage of oil pipelines, gas pipelines, and power transmission lines, with the exception of existing equipment. Hunting and trapping are also prohibited.

The park's administrative centre is located inside the park. The same building also administers the Parc national du Mont-Saint-Bruno, which is located about ten kilometres to the east.

== Geography ==
Map of Îles-de-Boucherville National Park.

The national park covers an area of 8.14 km^{2} and forms part of the Hochelaga Archipelago. It includes eleven islands, collectively termed the Boucherville Islands:

- Île Charron
- Île de la Commune
- Île Dufault
- Île Grosbois
- Île Lafontaine
- Île Montbrun
- Île à Pinard
- Île Saint-Jean
- Île Sainte-Marguerite
- Île Tourte Blanche
- Île aux Raisins

The park, accessible via Autoroute 25, is located entirely within the official city limits of Boucherville, which itself is part of the urban agglomeration of Longueuil, just outside Montreal. The park is also accessible in summer via river shuttle and in winter by snowshoe and ski across the frozen river, when the thickness of the ice permits. Pine trees are planted on the river when the ice is safe enough to cross and removed when it poses a danger.

== Geology ==
The park's schist subsurface is composed of calcareous Utica Shale from the middle and late Ordovician period. The low-relief islands are composed of marine clay left by the retreat of the Champlain Sea 12,000 years ago and shaped by the Saint Lawrence river.

== Hydrography ==
The Boucherville Islands are located in the Saint Lawrence river and are separated by numerous channels, the largest of which are the Grande Rivière and La Passe channels. Since the islands are low-lying, they are subject to spring flooding, with Île aux Raisins and Île Saint-Jean completely flooding in the spring.

== Climate ==
The climate of the park is similar to that of nearby Montreal, with only slight comparative differences. Most notably, springs are a little cooler, as warming is slowed down by the presence of ice on the river and the shade provided by evergreen trees. The autumn is also more temperate. As in Montreal, the temperature range throughout the year is significant, with the coldest months reaching -20C and the hottest months reaching +30C.

Precipitation is abundant throughout the year, including snow, which falls from November to May. The park receives approximately 220 cm of snow per year. However, the snow cover is relatively low, with an average of only 33 cm in February, compared to over 50 in Montreal. The cold wind blows strongly during the winter season.

== Ecology ==
=== Ecoregions ===
The park is located in the Great Lakes–St. Lawrence Lowlands ecoregion, characterized by mixedwood forests with sugar maple, yellow birch, eastern hemlock and eastern white pine trees.

=== Flora ===
More than 450 plant species can be found in the park, seven of which are considered to be at-risk species: the dragon tree, the shagbark hickory, the Virginia claytonia, the rough bugleweed, the white walnut, the bloodroot, and the sand violet. The flora of the islands is representative of riparian zones. In terrestrial areas, owing to the past development of the archipelago, fallow agricultural land is predominant. However, the park still contains a few wooded areas, namely the Grosbois woodland, which is composed of red ash and silver maple trees. Aquatic areas, meanwhile, are dominated by willows, poplars, dogwoods, and staghorn sumacs.

=== Fauna ===
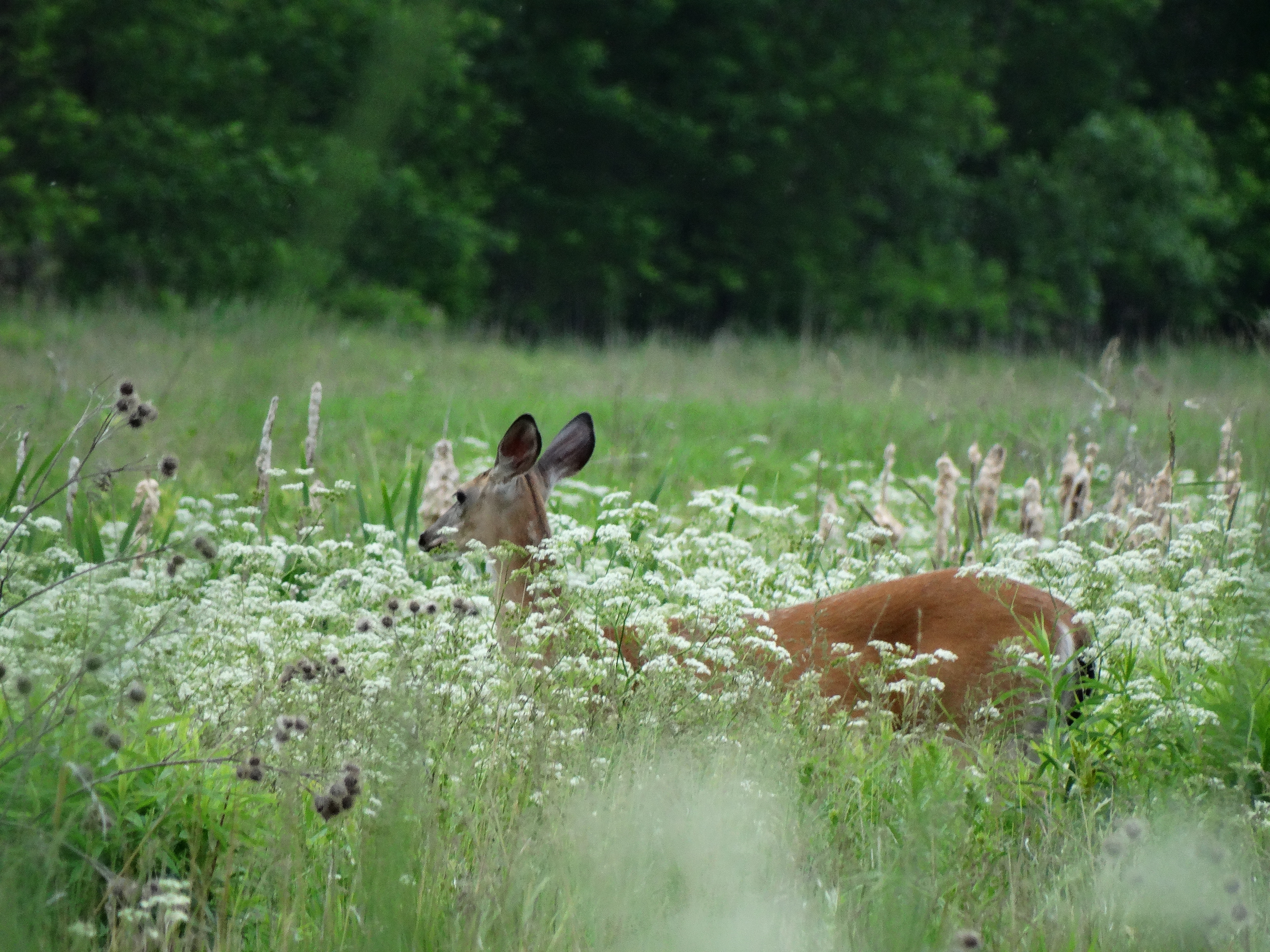
White-tailed deer spotted in the Îles-de-Boucherville National Park

The park includes twenty species of mammal, including the white-tailed deer, the red fox, the striped skunk, the raccoon, the groundhog, the American mink, the eastern grey squirrel, the muskrat, the field mouse, and the North American beaver. Four of the park's animal species are considered to be at-risk: the silver-haired bat, the hoary bat, the eastern red bat, and the tricolored bat. By contrast, the deer is considered to be overabundant in the park, engendering substantial negative impacts on the flora of the park, the regeneration of the forest, the transmission of diseases, including Lyme disease, and road collisions.

Bird life in the park is much richer and diverse in comparison, with over 240 species present. Among these species, the Barrow's goldeneye, the horned grebe, the least bittern, the bald eagle, the golden eagle, the peregrine falcon, the Caspian tern, the short-eared owl, the grass wren, the Bicknell's thrush, the common nighthawk, and the chimney swift are considered at risk.

Six species of reptile, including three species of snake and three of turtle, can be found in the park. Among these are the snapping turtle, the painted turtle, the map turtle, the garter snake, the common watersnake, and the brown snake. The map turtle, the water snake and the brown snake are considered at risk.

Species of frog include the mudpuppy, the American toad, the leopard frog, the green frog, and the American bullfrog.

There are 45 species of fish in the park, four of which are considered at risk: the American eel, the lake sturgeon, the black sturgeon and the bridle shiner.

== Tourism ==
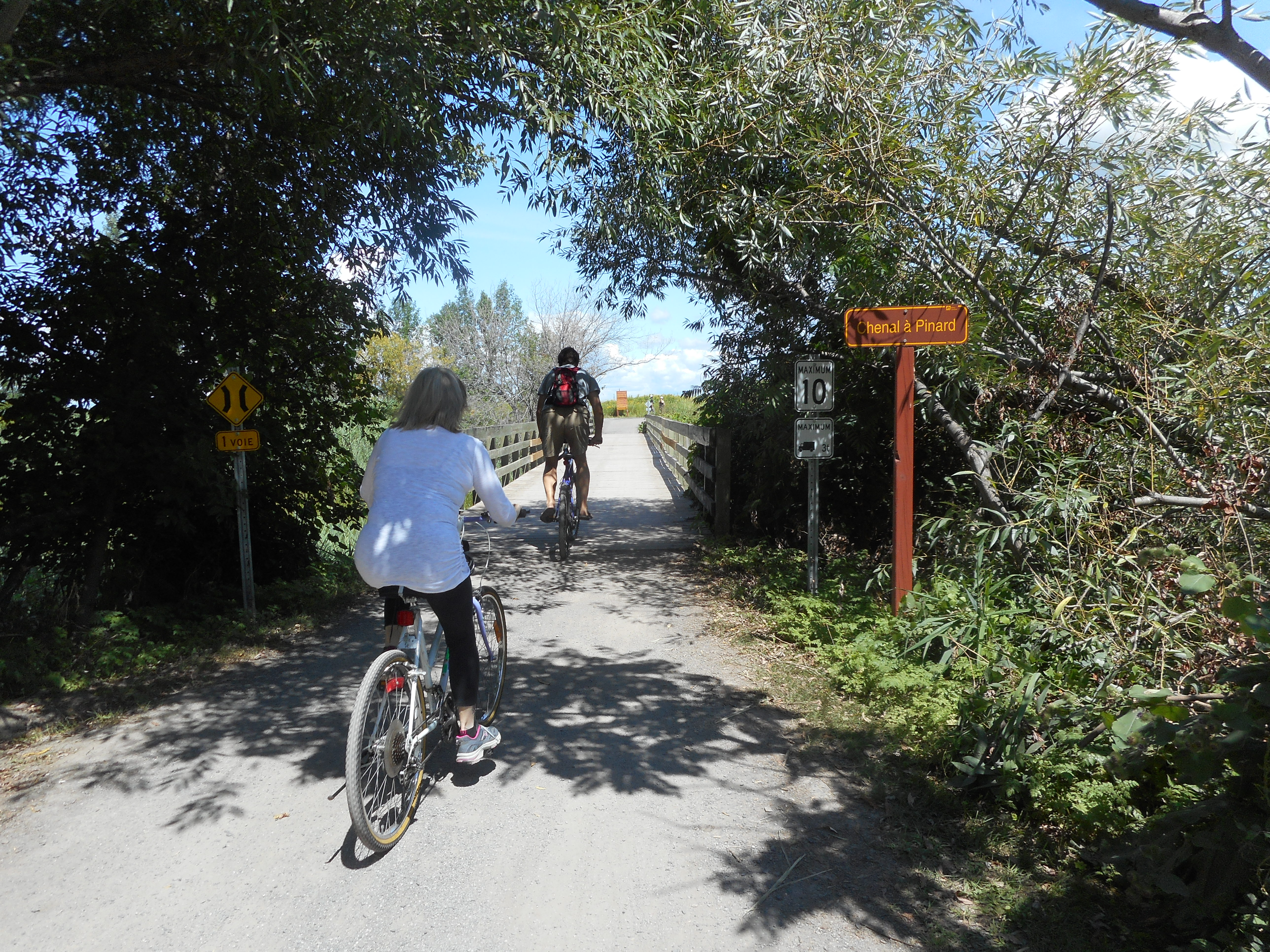
Bike path on Île Pinard

Each year, the park is visited by 295,000 people on average. Though it's accessible year-round, its river shuttles are out of service for the winter months, from October to May. Only Île Sainte-Marguerite is accessible by road during the winter. The park has a campground equipped with 25 tents, as well as fifty unserviced campsites.

In the summer, it is possible to go biking, canoeing, kayaking, hiking, and to play beach volleyball. The park has about 20 km of hiking and cycling trails. In the winter, available activities include snowshoeing, cross-country skiing, hiking, and kicksledding.

The Boucherville Islands are one of the only national parks in Quebec with a golf course on its territory. Golf des Îles, which is located on Île Pinard, is an 18-hole course with a length of 5,720 yards (5,230 m) and a par difficulty of 70.

== See also ==
- Charron Island
- Hochelaga Archipelago
- Montreal Archipelago Ecological Park
- List of islands of Quebec
