= Louis-Hippolyte-La Fontaine Bridge–Tunnel =

Bridge–tunnel in Quebec

Coordinates: 45°34′46″N 73°28′46″W

Louis-Hippolyte Lafontaine Bridge–Tunnel
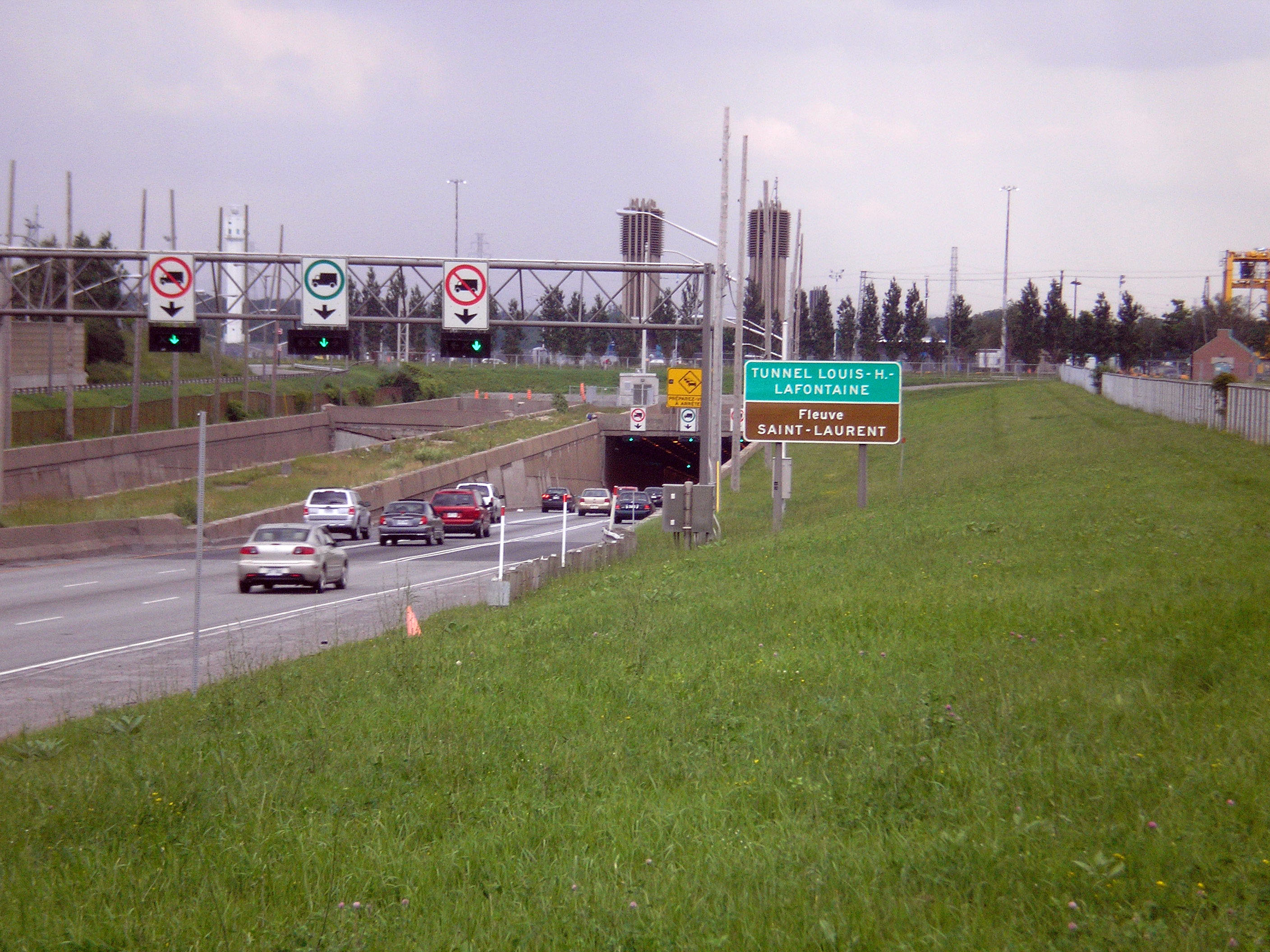
- Montreal entrance to tunnel, 2009
- Interactive map of Louis-Hippolyte Lafontaine Bridge–Tunnel

Overview
- Location: Montreal, Quebec, Canada
- Route: A-25 (TCH)
- Crosses: St. Lawrence River

Operation
- Opened: March 11, 1967; 59 years ago
- Traffic: 120,000
- Character: Limited access highway

Technical
- Length: 1,391 m (4,563.6 ft) (tunnel section); 409 m (1,341.9 ft) (causeway section)
- No. of lanes: 6
- Tunnel clearance: 4.4 m (14 ft 5 1/4 in)
- Width: 37 m (121.4 ft)
- Louis-Hippolyte-La Fontaine Bridge–Tunnel (Montreal)

The Louis-Hippolyte Lafontaine Bridge–Tunnel (French: Pont-Tunnel Louis-Hippolyte-La Fontaine) is a highway bridge–tunnel running over and beneath the Saint Lawrence River. It connects the Montreal borough of Mercier–Hochelaga-Maisonneuve with the south shore of the river at Longueuil, Quebec.

Named after Lower Canada political reformer Louis-Hippolyte Lafontaine, the Lafontaine Tunnel is an immersed tube structure, measuring 1,391 m (4,563.6 ft) long. It carries the Autoroute 25 expressway and passes beneath the main shipping channel in the Saint Lawrence River, immediately downstream from the Saint Lawrence Seaway. It surfaces on Île Charron (Îles de Boucherville at Exit 1 of Autoroute 25), then continues by bridge to Longueuil. The bridge-tunnel sees about 120,000 daily crossings, of which 13% are trucks. Construction began in 1963, and opening day was March 11, 1967.

== History ==
In 1960, the construction of the Trans-Canada Highway (TCH) through Quebec from the Ontario border to Rivière-du-Loup was announced. In Montreal, to avoid having to build a huge bridge that would have disfigured the city and destroyed a neighbourhood, engineers opted for the construction of a tunnel located under the Saint Lawrence River and dug a trench under the river bed and buried the tunnel sections 4.6 metres (15 ft) to 6.1 metres (20 ft) under the river bed.

The church in Longue-Pointe had to be demolished to make way for the tunnel, and 300 families were expropriated from the village in 1964. The construction was completed in March 1967, just before the opening of Expo 67. Construction cost $75 million.

A major four-year refurbishment of the tunnel began in 2020 was originally planned to be completed in 2024 at a cost of $1.2 billion, but in 2022, it was announced that the project would take a year longer than expected and that at its completion in 2025, it will have a total cost of $2.1 billion.

== Specifications ==
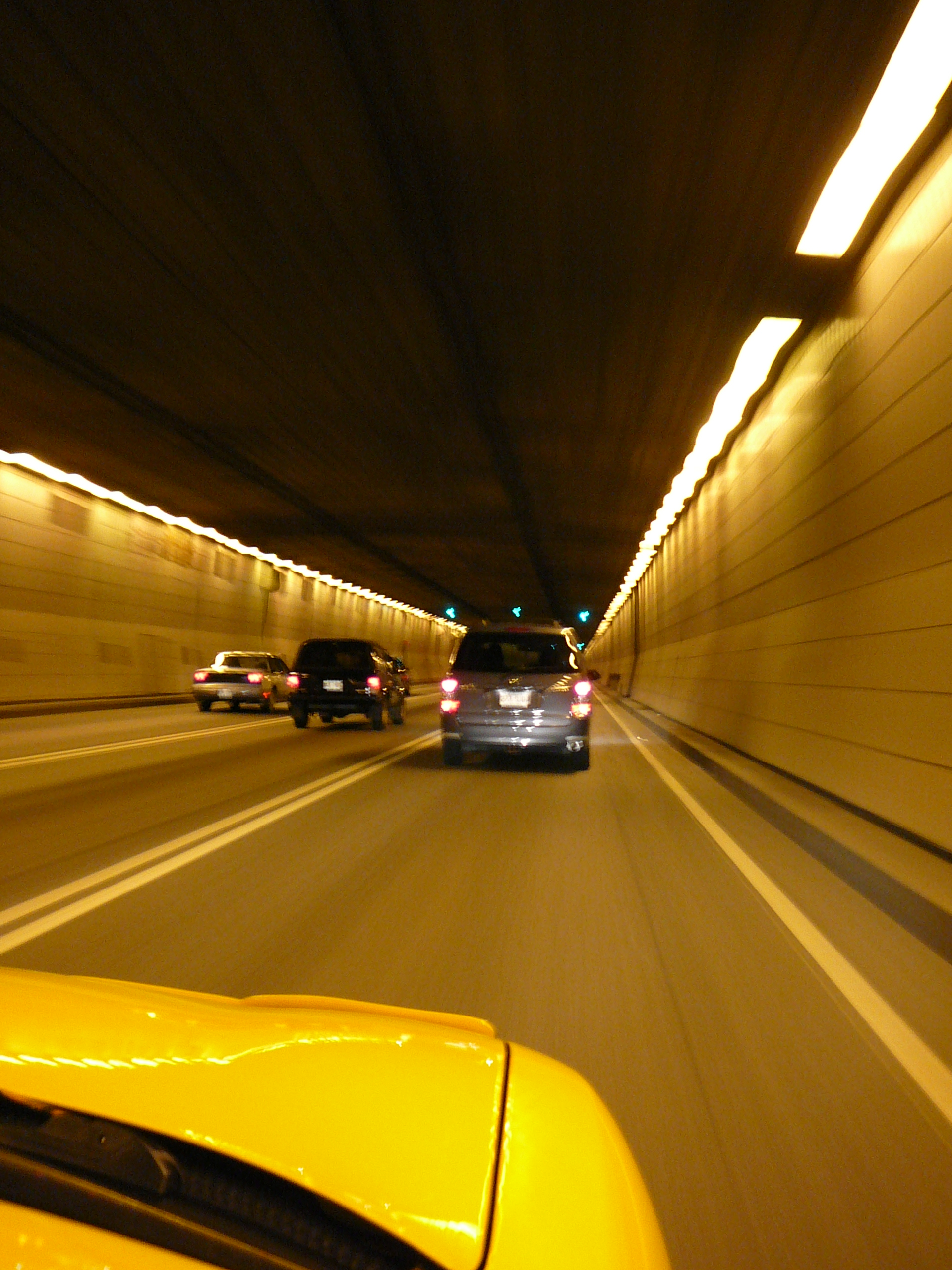
Inside the tunnel

Each of the seven tunnel sections weighs 32,000 t (31,000 long tons; 35,000 short tons) and is 110 metres (360 ft) long, 37 metres (121 ft) wide, and is 8 metres (26 ft) high. In total, the bridge–tunnel is 1.8 kilometres (1.1 mi) long.

The tunnel was built with sections prefabricated in dry dock and then sunk in the river 24 metres (79 ft) below the surface of the water.

It is one of the largest prestressed concrete structures in the world and is the longest bridge-tunnel in Canada.

== See also ==
- List of crossings of the Saint Lawrence River
- List of bridges in Canada
- List of bridges in Montreal
