= Quebec Autoroute 25 =

Highway in Quebec

Autoroute 25
- Route Transcanadienne
- Autoroute Louis-H.-La Fontaine

Route information
- Maintained by Transports Québec
- Length: 49.3 km (30.6 mi)
- Existed: 1967–present

Major junctions
- South end: A-20 (TCH) in Longueuil
- A-40 (TCH) in Montréal; A-440 in Laval; A-640 in Terrebonne
- North end: R-125 / R-158 in Saint-Esprit

Location
- Country: Canada
- Province: Quebec
- Major cities: Longueuil, Montreal, Laval, Terrebonne, Mascouche

Highway system
- Trans-Canada Highway; Quebec provincial highways; Autoroutes; List; Former
← A-20	→ A-30

Autoroute 25 (or A-25, also called Autoroute Louis-H.-La Fontaine in Montreal) is an Autoroute in the Lanaudière region of Quebec. It is currently 49 km (30.4 mi) long and services the direct north of Montreal's Metropolitan Area. A-25 has one toll bridge, which is the first modern toll in the Montreal area and one of two overall in Quebec (after being joined by the A-30 toll bridge, which opened in 2012).

A-25 begins at an interchange with A-20 and Route 132 in Longueuil and quickly enters the Louis Hippolyte Lafontaine Bridge-Tunnel into the east end of Montreal. It is the main north-south freeway in the east end of Montreal (actually northwest-southeast but perpendicular to the St. Lawrence River).

Before the Montreal-Laval Extension, a gap existed in A-25 north of the interchange with Autoroute 40. Instead it followed Boulevard Henri-Bourassa to Boulevard Pie-IX, both of which are principal urban arterial roads. Boulevard Pie-IX north of Boulevard Henri-Bourassa was used as a temporary section of Autoroute 25 across the Rivière-des-Prairies to Autoroute 440. From there, A-25 proceeded east with A-440, then continued north and east of Laval.

The designation of Autoroute Louis-Hippolyte-Lafontaine is named after Louis Hippolyte Lafontaine, a 19th-century Lower Canada leader of what was then the Province of Canada.

A-25 is also part of the Trans-Canada Highway between the A-20 and A-40 interchanges.

== History ==
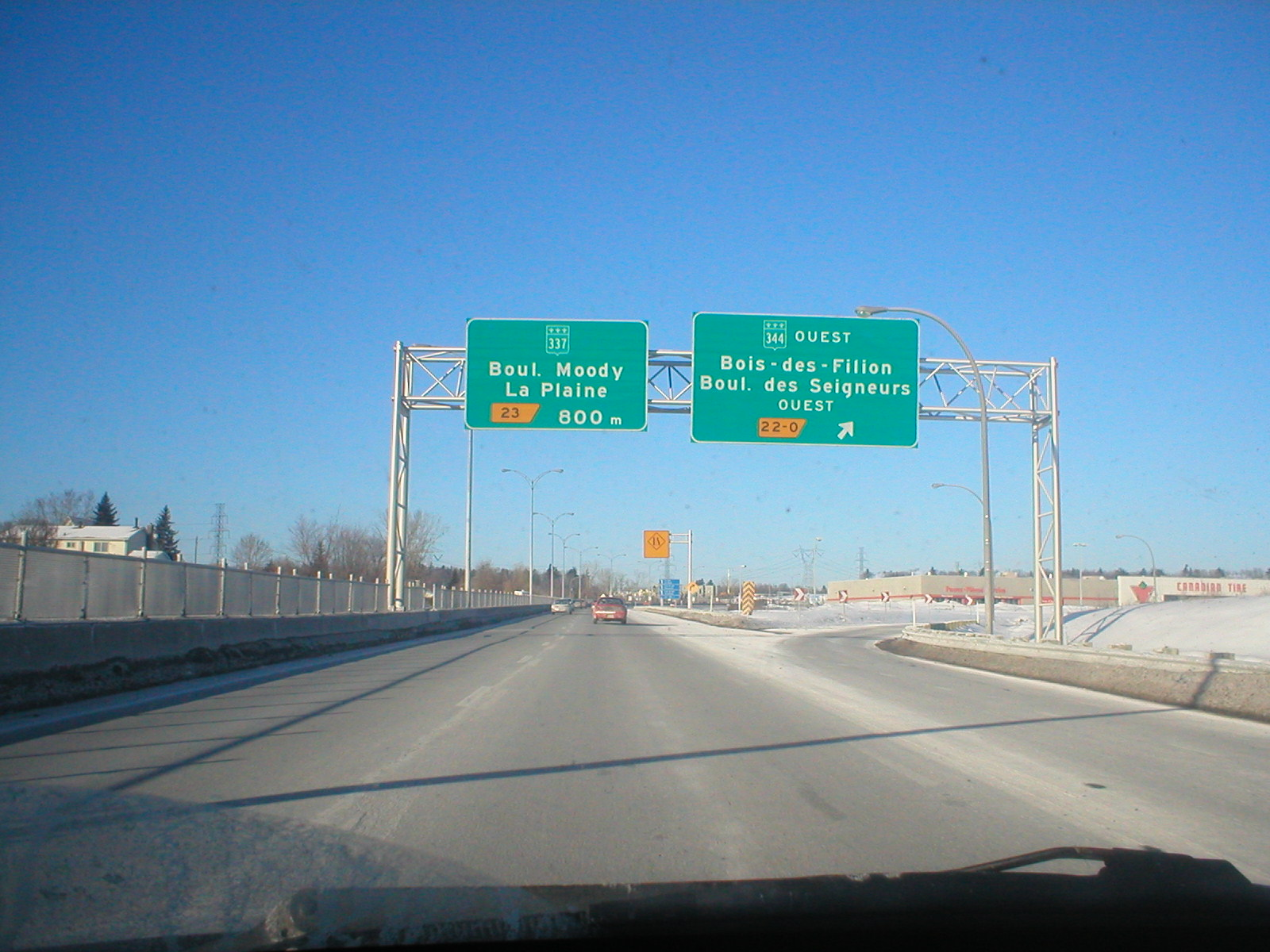
Autoroute 25 in Terrebonne

=== Construction history ===
Kilometre	Year	Notes
0 to 4	1967	Louis Hippolyte Lafontaine Bridge-Tunnel
4 to 7	1966	Avenue Souligny, Montreal to A-40/TCH, Montreal
7 to 10	2002	A-40/TCH, Montreal to Boulevard Henri-Bourassa, Montreal
10 to 17	2011	Boulevard Henri-Bourassa, Montreal to A-440, Laval
12 to 44	1971	From A-440, Laval to Chemin du Ruisseau Saint-Jean, Saint-Roch-Ouest
44 to 46	1999	Ruisseau Saint-Jean, Saint-Roch-Ouest to Rue Montcalm, Saint-Esprit
46 to end	2001	Rue Montcalm, Saint-Esprit to Route 125, Saint-Esprit

=== Montreal-Laval extension ===
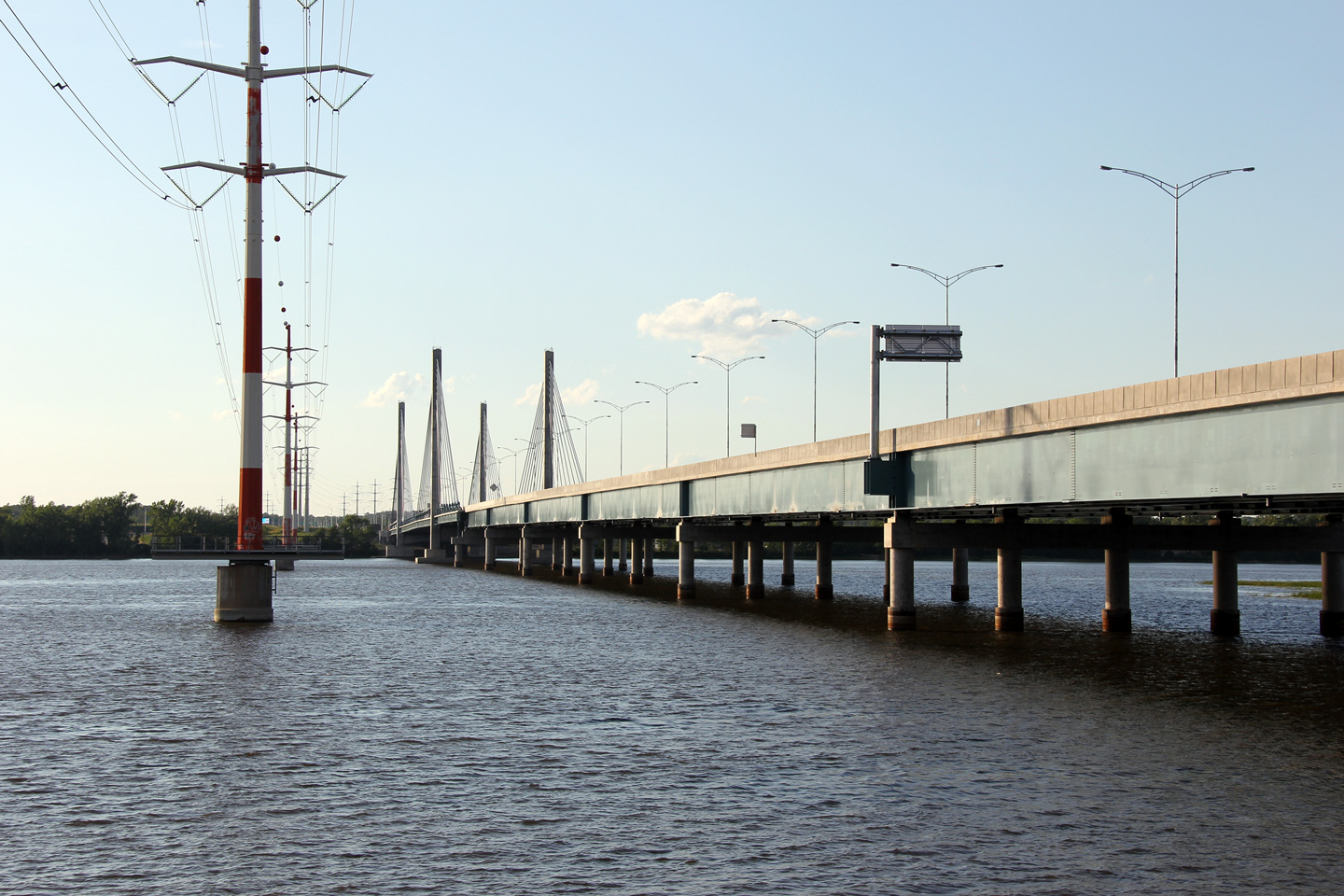
A-25 crosses the Rivière des Prairies by way of the Olivier-Charbonneau Bridge.

Autoroute 25 has been extended under a public-private partnership. The 7.2 km section of highway joins the southern part of Autoroute 25 at Boulevard Henri-Bourassa in Montreal's East end and the northern part at Laval's Autoroute 440. The $207-million project will save some $226 million for the province since a private consortium will assume any cost overruns. A toll bridge using a RFID transponder automatic payment system spans the Rivière des Prairies and costs transponder-owning motorists $3.20 per crossing at peak hours (6-9 AM and 3-6 PM) and $2.24 per crossing the rest of the day. An additional $5.34 in administration fees is charged for motorists without transponders. The road opened on May 21, 2011. The highway has six lanes (three in each direction), while the bridge features three lanes in each direction with one reserved for public transit.

Now that the link between Montreal and Laval is complete, the temporary autoroute section connecting Boulevard Pie-IX to Autoroute 440 lost its A-25 designation. The new route designation for this section is Route 125.

The new span effectively joins the North Shore, Laval, Montreal, and the South Shore.

Environmental organizations have raised concerns that the highway extension will lead to an influx of automobiles entering Montreal and increase development pressure on agricultural land in Eastern Laval.

== Exit list ==
RCM	Location	km	mi	Exit	Destinations	Notes
Longueuil	Boucherville	0.0– 0.4	0.0– 0.25	–	A-20 (TCH) east to A-30 – Québec, Sorel-Tracy, Aéroport Saint-Hubert	A-25 southern terminus; roadway and Trans-Canada Highway continue as A-20 east
Longueuil	Longueuil	0.0– 0.4	0.0– 0.25	90	A-20 west / R-132 to A-15 – Varennes, La Prairie, Aéroport P.-E.-Trudeau, USA	A-20 west exit 90; R-132 / A-20 east exit 89
Saint Lawrence River		0.4– 0.9	0.25– 0.56	Pont Louis-Hippolyte-La Fontaine		
Saint Lawrence River		1.1	0.68	1	Île Charron, Îles-de-Boucherville Park	
Saint Lawrence River		1.7– 3.1	1.1– 1.9	Tunnel Louis-Hippolyte-La Fontaine		
Montréal	Montréal	3.6– 3.4	2.2– 2.1	3	Rue Notre-Dame	Southbound exit
Montréal	Montréal	4.1– 4.7	2.5– 2.9	4	Montréal Centre-Ville	Access via Avenue Souligny; presently closed owing to construction work; exit 15-S on Avenue Souligny
Montréal	Montréal	5.4	3.4	5	Rue Sherbrooke (R-138) / Rue Hochelaga / Rue Notre-Dame	Signed as exits 5E (east) and 5O (west) northbound
Montréal	Montréal	5.4	3.4	5	Rue Beaubien / Boulevard Yves-Prévost	Northbound exit is via exit 5O
Montréal	Montréal	6.4	4.0	7	Boulevard Wilfrid-Pelletier / Boulevard Châteauneuf	Northbound exit
Montréal	Montréal	7.1	4.4	6	Rue Beaubien / Boulevard Yves-Prévost	Southbound exit
Montréal	Montréal	7.6– 8.5	4.7– 5.3	8	A-40 (TCH) – Trois-Rivières, Québec, Gatineau, Ottawa, Aéroport P.-E.-Trudeau, Aéroport Mirabel	Trans-Canada Highway follows A-40 west; signed as exits 8E (east) and 8O (west); A-40 exit 80
Montréal	Montréal	9.0	5.6	9	Rue Bombardier	Northbound exit
Montréal	Montréal	9.3	5.8	10	Boulevard Henri-Bourassa / Boulevard Perras / Boulevard Maurice-Duplessis	Northbound exit
Montréal	Montréal	11.5	7.1	9	Boulevard Henri-Bourassa / Rue Bombardier	Southbound exit
Montréal	Montréal	12.9	8.0	10	Boulevard Perras / Boulevard Maurice-Duplessis	Southbound exit
Rivière des Prairies		12.9– 14.2	8.0– 8.8	Pont Olivier-Charbonneau (tolled)		
Laval		14.3	8.9	14	Montée Masson (R-125) / Avenue Marcel Villeneuve / Boulevard Lévesque	No southbound signage for Route 125
Laval		15.5– 17.5	9.6– 10.9	16	A-440 west (Autoroute Jean-Noël-Lavoie)	Eastern terminus of A-440; exit 35 on A-440
Laval		19.8	12.3	20	Boulevard des Mille Îles	
Rivière des Mille Îles		20.1– 20.3	12.5– 12.6	Pont Lepage		
Rivière des Mille Îles		20.6	12.8	21	Île Saint-Jean	
Rivière des Mille Îles		21.0– 21.2	13.0– 13.2	Pont Mathieu		
Les Moulins	Terrebonne	21.5	13.4	22	R-344 (Boulevard des Seigneurs) – Terrebonne Centre-Ville	Northbound exit and southbound entrance; signed as exits 22E (east) and 22O (west)
Les Moulins	Terrebonne	22.3	13.9	23	R-337 (Boulevard Moody / Chemin Gascon) – Terrebonne Centre-Ville	
Les Moulins	Terrebonne	24.4	15.2	24	R-125 (Montée Masson) / Rue Grande-Allée	Southbound exit shares a ramp with exit 25
Les Moulins	Terrebonne - Mascouche boundary	25.5	15.8	25	A-640 to A-40 – Repentigny, Québec, Saint-Eustache, Mirabel Airport	A-640 exit 42
Les Moulins	Mascouche	26.4	16.4	25	Avenue de l'Esplanade	Standalone interchange that shares ramp with exit 25
Les Moulins	Mascouche	28.4	17.6	28	Chemin Sainte-Marie – Mascouche Centre-Ville	
Les Moulins	Mascouche	29.8	18.5	30	Chemin Saint-Pierre	
Les Moulins	Mascouche	34.3	21.3	34	Chemin Saint-Henri – L'Épiphanie	
Montcalm	Saint-Roch-de-l'Achigan	38.6	24.0	38	Rue Armand-Majeau	Northbound exit and entrance
Montcalm	Saint-Roch-de-l'Achigan	41.0	25.5	41	Rang du Ruisseau-des-Anges S	
Montcalm	Saint-Roch-Ouest	44.3	27.5	44	R-339 / R-125 south – Saint-Roch-de-l'Achigan	South end of R-125 unsigned concurrency
Montcalm	Saint-Esprit	47.3	29.4	46	R-158 west – Saint-Lin-Laurentides, Saint-Jérôme	South end of R-158 concurrency; A-25 becomes unsigned; R-125 becomes signed
Montcalm	Saint-Esprit	48.6	30.2	–	Rue Montcalm / Rang de la Rivière S	At-grade (traffic signals)
Montcalm	Saint-Esprit	49.3	30.6	–	R-125 north – Sainte-Julienne, Rawdon, Saint-Donat; R-158 east – Joliette, Saint-Jacques	A-25 northern terminus
1.000 mi = 1.609 km; 1.000 km = 0.621 mi: Concurrency terminus; Electronic toll collection; Incomplete access; Route transition

== See also ==
- Pie IX Bridge
- List of bridges spanning the Rivière des Prairies
- List of bridges spanning the Saint Lawrence River
- List of crossings of the Rivière des Mille Îles
- List of crossings of the Rivière des Prairies
- List of crossings of the Saint Lawrence River

Trans-Canada Highway
Previous route Autoroute 40	Autoroute 25	Next route Autoroute 20
