= Deglane =

Deglane is a surname. Notable people with the surname include:

- Henri Deglane (1902–1975), French wrestler
- Henri Deglane (architect) (1855-1931), French architect
