= Henri Deglane (architect) =

French architect (1855–1931)

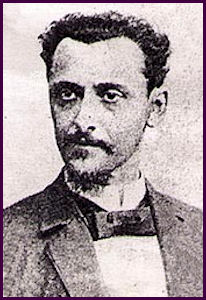
- Henri Deglane (c. 1900)
- Born: Henri Adolphe Auguste Deglane; December 10, 1855; Paris, France
- Died: May 13, 1931 (aged 75); Marquay, Dordogne, France
- Resting place: Montparnasse Cemetery, Paris
- Education: École des Beaux-Arts
- Occupation: Architect
- Awards: Prix de Rome (1881); Officer of the Legion of Honour (1900)
- Buildings: Grand Palais (nave and main façade); Palais de la République, Dakar; Villa Aigue-Marine, Royan

Henri Adolphe Auguste Deglane (Template:IPA-fr; 10 December 1855 – 13 May 1931) was a French architect and academic. He is best known as one of the chief designers of the Grand Palais in Paris, constructed for the 1900 Exposition Universelle, where he was responsible for the monumental main façade and the grand iron-and-glass central nave fronting what is now Avenue Winston-Churchill. Over the course of his career, he won the prestigious Prix de Rome in 1881, served as head of an architecture studio at the École des Beaux-Arts, and was elected to the Académie des Beaux-Arts in 1918.

== Biography ==
Deglane was born in the former 1st arrondissement of Paris on 10 December 1855. He studied architecture at the École des Beaux-Arts under the direction of Louis-Jules André. His first public exhibition was in 1880 at the Salon des Artistes Français, where he received a third-class medal.

In 1881, Deglane was awarded the premier Grand Prix de Rome in architecture for his design titled "A palace, circle of fine arts" (Un palais, cercle des beaux-arts). As a laureate of the prize, he became a resident (pensionnaire) at the Académie de France à Rome at the Villa Medici from 29 January 1882 to 31 December 1885.

== Career ==
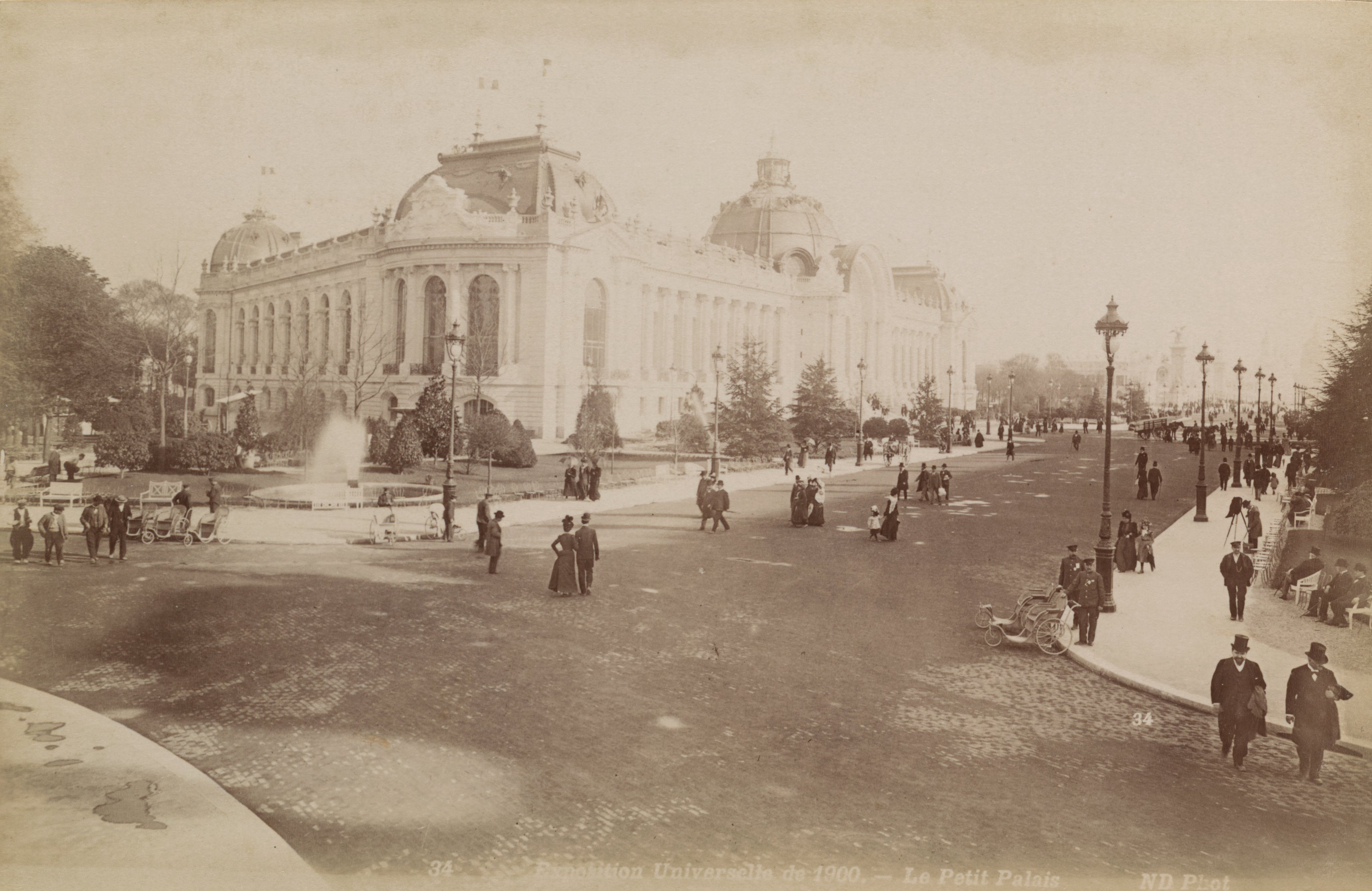
Avenue Alexandre-III (now Avenue Winston-Churchill) during the 1900 Exposition Universelle, showing the Petit Palais in the foreground and Deglane's colonnaded Grand Palais façade on the right.

Following his return to France, Deglane continued to exhibit regularly at the Salon des Artistes Français, obtaining a second-class medal in 1887 and a medal of honor in 1888. At the 1889 Exposition Universelle, he achieved a gold medal and served as the second inspector of the expansive Palais des Machines. In 1890, he was appointed director of an architectural studio (chef d'atelier) at the École des Beaux-Arts, where he mentored numerous prominent architects over subsequent decades.

=== Construction of the Grand Palais ===
For the Exposition Universelle of 1900, the French government organised an open architectural competition in 1896 for a grand exhibition palace on the Champs-Élysées. Deglane's submission, designed in collaboration with Jean-Camille Binet, was awarded second prize. The authorities ultimately chose to combine the best proposals, commissioning a consortium of four architects: Deglane, Albert Louvet, Albert-Félix-Théophile Thomas, and Charles Girault.

Deglane was placed in charge of the most prominent component: the expansive central nave and the monumental Beaux-Arts colonnaded façade fronting Avenue Alexandre-III (now Avenue Winston-Churchill). His successful completion of the palace earned him promotion to Officer of the Legion of Honour in 1900.

=== Public and private works ===
The Château de Laussel in Marquay, Dordogne, a sixteenth-century castle restored by Deglane, where he lived until his death.

Beyond the Grand Palais, Deglane undertook significant civic, colonial, and residential projects. For the 1906 Colonial Exhibition of Marseille, he designed the West African Palace (Palais de l'Afrique occidentale). Internationally, he designed the Palais de la République in Dakar, Senegal, initially constructed as the official residence of the Governor-General of French West Africa (AOF).

In Paris, Deglane designed several private apartment buildings and mansions, including:

- A commercial and apartment building at 90 Rue de Grenelle (7th arrondissement, 1906).
- A luxury residential building at 12 and 12bis Avenue Élisée-Reclus (7th arrondissement, 1910).
- A hôtel particulier at 15 Rue d'Andigné (16th arrondissement, 1924).
- The seaside Villa Aigue-Marine in Royan, Charente-Maritime (1910).

He also designed architectural pedestals and settings for prominent public monuments, including monuments to Lazare Carnot in Nolay, Joseph François Dupleix in Landrecies, William Shakespeare in Paris (formerly at Boulevard Haussmann and Avenue de Messine), Joan of Arc in Chinon, President Sadi Carnot in Angoulême, and Guy de Maupassant in Parc Monceau, Paris.

== Later years ==
In 1918, Deglane was elected a member of the Académie des Beaux-Arts (Institut de France), taking Seat #1 in the architecture section to succeed Henri-Paul Nénot, a post he retained until his death.

In his later years, Deglane acquired the Château de Laussel, a fortified castle dating from the fifteenth and sixteenth centuries situated in Marquay in the Dordogne department, and dedicated substantial resources to its comprehensive architectural restoration. On the castle's grounds in 1911, the famed Upper Paleolithic limestone bas-relief known as the "Venus of Laussel" had been discovered by Dr. Jean-Gaston Lalanne.

Deglane died at the Château de Laussel on 13 May 1931 at the age of 75. He was interred in Montparnasse Cemetery in Paris (division 2).

== Honours ==
- Third-Class Medal, Salon des Artistes Français (1880)
- Premier Grand Prix de Rome in Architecture (1881)
- Second-Class Medal, Salon des Artistes Français (1887)
- Medal of Honor, Salon des Artistes Français (1888)
- Gold Medal, Paris Universal Exposition (1889)
- Officer of the Legion of Honour (1900)
- Member of the Académie des Beaux-Arts (1918–1931)

== See also ==
- Grand Palais
- École nationale supérieure des beaux-arts
- Prix de Rome
