= Cap-de-la-Madeleine =

- Trois-Rivières
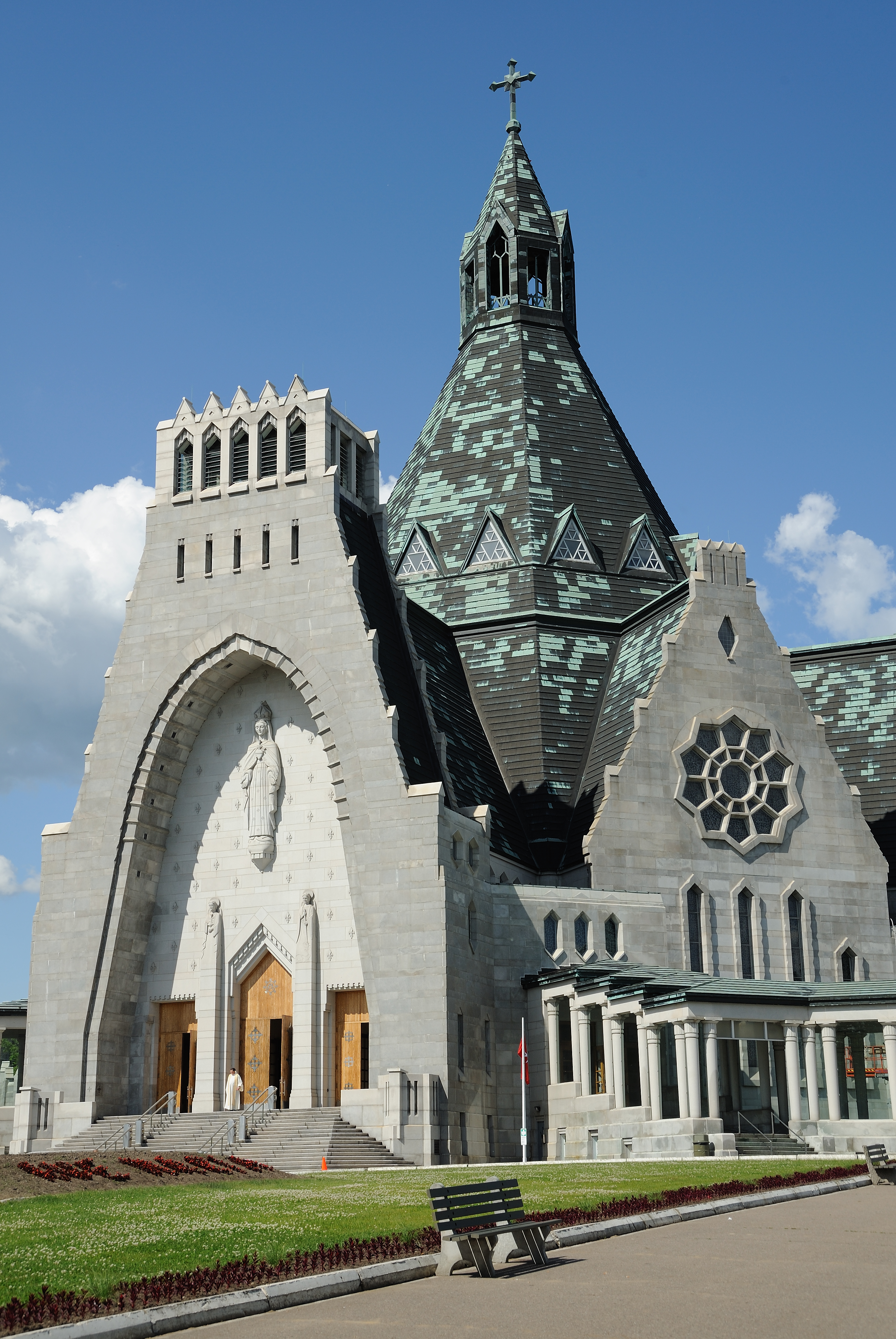
- Basilica of Cap-de-la-Madeleine
- Interactive map of Cap-de-la-Madeleine
- Coordinates: 46°22′00″N 72°30′00″W
- Country: Canada
- Province: Quebec
- Region: Mauricie
- Incorporated: March 20, 1651
- Merged: January 1, 2002
- Electoral Districts Federal: Champlain
- Provincial: Champlain

Government
  - Type: Borough
  - Mayor: Jean Lamarche
  - Federal MP(s): Lise St-Denis (Lib)
  - Quebec MNA(s): Noella Champagne (PQ)

Area
  - Land: 18.26 km^{2} (7.05 sq mi)

Population (2006)
  - Total: 33,022
  - Density: 1,808.4/km^{2} (4,684/sq mi)
  - Change (2001-06): ▲1.5%
  - Dwellings: 15,805
- Time zone: UTC−05:00 (EST)
  - Summer (DST): UTC−04:00 (EDT)
- Area code: 819
- Access Routes A-40 A-55: A-30; R-157
- Website: http://www.v3r.net/

Cap-de-la-Madeleine (French pronunciation: [kap də la madlɛn]) is a former city in Quebec, Canada at the confluence of the Saint-Maurice River and the St. Lawrence River. It was amalgamated into the City of Trois-Rivières in 2002. Population (2006 census) 33,022.

== History ==
Cap-de-la-Madeleine was founded March 20, 1651. The establishment was named by Jacques de La Ferté, who was abbot of Sainte-Madeleine de Châteaudun in France.

The city is famous for its basilica, Basilique Notre-Dame du Cap, dedicated to Our Lady of the Cape. The Basilica receives thousands of pilgrims and visitors each year. Pilgrims are drawn to the site because it is considered to be the place where two miracles were performed by the Blessed Virgin Mary, the first being the Miracle of the Ice Bridge (1879) and the other being the Miracle of the Eyes (1888). The first official pilgrimage occurred in 1883 and consisted of roughly 150 people who travelled to the location by foot. The site is considered the first pilgrimage site in North America, excluding Mexico.

During World War II the Royal Canadian Air Force built and operated No. 11 Elementary Flying Training School as part of the British Commonwealth Air Training Plan in Cap-de-la-Madelaine. The school opened on October 14, 1940 and closed on February 11, 1944. The airfield was located in what is now a residential area near rue Saint Maurice and rue de Grandmont (46°23′00″N 072°31′00″W)

The inhabitants call themselves Madelinois and Madelinoise.

== Other interesting sites ==
- Fort Saint-François: built 1660 and late abandoned with no visible traces remaining on what is now Notre dame du Cap Sanctuary
- Fort du Moulin-à-Vent: built between 1649 and 1653; now a residential area

== Notable people from Cap-de-la-Madeleine ==
- Pierre Boucher (1600s to 1700s) - Early leader of New France, he briefly had a land grant here.
- Léon Rochefort (born 1939), hockey player (NHL)
- Jean-Guy Talbot (1932–2024), hockey player (NHL) and coach
- Charles Thiffault (born 1939), NHL ice hockey coach

== Mediagraphy ==
In addition to the general works on Trois-Rivières and Mauricie, here are some books specifically on the Cap-de-la-Madeleine:

1. Maurice Loranger, Histoire de Cap-de-la-Madeleine (1651-1986), Cap-de-la-Madeleine, published on author's account, 1987, 337 pages (this book has no ISBN)(in French)
2. Maurice Loranger, Aperçu historique de la paroisse Sainte-Marie-Madeleine du Cap-de-la-Madeleine à l'occasion du tricentenaire de son érection canonique, Cap-de-la-Madeleine, [s.é.], 1978, 112 p.(in French)
3. Maurice Loranger, La chronique madelinoise, 1651-2001 [et] Les maires de Cap-de-la-Madeleine, City of Cap-de-la-Madeleine, 2001, 103 p.(in French)
4. Maurice Loranger, 125 ans de régime municipal au Cap-de-la-Madeleine, published by "Société d'histoire du Cap-de-la-Madeleine", 1981, 66 p.(in French)
5. Paul-Émile Breton, o.m.i., Cap-de-la-Madeleine, cité mystique de Marie, Trois-Rivières, Imprimerie Saint-Joseph, 1937, 213 pages.(in French)
6. François De Lagrave, Cap-de-la-Madeleine, 1651-2001. Une ville d'une singulière destinée, Cap-de-la-Madeleine, Éditions of 350^{e} anniversaire of Cap-de-la-Madeleine, 2002, 1288 p.(in French)
7. Album-souvenir des fêtes du 50^{e} anniversaire de la paroisse Saint-Lazare [de] Cap-de-la-Madeleine, 1927-1977, [s.é.], 1977, 125 p.(in French)
8. Marie-Hélène Campagna, Louis-Pierre Légaré et Amilie Picard, Inventaire architectural. Cap-de-la-Madeleine. Rues Fusey et Sainte-Madeleine, Département d'aménagement, Université Laval, avril 1997, 38 p.(in French)
9. Martin Dubois and Anne-Marie Bussières, Patrimoine du centre-ville de Cap-de-la-Madeleine. Historique des propriétés. Rues Fusey, Saint-Laurent et Sainte-Madeleine. (Répertoire), Cap-de-la-Madeleine, Rues principales de Cap-de-la-Madeleine, janvier 1999, 97 p.(in French)
10. Martin Dubois et Anne-Marie Bussières, Patrimoine du centre-ville de Cap-de-la-Madeleine. Guide d'intervention, Cap-de-la-Madeleine, Main streets of Cap-de-la-Madeleine, January 1999, 76 p.(in French)
11. Yannick Gendron, Grandes gens, petites histoires, Cap-de-la-Madeleine, 1651-2001, Cap-de-la-Madeleine, Corporation des fêtes du 350^{e} de Cap-de-la-Madeleine, 2001, 104 p.(in French)
12. Répertoire des édifices anciens [et] Historique des noms de rues de Cap-de-la-Madeleine, Corporation des fêtes du 350^{e} anniversaire de Cap-de-la-Madeleine, 2001, 138 p.(in French)
13. Patri-Arch, Inventaire du patrimoine bâti de la ville de Trois-Rivières, Secteur Cap-de-la-Madeleine, Trois-Rivières, City of Trois-Rivières, 2010, 85 pages.(in French)
14. Cap-de-la-Madeleine 1673-1920 - Répertoire de mariages, publication no. C002, published by "Le Club de généalogie de Longueuil", 1986, 105 p.(in French)

== See also ==
- List of former cities in Quebec
