= Paul Bellot =

French monk and architect (1876–1944)

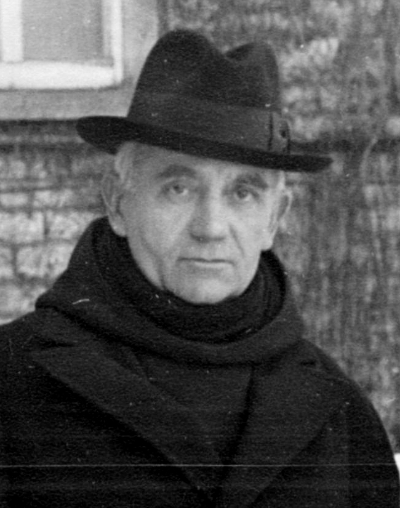
Paul Bellot (c.1937)

Paul Louis Denis Bellot (7 June 1876 in Paris – 5 July 1944 in Montreal) was a French monk and modern architect.

== Biography ==
He became an architect in 1900 having studied at the École des Beaux-Arts. In 1902 he became a monk of the Benedictines of Solesmes. These monks were in exile in England, and Bellot began building Quarr Abbey on the Isle of Wight.

In the Netherlands Bellot designed St. Paul's Abbey, Oosterhout, for the Order. He designed several churches in the Netherlands, France, Belgium, Canada and Portugal. Most of these are built largely of concrete or brick which were his preferred materials.

Bellot was a member of L'Arche, an organisation whose goal was to use modern materials and art for religious purposes. In Canada, where he moved in 1937, he influenced several architects (i.e. Dom Claude-Marie Côté, also a Benedictine monk, and Adrien Dufresne, a layman) and his architectural influence became known as "Bellotism".

His ideas are expounded in Propos d'un bâtisseur du Bon Dieu which was published posthumously in 1949; it is based on lectures he gave in Canada in 1934.

== Chief works ==
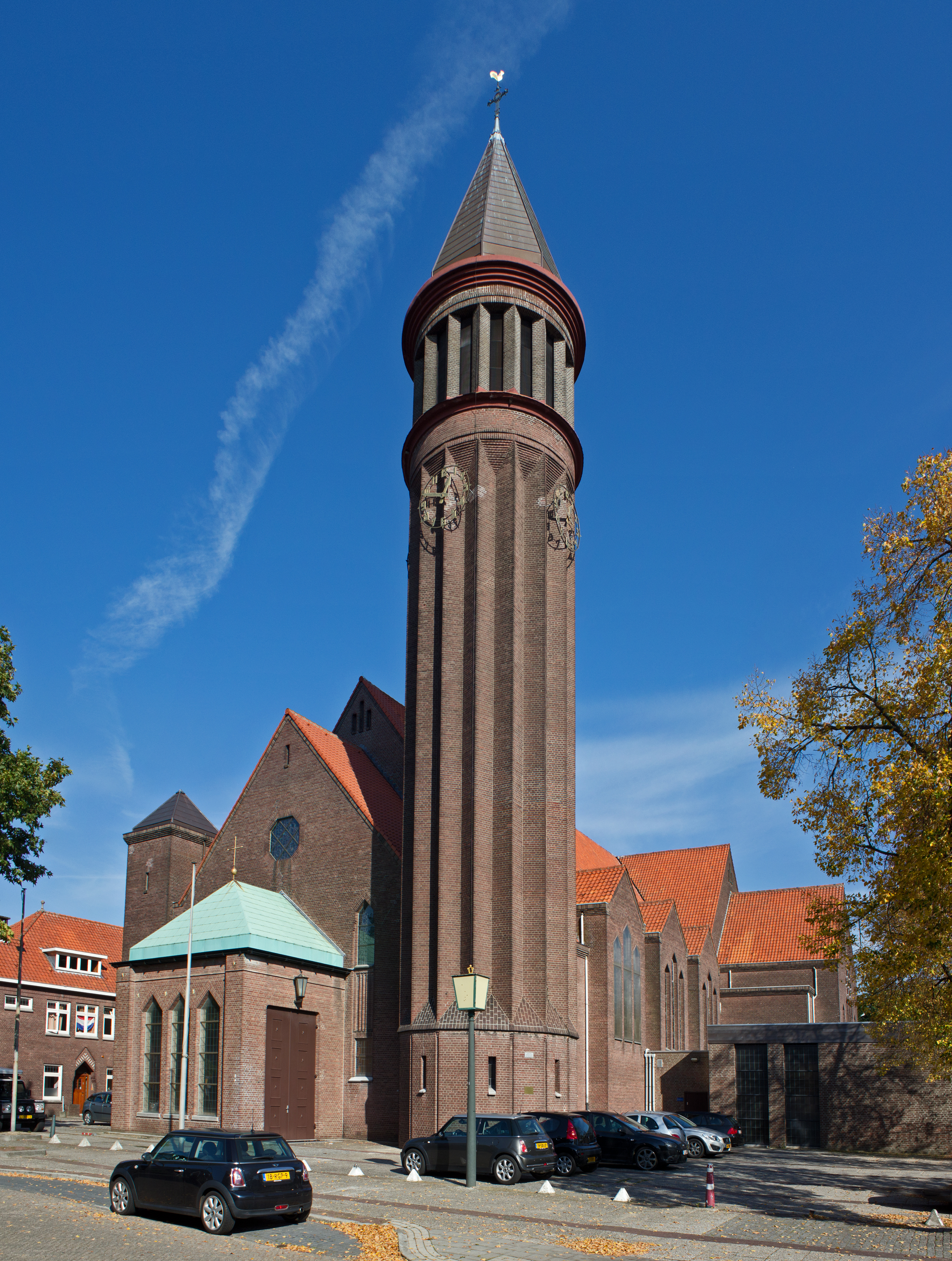
Heilig Hartkerk, Eindhoven

- St. Paul's Abbey, Oosterhout, the Netherlands, 1906–1907
- Quarr Abbey, Isle of Wight, 1907–1911
- church of Saint Chrysolus, Comines, 1925-1929, in collaboration with Maurice Storez.
- chapel and monastery of the Visitation, Kraainem, Belgium, 1929-1930.
- church of Notre-Dame de l'Immaculée Conception, Audincourt, 1932, early building in reinforced concrete.
- library, cloister gallery, and lavatorium at Solesmes Abbey
- chapel of Saint Louis' Seminary, on the domain of Saint Hubert, Neuvy-sur-Barangeon, Cher, 1936.
- church of Notre-Dame de la Paix, the garden city of Suresnes, 1936.
- basilica of Saint-Joseph-des-Fins, Annecy.
- priory of Saint Bathilda, Vanves, 1934-1936.
- château du Grand Chavanon, Neuvy-sur-Barangeon, 1935-1937.
- church of Nossa Senhora da Conceição, Porto, Portugal, 1939–1947.
- Saint Benedict Abbey, Saint-Benoît-du-Lac, Québec, Canada.
- completion of the dome and exterior of the basilica of Saint Joseph's Oratory, Montreal, Québec, Canada.

== Filmography ==
- François Brault and Guy L. Coté made a film about Dom Bellot at Quebec in 1987: Dom Bellot, architecte, 1876–1943.
