= Adrien Dufresne =

Canadian architect

- Born: 1904
- Died: 1983 (aged 78–79); Beauport, Quebec
- Education: École des beaux-arts de Quebec
- Occupation: Architect
- Buildings: Notre-Dame-du-Cap Basilica

Adrien Dufresne (1904-1983) was a Canadian architect from Beauport, Quebec. He is primarily known for his impact on religious architecture in Canada during the 20th century.

== Biography ==
Adrien Dufresne studied at the École des beaux-arts de Montréal from 1924 to 1930. Many of the drawings created by Dufresne during his time at the school are stored within the Laval University. Dufresne was a close friend of Dom Paul Bellot, and was greatly influenced by his architectural style. He wrote to Bellot in the 1920s after reading about his work in various publications. At Dufresne's encouragement, Bellot travelled to Canada in 1937, where he influenced many local architects.

Dufresne designed several monuments, cathedrals and religious structures, including the Notre-Dame-du-Cap Basilica in Trois-Rivières, Quebec. He began work on the basilica in 1955, although the basilica was not opened until 1964.

== Death and legacy ==
Dufresne spent much of his life in Beauport, Quebec City, where he died in 1983 in his family home. Adrien-Dufresne Boulevard in his home district of Beauport was named after him in 1992.
