= Château de Puymartin =

Castle in Marquay, Dordogne, France

Coordinates: 44°54′38″N 1°8′33″E

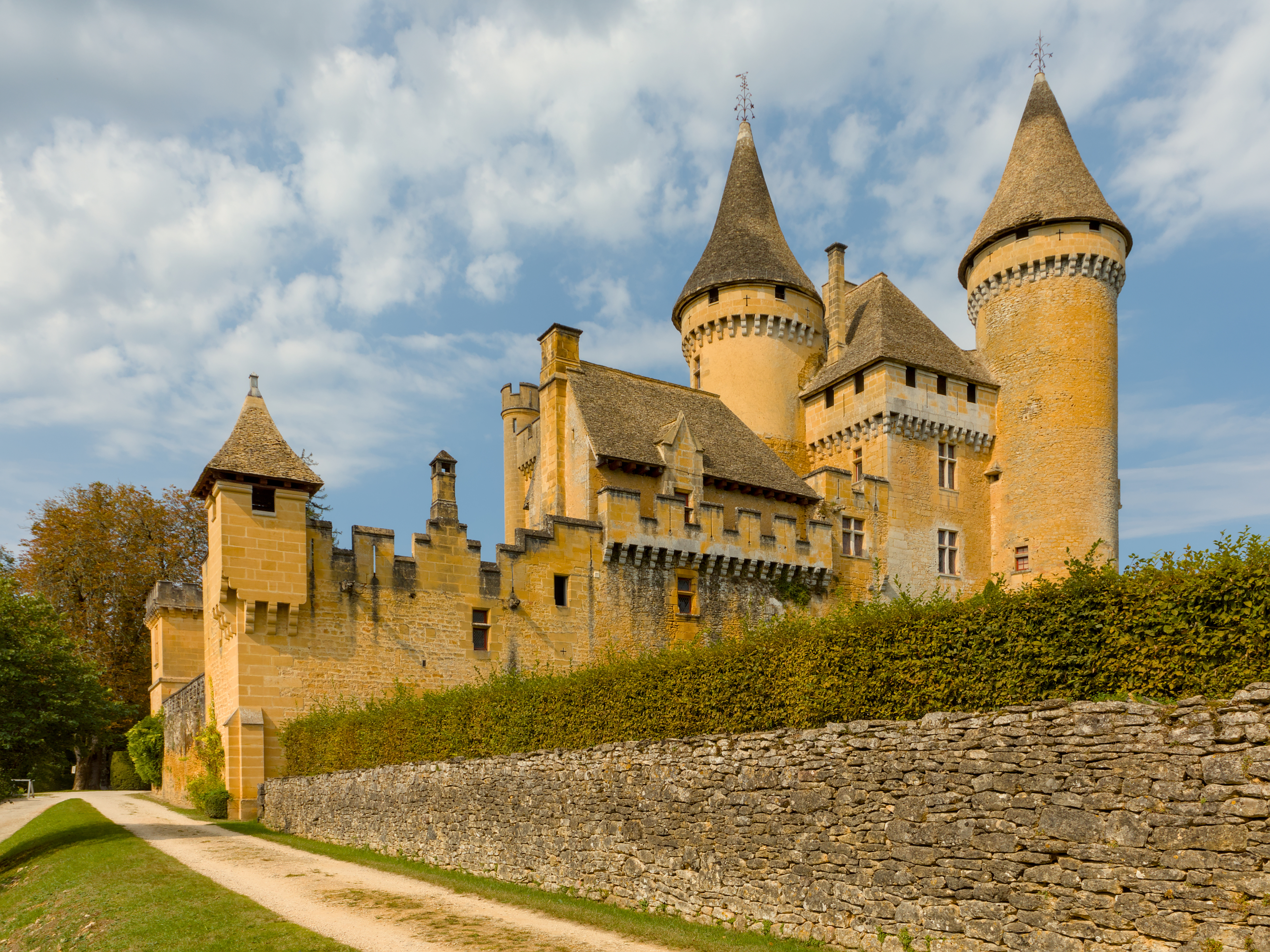
Château de Puymartin

The Château de Puymartin is a castle in the commune of Marquay, in the Dordogne département of France, located between Sarlat (8 km) and Les Eyzies (11 km)

== History ==
The castle was built during the 13th century. It was taken by the English in 1357. The consuls of Sarlat bought the domaine back from the English but then abandoned the castle.

Radulphe de Saint-Clar re-purchased it in 1450 and enlarged it.

During the 16th century, Raymond de Saint-Clar defeated the Protestants during the French Wars of Religion. Under the name of Capitaine de Puymartin, he expelled the Huguenots from Sarlat.

During the 18th century, Jean de Saint-Clar contended with his sister Suzanne for possession of the castle. Suzanne won and kept Puymartin. The castle was finally abandoned during the 18th century.

During the 19th century, the marquis of Carbonnier de Marzac restored the castle in a neo-Gothic style.

Château de Puymartin is listed as a monument historique by the French Ministry of Culture.

== See also ==
- List of castles in France
