= Château du Grand Chavanon =

Coordinates: 47.300443°N 2.232859°E

- Château de Saint-Hubert
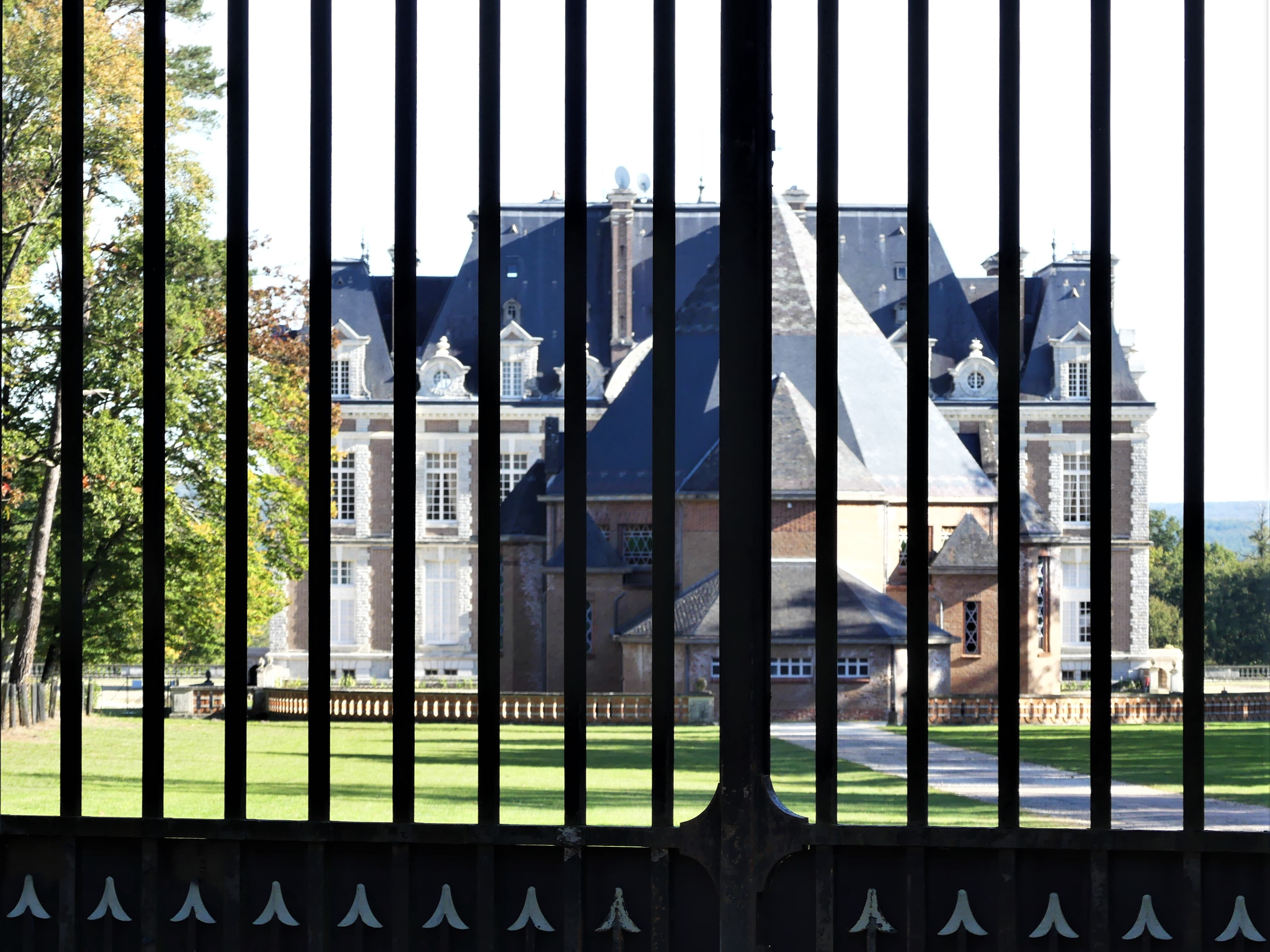
- Interactive map of the Château du Grand Chavanon area

General information
- Type: château
- Location: Neuvy-sur-Barangeon, France
- Construction started: 1893
- Completed: 1897

Design and construction
- Architects: Albert-Félix-Théophile Thomas; Paul Bellot

The Château du Grand Chavanon (French pronunciation: [ʃato dy ɡʁɑ̃ ʃavanɔ̃]), also known as the Château de Saint-Hubert (pronounced [ʃato də sɛ̃t‿ybɛʁ]), is a historic château in Neuvy-sur-Barangeon, Cher, France.

== History ==
The chateau was built for the Marquess of Borzas from 1893 to 1897. It was designed by architect Albert-Félix-Théophile Thomas. It was acquired by the Archbishop of Bourges in 1935, and renovated by architect-monk Paul Bellot from 1935 to 1937.

The chateau was acquired by Centrafrican Emperor Jean-Bédel Bokassa in the 1970s. From 1986 to 1995, Bokassa rented it to the Cercle national des combattants, a veteran non-profit organization run by far-right politician Roger Holeindre. The Cercle acquired it from Bokassa in 1995. The chateau hosted the Cadets de France et d'Europe, a summer programme for conservative Catholic youth, until 1999. By the early 2000s, it hosted summer events for the youth wing of the National Front.

== Architectural significance ==
It has been listed as an official historical monument by the French Ministry of Culture since 31 July 2008.
