= Frédéric Janssoone =

French Friar Minor missionary to the Holy Land and French Canada

Blessed Frédéric of St-Yves Janssoone OFM
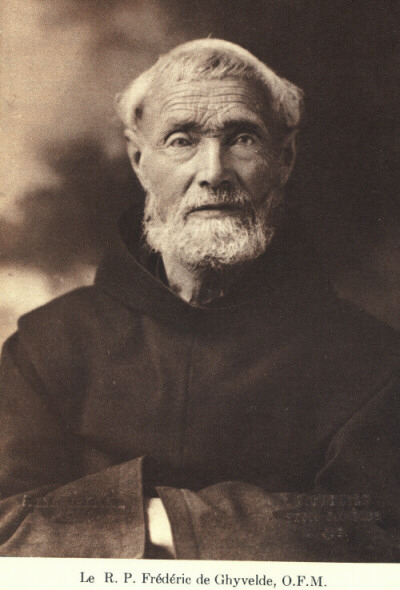
- Evangelizer of French Canada
- Born: Frédéric-Cornil Janssoone; 19 November 1838; Ghyvelde, Nord, France
- Died: 4 August 1916; Montreal, Quebec, Canada
- Venerated in: Catholic Church
- Beatified: 25 September 1988, Vatican City, by Pope John Paul II
- Major shrine: Chapel of St. Anthony; Trois-Rivières, Quebec
- Feast: 5 August

Frédéric Janssoone, also known as Frédéric of Ghyvelde or Frédéric of Saint-Yves (19 November 1838 – 4 August 1916), was a French-born Franciscan friar who worked in France, Egypt, Palestine and Quebec, where he died. He was a popular preacher who re-established the Friars Minor in Canada. He has been beatified by the Catholic Church.

== Early life ==
Janssoone was born in the town of Ghyvelde, in the French Department of Nord, the country's most northwestern corner, on 19 November 1838. It is a part of French Flanders where the local language is a dialect of Flemish. He was the eighth and youngest of the thirteen children of Pierre-Antoine Janssoone and Marie-Isabelle Bollengier, and was christened Frédéric-Cornil. He was born into a prosperous farming family who prized culture, education and their faith.

Janssone was just nine years old in January 1848 when his father died. Four years later, in response, to a religious calling, the young Frédéric enrolled in a college and then graduated to the Institut Notre-Dame des Dunes in nearby Dunkirk to prepare for the priesthood. In 1855, however, the family fell on hard times, so the boy left school to help support his mother and siblings. He went to work for some textile merchants, for whom he became a traveling salesman. He soon realized that he had a talent for selling. He liked meeting new people and he knew how to explain his products.

His mother died in 1861, at which point Janssoone decided to resume his studies. After their completion, on 24 June 1864, he entered the novitiate of the Friars Minor, where he added the patronage of St. Yves to his name, making his profession the following year. He was ordained in Bourges on 17 August 1870. His ordination was done earlier than in the normal scheme, due to the outbreak of the Franco-Prussian War at the time. Military chaplains were in great need, and he was quickly assigned to serve at a military hospital.

After the war Jannsoone helped to establish a friary in Bordeaux, where he was appointed as guardian in 1873. Since he found the role unbearable, he was relieved of this responsibility a year later. His release gave him the freedom to take a course in homiletics, at which he would excel all his life.

== The Holy Land ==
=== Vicar of the Custody ===
In 1876 Janssoone applied to serve in the Order's international Custody of the Holy Land, which has been responsible for the Christian sites there and the pilgrims who visited them since the days of their founder, Saint Francis of Assisi. His superiors accepted his request.

He was initially assigned to serve as chaplain for a school in Cairo, Egypt, run by the Brothers of the Christian Schools. Two years later he was sent to Jerusalem to serve as Vicar of the Custody, immediately under the Custos. This position was primarily one of handling the administrative duties of the Custody, most especially the maintenance of the Christian shrines scattered throughout Palestine. Additionally, to provide a center for their work, Janssoone ordered the building of a new parish church, St. Catherine of Bethlehem, adjacent to the Church of the Nativity in Bethlehem.

To accomplish the demands of his duties, Janssoone had to sort through dozens of documents and manuscripts detailing the rules of procedure for the sharing of these sites with Christians of other Churches which had been worked out over the centuries of rule of the Holy Land under the Ottoman Empire. He compiled a guide to help the friars in their relations with the other Churches, which remains of use to the Custody today. He served in that post for ten years.

In addition to his many administrative duties during that period, Janssoone also served as a guide for the many Christian pilgrims who visited the Holy Lands from around the world. His knowledge and skill in presentation made him a popular guide. It was in this way that he met a priest from Canada, the Abbé Léon Provancher, pastor of Cap-Rouge in Quebec, who invited him to come to Canada. Janssoone accepted the offer in order to make a fundraising tour to help the various construction projects of the Custody.

=== A mission to Canada ===
Janssoone arrived in Lévis, Quebec, on 24 August 1881. He immediately began to preach and give talks around the region. Shortly after the start of his visit, however, he stumbled slightly, through giving a talk on liberalism, unaware that this topic was causing a major division between the politicians and the ultramontane Catholic clergy of the province. Otherwise, his many sermons were greeted enthusiastically by the people. He preached throughout Quebec to large crowds. He was even invited to French-speaking parishes in New England. Nevertheless, to quiet continuing complaints resulting from the infamous speech by the foreign visitor, that following March, the Archbishop of Quebec, Elzéar-Alexandre Taschereau, ordered Janssoone to leave the Archdiocese. Taschereau tempered his action, though, with a command that collections for the Custody of the Holy Land were to be taken up in all churches of the ecclesiastical province on every Good Friday. This practice later spread throughout the Catholic Church.

Janssoone returned to Palestine in May 1882, exhausted and sick. He resumed his administrative duties and stayed there another six years. He would later write Provancher that, after reflection, were he ever to return to Canada, he would completely avoid the political aspect which had caused such an uproar and focus on the program established by St. Francis, one of preaching charity, penance and peace, focusing on bringing people back to God. He was to have a chance to carry out this intention.

== A new home in Canada ==
The impact of Janssoone's tour upon the Catholics of Quebec was enormous. They saw him as reviving a tradition of the Franciscan missions to that nation which had started at the foundation of New France and had ended with the death of the last Recollect friar (a reform branch of the Order) there in 1813. This was due to the fact that, after its conquest by Great Britain in 1759, further candidates to the Order had been forbidden. Repeated requests to the authorities of the Minorite Order finally resulted in his assignment to serve the Custody in Canada on a permanent basis.

Janssoone arrived back in Canada at the end of June 1888 on a permanent basis, and by August had begun to build a residence, called St. Joseph Friary, at Trois-Rivières, which was the first community of Friars Minor in Canada in a generation. The friary was considered a Commissariat of the Franciscan Order, a small center of recruitment and fundraising. A new and more permanent structure was built in 1903.

Shortly after his arrival, Janssoone was drawn into the promotion of the local Marian shrine of Notre-Dame-du-Cap by Louis-François Richer Laflèche, the Bishop of Trois-Rivières, who wanted to revive the sanctuary built there by the pastor of that town. He agreed to this reluctantly. He then set about touring the entire province to promote visits to the shrine. Janssoone would organize travel by train and boat for the many people he started to draw to the site. He would preach there himself and dedicated the people to Our Lady of the Rosary, its patron saint. Amazing miracles started to occur, which drew ever larger crowds. By the time the work was given to the Oblate Fathers in 1902, visits to the shrine numbered about 30,000-40,000 per year.

While occupied with this, at the request of his superiors Janssoone also started to undertake massive fundraising drives which required travel throughout the province, a task he performed for fifteen years. He would preach in churches and go house-to-house for this, braving the harshness of the Canadian winter and farm dogs, selling some of the many books he wrote at night instead of sleeping. He had only one coat and would frequently sleep on the ground during these trips. Additionally, he also organized pilgrimages to the other great shrine of Quebec, the Basilica of Sainte-Anne-de-Beaupré.

In further service to the Franciscan movement, from his first arrival in Canada Janssoone worked to revive the Third Order of St. Francis, which had been established by the Recollect friars in 1681 for the spiritual growth of the laity, but had dwindled since the incorporation of the colony into Great Britain. He acted as spiritual director to the surviving fraternities scattered around the Province of Quebec. In addition, he was also working within his own Order to plan for its re-establishment in Canada. This was accomplished in 1890 by the establishment of a friary in Montreal. This led to the foundation of the Province of St. Joseph in Canada, which has been closely tied with the mission in the Holy Land since its foundation, due to Janssoone's role in its foundation.

== Death and veneration ==
Janssoone took to his bed in June 1916 physically worn out by his many exertions in his ministries and in great pain. He was admitted to the Franciscan Infirmary in Montreal, where he was diagnosed as suffering from stomach cancer. After almost two months of intense pain, he died there on the following 4 August. His body was returned to Trois-Rivières, where he was buried in the small chapel he had built attached to the friary.

The cause for his canonization was begun in 1927. Inquiries into his life were made in Canada, France and Egypt, and his many writings were examined. Theologians approved his writings on 14 February 1937, and his cause was officially opened on 26 June 1940, granting him the title of Servant of God. On 25 October 1988, Janssoone was beatified in Vatican City by Pope John Paul II. His tomb is in the Chapel of St. Anthony in Trois-Rivières and has become a place of pilgrimage.
