= Grand Palais =

Historic site, exhibition hall in Paris, France

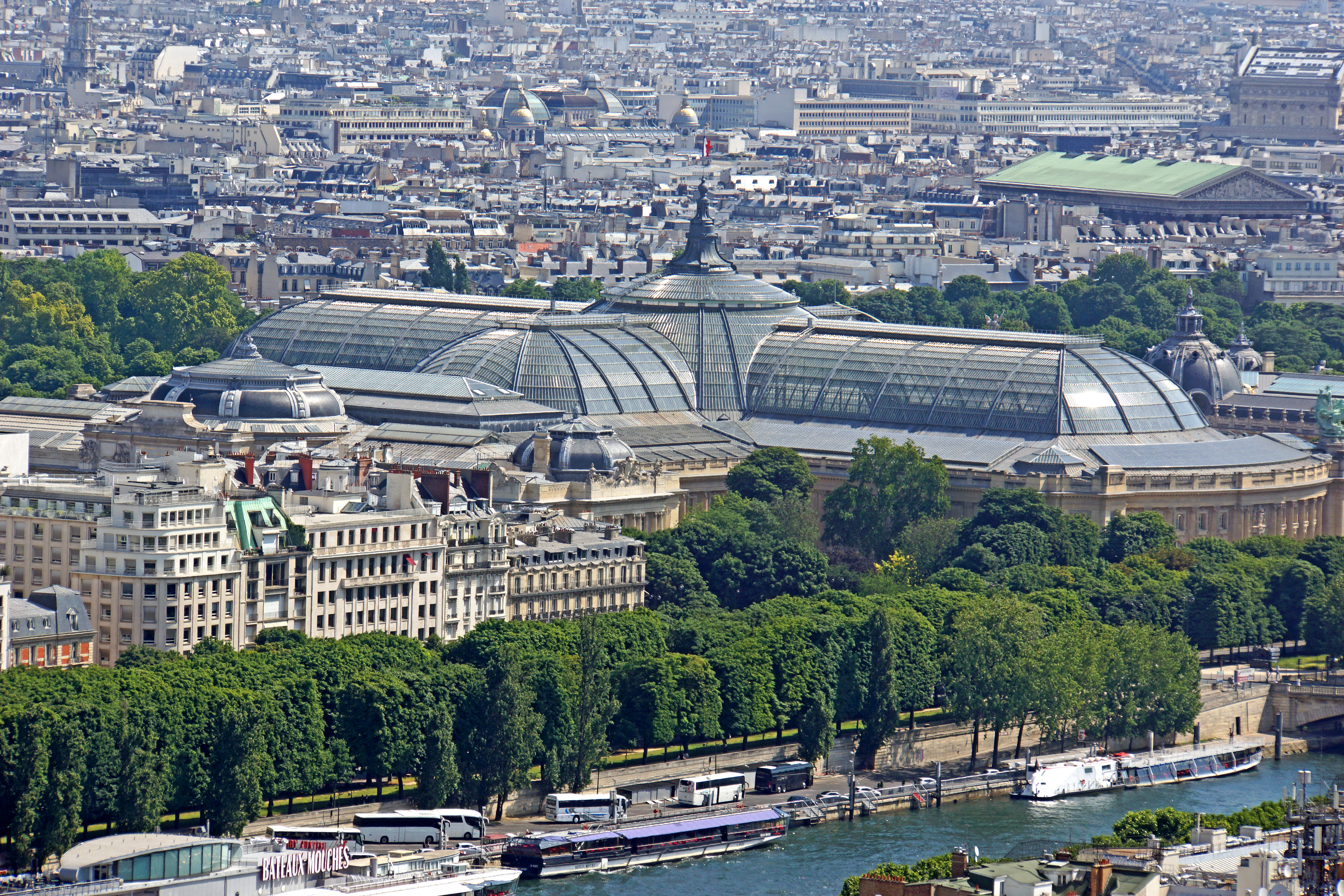
- The Grand Palais (centre) and the Petit Palais (right) as seen from the Eiffel Tower
- Established: Universal Exposition of 1900
- Location: Avenue Winston-Churchill, 75008 Paris, France
- Coordinates: 48°51′58″N 2°18′45″E
- Type: Historic site, exhibition hall
- Visitors: 1,412,060 (2017)
- President: Jean-Paul Cluzel
- Public transit access: Champs-Élysées–Clemenceau; Franklin D. Roosevelt
- Website: http://www.grandpalais.fr/

The Grand Palais des Champs-Élysées (French pronunciation: [ɡʁɑ̃ palɛ de ʃɑ̃z‿elize]; English: Great Palace of the Champs-Élysées), commonly known as the Grand Palais, is a historic site, exhibition hall and museum complex located in the 8th arrondissement of Paris between the Champs-Élysées and the Seine, France, on Avenue Winston-Churchill. Construction of the Grand Palais began in 1897 following the demolition of the Palais de l'Industrie (Palace of Industry) to prepare for the Universal Exposition of 1900. That exposition also produced the adjacent Petit Palais and Pont Alexandre III.

The building was designed to be a large-scale venue for official artistic events. A pediment on the building refers to this function with an inscription that reads, "a monument dedicated by the Republic to the glory of French art." Designed according to Beaux-Arts tastes, the building features ornate stone facades, glass vaults and period innovations that included iron and light steel framing and reinforced concrete.

It is listed as a historic monument (monument historique) by the Ministry of Culture.

== Construction and early years ==
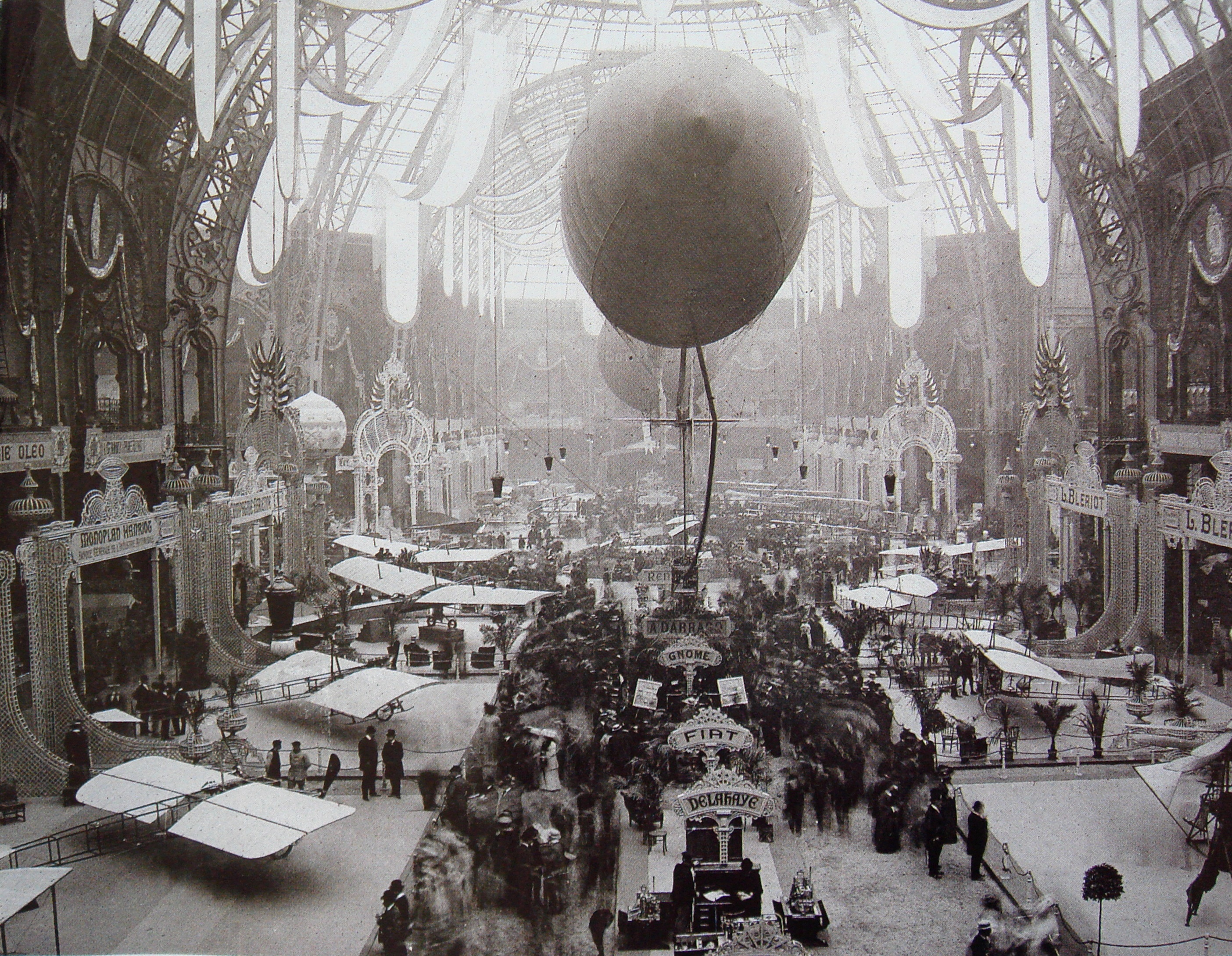
Paris Air Show, 1909, Grand Palais, Paris

The decision to hold the Universal Exposition of 1900 in Paris revealed deep divisions within the French Republic. Critics viewed the project as an economic drain that pulled resources away from provincial governments and questioned the benefit that it would bring to the French economy as a whole. These concerns extended to the planning and construction of the Grand Palais.

Unlike plans for the Trocadéro or the Garnier opera house, only French architects were considered for the project. The final decision was announced on 22 April 1896, with a contract awarded to four people, each with a distinct area of responsibility: Henri Deglane, Albert Louvet, Albert Thomas and Charles Girault.

The grand opening was held on 1 May 1900. From the very beginning the palace was the site of different kinds of shows in addition to the intended art exhibitions. These included a riding competition that took place annually from 1901 to 1957, but were mainly dedicated to innovation and modernity: the automobile, aviation, household appliances, and so on. The golden age of the art exhibitions as such lasted for some thirty years, while the last took place in 1947. The first major Henri Matisse retrospective after his death was held at the Grand Palais.

The principal space extends for nearly 240 m (790 ft). The nave itself measures approximately 200 m (660 ft) in length and 50 m (160 ft) in width, increasing to 100 m (330 ft) between the main entrance and the rear wall of the paddock. The roof rises 35 m (115 ft) above the floor beneath the main framework and 45 m (148 ft) beneath the central cupola, while the campanile reaches a height of approximately 60 m (200 ft). The nave covers 13,500 m^{2} (145,000 sq ft) and its glazed roof has a surface area of approximately 14,000 m^{2} (150,000 sq ft). The nave was constructed with an iron, steel and glass barrel-vaulted roof, making it one of the last major transparent structures inspired by London's Crystal Palace, built to accommodate large gatherings before widespread electric lighting. The main space was originally connected to the other parts of the palace along an east–west axis by a grand staircase in a style combining Classical and Art Nouveau, but the interior layout has since been somewhat modified.

The exterior of this massive palace combines an imposing Classical stone façade with a riot of Art Nouveau ironwork, and a number of allegorical statue groups including work by sculptors Paul Gasq, Camille Lefèvre, Alfred Boucher, Alphonse-Amédée Cordonnier and Raoul Verlet. A monumental copper quadriga by Georges Récipon tops both corners of the main façade. The one on the Champs-Élysées (north) side depicts Immortality Prevailing Over Time (1900) and the one on the Seine (south) side depicts Harmony Triumphing Over Discord (1900).

The structure had problems that started even before it was completed, mainly as a result of subsidence caused by a drop in the water table. The builders attempted to compensate for this subsidence, and for a tendency of the ground to shift, by sinking supporting posts down to firmer soil, since construction could not be delayed. These measures were only partially successful. Further damage occurred once the building was in use. Excessive force applied to structural members during the installation of certain exhibitions such as the Exposition Internationale de la Locomotion Aérienne caused damage, as did acid runoff from the horse shows. Additional problems due to the construction of the building itself revealed themselves over the course of time. Differential rates of expansion and contraction between cast iron and steel members, for example, allowed for water to enter, leading to corrosion and further weakening. When finally one of the glass ceiling panels fell in 1993, the main space had to be closed for restoration work, and was not fully reopened to the public until 2007.

== World Wars I and II ==
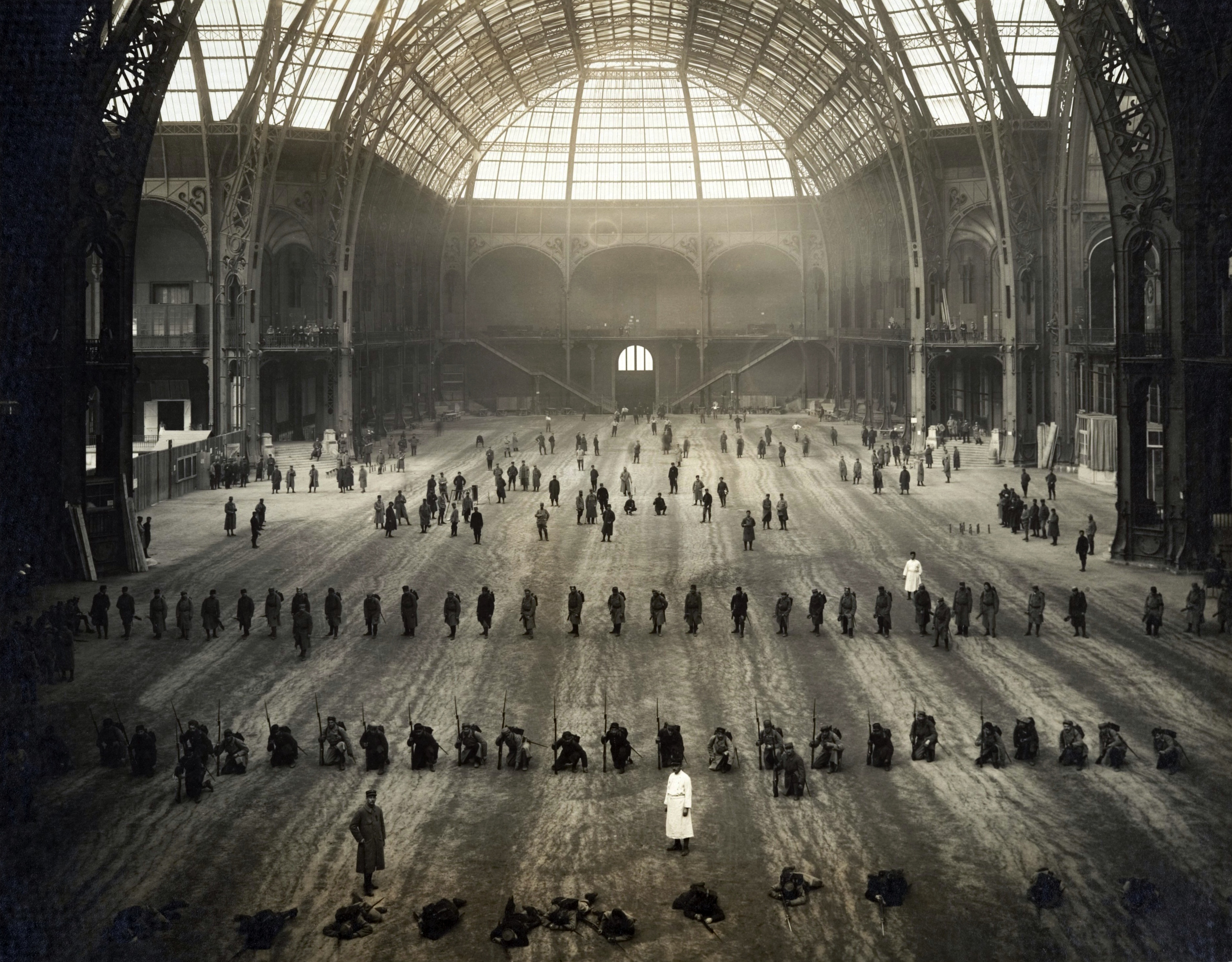
Grand Palais during World War I, 1916

The Palais served as a military hospital during World War I, employing local artists who had not been deployed to the front to decorate hospital rooms or to make moulds for prosthetic limbs.

The Nazis put the Palais to use during the Occupation of France in World War II. First used as a truck depot, the Palais then housed two Nazi propaganda exhibitions.

The Parisian resistance used the Grand Palais as a headquarters during the Liberation of Paris. On 23 August 1944, an advancing German column was fired upon from a window on the Avenue de Sèlves, and the Germans responded with a tank attack upon the Palais. The attack ignited hay that was set up for a circus show, and over the next 48 hours, thick black smoke from the fire caused serious damage to the building. By 26 August, American jeeps were parked in the nave, followed by tanks from the French 2nd Armored Division, completing the liberation of the building.

== Postwar years ==
In the 1960s, Le Corbusier wanted the Grand Palais to be demolished to set up the Museum of 20th Century Art there, which André Malraux had entrusted to him. The death of the architect, on 27 August 1965, put an end to the project.

By decree of 12 June 1975, the nave was classified as a historical monument. A new decree of 6 November 2000 protects the Grand Palais in its entirety.

== 21st century ==
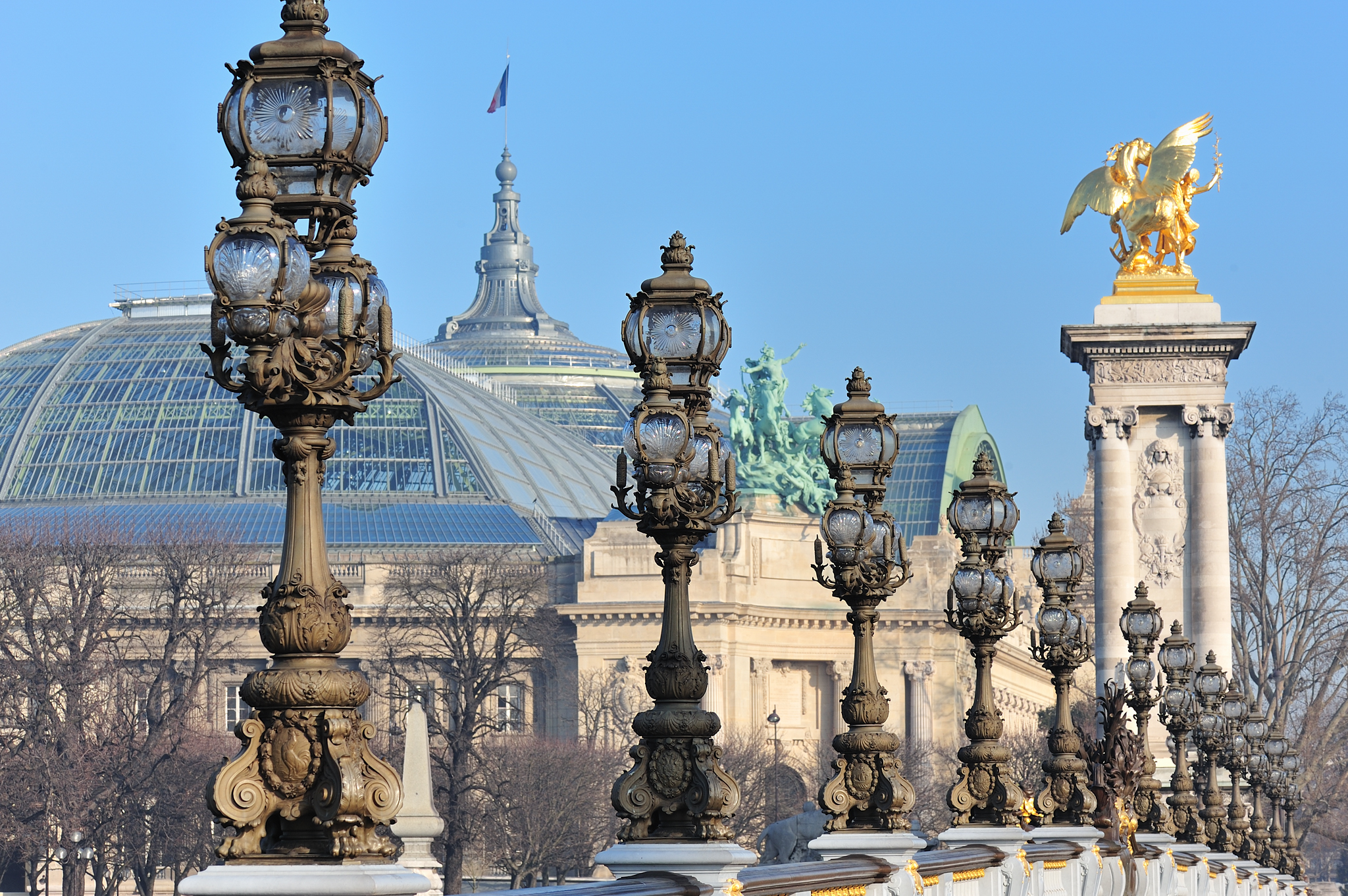
The Grand Palais seen from Pont Alexandre III

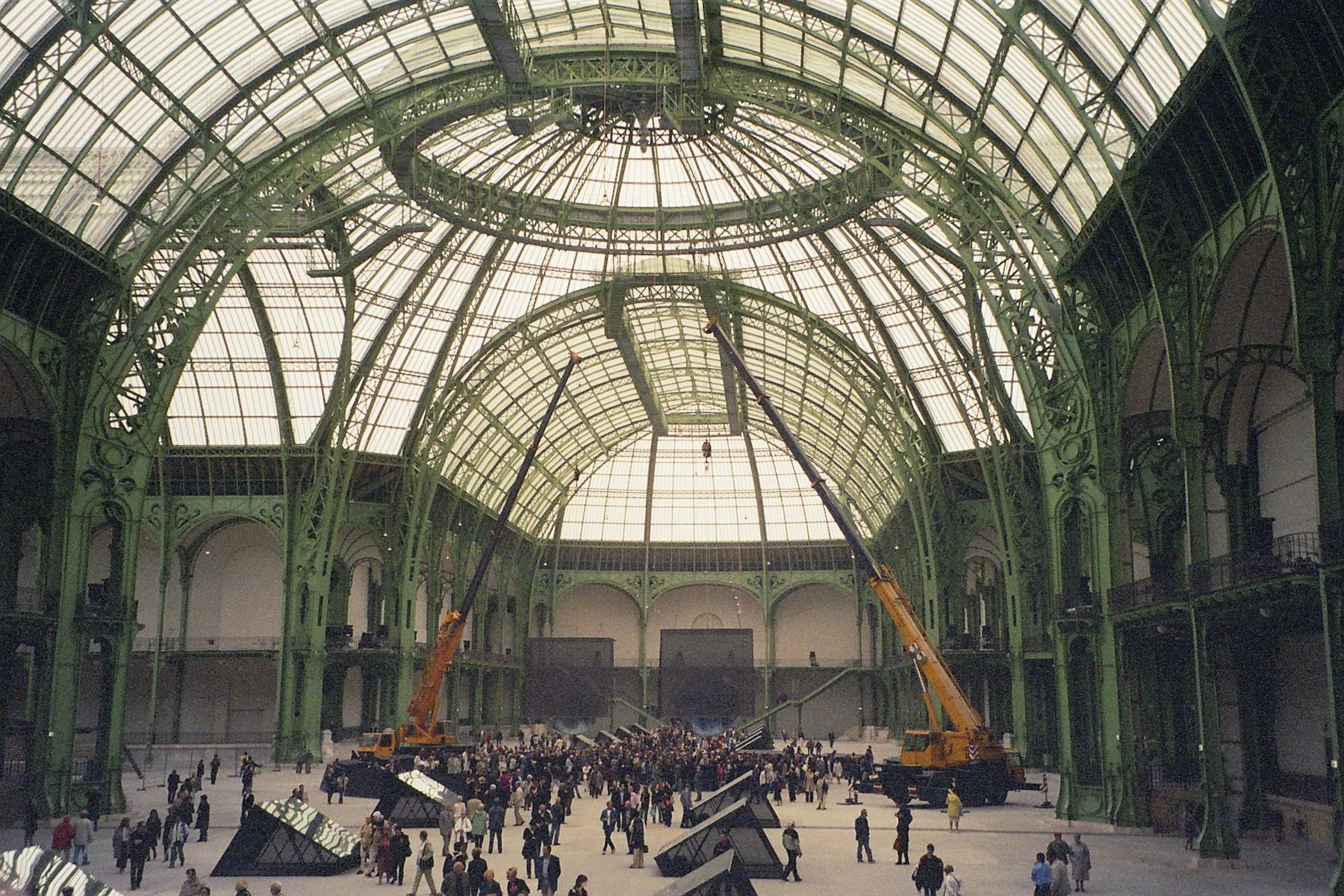
The interior, 2006

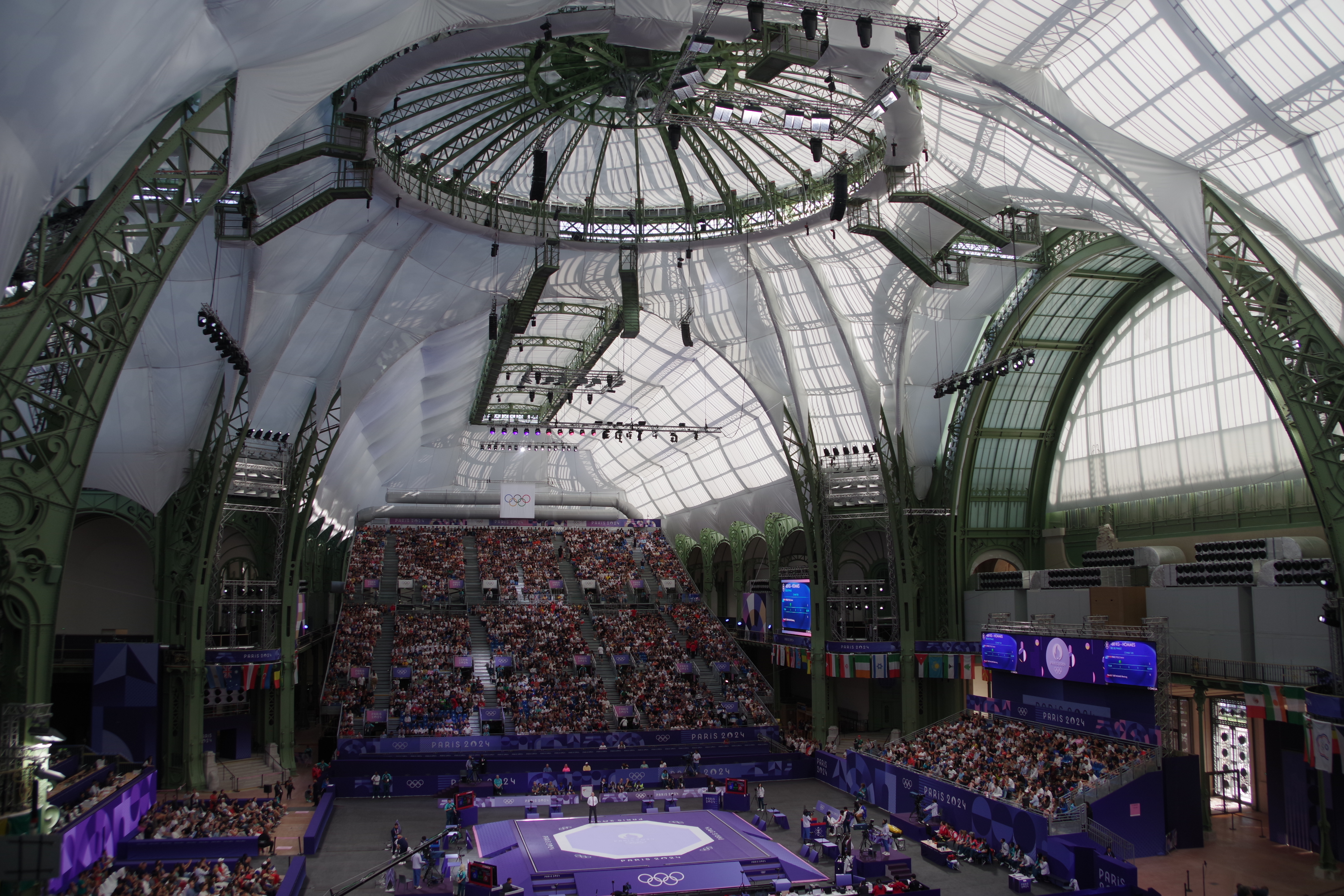
The interior during the 2024 Summer Olympics

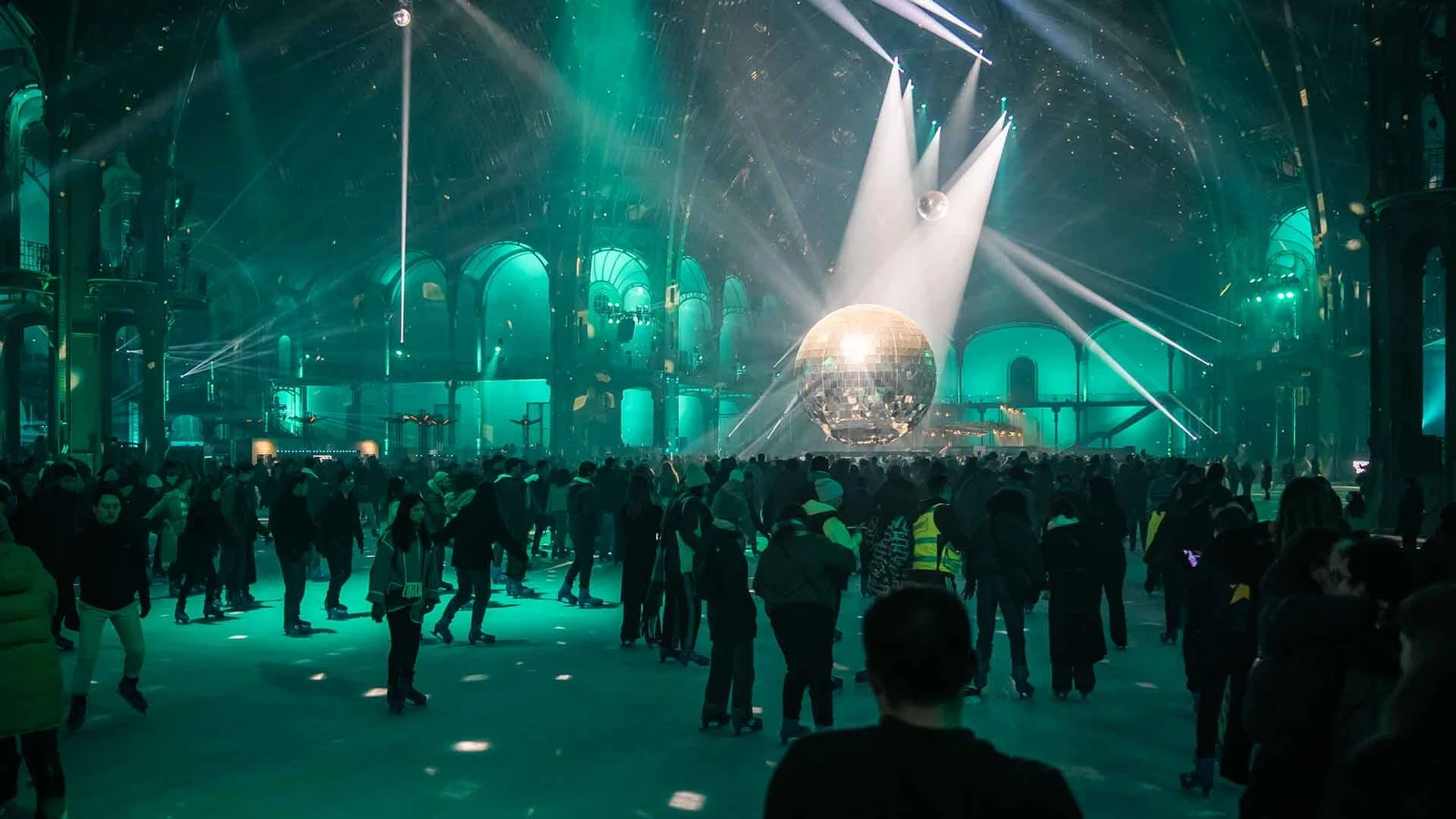
Ice Skating Event at Grand Palais – December 2024

The Grand Palais has a major police station in the basement whose officers help protect the exhibits on show in the Galeries nationales du Grand Palais, particularly the picture exhibition "salons": the Salon de la Société Nationale des Beaux Arts, Salon d'Automne, and Salon Comparaisons. The building's west wing also contains a science museum, the Palais de la Découverte.

It was the host venue of the 2010 World Fencing Championships.

For the 2011 Monumenta exhibition (11 May to 23 June), sculptor Anish Kapoor was commissioned to create the temporary indoor site-specific installation, Leviathan, an enormous (ca. 775,000 square feet) structure that filled half of the main exhibition hall of the Grand Palais.

It was used during the final stage of the Tour de France in 2017, as part of the promotion for Paris' 2024 Summer Olympics bid. The riders rode through the Palais en route to the Champs Élysées.

The Grand Palais temporarily closed to the public in March 2021 for significant renovation works. It reopened in time for the Paris 2024 Olympic Games, where it hosted the fencing and taekwondo events. While it was closed, exhibitions that would otherwise be held there were hosted by other locations, such as the Grand Palais Éphémère and the Musée du Luxembourg in Paris and the Palais de la Bourse in Marseille. In October 2024, after four years of closure, the Grand Palais reopened its doors to the public, once again hosting art fairs, including Art Basel.

In June 2025, the Grand Palais reopened following a €466 million, four‑year overhaul. Highlights include restoration of its iconic glass roof, improved galleries, a new public entrance, 40 lifts, and a Children’s Palace for young visitors. Capacity has increased by 140%, aiming to serve millions annually.

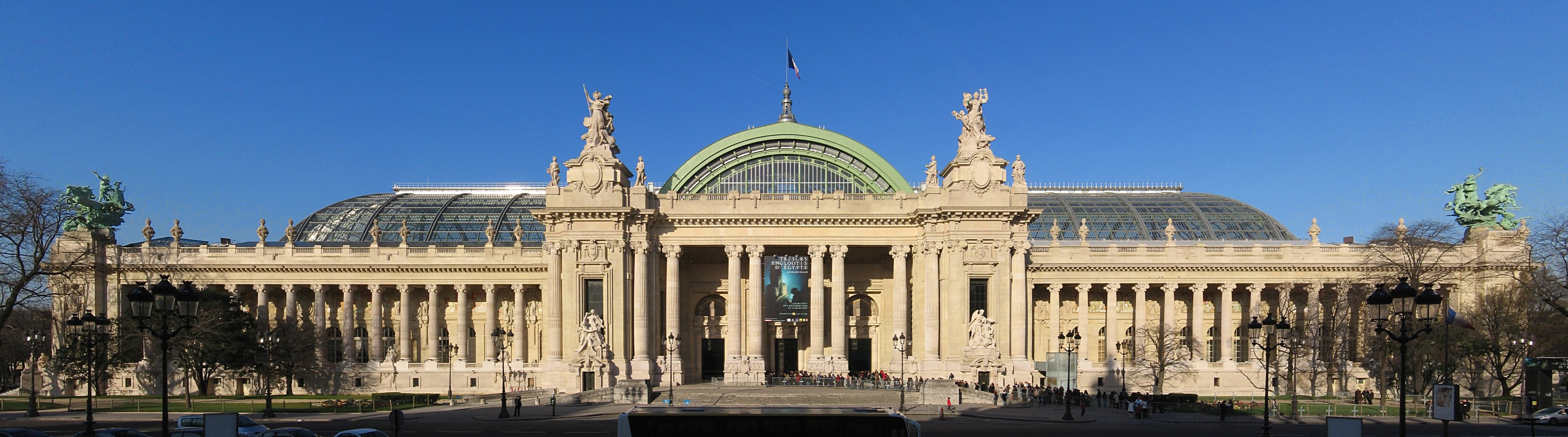
Panoramic view of the Grand Palais

== Restoration work ==
=== Conservation measures ===
The alarm was sounded in June 1993 after a riveting element detached from a height of almost thirty-five metres during the Design, miroir du siècle exhibition.

The Minister of Culture, Jacques Toubon, decided to "temporarily" close the site in November of that year, due to the danger of new rivets falling on the public. The installation of nets hung under the glass roof and the calling in of experts to remedy the situation were not enough to keep the building open to the public. Only the Galeries nationales and the Palais de la Découverte are once again available to the public, following the necessary safety work. The use of the nave was interrupted for twelve years. Six years during which the Ministry of Culture and Paris City Council were unable to agree on the division of responsibilities for saving the Grand Palais, which continued to deteriorate. This procrastination is linked not only to the relocation and rehousing of the administrations occupying the premises, but also to the substantial sums required for its restoration and upkeep.

Faced with pressure from private investors strongly interested in such a location in the heart of Paris, the building was protected as a historic monument in 2000 on the occasion of the centenary of the 1900 Universal Exhibition.

=== Pathologies ===
The behaviour of masonry and steelwork is influenced by several factors :

The building's foundations, partly made of oak piles supporting stone or lime concrete foundations, are subject to variations and a gradual lowering of the water table. Due to successive campaigns of redevelopment work on the road and the quayside along the Seine, this phenomenon causes the heads of the posts to wash out and then rot when they come into contact with the oxygen in the air. The first cracks appeared, as water infiltration through the glass roof caused the metal to slowly corrode. Another cause of decay is the hanging directly on the metal structure, as part of imposing decorations or exhibitions such as the Salon de l'Aéronautique, where balloons and airplanes are sometimes presented suspended. This causes premature aging of many metal elements.

=== Restoration project ===
The restoration work was managed between 2001 and 2007 by the Department of Architecture and Heritage (DAPA) of the Ministry of Culture and Communication. The contracting authority was awarded to the Public Establishment for the Management of Cultural Works (ÉMOC).

The work was carried out in two phases:

- Phase One (November 2001 – August 2004) : Underpinning of part of the foundations, accompanied by the removal, restoration, and replacement, from 2001 to 2004, of the two repoussé copper quadrigae and their Récipon iron reinforcement.

- Phase Two (2002 to the end of 2007) : Repair of the walls and other cracked masonry, the glass roof, and deformed or dilapidated roofs, with, since 2005, renovation of the facades, restoration of the large exterior mosaic frieze, and a second and final phase of foundation consolidation.

The budget for this project was 101.36 million euros (including 72.3 for the first phase). Funding was provided by the French government through the Ministry of Culture.

==== A short history of "Réséda" green ====
Even before the first renovations on the nave of the Grand Palais began, there were questions on what color to paint the metal structure, and whether it was even possible to restore it to its original state. Over time, numerous layers of paint covered all the elements, and by 2001, it was close to gray. A search ensued for the original product used, and luckily, the manufacturer who supplied the paint in 1900 was still in business. This was the Ripolin company, which still had archives from the period in question. The corresponding color chart was quickly found, and the name of the color was revealed: a "Réséda" green, of which there were three shades: pale, medium, and dark. The previous analyses clearly indicated the use of "pale reseda green."

== See also ==
- List of most visited art museums
- List of most visited museums
- List of tourist attractions in Paris
- Petit Palais
- Palais de la Découverte
- Pont Alexandre-III
- Louis Levacher
- Félix Charpentier, maker of a Grand Palais sculpture.
