= Our Lady of the Cape =

Marian title in Cap-de-la-Madeleine, Quebec, Canada

Coordinates: 46°22′5″N 72°29′51″W

Our Lady of the Cape Our Lady of the Rosary of the Cape
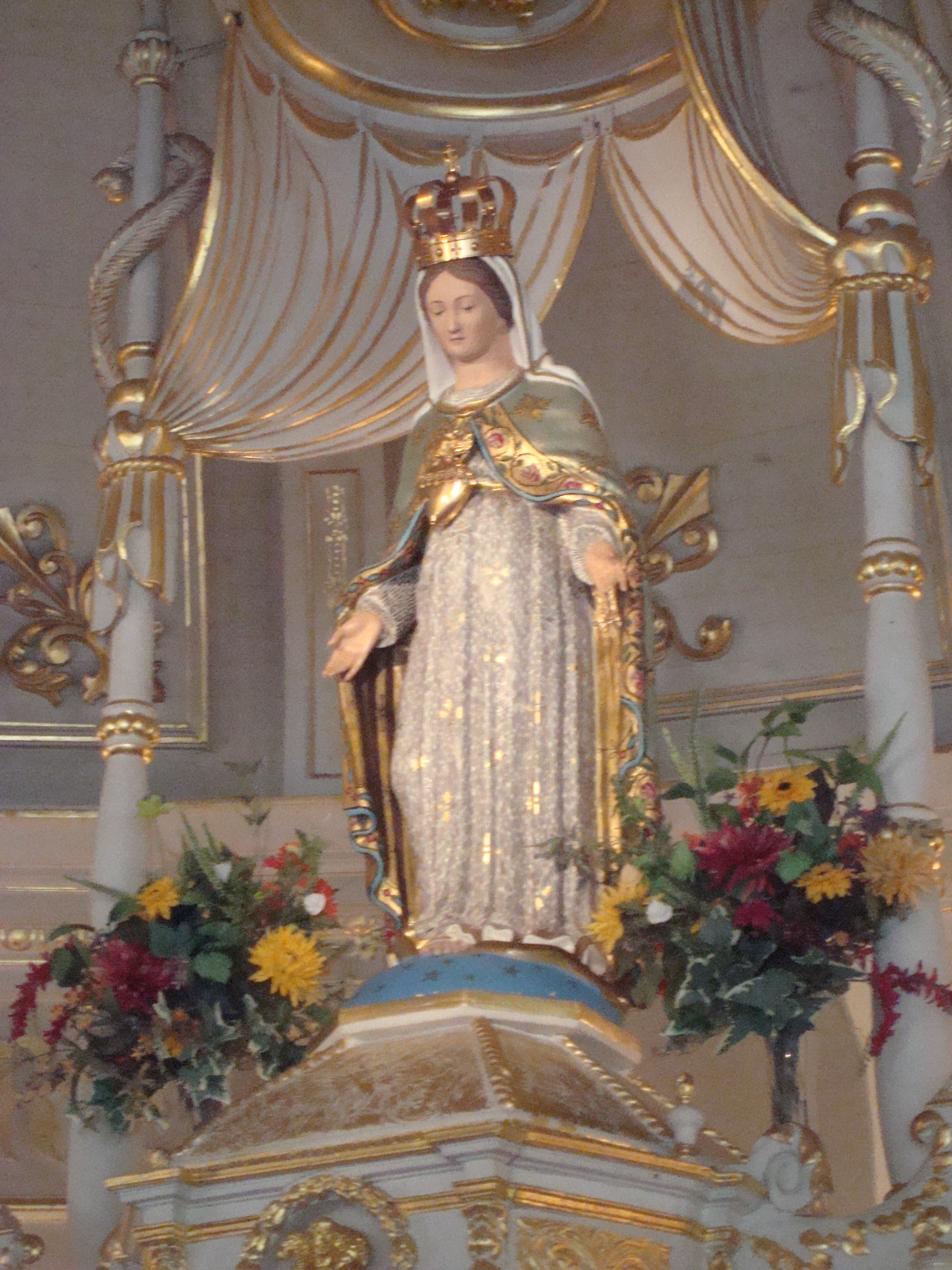
- The image enshrined on the high altar.
- Location: Trois-Rivières, Quebec
- Date: 1879
- Approval: Pope Pius X (Canonical coronation)
- Shrine: Sanctuary of Our Lady of Cape

Our Lady of the Cape (Notre-Dame-du-Cap in French) is a title given to Mary the Mother of God in Cap-de-la-Madeleine, Quebec Canada. The title refers specifically to a statue of the Blessed Mother which is currently located in the Old Shrine.

== History ==
Deep Marian Devotion existed in Cap-de-la-Madeleine since 1694 with the institution of the Brotherhood of the Rosary under Father Paul Vachon. In 1720, Father Vachon built a small fieldstone church to replace an earlier wooden structure. Father Vachon died in 1729, and was buried in the church. Without a resident pastor, the parish fell into decline. It was not until 1845 that the Bishop appointed Fr. Leandre Tourigny to be the settlement's resident priest.

In 1867, devotion to Mary was revived under Father Luc Desilets. After he had been deeply disappointed seeing a pig from nearby farms inside the church chewing a rosary left by some pilgrim, Fr. Desilets vowed to consecrate himself to the Blessed Virgin and re-introduce the rosary devotion to his parishioners.

== Description ==
In 1854, parishioner, Zepherin Dorval was heading for the gold fields and in hope of the protection of the Blessed Virgin, donated a statue which depicts Mary as she is said to have appeared to Catherine Laboure in Paris in 1830.

The statue represents Our Lady standing, in an attitude reminiscent of that of the Miraculous Medal. The eyes are modestly downcast; the facial expression pleasant. Her head is covered with a white veil; her garments gilded and ornamented. Her bare feet crush the serpent coiled on the top of a star-studded globe. The statue was originally placed in an alcove containing the altar of the Confraternities of the Holy Rosary, before being re-located to above the main altar.

== The Miracle of the Ice Bridge ==
During Fr. Desilets' revival of Marian devotion the number of people attending the parish church began to increase until the church was no longer large enough to hold the parishioners. In 1878 it was decided that a larger church was needed and that it would be built with stones from the opposite side of the St. Lawrence River which is approximately 1 1/4 miles across at Cap-de-la-Madeleine. The decision was made to bring the stones across the river on sleds once it had frozen in the winter. Unfortunately the 1878-1879 winter was unusually mild and the St. Lawrence did not freeze over as planned. This seemed to hinder plans for construction of the new church. Fr. Desilets instructed his congregation to pray the rosary in order to obtain ice to cross the river, he also promised Mary that if she interceded he would dedicate the Old Church (then dedicated to Mary Magdalene) to her instead. In March 1879 pieces of ice floated downstream from Lake St-Pierre, forming a "bridge" across the St. Lawrence River, and this miracle was attributed to the intercession of the Blessed Mother. This bridge was called the Rosary Bridge due to its connection with the prayer of the same name. For several days the parishioners poured water on the ice pieces in order to thicken the ice and form a path, which they then used to transport the stones across the river. Fr. Desilets upheld his promise and renamed the old church.

On June 22, 1888, the old stone church was formally dedicated to Our Lady, Queen of the Most Holy Rosary, and Dorval's statue ceremoniously relocated from the alcove to above the altar. That evening, while praying in the small church, Father Desilets, Franciscan friar Father Frédéric Janssoone O.F.M, and a parishioner, Pierre Lacroix, all seemed to see the statue open its eyes. This impression continued for five or ten minutes while the two priests moved about the church to view the statue from different perspective to test whether this was an optical illusion.

When word circulated of this unusual occurrence, the incidents of pilgrimages increased. Beginning in 1892, there were reports of cures.

== Pilgrimages ==
On 12 October 1904, Pope Pius X granted a canonical coronation for the statue, which was carried out by Bishop François-Xavier Cloutier. The "shamrock-girdled crown" was provided by the Irish community of Montreal. The image received a second coronation on 15 August 1954 by Cardinal Valerio Valeri, representing Pope Pius XII. Pope John Paul II stopped there in 1984, during a visit to Quebec. This inaugurated a tradition of annual pilgrimages for young people, known as Cap-Jeunesse.

There are many pilgrimages to the shrine, including hundreds by bus from Canada and the United States. At the end of July, members of the Quebec Italian community, stop at the basilica en route to Sainte-Anne-de-Beaupré for the feast of St Anne on July 26.

The Marie Reine de la Paix pilgrims converge every year from several points in Quebec, arriving on August 15, the Feast of the Assumption. Some travel on foot the 150 km from Sainte-Anne-de-Beaupré. Celebrations include torchlight processions and masses and hymns in creole for pilgrims from the Haitian community.

Participants in the Marie Reine Canada pilgrimage, established in 2003, travel 100 km on foot in three days from St.-Joseph-de-Lanoraie (Lanoraie, Quebec), through Maskinongé and Trois-Rivières, every Labour Day weekend.
