= Charles Thiffault =

Canadian ice hockey player and coach (1938–2025)

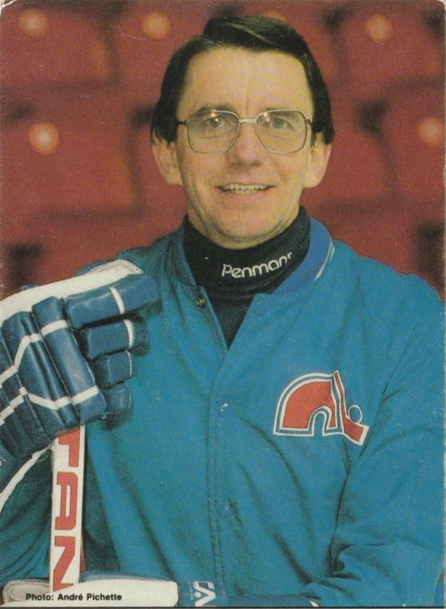
- Born: January 2, 1938 Cap-de-la-Madeleine, Quebec, Canada
- Died: May 18, 2025 (aged 87)
- Coached for: Montreal Canadiens; Quebec Nordiques; New York Rangers

Charles Thiffault (January 2, 1938 – May 18, 2025) was a Canadian assistant coach in the National Hockey League (NHL). He spent 15 years as an assistant coach with the Montreal Canadiens, Quebec Nordiques, and New York Rangers.

== Biography ==
Thiffault was born in Cap-de-la-Madeleine, Quebec (now Trois-Rivières). He graduated from the University of Ottawa with a degree in physical education in 1960. He had a doctorate in physical education from the University of Southern California. He was a resident of Sherbrooke, Quebec.

Thiffault was an assistant coach for Team Canada at the 1997 Maccabiah Games in Israel.

He coached first at the University of Sherbrooke and Laval University.

Thiffault won the Stanley Cup with Montreal in 1993. Prior to joining the Canadiens, he was an assistant coach for the New York Rangers and the Quebec Nordiques before that. He was head coach of the Rouyn-Noranda Huskies for one season. He also coached the national teams of Switzerland and Italy.

Thiffault died on May 18, 2025 through medical assistance in dying. He was 87.
