= Palais de la Découverte =

Science museum in Paris, France

Coordinates: 48°51′58″N 2°18′39″E

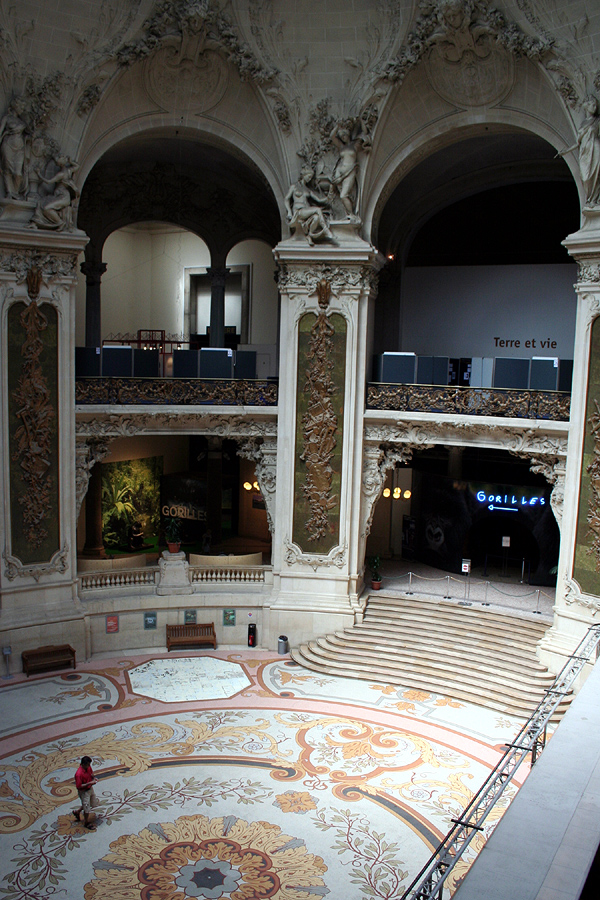
Entry hall, Palais de la Découverte

The Palais de la Découverte (French pronunciation: [palɛ də la dekuvɛʁt], lit. 'Discovery Palace') is a science museum located in the Grand Palais, in the 8th arrondissement on Avenue Franklin D. Roosevelt, Paris, France. It is open daily except Monday; an admission fee is charged.

The museum was created in 1937 by Jean Baptiste Perrin (awarded the Nobel Prize in Physics, 1926) during an international exhibition on "Arts and techniques in modern life". In 1938, the French government decided to convert the facility into a new museum, which now occupies 25,000 square metres within the west wing of the Grand Palais (Palais d'Antin) built for the Exposition Universelle (1900) to designs by architect Albert-Félix-Théophile Thomas. On January 9, 1940, a new decree linked museum, this time to the University of Paris.

In 1972, decree no. 72-367 of April 28 transformed the Palais de la Découverte into an autonomous public establishment. In 1990, it received the status of large establishment following decree no. 90-99 of January 25.

In January 2010, the museum was merged with the Cité des Sciences et de l'Industrie under one institution named universcience with two locations.

Today the museum contains permanent exhibits for mathematics, physics, astronomy, chemistry, geology, and biology, featuring interactive experiments with commentaries by lecturers. It includes a Zeiss planetarium with 15-metre dome.

Under renovation in the early 2020s, its activities continued at Les Étincelles, 186 rue Saint-Charles, in the 15th arrondissement.

== Pi room ==
The museum contains a circular room known as the "pi room". On its wall is inscribed 707 digits of the number π. The digits are large wooden characters attached to the dome-like ceiling. The digits were based on an 1873 calculation by English mathematician William Shanks, which included an error in the 528th digit. The error was detected in 1946, and corrected in 1949.

== See also ==
- List of museums in Paris
- List of works by Alexandre Falguière
