= Venus of Laussel =

Sculpture of a nude woman

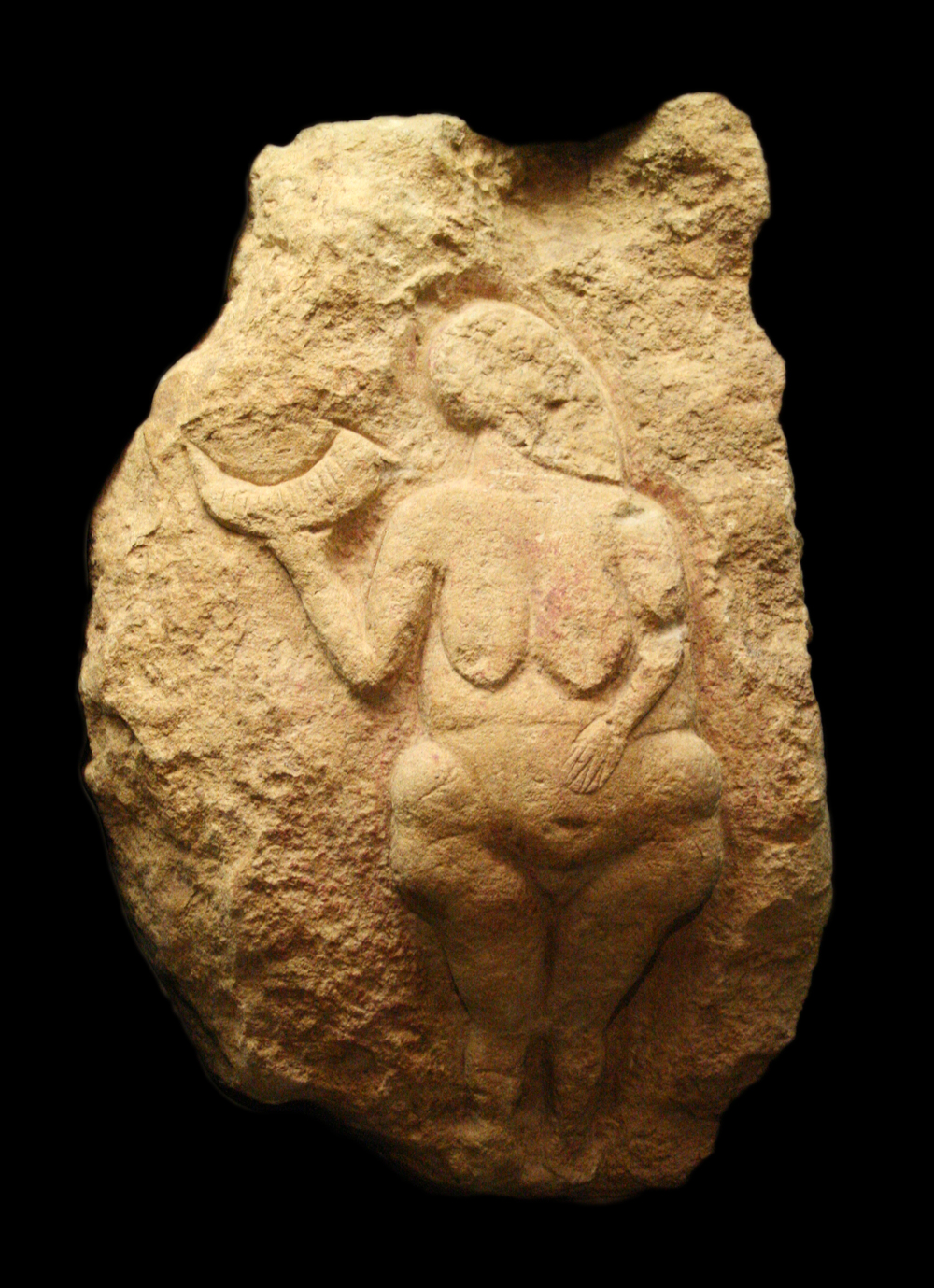
- Tablet on display in the British Museum
- Material: Limestone
- Size: Height: 46 cm
- Created: c. 23,000 BC
- Discovered: 1911; Marquay, Dordogne, France
- Discovered by: Jean-Gaston Lalanne
- Present location: Musée d'Aquitaine, Bordeaux, France

The Venus of Laussel is an 18.11-inch-high (46.0-centimetre) limestone bas-relief of a nude woman. It is painted with red ochre and was carved into the limestone of a rock shelter (Abri de Laussel) in Marquay, Dordogne, southwestern France. Approximately 25,000 years old, the carving is associated with the Gravettian culture of the Upper Paleolithic. It is currently displayed in the Musée d'Aquitaine in Bordeaux, France.

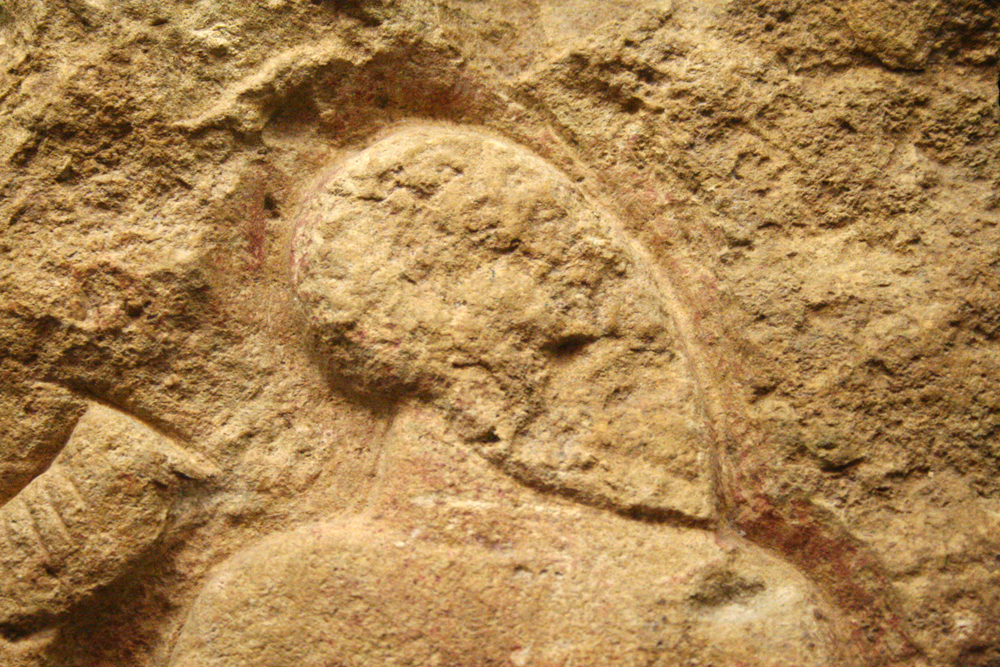
Detail of the head.

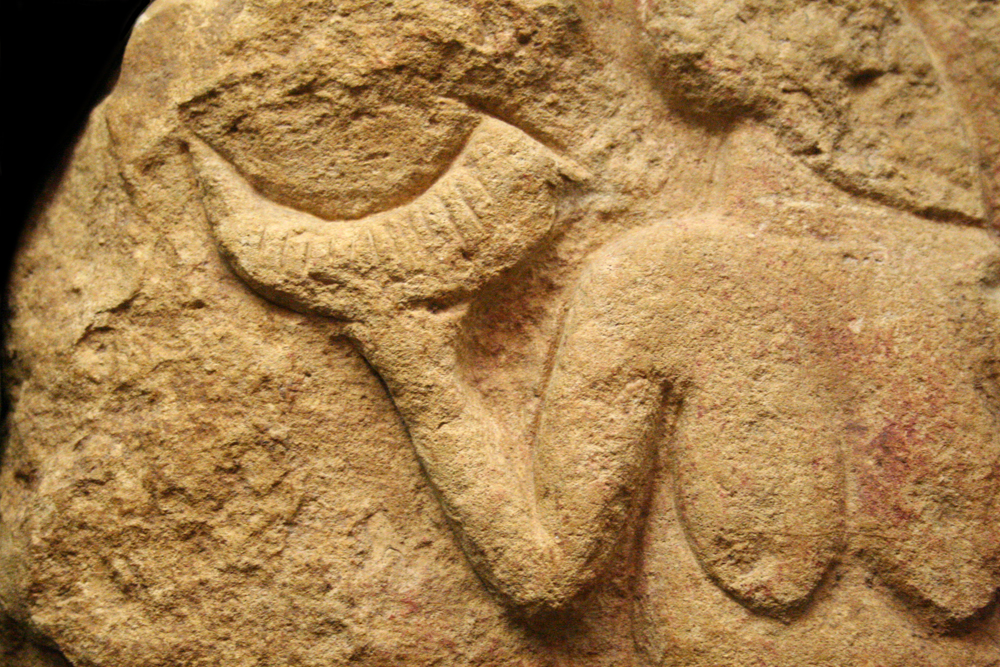
Detail of the right arm and the horn.

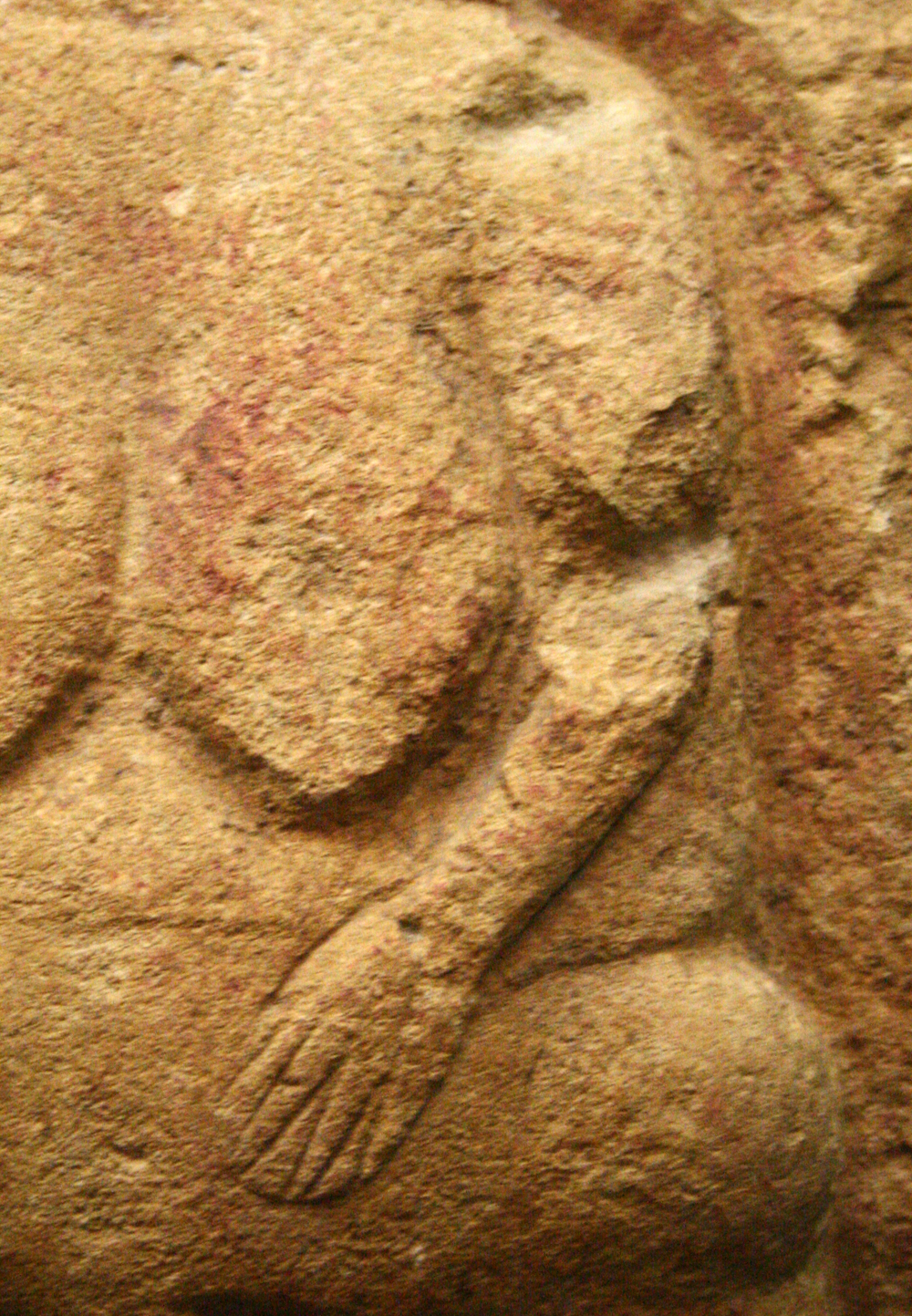
Detail of the left arm and hand.

== Description ==
The figure holds a bison horn, or possibly a cornucopia, in one hand, which has thirteen notches. She has large breasts, a great stomach, and wide hips. There is a "Y" on her thigh and her faceless head is turned toward the horn. The lower relief was covered in red ochre.

== Discovery and display ==
The relief was discovered in 1911 by Jean-Gaston Lalanne, doctor of sciences and neuropsychiatrist in Bordeaux. It was carved into large block of limestone in a rock shelter (Abri de Laussel) at the commune of Marquay in the Dordogne department of south-western France. The limestone block fell off the wall of the shelter. It was brought to the Musée d'Aquitaine in Bordeaux.

== Meaning ==
The figure and the horn are considered significant in figurative studies of Paleolithic art. There are many similarly formed Venus figurines, such as the Venus of Willendorf, and other representations of female figures, said to be of potential significance in Eurasian prehistoric religion. Some suggest the color and the number of notches on the horn may symbolize the number of lunar months or menstrual cycles in one year, or the number of days from menstruation to ovulation.

== See also ==
- Art of the Upper Paleolithic
- List of Stone Age art
