= Neuvy-sur-Barangeon =

- Commune
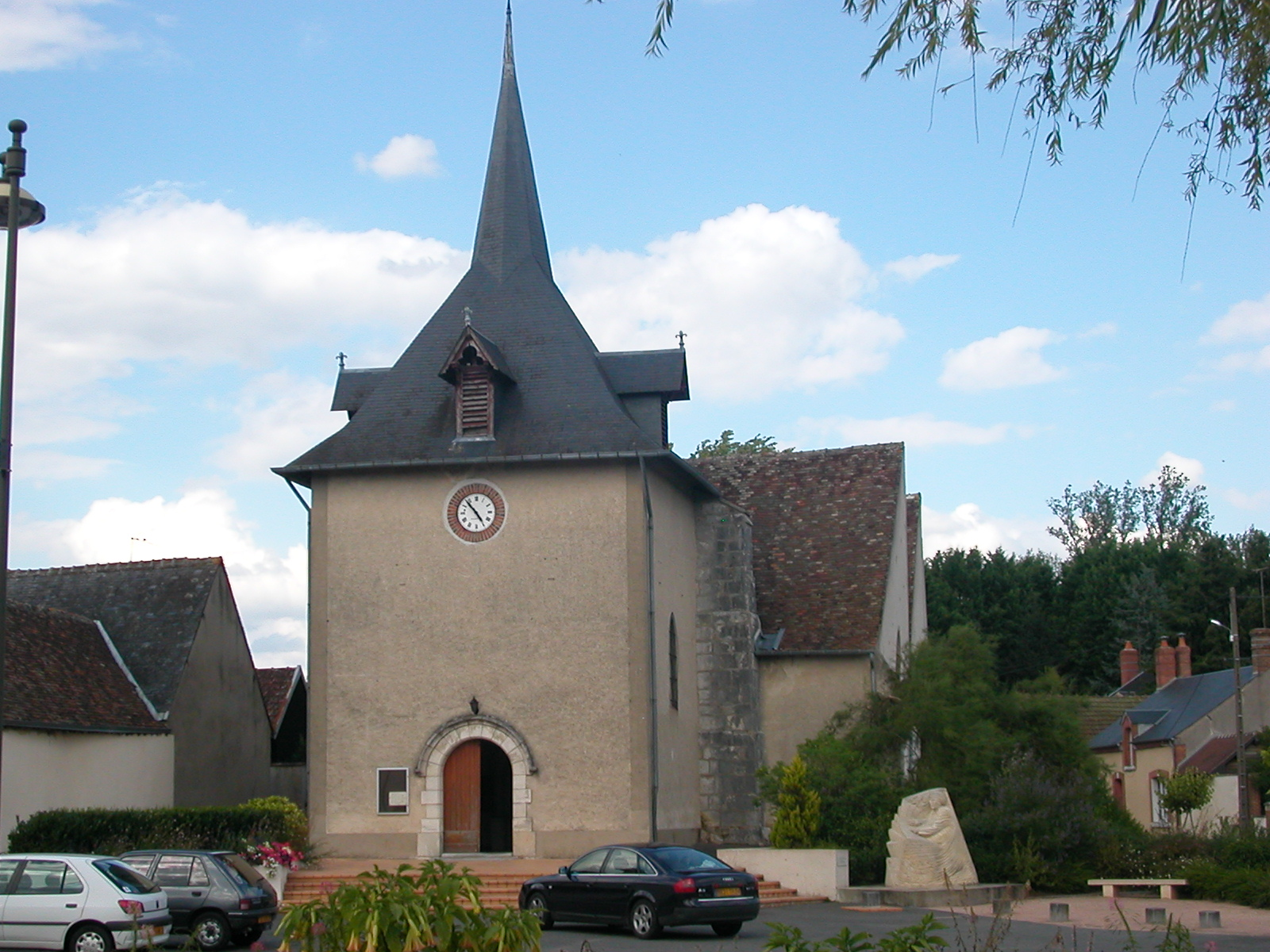
- The church in Neuvy-sur-Barangeon

- Coat of arms
- Location of Neuvy-sur-Barangeon
- Location within France Location within Centre-Val de Loire
- Coordinates: 47°18′58″N 2°15′17″E
- Country: France
- Region: Centre-Val de Loire
- Department: Cher
- Arrondissement: Vierzon
- Canton: Aubigny-sur-Nère
- Intercommunality: CC Vierzon-Sologne-Berry

Government
  - Mayor (2020–2026): Marie-Pierre Cassard
- Area^{1}: 67.34 km^{2} (26.00 sq mi)
- Elevation: 145 m (476 ft)
- Highest elevation: 242 m (794 ft)
- Lowest elevation: 129 m (423 ft)
- Population (2023): 1,126
  - Density: 16.72/km^{2} (43.31/sq mi)
- Time zone: UTC+01:00 (CET)
  - Summer (DST): UTC+02:00 (CEST)
- INSEE/Postal code: 18165 /18330
- ^{1} French Land Register data, which excludes lakes, ponds, glaciers > 1 km^{2} (0.386 sq mi or 247 acres) and river estuaries.

Neuvy-sur-Barangeon (French pronunciation: [nøvi syʁ baʁɑ̃ʒɔ̃]) is a commune in the Cher department in central France.

== Population ==
Historical population
Year	Pop.	±% p.a.
1968	1,210	—
1975	1,107	−1.26%
1982	1,219	+1.39%
1990	1,221	+0.02%
1999	1,162	−0.55%
2007	1,241	+0.83%
2012	1,253	+0.19%
2017	1,156	−1.60%
2023	1,126	−0.44%
Source: INSEE

== See also ==
- Château du Grand Chavanon
- Communes of the Cher department
