= Marquay, Dordogne =

Marquay
- Commune
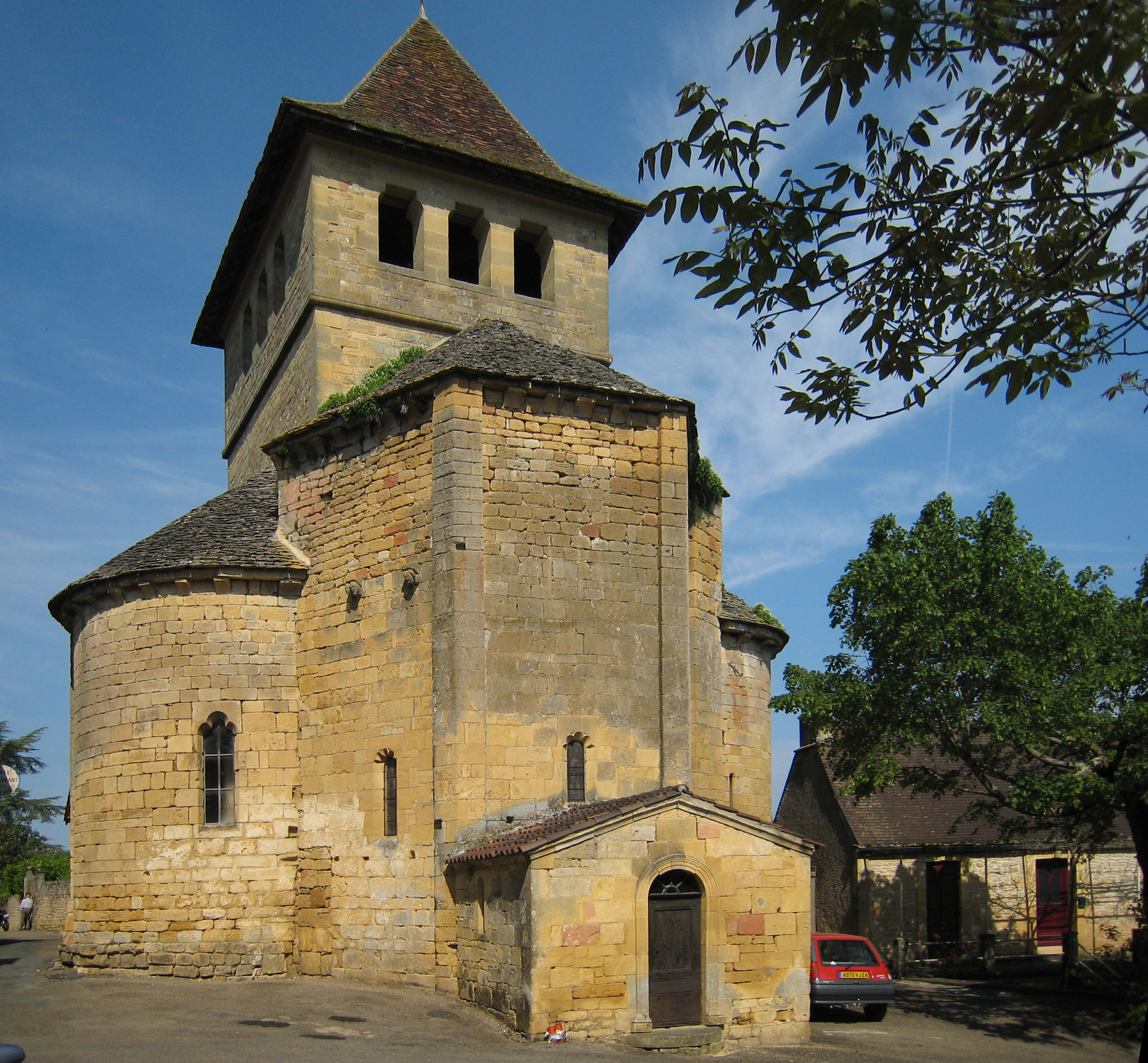
- The church in Marquay

- Coat of arms
- Location of Marquay
- Location within France Location within Nouvelle-Aquitaine
- Coordinates: 44°56′41″N 1°08′05″E
- Country: France
- Region: Nouvelle-Aquitaine
- Department: Dordogne
- Arrondissement: Sarlat-la-Canéda
- Canton: Sarlat-la-Canéda

Government
  - Mayor (2020–2026): Jean-Luc Astié
- Area^{1}: 24.27 km^{2} (9.37 sq mi)
- Elevation: 225 m (738 ft)
- Highest elevation: 288 m (945 ft)
- Lowest elevation: 80 m (260 ft)
- Population (2023): 588
  - Density: 24.2/km^{2} (62.7/sq mi)
- Time zone: UTC+01:00 (CET)
  - Summer (DST): UTC+02:00 (CEST)
- INSEE/Postal code: 24255 /24620
- ^{1} French Land Register data, which excludes lakes, ponds, glaciers > 1 km^{2} (0.386 sq mi or 247 acres) and river estuaries.

Marquay (French pronunciation: [maʁkɛ]; Occitan: Marcais) is a commune in the Dordogne department in Nouvelle-Aquitaine in southwestern France.

== Population ==
Historical population
Year	Pop.	±% p.a.
1968	442	—
1975	406	−1.21%
1982	419	+0.45%
1990	473	+1.53%
1999	477	+0.09%
2007	558	+1.98%
2012	582	+0.85%
2017	577	−0.17%
2023	588	+0.32%
Source: INSEE

== See also ==
- Château de Puymartin
- Venus of Laussel, discovered in Marquay
- Communes of the Dordogne department
