= Albert-Félix-Théophile Thomas =

French architect

Albert-Félix-Théophile Thomas (French pronunciation: [albɛʁ feliks teɔfil tɔma]; 11 August 1847 – 1907) was a French architect.

Thomas was born in Marseille, and was a student of Alexis Paccard and Leon Vaudoyer at the École des Beaux-Arts in Paris. He won the first Prix de Rome in 1870, and became the youngest winner of the French Academy in Rome from 15 February 1871 to 31 December 1874. In 1875 he studied the Temple of Apollo at Miletus. His study of the Temple of Athena at Priene earned him a medal at the Exposition Universelle (1878).

Thomas participated in the design and construction of the Grand Palais in Paris from 1896 to 1900, particularly the west wing, which in 1937 became the Palais de la Découverte. He also designed and constructed the Château du Grand Chavanon, which was later owned by the president and later emperor of the Central African Republic, Jean-Bédel Bokassa. He died in Paris.
