= Notre-Dame-du-Cap Basilica =

Coordinates: 46°22′5″N 72°29′51″W

- Basilica of Notre-Dame-du-Cap
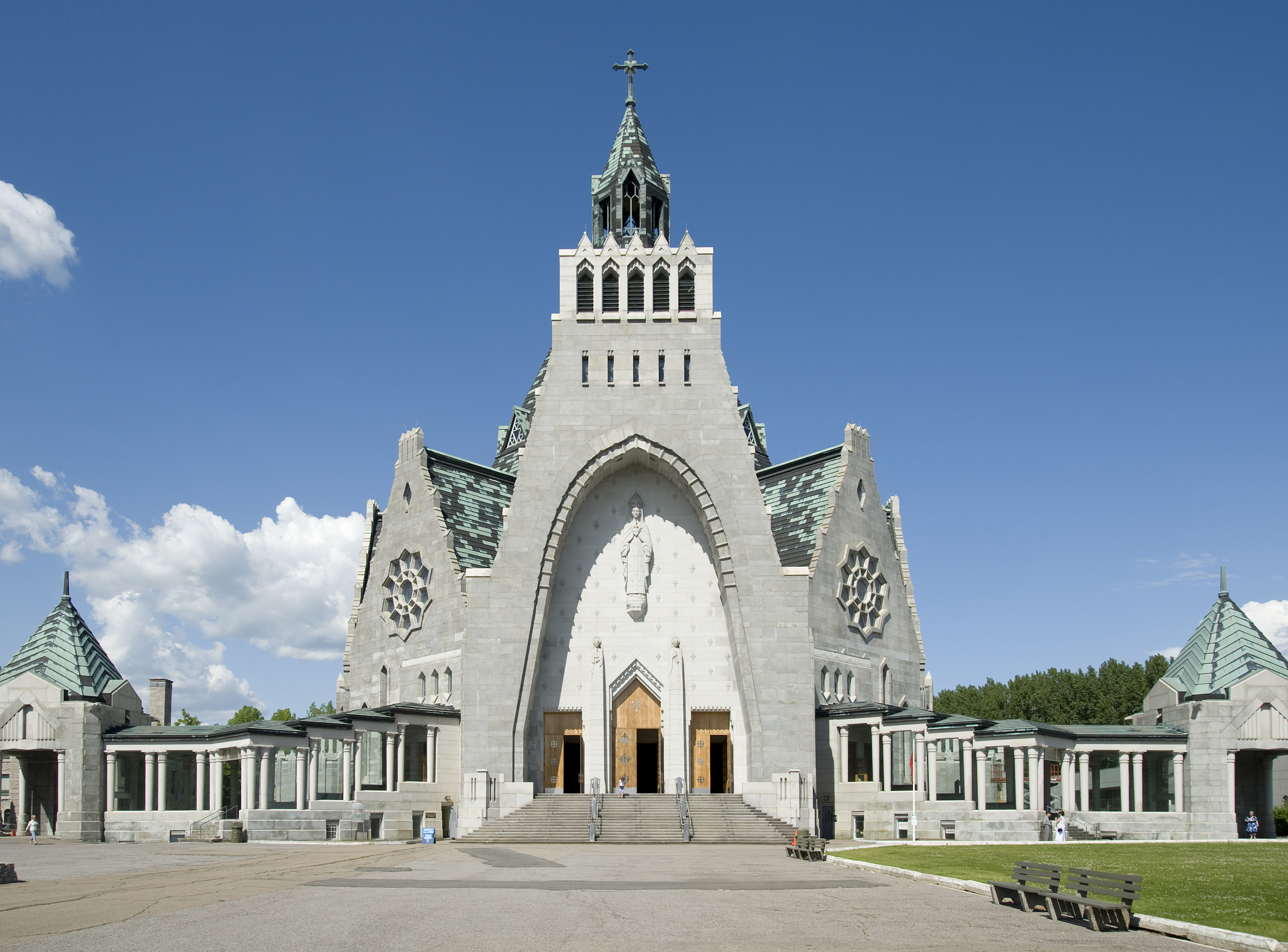
- Notre-Dame-du-Cap Basilica
- Notre-Dame-du-Cap Basilica
- Location: Trois-Rivières, Quebec
- Country: Canada
- Denomination: Roman Catholic

History
- Status: Minor basilica

Architecture
- Functional status: Active
- Architectural type: Norman-Gothic

The Basilica of Notre-Dame-du-Cap is a minor basilica in Trois-Rivières, Quebec, Canada. It is Canada's national shrine to the Blessed Virgin Mary, and one of the country's six national shrines. Each year, the site is visited by thousands of Catholic pilgrims.

== History ==
The first church in the district of Cap-de-la-Madeleine was a small wooden structure built in 1659. In 1694, the first resident pastor, Father Paul Vachon, established the Confraternity of the Most Holy Rosary at Cap de la Madeleine. The wooden building was replaced by a fieldstone church in 1720. The hand hewn beams from the wooden church were used in the construction of the new stone church. Canon Vachon died in 1729 and is buried in the church.

For a long time the parish was without a resident pastor and fell into neglect. In 1867, Father Luc Desilets, pastor at Cap-de-la-Madeleine, re-introduced the praying of the rosary and promoted it among his parishioners. A more regular pastoral presence resulted in increased attendance, and a larger church was needed.

Initially, construction of a new church was hampered by the difficulty of transporting material. However, in mid-March 1879, despite it being an unusually mild winter, a small section of the St. Lawrence River froze sufficiently that, by adding additional snow and water, Father Louis-Eugene Duguay, and some parishioners were able to construct a narrow mile-and-a-half long ice bridge. The ice held for a full week and allowed the building material to be hauled across on horse-drawn sledges. The people attributed their success to the intercession of the Blessed Mother. In October 1880 the finished third church was dedicated to Sainte-Marie-Madeleine.

True to a promise made to the Blessed Virgin, instead of demolishing the old stone church, Desilets dedicated it to Our Lady, Queen of the Most Holy Rosary. The first pilgrimage to the Sanctuary was made on May 7, 1883. Desilets died shortly thereafter, and Duguay became pastor. Janssoone took over the responsibility of managing the shrine, and installed a Way of the Cross. Bronze statues depicted the stations. As the parish work and number of pilgrims increased, they asked the bishop to appoint a custodian to take over the shrine. In 1902, the Missionary Oblates of Mary Immaculate became guardians of the Shrine. Beginning in 1906, they installed a Way of the Rosary. The path leads to a series of bronze statues, cast in France, each representing one of the fifteen traditional mysteries of the rosary.

In October 1904, Pope Pius X authorized the canonical coronation of Our Lady of the Cape. In 1964, the present basilica was inaugurated, and the sanctuary officially became a minor basilica. The Missionary Oblates of Mary Immaculate continue to operate the shrine.

Pope John Paul II visited in September 1984.

Father Janssoone was declared blessed by Pope John Paul II on September 25, 1988.

== Architecture ==
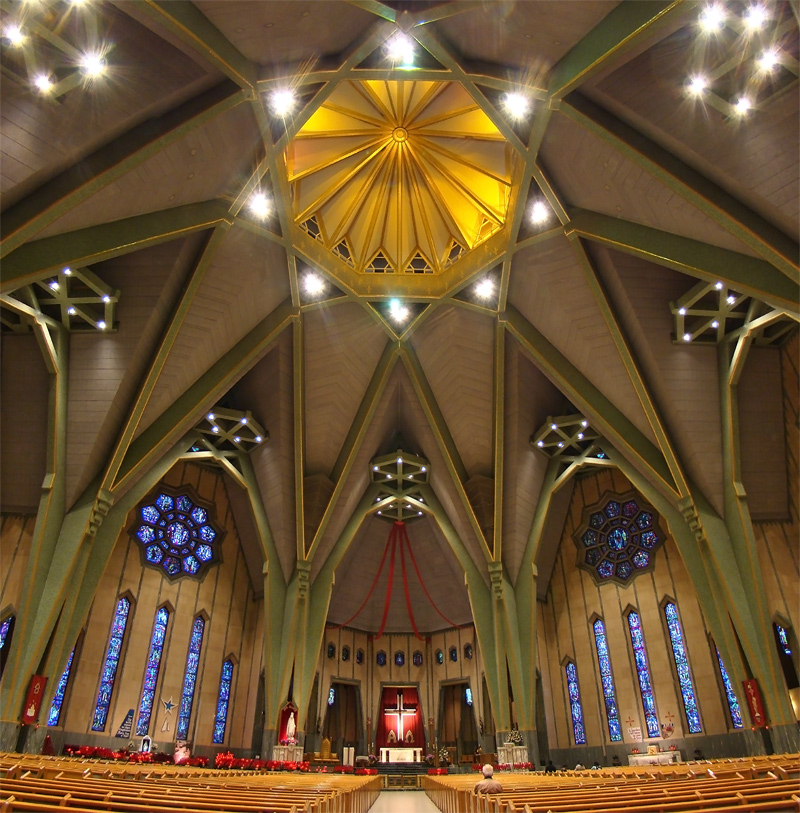
Interior of the basilica. Stained-glass windows may be seen in the background.

The church that was completed in 1888, was demolished in 1963 to make way for the square in front of the present basilica. Some of its stones were kept to make an addition to the first church in 1973. The basilica, designed by architect Adrien Dufresne, opened in 1964 and can accommodate up to 1,660 people. Reinforced concrete arches outline the building.

The Casavant organ consists of 5,425 pipes. The stained glass windows are by Dutch Oblate Father Jan Tillemans.

== See also ==
- Our Lady of the Cape
