= Quebec Route 339 =

Highway in Quebec, Canada

Route 339

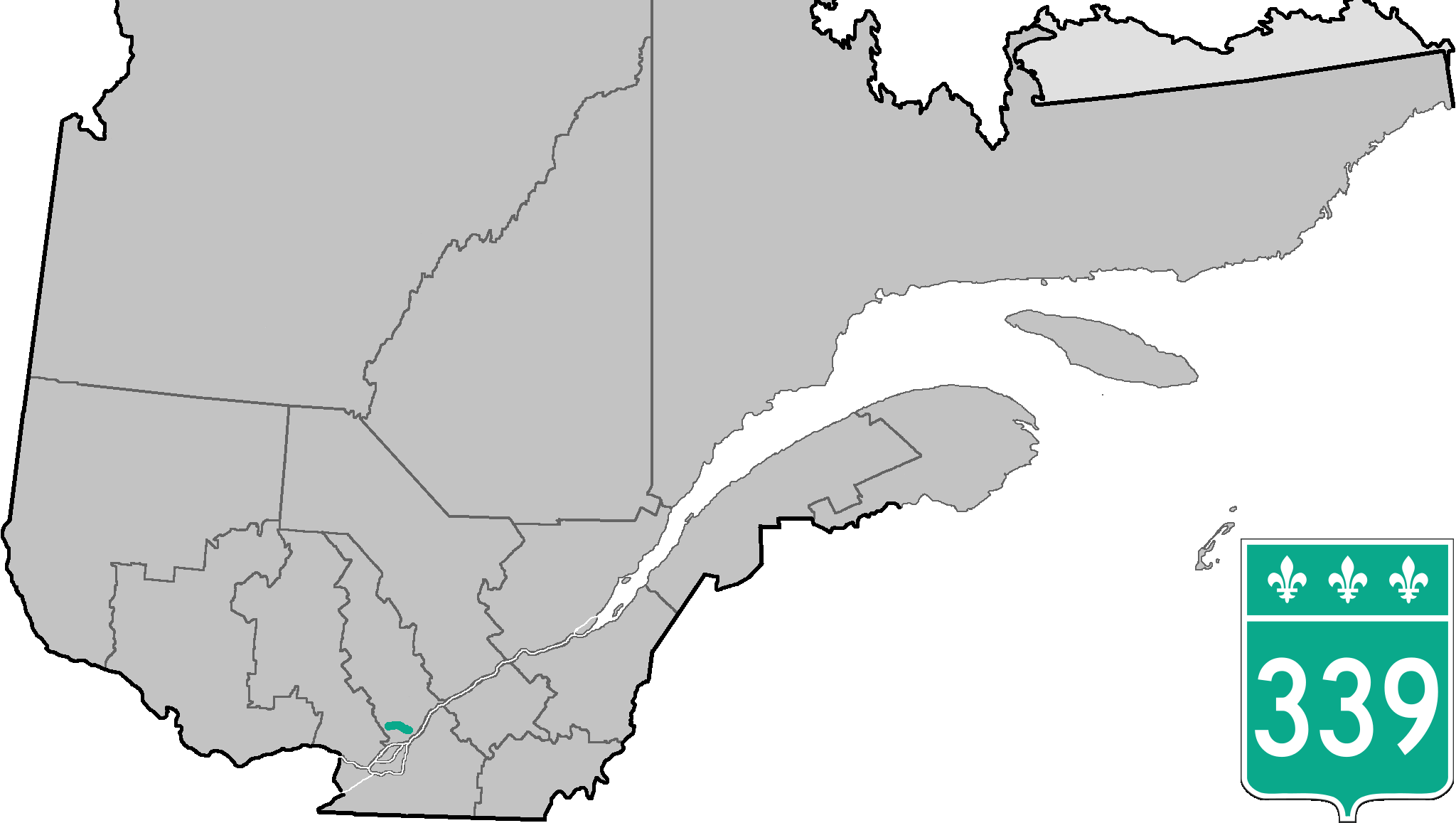

Route information
- Maintained by Transports Québec
- Length: 31.7 km (19.7 mi)

Major junctions
- South end: R-344 in L'Assomption
- R-341 in L'Épiphanie; A-25 / R-125 in Saint-Roch-Ouest
- North end: R-158 / R-335 / R-337 in Saint-Lin-Laurentides

Location
- Country: Canada
- Province: Quebec
- Major cities: L'Assomption, Saint-Roch-de-l'Achigan, Saint-Lin-Laurentides

Highway system
- Quebec provincial highways; Autoroutes; List; Former
← R-338	→ R-340

Route 339 is a provincial highway that is situated in the Lanaudière region of Quebec. It runs from the junction of Route 344 in L'Assomption northeast of Montreal and ends at the junctions of Route 158, Route 335 and Route 337 in Saint-Lin-Laurentides, 32 kilometers to the north.

== Municipalities along Route 339 ==
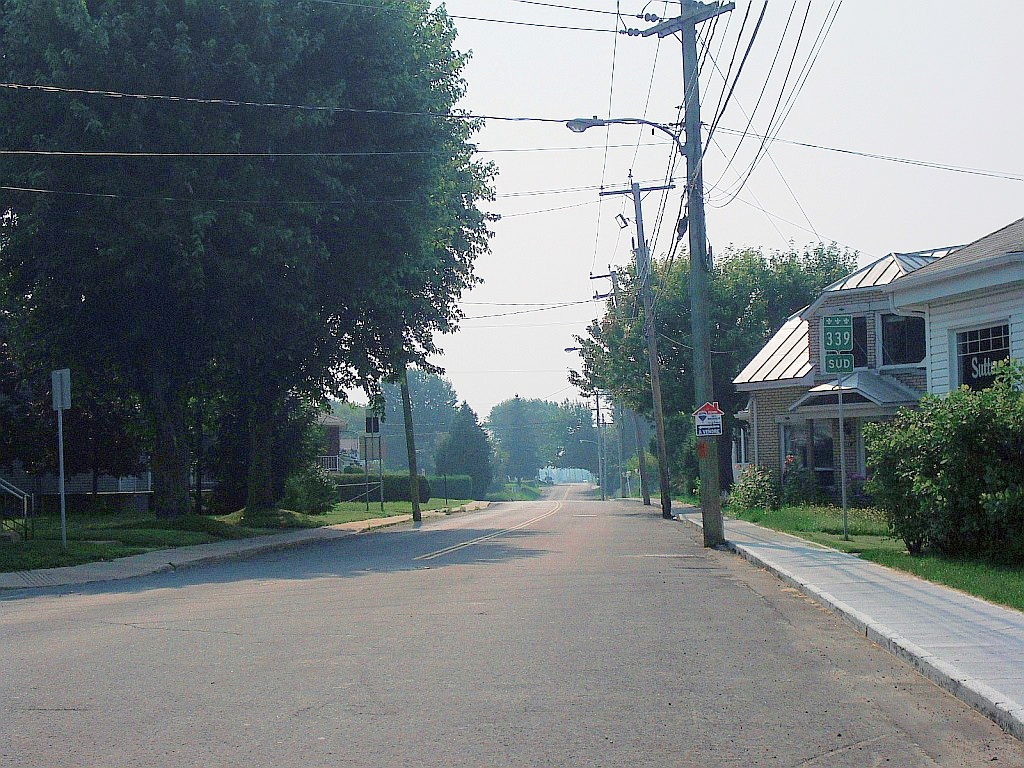
Quebec Route 339 in Saint-Lin-Laurentides

- L'Assomption
- L'Épiphanie
- Saint-Roch-de-l'Achigan
- Saint-Roch-Ouest
- Saint-Lin-Laurentides

== Major intersections ==
RCM	Location	km	mi	Destinations	Notes
L'Assomption	L'Assomption	0	0.0	R-344 – Repentigny	Southern terminus
L'Assomption	L'Assomption	7.6	4.7	R-341 – L'Assomption, Saint-Jacques	
Montcalm	Saint-Roch-Ouest	22.1	13.7	A-25 north – Saint-Esprit	Exit 44 (A-25)
Montcalm	Saint-Roch-Ouest	22.7	14.1	R-125 south to A-25 south – Mascouche	
Montcalm	Saint-Lin-Laurentides	31.7	19.7	R-158 / R-335 / R-337 – Saint-Esprit, Sainte-Sophie, Sainte-Anne-des-Plaines, Saint-Calixte, Terrebonne, Sainte-Julienne	Northern terminus
1.000 mi = 1.609 km; 1.000 km = 0.621 mi

== See also ==
- List of Quebec provincial highways
