= Quebec Route 125 =

Highway in Quebec, Canada

Coordinates: 45.8069°N 73.615°W

Route 125

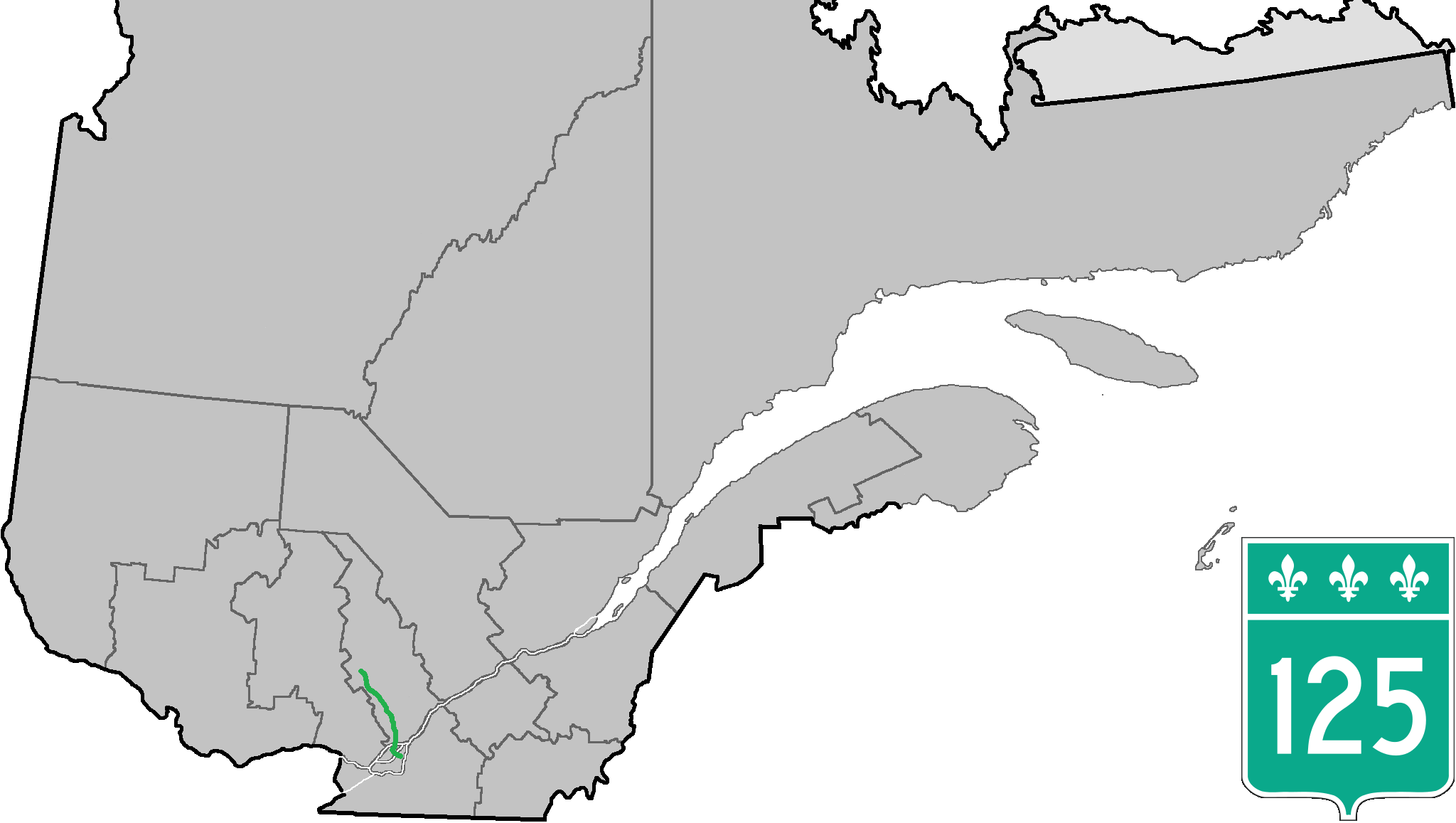

Route information
- Maintained by Transports Québec
- Length: 132.6 km (82.4 mi)
- History: Route 18

Major junctions
- South end: R-138 in Montréal
- A-40 (TCH) in Montréal; A-440 in Laval; A-25 in Laval and Terrebonne; A-25 / R-158 in Saint-Esprit
- North end: Mont-Tremblant National Park in Saint-Donat

Location
- Country: Canada
- Province: Quebec

Highway system
- Quebec provincial highways; Autoroutes; List; Former
← R-122	→ R-131

Route 125 is a Quebec highway running from Montreal (on Pie-IX Boulevard, near the Olympic Stadium) to Saint-Donat, Lanaudière. The southern section of Route 125 runs parallel to Autoroute 25 in Laval, Mascouche, and Terrebonne. At Saint-Esprit, the Autoroute ends, and Route 125 continues northwards until the entrance to the Mont-Tremblant National Park, north of Saint-Donat.

== Trace ==
Route 125, a road parallel to the Autoroute 25, begins at the corner of Sherbrooke Street East (Route 138) in Montreal and is called "Boulevard Pie-IX." Then, it crosses Rivière des Prairies and becomes the famous Pix-IX Expressway. It keeps this name until it meets with Autoroute 440. Between Pie-IX Bridge and Autoroute 440, it has a highway configuration and has two lanes in each direction that are separated by a median. The streets are crossed by an overpass, and the lanes are connected by access ramps.

Route 125 then crosses the Île Jésus (Laval) and the Mille Îles River on the Sophie-Masson Bridge and arrives in Terrebonne. After its concurrency with Autoroute 440, it is more like a secondary road and is quite narrow until Route 344, when it forms a short concurrency before it joins Montée Masson, in downtown Terrebonne. From there, it heads to the city of Mascouche, of which it is its main road. Once past the built-up area of Mascouche, it looks again like a narrow secondary road and does not even have a double yellow line.

When Route 125 reaches Saint-Roch-de-l'Achigan, it is a little-used country road. At the junction of Route 339, it takes it to form a short concurrency with the Autoroute 25 at its northern end. From Saint-Esprit, Route 125 becomes the main traffic route to the northwest of Lanaudière since Autoroute 25 ends at Saint-Esprit. Route 125 heads towards Sainte-Julienne, where it forms a short concurrency with Route 337 to the vicinity of Rawdon.

After Chertsey, Route 125 is a four-lane divided road for about 10 km in Entrelacs. It then reaches Saint-Donat before it ends at the entrance of Mont-Tremblant National Park.

== Municipalities along Route 125 ==
- Montreal (Rosemont–La Petite-Patrie / Villeray–Saint-Michel–Parc-Extension / Montréal-Nord)
- Laval
- Terrebonne
- Mascouche
- Saint-Roch-de-l'Achigan
- Saint-Roch-Ouest
- Saint-Esprit
- Sainte-Julienne
- Rawdon
- Chertsey
- Entrelacs
- Notre-Dame-de-la-Merci
- Saint-Donat

== Major intersections ==
RCM	Location	km	mi	Exit	Destinations	Notes
Montréal	Montréal	0.0	0.0		Rue Sherbrooke (R-138) / Boulevard Pie-IX	A-125 southern terminus; Boulevard Pie-IX continues south
Montréal	Montréal	3.9	2.4		A-40 (TCH) – Québec, Ottawa, Gatineau	A-40 exit 76
Rivière des Prairies		8.7– 9.1	5.4– 5.7	Pont Pie-IX (Pie IX Bridge)		
Laval		9.5	5.9	–	Boulevard de la Concorde / Boulevard Lévesque	Interchange
Laval		10.4	6.5	–	Boulevard Saint-Martin	Interchange; former R-148 west
Laval		11.1	6.9	–	Boulevard Lite	Interchange; southbound exit and northbound entrance; northbound exit via Avenue Laplace
Laval		11.5	7.1	30	A-440 west / Boulevard Pie-IX north	A-440 exit 30; south end of A-440 concurrency; exit numbers follow A-440
Laval		12.5	7.8	31	Montée Saint-François	
Laval		14.9– 16.0	9.3– 9.9	34; 35	A-25 / A-440 ends – Terrebonne, Montréal	A-440 northern terminus and concurrency; A-25 exit 17; no access from A-25 north to R-125 north; signed as exits 34 (A-440 to R-125) and 35 (A-440 to A-25)
Rivière des Mille Îles		20.4– 20.9	12.7– 13.0	Pont Sophie-Masson (Sophie Masson Bridge)		
Les Moulins	Terrebonne	21.2	13.2		R-344 east (Rue Saint-Louis)	South end of R-344 concurrency; R-125 follows Rue Saint-Louis
Les Moulins	Terrebonne	21.4	13.3		R-344 west (Rue Saint-Louis)	North end of R-344 concurrency; R-125 follows Montée Masson
Les Moulins	Terrebonne	23.7	14.7		A-25 to A-640 / Grande Allée – Montréal, Rawdon	A-25 exit 24
Montcalm	Saint-Roch-Ouest	43.1	26.8	44	R-339 / Ancienne Route 125 – Saint-Roch-de-l'Achigan, Saint-Lin-Laurentides A-25 south – Montréal	South end of A-25 concurrency; exit numbers follow A-25; R-125 becomes unsigned
Montcalm	Saint-Esprit	46.3	28.8	46	R-158 west – Saint-Lin-Laurentides, Saint-Jérôme	South end of R-158 concurrency; A-25 becomes unsigned; R-125 signage resumes
Montcalm	Saint-Esprit	49.9	31.0		A-25 ends / R-158 east – Saint-Jacques, Joliette	A-25 northern terminus; north end of A-25 / R-158 concurrency
Montcalm	Sainte-Julienne	58.3	36.2		R-337 south / R-346 east – Saint-Calixte, Saint-Liguori	South end of R-337 concurrency; R-346 western terminus
Montcalm	Sainte-Julienne	63.1	39.2		R-337 north – Rawdon	North end of R-337 concurrency
Matawinie	Rawdon	67.3	41.8		R-348 east – Rawdon	
Matawinie	Rawdon	74.1	46.0		R-341 south – Rawdon	
Matawinie	Rawdon – Chertsey boundary	77.4	48.1		R-335 south – Saint-Calixte	
Matawinie	Notre-Dame-de-la-Merci	105.2	65.4		R-347 south – Saint-Côme	
Matawinie	Saint-Donat	120.1	74.6		R-329 south – Lantier, Sainte-Agathe-des-Monts	
Matawinie	Saint-Donat	132.6	82.4		Parc national du Mont-Tremblant	R-125 northern terminus; continues into Mont-Tremblant National Park
1.000 mi = 1.609 km; 1.000 km = 0.621 mi: Concurrency terminus; Incomplete access

== See also ==
- List of Quebec provincial highways
- Pie IX Bridge
- Sophie Masson Bridge
