= Quebec Route 346 =

Highway in Quebec, Canada

Route 346

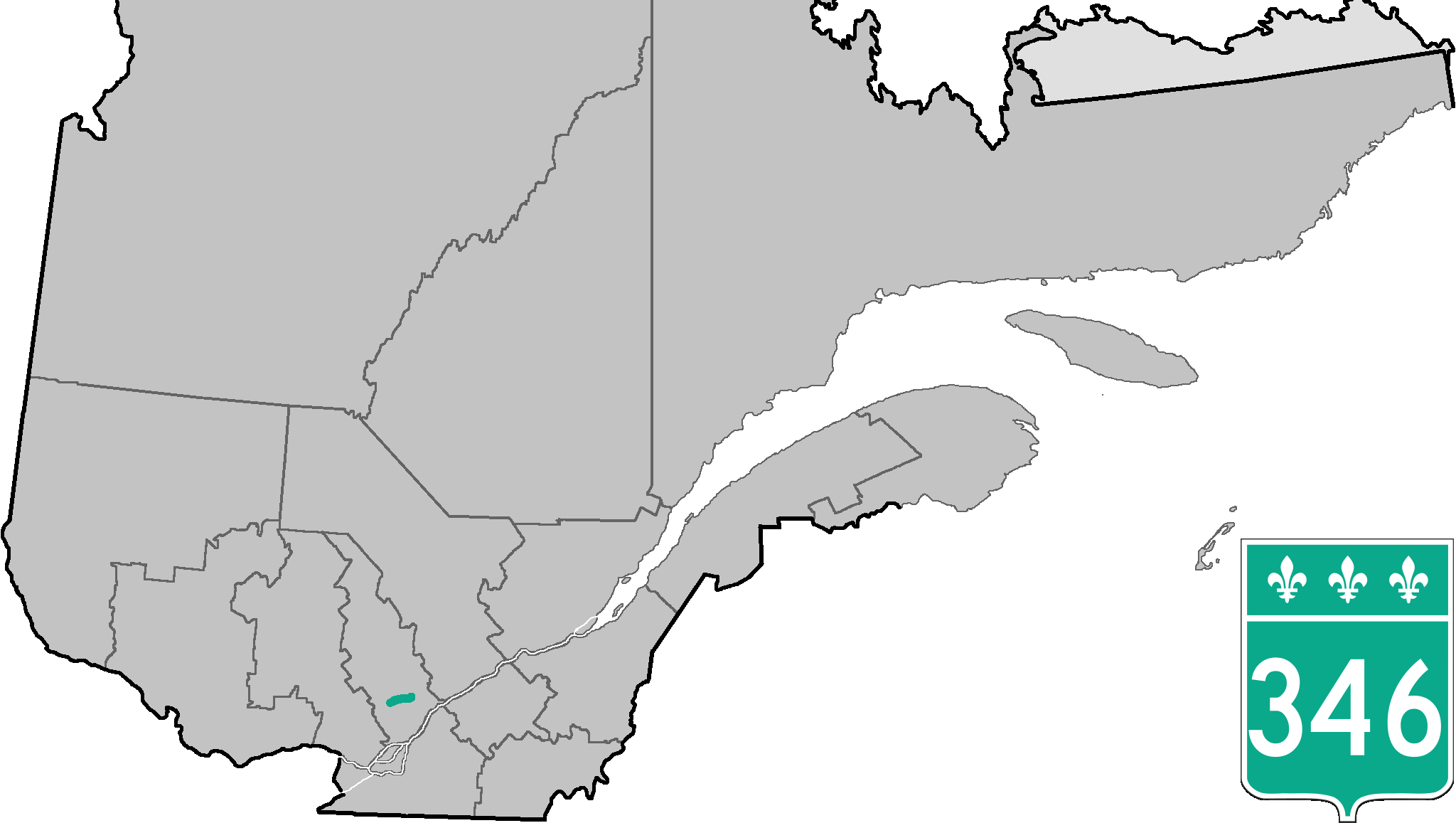

Route information
- Maintained by Transports Québec
- Length: 22.0 km (13.7 mi)

Major junctions
- East end: R-343 in Saint-Charles-Borromée
- R-341 in Saint-Liguori
- West end: R-125 / R-337 in Saint-Julienne

Location
- Country: Canada
- Province: Quebec

Highway system
- Quebec provincial highways; Autoroutes; List; Former
← R-345	→ R-347

Route 346 is a provincial highway located in the Lanaudière region of Quebec, Canada. It runs from the junctions of Route 125 and Route 337 in Sainte-Julienne and ends at Route 343 in Saint-Charles-Borromée. The route also runs concurrent with Route 341 in Saint-Liguori.

== Municipalities along Route 346 ==
- Sainte-Julienne
- Saint-Liguori
- Saint-Charles-Borromée

== See also ==
- List of Quebec provincial highways
