= Quebec Route 337 =

Highway in Quebec, Canada

Route 337

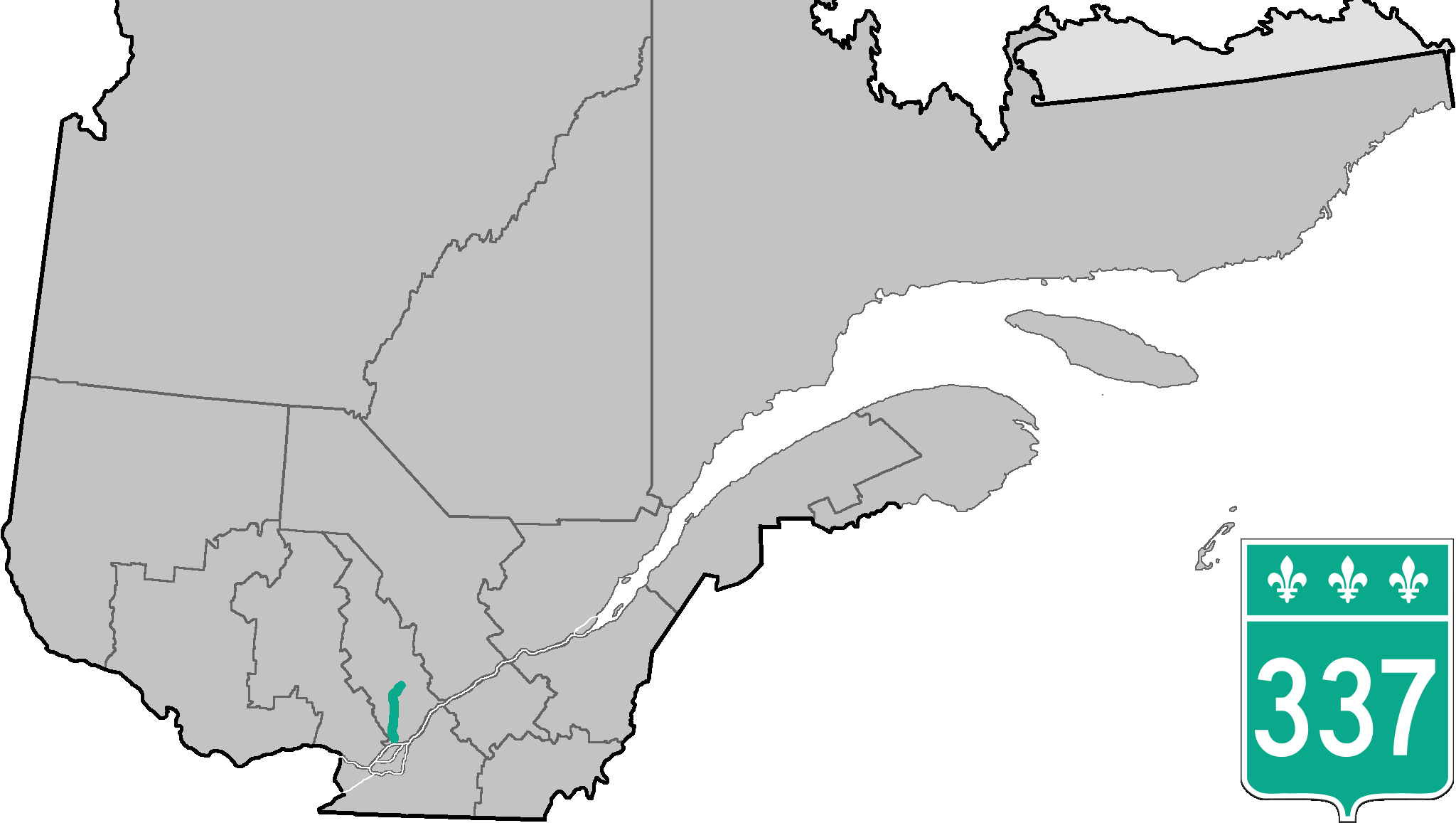

Route information
- Maintained by Transports Québec
- Length: 80.0 km (49.7 mi)

Major junctions
- South end: R-344 in Terrebonne
- A-25 in Terrebonne; A-640 in Mascouche; R-335 in La Plaine; R-158 / R-335 / R-339 in Saint-Lin-Laurentides; R-125 / R-335 / R-346 in Sainte-Julienne; R-125 / R-341 / R-348 in Rawdon; R-343 in Saint-Alphonse-Rodriguez
- North end: R-131 in Saint-Jean-de-Matha

Location
- Country: Canada
- Province: Quebec
- Major cities: Terrebonne, Mascouche, Saint-Lin-Laurentides, Saint-Jean-de-Matha

Highway system
- Quebec provincial highways; Autoroutes; List; Former
← R-335	→ R-338

Route 337 is a Quebec provincial highway situated in the Lanaudière region. It runs from the junctions of Autoroute 25 and Route 344 in Terrebonne (north of Laval and Montreal) and ends in Saint-Jean-de-Matha at Route 131. It overlaps Route 335 and Route 158 near Saint-Lin–Laurentides as well as Route 125 in Sainte-Julienne, Route 341 and Route 348 in Rawdon and Route 343 in Saint-Alphonse-Rodriguez.

== Municipalities along Route 337 ==
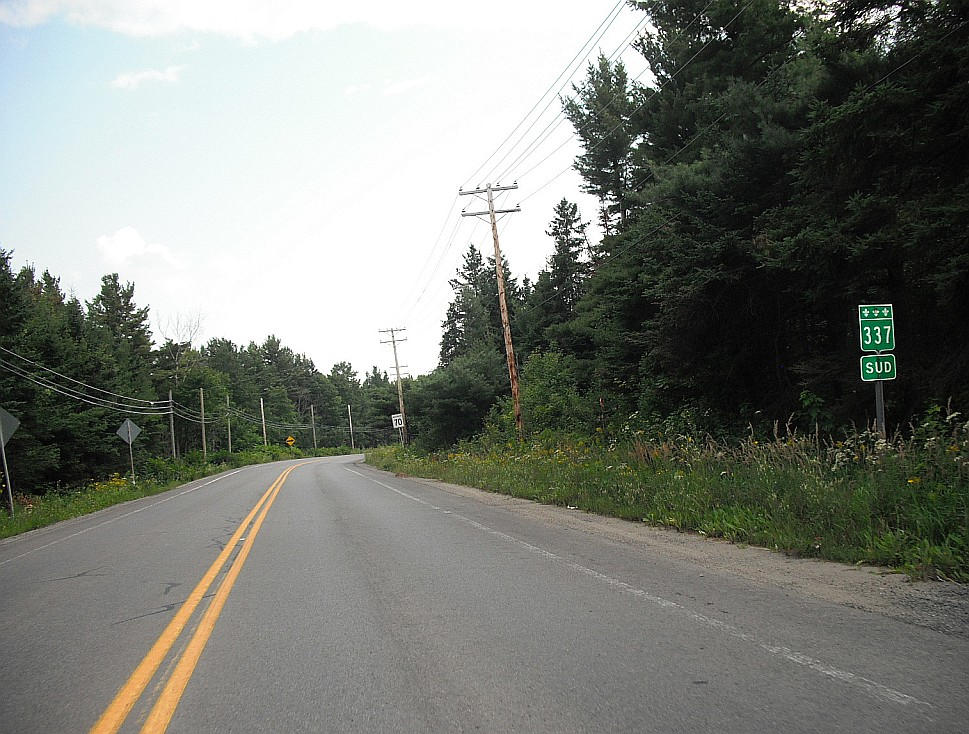
Quebec Route 337 in Sainte-Julienne

- Terrebonne - (Terrebonne / La Plaine)
- Mascouche
- Saint-Lin–Laurentides
- Sainte-Julienne
- Rawdon
- Saint-Alphonse-Rodriguez
- Sainte-Béatrix
- Saint-Jean-de-Matha

== See also ==
- List of Quebec provincial highways
