= Saint-Cléophas-de-Brandon =

- Municipality
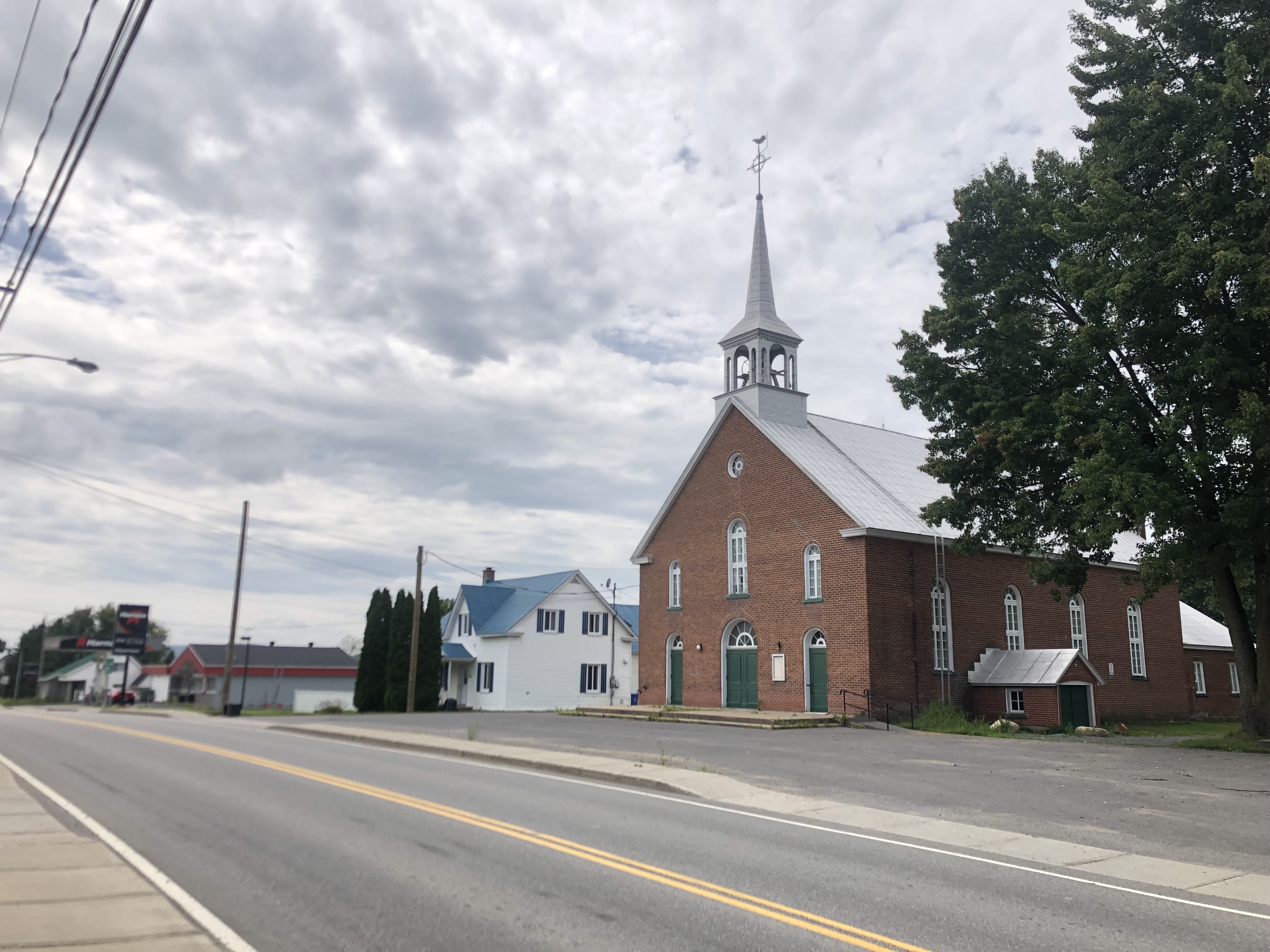

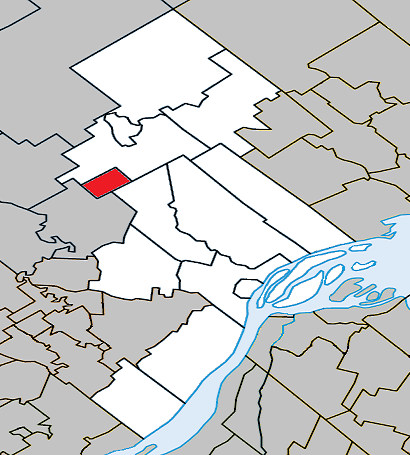
- Location within D'Autray RCM

- Location in central Quebec
- Coordinates: 46°14′N 73°25′W
- Country: Canada
- Province: Quebec
- Region: Lanaudière
- RCM: D'Autray
- Constituted: October 7, 1897

Government
  - Mayor: Audrey Sénéchal
  - Fed. riding: Berthier—Maskinongé
  - Prov. riding: Berthier

Area
  - Total: 15.31 km^{2} (5.91 sq mi)
  - Land: 15.34 km^{2} (5.92 sq mi)
- There is an apparent discrepancy between 2 authoritative sources.

Population (2021)
  - Total: 254
  - Density: 16.6/km^{2} (43/sq mi)
  - Change 2016-21: ▲11.9%
  - Dwellings: 112
- Time zone: UTC−5 (EST)
  - Summer (DST): UTC−4 (EDT)
- Postal code(s): J0K 2A0
- Area codes: 450, 579
- Highways: R-348
- Website: www.st-cleophas.qc.ca

Saint-Cléophas-de-Brandon is a municipality in D'Autray Regional County Municipality in the Lanaudière region of Quebec, Canada. Before 1997, it was known simply as Saint-Cléophas.

== History ==
In 1897, the Parish of Saint-Cléophas was formed when it separated from the parish of Saint-Félix-de-Valois. It seems that the name of Saint Cléophas was suggested by Édouard-Charles Fabre (1827-1896), archbishop of Montreal, to honour Cléophas Beausoleil (1845-1904), who was House of Commons member for Berthier from 1887 to 1899. That same year, its post office opened and a year later the Parish Municipality of Saint-Cléophas was established.

In 1997, the parish municipality changed status to municipality and changed its name to Saint-Cléophas-de-Brandon in order to distinguish it from a another municipality in the Bas-Saint-Laurent region. The "Brandon" part refers to the geographic township of Brandon within which it is located.

== Geography ==
Located between Saint-Gabriel-de-Brandon to the north and Saint-Norbert to the east, between the edge of the Laurentians and Saint-Félix-de-Valois, along the Bayonne River, Saint-Cléophas-de-Brandon is characterized by a landscape of hills and plains.

== Demographics ==
In the 2021 Census of Population conducted by Statistics Canada, Saint-Cléophas-de-Brandon had a population of 254 living in 105 of its 112 total private dwellings, a change of 11.9% from its 2016 population of 227. With a land area of 15.34 km^{2} (5.92 sq mi), it had a population density of 16.6/km^{2} (42.9/sq mi) in 2021.

Historical census populations – Saint-Cléophas-de-Brandon

Year	Pop.	±%
1901	395	—
1911	355	−10.1%
1921	307	−13.5%
1931	308	+0.3%
1941	329	+6.8%
1951	309	−6.1%
1956	341	+10.4%

Year	Pop.	±%
1961	304	−10.9%
1966	297	−2.3%
1971	308	+3.7%
1976	275	−10.7%
1981	249	−9.5%
1986	259	+4.0%
1991	262	+1.2%

Year	Pop.	±%
1996	283	+8.0%
2001	285	+0.7%
2006	284	−0.4%
2011	276	−2.8%
2016	227	−17.8%
2021	254	+11.9%

Source: Statistics Canada

Mother tongue (2021):

- English as first language: 0%
- French as first language: 100%
- English and French as first languages: 0%
- Other as first language: 0%

== Education ==
The Sir Wilfrid Laurier School Board operates anglophone public schools, including:

- Joliette Elementary School in Saint-Charles-Borromée
- Joliette High School in Joliette

== See also ==
- List of municipalities in Quebec
