= Quebec Route 347 =

Highway in Quebec, Canada

Route 347

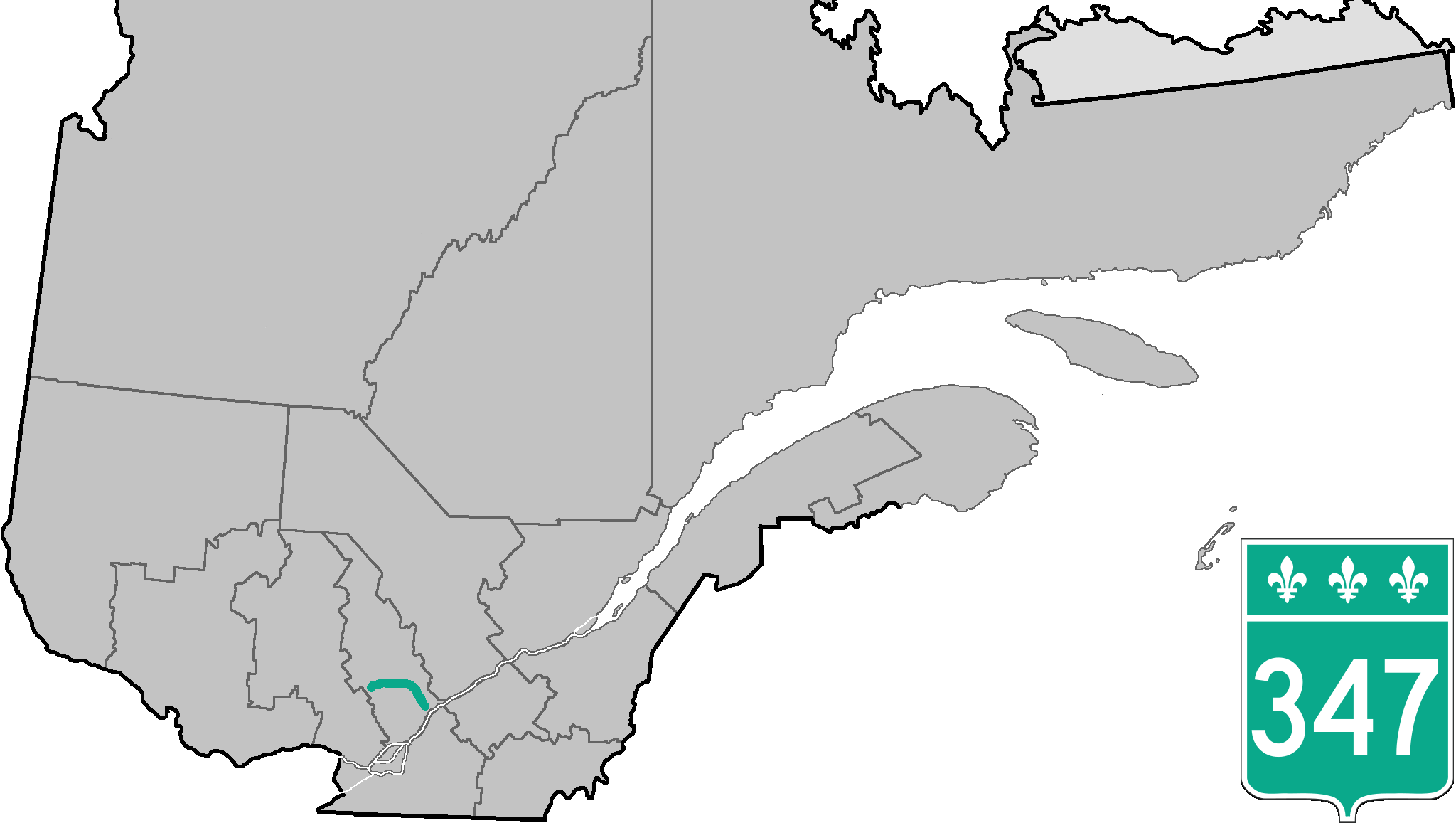

Route information
- Maintained by Transports Québec
- Length: 97.3 km (60.5 mi)

Major junctions
- South end: R-158 in Sainte-Geneviève-de-Berthier
- R-348 in Saint-Gabriel; R-131 in Saint-Emilie-de-l'Energie; R-343 in Saint-Côme
- North end: R-125 in Notre-Dame-de-la-Merci

Location
- Country: Canada
- Province: Quebec
- Major cities: Saint-Gabriel-de-Brandon, Saint-Jean-de-Matha

Highway system
- Quebec provincial highways; Autoroutes; List; Former
← R-346	→ R-348

Route 347 is a provincial highway located in the Lanaudière region of Quebec. The 97-kilometer highway runs from Sainte-Geneviève-de-Berthier at the junction of Route 158 north of Autoroute 40 and ends in Notre-Dame-de-la-Merci at the junction of Route 125. In Saint-Gabriel-de-Brandon, it overlaps Route 348 while between north of Saint-Jean-de-Matha and Saint-Émélie-de-L'Énergie it overlaps Route 131.

== Municipalities along Route 347 ==
- Sainte-Geneviève-de-Berthier
- Saint-Norbert
- Saint-Gabriel-de-Brandon
- Saint-Gabriel
- Saint-Damien
- Saint-Émélie-de-L'Énergie
- Saint-Côme
- Notre-Dame-de-la-Merci

== See also ==
- List of Quebec provincial highways
