= Quebec Route 348 =

Highway in Quebec, Canada

Route 348

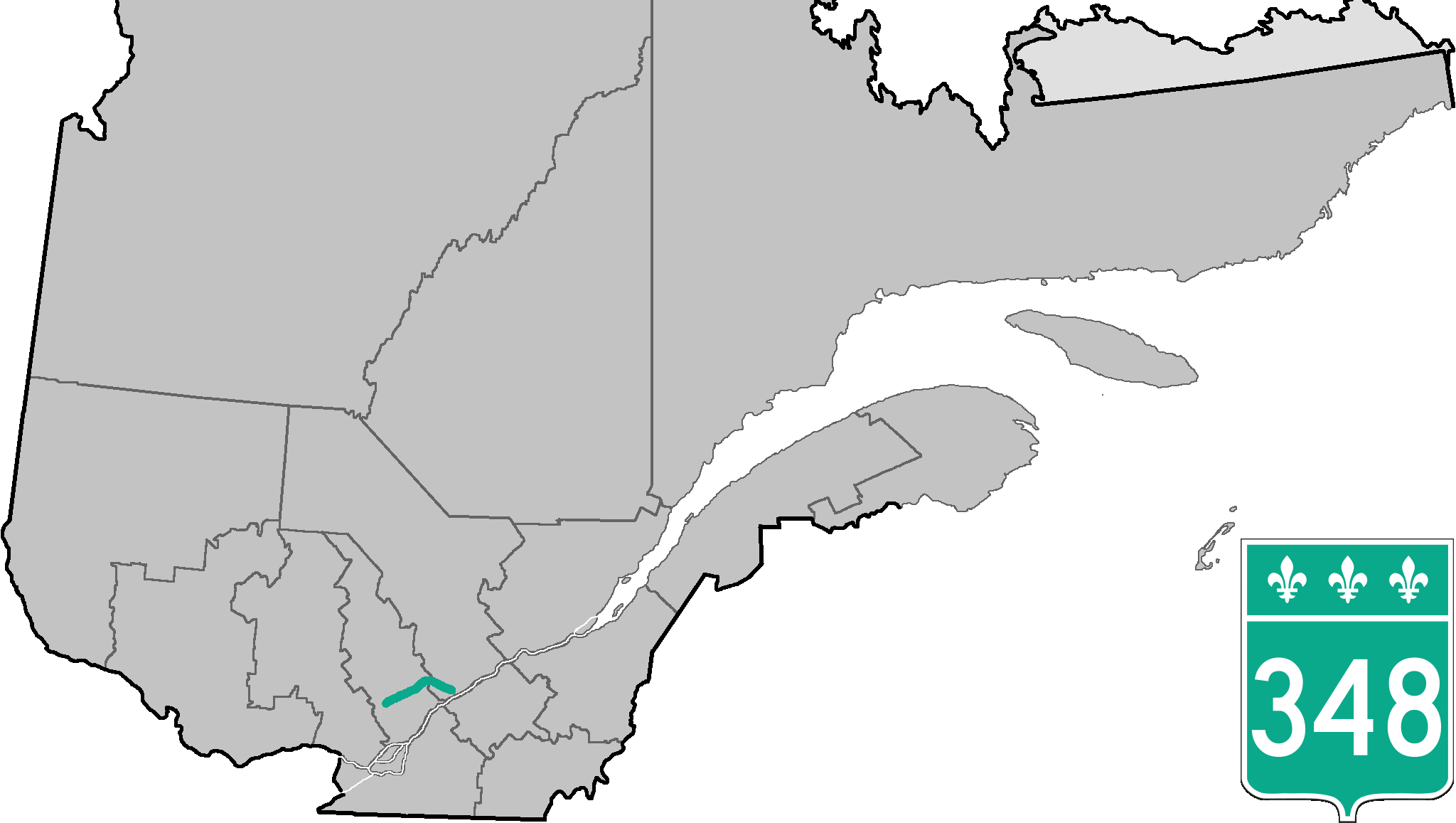

Route information
- Maintained by Transports Québec
- Length: 91.5 km (56.9 mi)

Major junctions
- West end: R-125 in Rawdon
- R-131 near Saint-Felix-de-Valois
- East end: R-138 in Louiseville

Location
- Country: Canada
- Province: Quebec
- Major cities: Rawdon, Saint-Gabriel-de-Brandon, Louiseville

Highway system
- Quebec provincial highways; Autoroutes; List; Former
← R-347	→ R-349

Route 348 is a provincial highway located in the Lanaudière and Mauricie regions of Quebec. It runs from the junction of Route 125 just west of Rawdon and ends at Route 138 in Louiseville. It overlaps Route 337 and Route 341 in Rawdon, Route 131 northwest of Saint-Félix-de-Valois, and Route 347 in Saint-Gabriel-de-Brandon.

== Towns along Route 348 ==
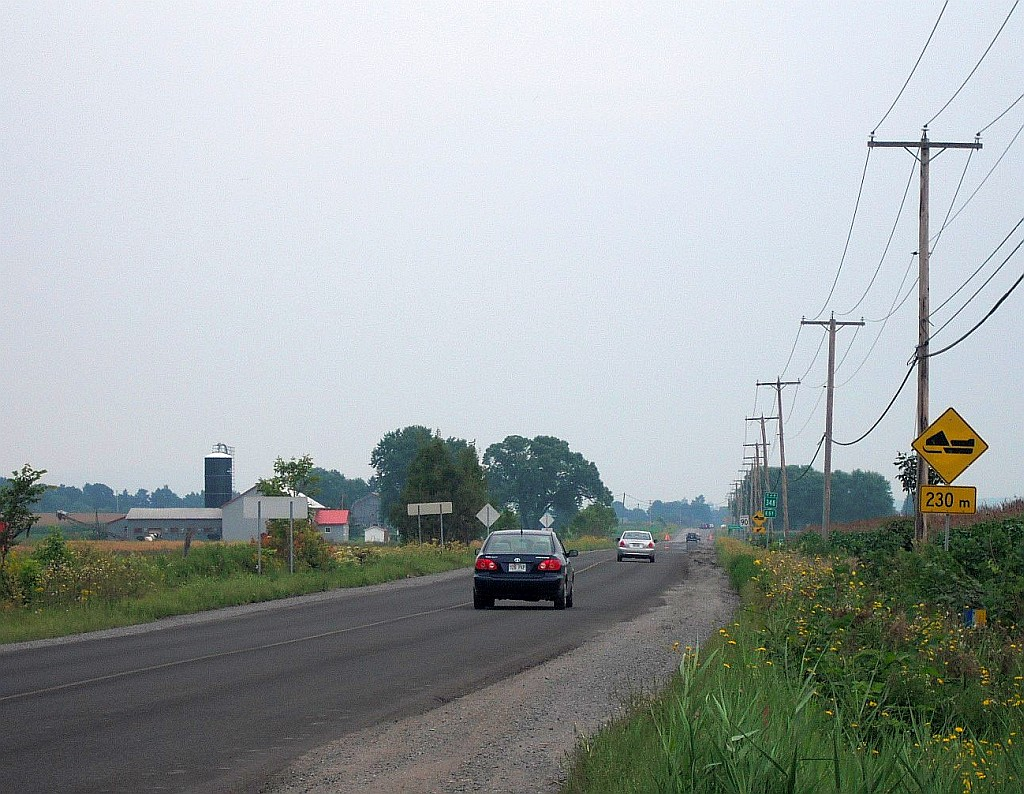
Quebec Route 348 in Rawdon

- Rawdon
- Saint-Ambroise-de-Kildare
- Sainte-Mélanie
- Saint-Félix-de-Valois
- Saint-Cléophas-de-Brandon
- Saint-Gabriel-de-Brandon
- Saint-Gabriel
- Saint-Didace
- Saint-Édouard-de-Maskinongé
- Sainte-Ursule
- Louiseville

== Major intersections ==
RCM or ET	Municipality	Km	Road	Notes
Matawinie	Rawdon	0.0	R-125	
Matawinie	Rawdon	5.7	R-341	Western terminus of Route 341 / Route 348 overlap
Matawinie	Rawdon	6.9	R-337	Western terminus of Route 337 / Route 341 / Route 348 overlap
Matawinie	Rawdon	7.2	R-337	Eastern terminus of Route 337 / Route 341 / Route 348 overlap
Matawinie	Rawdon	8.3	R-341	Eastern terminus of Route 341 / Route 348 overlap
Joliette	Saint-Ambroise-de-Kildare	19.3	R-343	
Joliette	Saint-Ambroise-de-Kildare	~21	Route de Sainte-Béatrix (north)	To Sainte-Béatrix
Joliette	Saint-Ambroise-de-Kildare	~22	Route de Sainte-Béatrix (south)	To Saint-Charles-Borromée
Joliette	Sainte-Mélanie	26.6	Chemin du Lac Sud	To Notre-Dame-de-Lourdes
Matawinie	Saint-Félix-de-Valois	32.6	R-131	Western terminus of Route 131 / Route 348 overlap
Matawinie	Saint-Félix-de-Valois	33.5	R-131	Eastern terminus of Route 131 / Route 348 overlap
Matawinie	Saint-Félix-de-Valois	~38	Chemin de Saint-Gabriel	To Saint-Félix-de-Valois
D'Autray	Saint-Gabriel-de-Brandon	50.0	R-347	Western terminus of Route 347 / Route 348 overlap
D'Autray	Saint-Gabriel	51.0	R-347	Eastern terminus of Route 347 / Route 348 overlap
D'Autray	Saint-Gabriel-de-Brandon	55.0	Rang Saint-Augustin	To Mandeville
D'Autray	Saint-Didace	61.3	R-349	Northern terminus of Route 349
Maskinongé	Saint-Édouard-de-Maskinongé	75.6	R-350	Western terminus of Route 350
Maskinongé	Saint-Ursule	84.4	Route Gérin	To Saint-Ursule and Saint-Justin
Maskinongé	Louiseville	91.5	R-138	

== See also ==
- List of Quebec provincial highways
