= Quebec Route 341 =

Highway in Quebec, Canada

Route 341

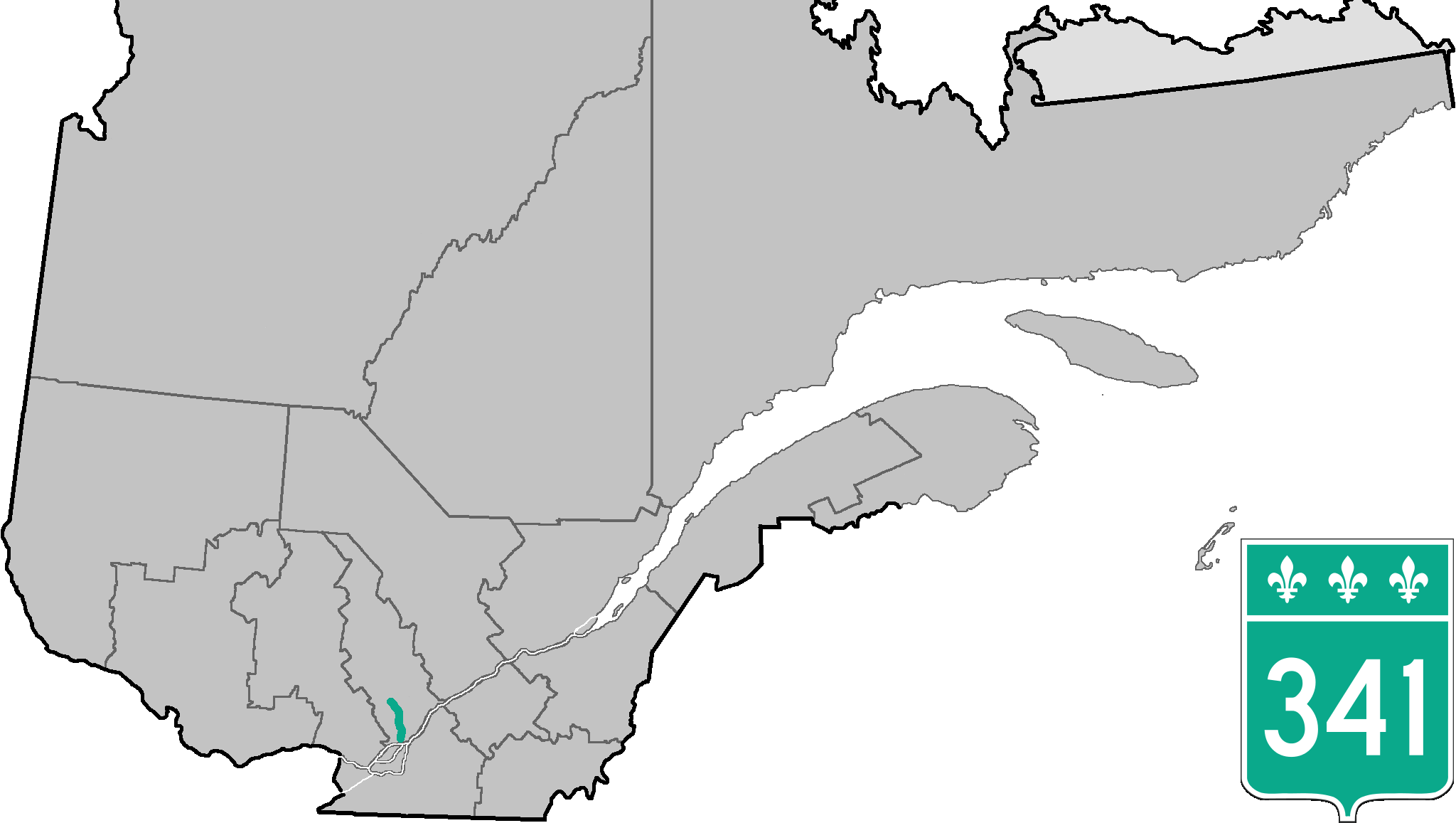

Route information
- Maintained by Transports Québec
- Length: 55.8 km (34.7 mi)

Major junctions
- South end: Boulevard Iberville in Repentigny
- A-40 in Repentigny; R-344 in L'Assomption; R-339 in L'Épiphanie; R-158 in Saint-Jacques; R-346 in Sainte-Julienne; R-337 / R-348 in Rawdon
- North end: R-125 in Chertsey

Location
- Country: Canada
- Province: Quebec
- Major cities: Repentigny, Rawdon

Highway system
- Quebec provincial highways; Autoroutes; List; Former
| ← R-340 | → R-342 |

Route 341 is a Quebec provincial highway located in the Lanaudière region northeast of Montreal. It runs from south to north from Repentigny just south of the junction of Autoroute 40 and ends 55 kilometers north at the junction of Route 125 northwest of Rawdon, Quebec. It overlaps Route 337 and Route 348 in Rawdon and Route 346 east of Sainte-Julienne.

== Municipalities along Route 341 ==
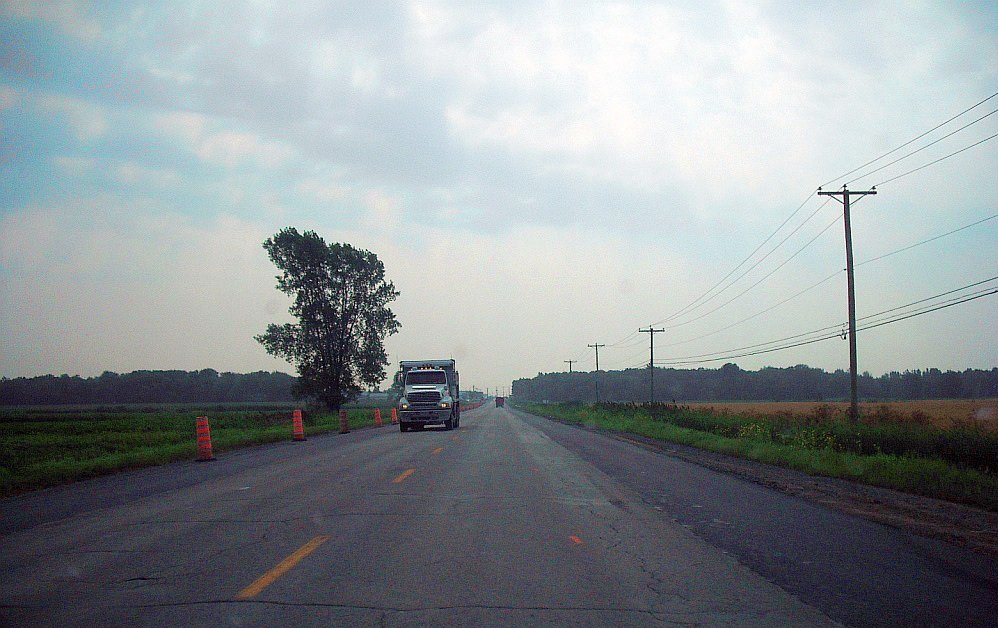
Quebec Route 341 in L'Épiphanie

- Repentigny
- L'Assomption
- L'Épiphanie
- Saint-Jacques
- Sainte-Julienne
- Rawson
- Chertsey

== See also ==
- List of Quebec provincial highways
