= Saint-Ambroise-de-Kildare =

- Municipality
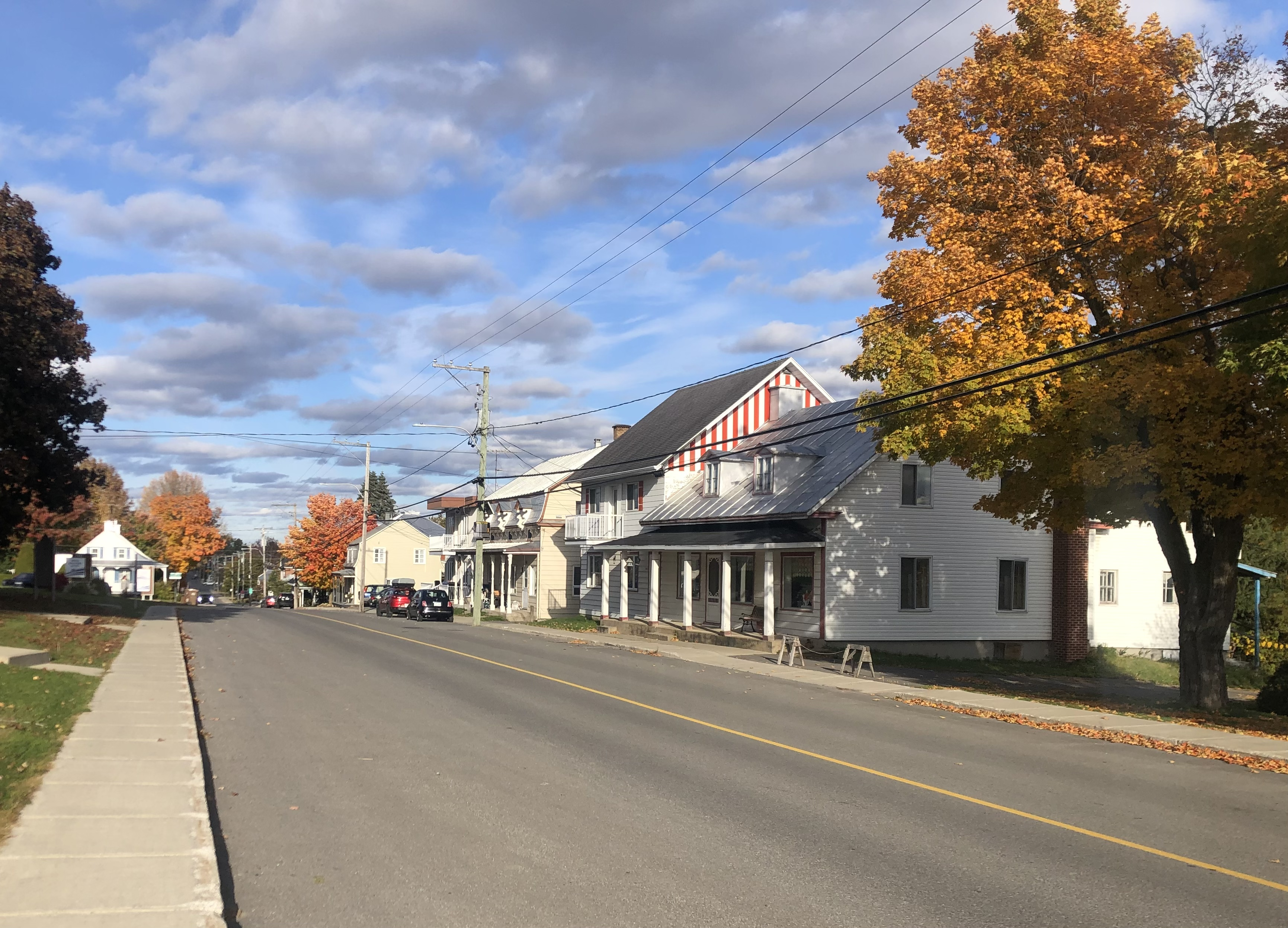

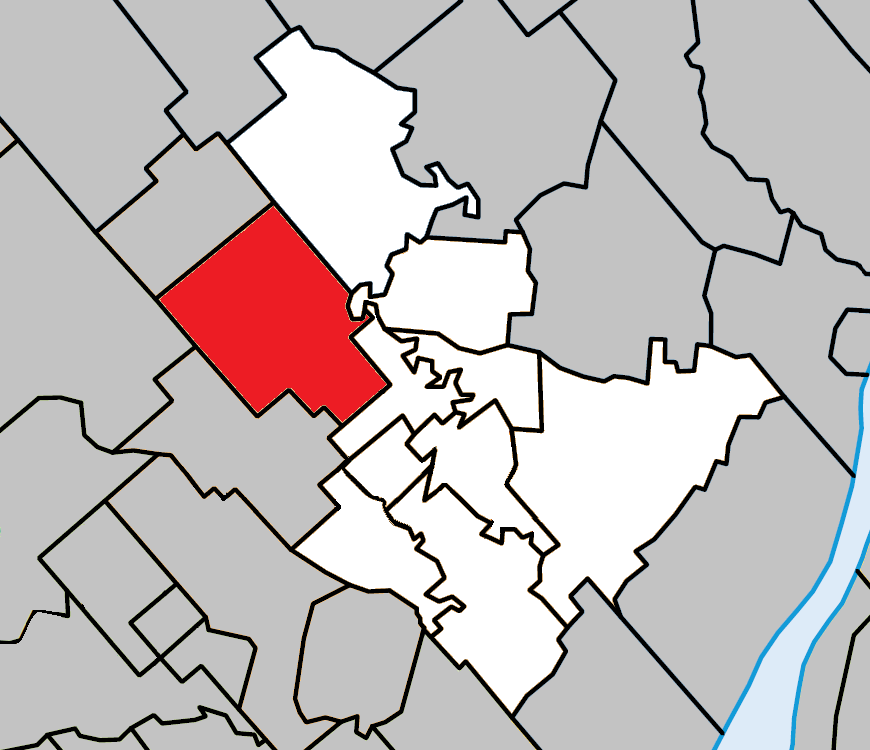
- Location within Joliette RCM

- Location in central Quebec
- Coordinates: 46°05′N 73°33′W
- Country: Canada
- Province: Quebec
- Region: Lanaudière
- RCM: Joliette
- Settled: 1830s
- Constituted: July 1, 1855

Government
  - Mayor: Eliane Neveu
  - Federal riding: Joliette
  - Prov. riding: Joliette

Area
  - Total: 67.82 km^{2} (26.19 sq mi)
  - Land: 67.73 km^{2} (26.15 sq mi)

Population (2021)
  - Total: 4,090
  - Density: 60.4/km^{2} (156/sq mi)
  - Pop (2016-21): ▲6.1%
  - Dwellings: 1,749
- Time zone: UTC−5 (EST)
  - Summer (DST): UTC−4 (EDT)
- Postal code(s): J0K 1C0
- Area codes: 450, 579
- Highways: R-343 R-346; R-348
- Website: www.saintambroise.ca

Saint-Ambroise-de-Kildare is a municipality in the Lanaudière region of Quebec, Canada, part of the Joliette Regional County Municipality.

== History ==
In 1803, the geographic township of Kildare was proclaimed, named after Kildare, Ireland. At the time, the land was granted as title deeds or as payment for professional services. For example, the Lord of Lavaltrie entrusted the central portion to Mr. Vondevelden to pay for his surveying fees. As for the northern portion, Major Beauchamp Colclough, Crown Commissioner and Land Agent, granted land to English soldiers in 1822. He intended to establish the Town of Kildare, but his dismissal delayed the development of the place.

The first inhabitants came from Saint-Paul, Saint-Elizabeth, Lanoraie, and Berthier. Among the early settlers were also many Irish families, who cleared much land, built an English school, built a chapel, and a Protestant cemetery.

In 1832, the Parish of Saint-Jacques-de-Kildare was founded, which was renamed a year later to Saint-Philippe-de-Kildare. It was renamed again to its present name in 1839 since the Anglican, Methodist, and Catholic pioneers all had a devotion to St. Ambrose of Milan.

In 1847, the municipality was first incorporated but was soon abolished. In 1855, the Parish Municipality of Saint-Ambroise-de-Kildare was formed, with Charles Laporte as first mayor and D. Maigret as first treasury-secretary.

In 1956, the parish municipality lost part of its territory when the Municipality of Sainte-Marcelline-de-Kildare was formed.

On December 6, 2014, Saint-Ambroise-de-Kildare changed from parish municipality to a (regular) municipality.

== Demographics ==
=== Population ===
Canada census – Saint-Ambroise-de-Kildare community profile

	2021	2016	2011
Population	4,090 (+6.1% from 2016)	3,856 (+2.9% from 2011)	3,747 (+7.3% from 2006)
Land area	67.73 km^{2} (26.15 sq mi)	67.72 km^{2} (26.15 sq mi)	67.72 km^{2} (26.15 sq mi)
Population density	60.4/km^{2} (156/sq mi)	56.9/km^{2} (147/sq mi)	55.3/km^{2} (143/sq mi)
Median age	42.8 (M: 42.0, F: 43.6)	42.5 (M: 42.2, F: 42.9)	42.1 (M: 41.5, F: 42.5)
Private dwellings	1,749 (total) 1,694 (occupied)	1,631 (total)	1,530 (total)
Median household income	$78,000	$64,307	$55,549

References: 2021 2016 2011

Historical Census Data - Saint-Ambroise-de-Kildare, Quebec

Year	Pop.	±%
1921	1,459	—
1931	1,584	+8.6%
1941	1,602	+1.1%
1951	1,683	+5.1%
1956	1,419	−15.7%
1961	1,422	+0.2%

Year	Pop.	±%
1966	1,602	+12.7%
1971	1,798	+12.2%
1976	2,044	+13.7%
1981	2,502	+22.4%
1986	2,731	+9.2%
1991	3,136	+14.8%

Year	Pop.	±%
1996	3,406	+8.6%
2001	3,383	−0.7%
2006	3,491	+3.2%
2011	3,747	+7.3%
2016	3,856	+2.9%
2021	4,090	+6.1%

Population counts are not adjusted for boundary changes.
Source: Statistics Canada

=== Language ===
Mother tongue (2021):

- English as first language: 0.7%
- French as first language: 98.1%
- English and French as first language: 0.5%
- Other as first language: 0.7%

== Economy ==
Average income per family is $56,807. 88.20% of residents are home owners, whereas 11.8% of residents are renters. The major sectors of employment are: agriculture, sales/service/retail commerce, transportation, health care, and financial institutions.

== Culture ==
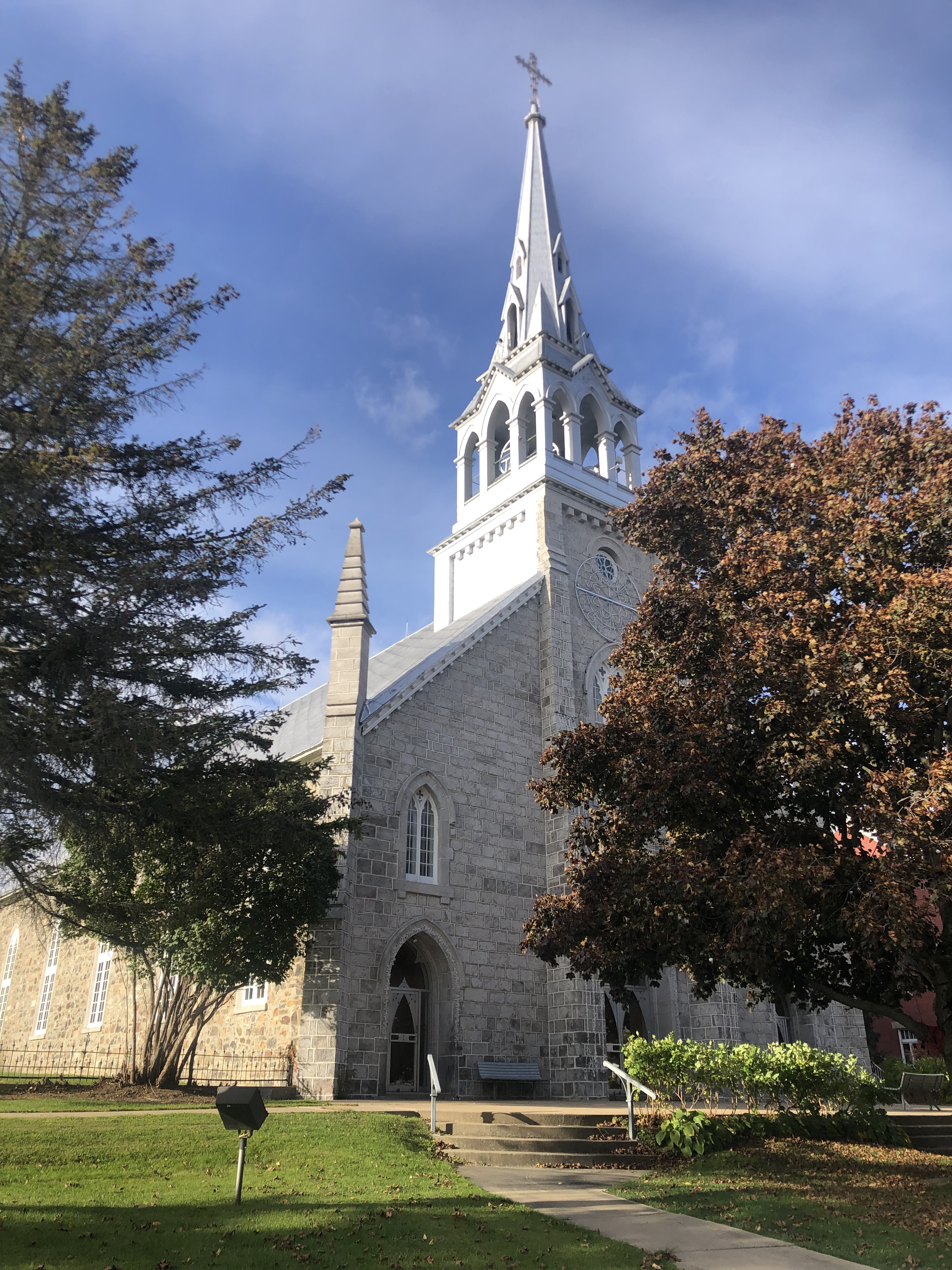

The French-Canadian soap opera TV series Terre Humaine was filmed in the municipality and set in the parish of Sainte-Marie des Anges, a fictional recreation of Saint-Ambroise-de-Kildare.

== Education ==
The Commission scolaire des Samares operates francophone public schools, including:

- École Notre-Dame-de-la-Paix

The Sir Wilfrid Laurier School Board operates anglophone public schools, including:

- Joliette Elementary School in Saint-Charles-Borromée
- Joliette High School in Joliette

== Sports ==
Saint-Ambroise-de-Kildare doesn't have any notable sporting facility. Most activity are therefore practiced in nearby Saint-Charles-Borromée.

== Notable people ==
- Aimé Pelletier (1914-2010), Montreal-based surgeon, who developed a parallel career as a well-known Quebec novelist, under the pen name of Bertrand Vac.

== See also ==
- List of municipalities in Quebec
