= Saint-Alphonse-Rodriguez =

- Municipality
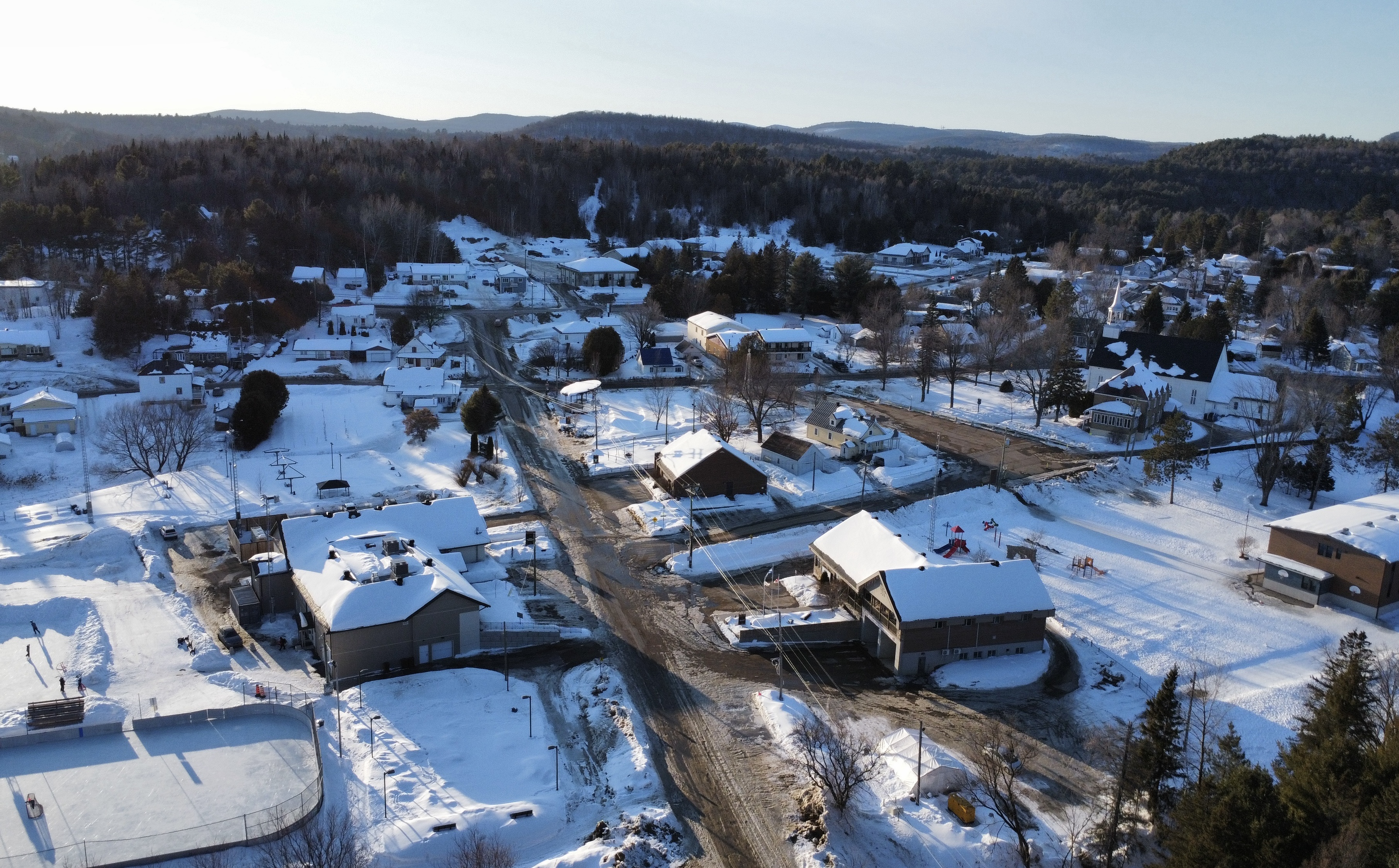

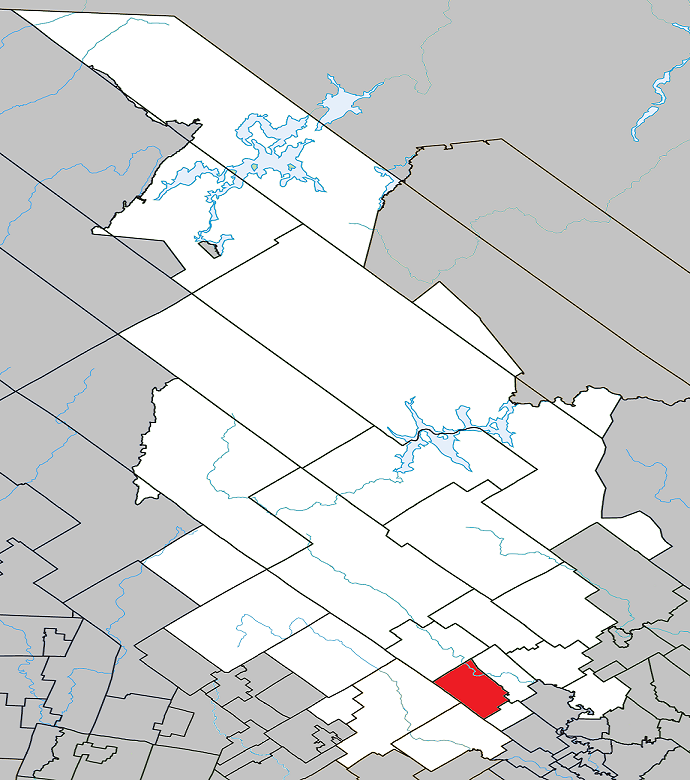
- Location within Matawinie RCM

- Location in central Quebec.
- Coordinates: 46°11′N 73°42′W
- Country: Canada
- Province: Quebec
- Region: Lanaudière
- RCM: Matawinie
- Constituted: July 1, 1855

Government
  - Mayor: Charles-André Pagé
  - Federal riding: Joliette—Manawan
  - Prov. riding: Berthier

Area
  - Total: 104.60 km^{2} (40.39 sq mi)
  - Land: 97.79 km^{2} (37.76 sq mi)

Population (2021)
  - Total: 3,339
  - Density: 34.2/km^{2} (89/sq mi)
  - Pop 2006-2021: ▲5.9%
  - Dwellings: 2,363
- Time zone: UTC−5 (EST)
  - Summer (DST): UTC−4 (EDT)
- Postal code(s): J0K 1W0
- Area codes: 450 and 579
- Highways: R-337; R-343
- Website: www.munsar.ca

Saint-Alphonse-Rodriguez (French pronunciation: [sɛ̃t‿alfɔ̃s ʁɔdʁiɡɛs, -ɡɛz]) is a municipality in the Lanaudière region of Quebec, Canada, part of the Matawinie Regional County Municipality.

== Demographics ==
=== Population ===
Historical Census Data - Saint-Alphonse-Rodriguez, Quebec

Year	Pop.	±%
1991	2,149	—
1996	2,461	+14.5%
2001	2,691	+9.3%

Year	Pop.	±%
2006	3,152	+17.1%
2011	3,134	−0.6%
2016	3,162	+0.9%

Year	Pop.	±%
2021	3,339	+5.6%

Private dwellings occupied by usual residents: 1529 (total dwellings: 2363)

=== Language ===
Mother tongue:

- English as first language: 1.9%
- French as first language: 95.7%
- English and French as first language: 1.1%
- Other as first language: 1.3%

== Education ==
Commission scolaire des Samares operates Francophone public schools:

- École de Saint-Alphonse

Sir Wilfrid Laurier School Board operates Anglophone public schools:

- Rawdon Elementary School in Rawdon
- Joliette High School in Joliette

== See also ==
- List of municipalities in Quebec
