= Saint-Norbert =

Parish municipality in Lanaudière region of Quebec, Canada

- Parish municipality
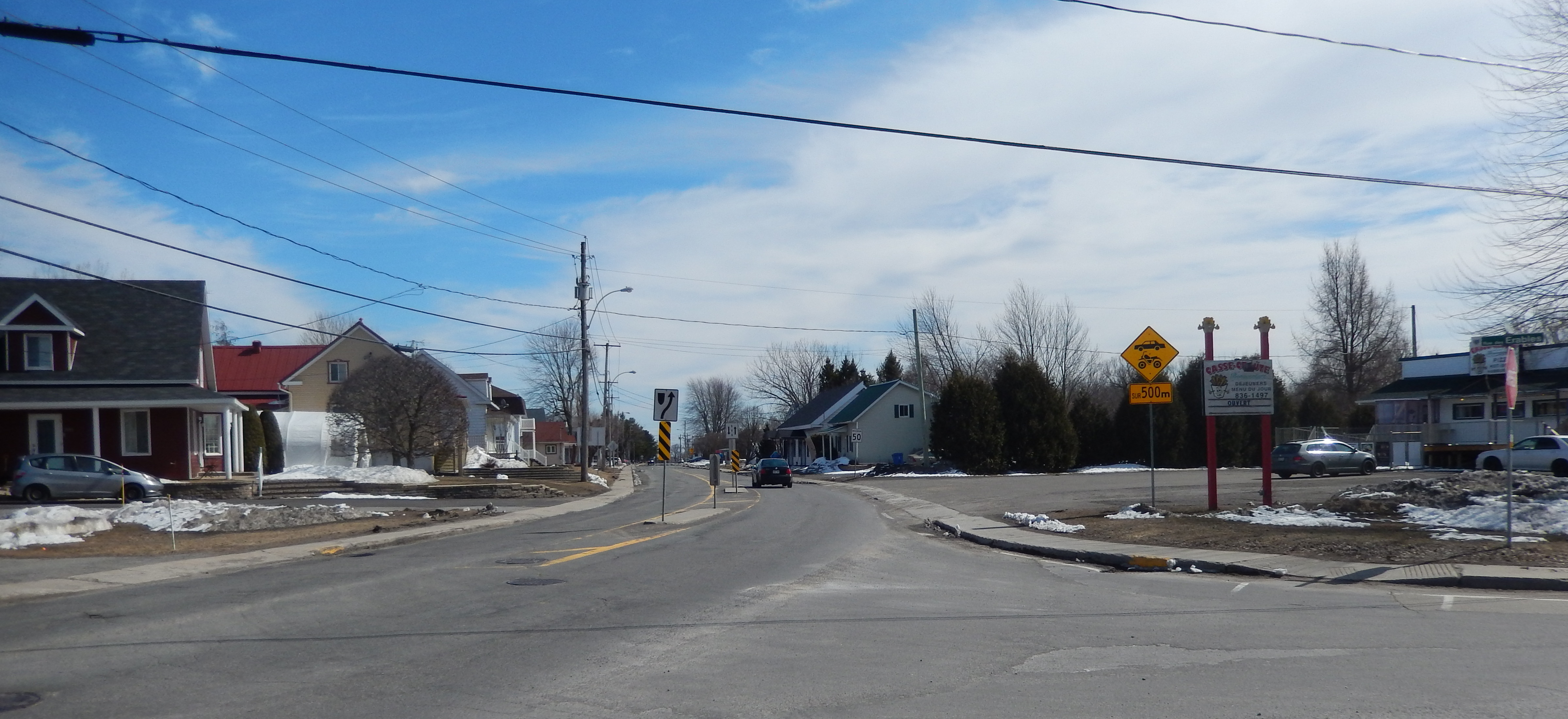

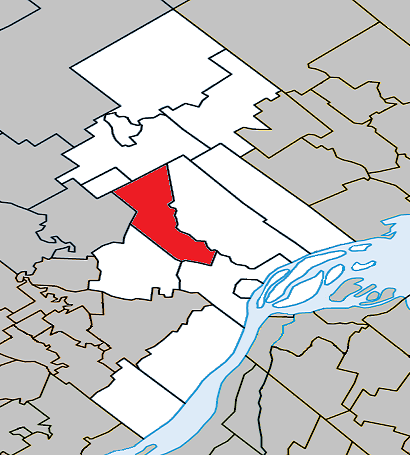
- Location within D'Autray RCM

- Location in central Quebec
- Coordinates: 46°10′N 73°19′W
- Country: Canada
- Province: Quebec
- Region: Lanaudière
- RCM: D'Autray
- Constituted: July 1, 1855
- Named for: Norbert of Xanten

Government
  - Mayor: Sonia Desjardins
  - Fed. riding: Berthier—Maskinongé
  - Prov. riding: Berthier

Area
  - Total: 74.63 km^{2} (28.81 sq mi)
  - Land: 74.60 km^{2} (28.80 sq mi)

Population (2021)
  - Total: 1,060
  - Density: 14.2/km^{2} (37/sq mi)
  - Change 2016-21: ▲5.7%
  - Dwellings: 487
- Time zone: UTC−5 (EST)
  - Summer (DST): UTC−4 (EDT)
- Postal code(s): J0K 3C0
- Area codes: 450 and 579
- Highways: R-347
- Website: www.saint-norbert.net

Saint-Norbert (French pronunciation: [sɛ̃ nɔʁbɛʁ]) is a parish municipality in D'Autray Regional County Municipality the Lanaudière region of Quebec, Canada. Saint-Norbert is located between Sainte-Geneviève-de-Berthier and Saint-Gabriel-de-Brandon, north of Montreal along Lac Saint-Pierre and the St. Lawrence River.

== History ==
The municipality is named after Saint Norbert of Xanten. The parish of Saint-Norbert was detached from that of Sainte-Genevieve-de-Berthier in 1848. The church in the centre of the village was inaugurated in 1876.

== Demographics ==
In the 2021 Census of Population conducted by Statistics Canada, Saint-Norbert had a population of 1,060 living in 459 of its 487 total private dwellings, an increase of 5.7% from its 2016 population of 1,003. With a land area of 74.6 km^{2} (28.8 sq mi), it had a population density of 14.2/km^{2} (36.8/sq mi) in 2021.

Historical census populations – Saint-Norbert

Year	Pop.	±%
1861	1,500	—
1871	1,943	+29.5%
1881	1,451	−25.3%
1891	1,478	+1.9%
1901	1,292	−12.6%
1911	1,210	−6.3%
1921	1,048	−13.4%
1931	988	−5.7%

Year	Pop.	±%
1941	977	−1.1%
1951	970	−0.7%
1956	1,031	+6.3%
1961	1,023	−0.8%
1966	1,022	−0.1%
1971	998	−2.3%
1976	946	−5.2%
1981	957	+1.2%

Year	Pop.	±%
1986	947	−1.0%
1991	971	+2.5%
1996	1,070	+10.2%
2001	1,046	−2.2%
2006	1,067	+2.0%
2011	1,059	−0.7%
2016	1,003	−5.3%
2021	1,060	+5.7%

Source: Statistics Canada

Mother tongue (2021):

- English as first language: 0.5%
- French as first language: 97.6%
- English and French as first languages: 0.5%
- Other as first language: 0.9%

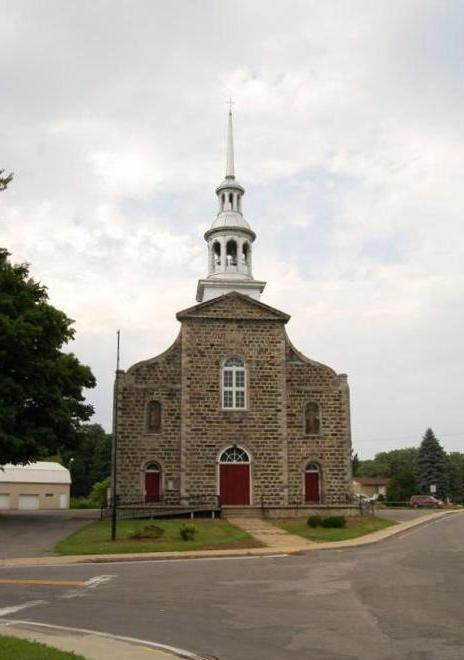
Saint-Norbert's church

== Education ==
Commission scolaire des Samares operates francophone public schools, including:

- École Sainte-Anne

The Sir Wilfrid Laurier School Board operates anglophone public schools, including:

- Joliette Elementary School in Saint-Charles-Borromée
- Joliette High School in Joliette

== See also ==
- List of parish municipalities in Quebec
