= Quebec Route 343 =

Highway in Quebec, Canada

Route 343

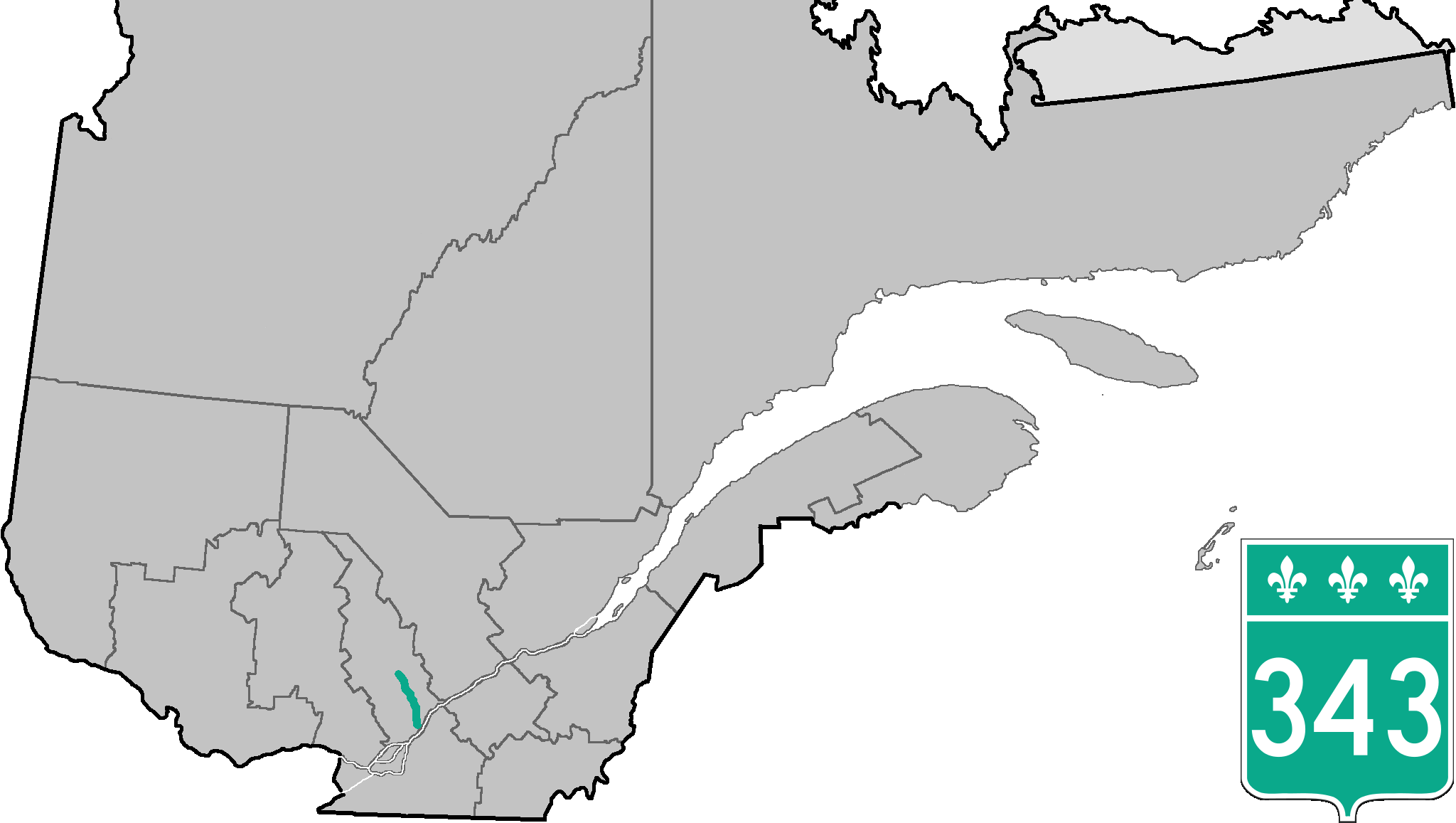

Route information
- Maintained by Transports Québec
- Length: 74.4 km (46.2 mi)

Major junctions
- North end: R-347 in Saint-Côme
- R-158 in Joliette; A-40 in L'Assomption
- South end: R-138 in Saint-Sulpice

Location
- Country: Canada
- Province: Quebec
- Major cities: L'Assomption, Joliette

Highway system
- Quebec provincial highways; Autoroutes; List; Former
← R-342	→ R-344

Route 343 is a provincial highway located in the Lanaudière region of Quebec. It runs from Route 138 west of Saint-Sulpice and south of Autoroute 40 and ends at the junction of Route 347 east of Saint-Come and north of Saint-Alphonse-Rodriguez where it has a concurrency with Route 337.

== Municipalities along Route 343 ==
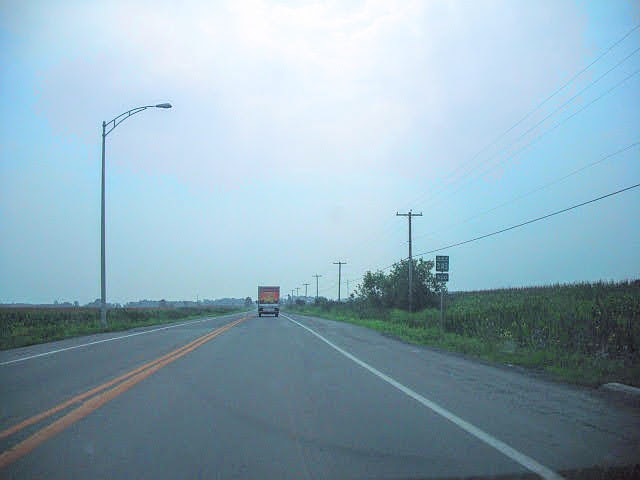
Quebec Route 343 in L'Assomption

- L'Assomption
- Saint-Paul
- Joliette
- Saint-Charles-Borromée
- Saint-Ambroise-de-Kildare
- Saint-Alphonse-Rodriguez

== See also ==
- List of Quebec provincial highways
