= Saint-Gabriel, Quebec =

Saint-Gabriel
- City
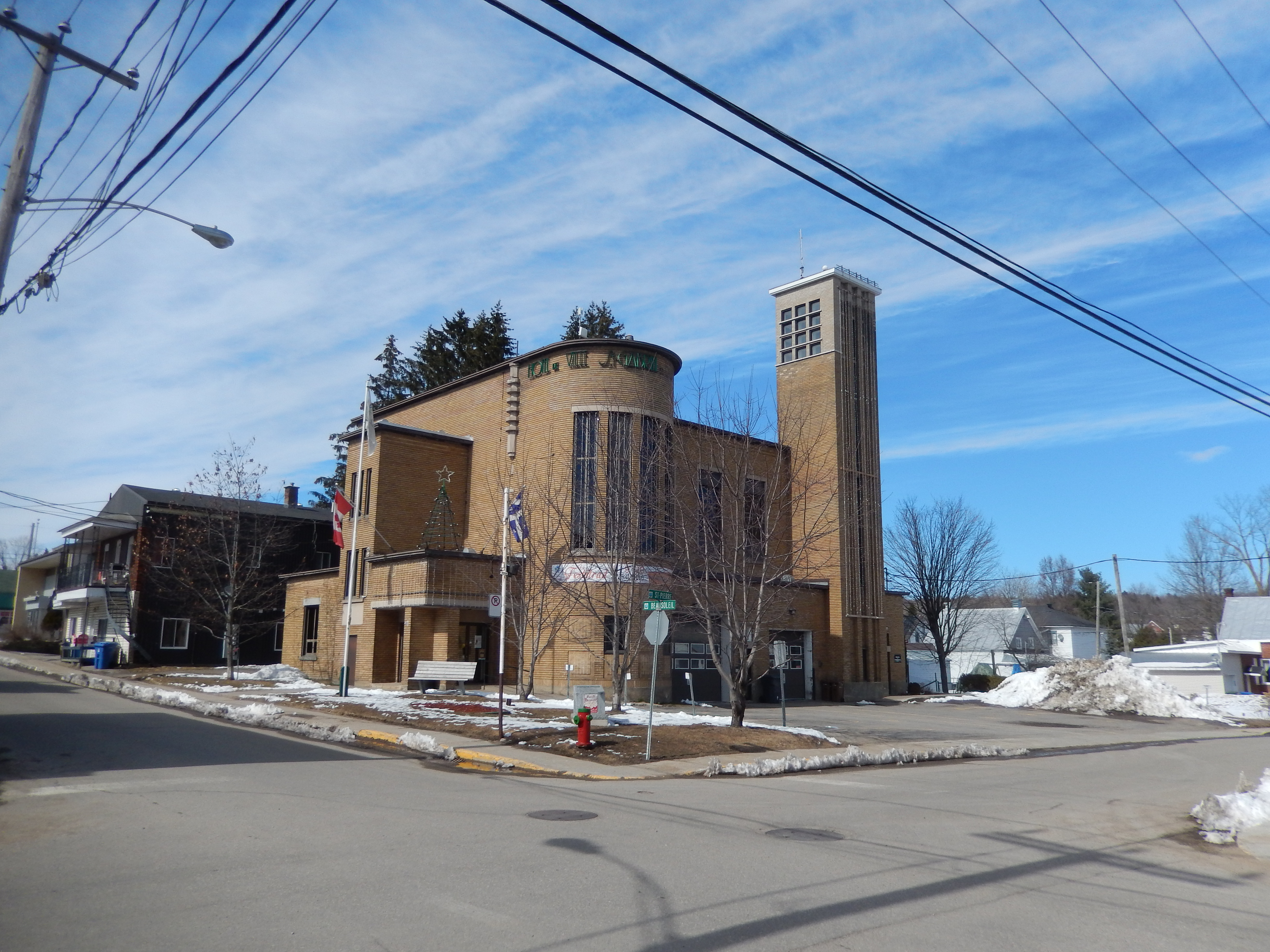
- Town hall of Saint-Gabriel

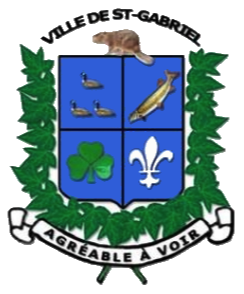
- Coat of arms
- Motto: Mirabile visu ("Nice to look at")
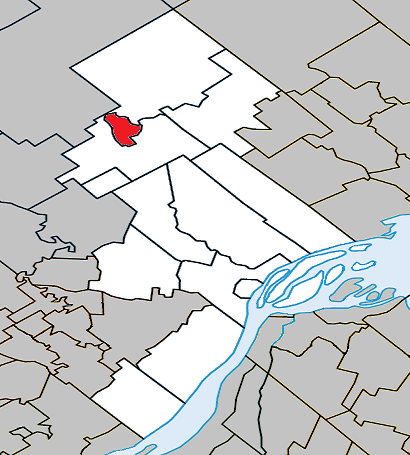
- Location within D'Autray RCM

- Location in central Quebec
- Coordinates: 46°18′N 73°23′W
- Country: Canada
- Province: Quebec
- Region: Lanaudière
- RCM: D'Autray
- Settled: 1825
- Constituted: December 17, 1892

Government
  - Mayor: Gaétan Gravel
  - Fed. riding: Berthier—Maskinongé
  - Prov. riding: Berthier

Area
  - Total: 12.77 km^{2} (4.93 sq mi)
  - Land: 2.81 km^{2} (1.08 sq mi)

Population (2021)
  - Total: 2,803
  - Density: 998.6/km^{2} (2,586/sq mi)
  - Change 2016-21: ▲6.2%
  - Dwellings: 1,502
- Time zone: UTC−5 (EST)
  - Summer (DST): UTC−4 (EDT)
- Postal code(s): J0K 2N0
- Area codes: 450, 579
- Highways: R-347 R-348
- Website: www.ville.stgabriel.qc.ca

Saint-Gabriel (French pronunciation: [sɛ̃ ɡabʁijɛl]) is a town in the Lanaudière region of Quebec, Canada, part of the D'Autray Regional County Municipality. It is located on the shores of Lake Maskinongé, in the shadows of the Laurentian Mountains.

== History ==
The first settlers were Loyalists, Irish, and Scottish, arriving around 1825 to the shores of Lake Maskinongé, where they formed a community that was known as Lake Maskinongé Settlement by 1827, and later as the Mission of Lac-Maskinongé. In 1837, the name Saint-Gabriel-du-Lac-Maskinongé came in use but was changed to Saint-Gabriel-de-Brandon in 1840. This name refers to the angel Gabriel and the geographic township of Brandon that was proclaimed in 1827 and in which it is located.

In 1851, the Parish of Saint-Gabriel-de-Brandon was founded and the post office opened that same year. In 1855, the Saint-Gabriel-de-Brandon Parish Municipality was established and the town of Saint-Gabriel remained part of this parish municipality until 1892, when it separated and became the Village Municipality of Saint-Gabriel-de-Brandon. In 1967, it changed its status and name to Ville de Saint-Gabriel by then Mayor Yvan Comeau.

== Demographics ==
In the 2021 Census of Population conducted by Statistics Canada, Saint-Gabriel had a population of 2,803 living in 1,366 of its 1,502 total private dwellings, a change of 6.2% from its 2016 population of 2,640. With a land area of 2.81 km^{2} (1.08 sq mi), it had a population density of 997.5/km^{2} (2,583.5/sq mi) in 2021.

Historical census populations – Saint-Gabriel, Quebec

Year	Pop.	±%
1901	1,199	—
1911	1,602	+33.6%
1921	1,667	+4.1%
1931	1,530	−8.2%
1941	1,632	+6.7%
1951	2,661	+63.1%
1956	3,265	+22.7%

Year	Pop.	±%
1961	3,425	+4.9%
1966	3,464	+1.1%
1971	3,383	−2.3%
1976	3,271	−3.3%
1981	3,161	−3.4%
1986	2,929	−7.3%
1991	2,710	−7.5%

Year	Pop.	±%
1996	2,862	+5.6%
2001	2,775	−3.0%
2006	2,828	+1.9%
2011	2,844	+0.6%
2016	2,640	−7.2%
2021	2,803	+6.2%

Source: Statistics Canada

Mother tongue (2021):

- English as first language: 1.5%
- French as first language: 94.7%
- English and French as first languages: 0.9%
- Other as first language: 2.7%

== Education ==
The Sir Wilfrid Laurier School Board operates anglophone public schools, including:

- Joliette Elementary School in Saint-Charles-Borromée
- Joliette High School in Joliette

== See also ==
- List of cities in Quebec
