= Saint-Côme, Quebec =

Saint-Côme
- Municipality
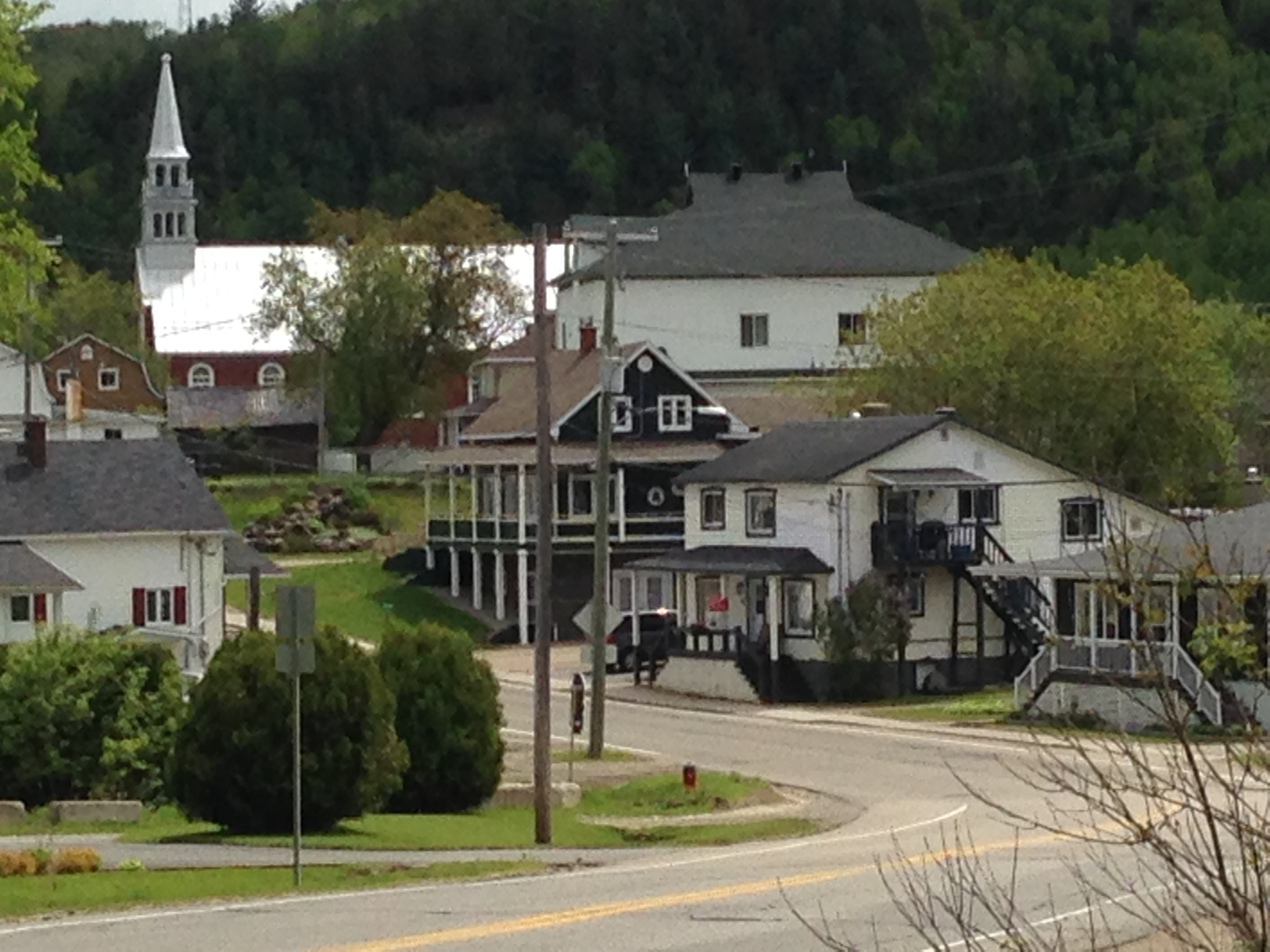

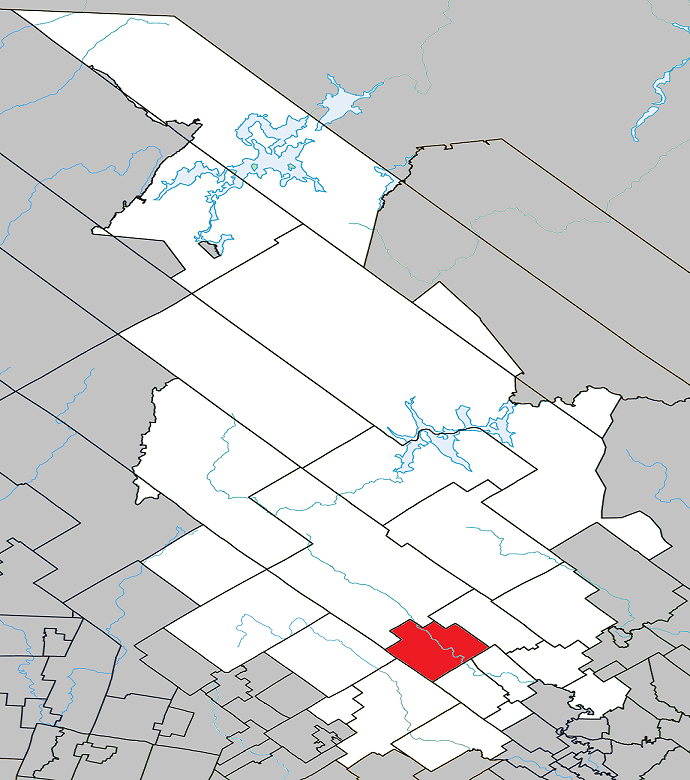
- Location within Matawinie RCM

- Location in central Quebec
- Coordinates: 46°16′08″N 73°46′29″W
- Country: Canada
- Province: Quebec
- Region: Lanaudière
- RCM: Matawinie
- Constituted: January 1, 1873

Government
  - Mayor: Simon Beaudry (since 2025)
  - Federal riding: Joliette—Manawan
  - Prov. riding: Berthier

Area
  - Total: 169.30 km^{2} (65.37 sq mi)
  - Land: 164.89 km^{2} (63.66 sq mi)

Population (2021)
  - Total: 2,583
  - Density: 15.7/km^{2} (41/sq mi)
  - Pop 2016-2021: ▲17.8%
  - Dwellings: 2,365
- Time zone: UTC−5 (EST)
  - Summer (DST): UTC−4 (EDT)
- Postal code(s): J0K 2B0
- Area codes: 450 and 579
- Highways: R-343; R-347
- Website: www.stcomelanaudiere.ca

Saint-Côme (French pronunciation: [sɛ̃ kom]) is a municipality in the Lanaudière region of Quebec, Canada, part of the Matawinie Regional County Municipality.

== Demographics ==
=== Population ===
Historical Census Data - Saint-Côme, Quebec
Year	Pop.	±%
1991	1,710	—
1996	1,921	+12.3%
2001	1,923	+0.1%
2006	2,161	+12.4%
2011	2,198	+1.7%
2016	2,193	−0.2%
2021	2,583	+17.8%

Private dwellings occupied by usual residents: 1319 (total dwellings: 2365)

=== Language ===
Mother tongue:

- English as first language: 1.4%
- French as first language: 96.7%
- English and French as first language: 0.4%
- Other as first language: 1.6%

== Education ==
The Commission scolaire des Samares operates francophone public schools, including:

- École primaire de Saint-Côme

The Sir Wilfrid Laurier School Board operates anglophone public schools, including:

- Joliette Elementary School in Saint-Charles-Borromée
- Joliette High School in Joliette

== See also ==
- Mont-Tremblant National Park
