= Saint-Gabriel-de-Brandon =

- Municipality
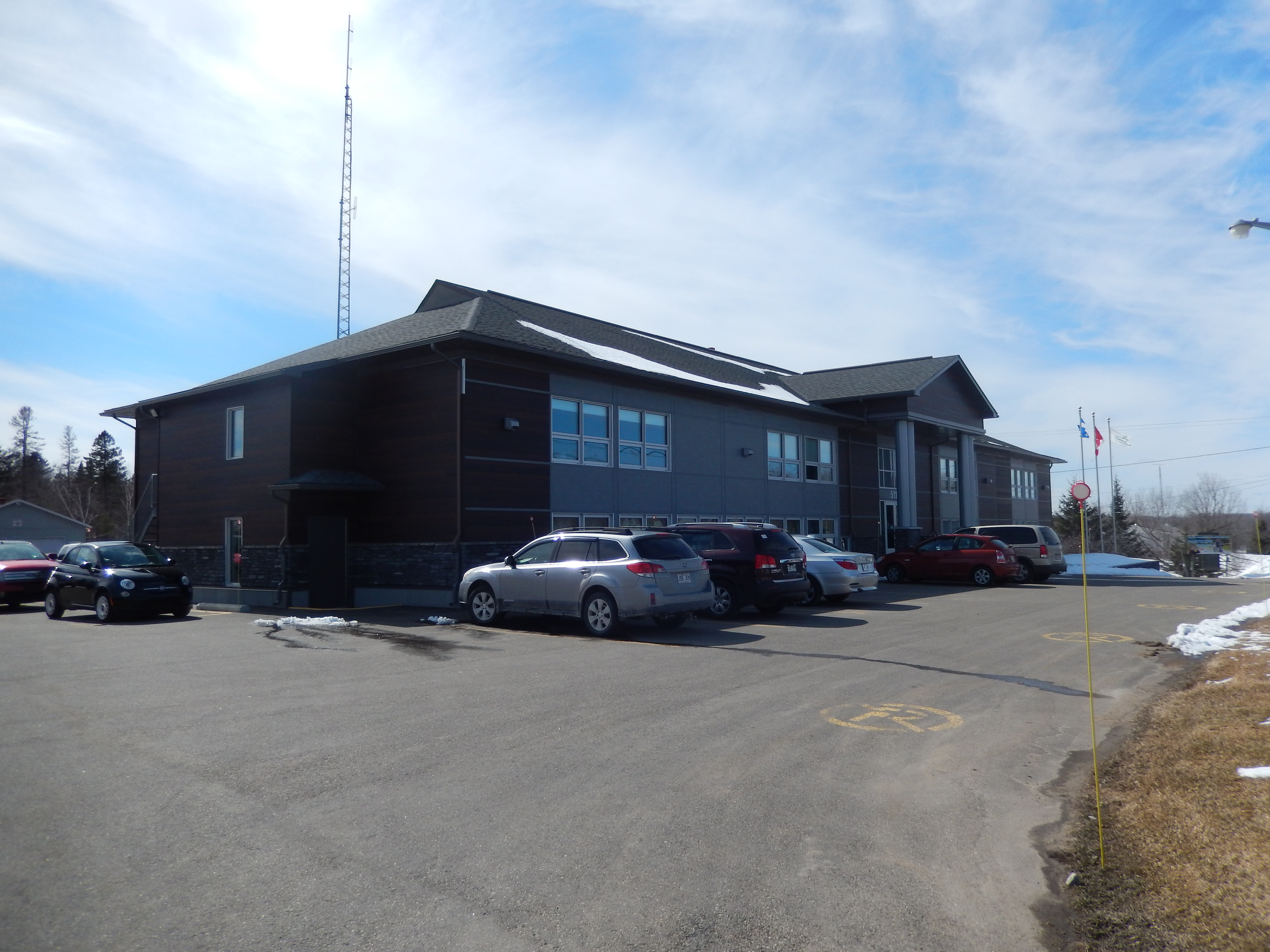
- Town hall of St-Gabriel-de-Brandon
- Motto: Chez nous vous êtes chez vous (English: With us you are at home)
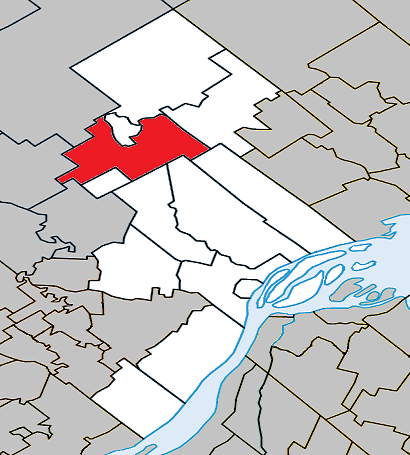
- Location within D'Autray RCM

- Location in central Quebec
- Coordinates: 46°16′N 73°23′W
- Country: Canada
- Province: Quebec
- Region: Lanaudière
- RCM: D'Autray
- Settled: 1825
- Constituted: June 30, 1864

Government
  - Mayor: Mario Frigon
  - Fed. riding: Berthier—Maskinongé
  - Prov. riding: Berthier

Area
  - Total: 101.15 km^{2} (39.05 sq mi)
  - Land: 99.23 km^{2} (38.31 sq mi)

Population (2021)
  - Total: 2,684
  - Density: 27/km^{2} (70/sq mi)
  - Change 2016-21: ▲1.9%
  - Dwellings: 1,585
- Time zone: UTC−5 (EST)
  - Summer (DST): UTC−4 (EDT)
- Postal code(s): J0K 2N0
- Area codes: 450, 579
- Highways: R-347 R-348
- Website: saintgabrieldebrandon.com

Saint-Gabriel-de-Brandon is a municipality in the D'Autray Regional County Municipality in the Lanaudière region of Quebec, Canada.

== History ==
The first settlers, mostly Irish and Scottish Loyalists, came around 1825 to the shores of Lake Maskinongé, where they formed a community that was known as Lake Maskinongé Settlement by 1827, and later as the Mission of Lac-Maskinongé. In 1837, the name Saint-Gabriel-du-Lac-Maskinongé came in use but was changed to Saint-Gabriel-de-Brandon in 1840. This name refers to the angel Gabriel and the geographic township of Brandon that was proclaimed in 1827 and in which it is located.

In 1851, the Parish of Saint-Gabriel-de-Brandon was founded and the post office opened that same year. In 1855, the parish municipality was established with the same name.

In 1892, the main settlement on Lake Maskinongé separated from the parish municipality and became the Village Municipality of Saint-Gabriel-de-Brandon (now known as the Town of Saint-Gabriel).

On June 14, 2014, Saint-Gabriel-de-Brandon changed from parish municipality to a (regular) municipality.

== Demographics ==
Historical census populations – Saint-Gabriel-de-Brandon

Year	Pop.	±%
1861	3,962	—
1871	4,199	+6.0%
1881	3,454	−17.7%
1891	3,735	+8.1%
1901	2,154	−42.3%
1911	1,960	−9.0%
1921	1,170	−40.3%
1931	923	−21.1%

Year	Pop.	±%
1941	936	+1.4%
1951	1,026	+9.6%
1956	903	−12.0%
1961	1,184	+31.1%
1966	1,225	+3.5%
1971	1,304	+6.4%
1976	1,519	+16.5%
1981	1,758	+15.7%

Year	Pop.	±%
1986	2,042	+16.2%
1991	2,161	+5.8%
1996	2,608	+20.7%
2001	2,590	−0.7%
2006	2,800	+8.1%
2011	2,679	−4.3%
2016	2,635	−1.6%
2021	2,684	+1.9%

Population counts are not adjusted for boundary changes.
Source: Statistics Canada

Private dwellings occupied by usual residents (2021): 1,304 (total dwellings: 1,585)

Mother tongue (2021):

- English as first language: 0.7%
- French as first language: 97.0%
- English and French as first languages: 0.9%
- Other as first language: 1.3%

== Education ==
The Commission scolaire des Samares operates francophone public schools:

- École secondaire Bermon

The Sir Wilfrid Laurier School Board operates anglophone public schools, including:

- Joliette Elementary School in Saint-Charles-Borromée
- Joliette High School in Joliette

== See also ==
- List of municipalities in Quebec
