= List of former Quebec provincial highways =

Former routes in Quebec

Former Quebec provincial highways
- Highway markers for Routes 1, 17, and 108.

System information
- Maintained by Transports Québec
- Notes: Decommissioned in 1972.

Highway names
- Provincial: Quebec Route XX (Route XX)

System links
- Quebec provincial highways; Autoroutes; List; Former

All Routes under 100 were renumbered in the 1970s. Some are now Routes in the 100-range; others became Autoroutes. Autoroutes are numbered under 100 and above 400, and the conflicting range was changed.

== History ==
Quebec highways were first numbered in 1923. The network was substantially increased in 1927 and 1928 and a revised numbering system was published in November 1928 and made official from 1 January 1929. The 1929 route system, with some alterations, remained in use until the end of 1971.

Prior to the early 1970s, Quebec's provincial routes were numbered from 1-108. With the development and subsequent expansion of the Autoroute system, as well as an effort to simplify route connections and reduce motorist confusion. First proposed in 1966 with the intent of being implemented for Expo 67, the changes did not occur until the early 1970s. As part of the renumbering, the present blue Autoroute and green Provincial highway shields were introduced.

== Former route list ==
- Route 1, from Montreal to Quebec City, via Sherbrooke, now Route 112 and Route 171.
- Route 2, Rivière-Beaudette to Dégelis. Originally part of an interprovincial Route 2 that connected Ontario (ON Highway 2) to New Brunswick (NB Route 2), and further to Nova Scotia (Trunk 2).
- Route 2A, now Route 230.
- Route 2B, now Autoroute 520 in Montreal.
- Route 2C, now Route 138 in Quebec City.
- Route 3, now Route 132 between New York State and Levis.
- Route 3A, now Route 201.
- Route 4 from New York State to Montreal, the routing of Route 138 south of the Saint Lawrence River.
- Route 5, now Route 143 and Route 116 from Stanstead to Quebec City; originally a continuation of US 5.
- Route 6, now Route 132 around the Gaspe Peninsula.
- Route 6A, now Route 197.
- Route 7, now Route 133, Route 104 and Route 112 from Vermont (Interstate 89) to Montreal (Victoria Bridge); originally a continuation of US 7.
- Route 8, now Route 148 from Laval to Gatineau.
- Route 8A, now Route 344 from the Grenville Interprovincial Bridge to Route 148.
- Route 9, from New York State to Montreal, extending US 9 along present Autoroute 15 right of way, then to Quebec City following Autoroute 20.
- Route 9A, now Route 221 and Route 217. While the number may suggest a continuation of New York State Route 9A, that road never existed on the US side in that part of New York State.
- Route 9B, now Route 223, Route 104 and Route 134; originally a continuation of New York Route 9B
- Route 9C, now Route 132.
- Route 10, now a section of Route 132 between Rivière-du-Loup and Matane.
- Route 11, now a section of Route 117, and Route 105.
- Route 11A, now Route 117.
- Route 12, now Route 233 and Route 137.
- Route 13, now Route 139, Route 143, Autoroute 20 and former Route 155.
- Route 14, now Route 201.
- Route 15, now Route 138.
- Route 15A, now Route 362.
- Route 15B, now Route 360.
- Route 16, now Route 170 and Route 372.
- Route 16A, now Route 170.
- Route 17, now partly Autoroute 40, Route 342, and Autoroute 20 into Montreal; originally a continuation of Ontario Highway 17.
- Route 18, now Autoroute 25/Route 125.
- Route 19, now Route 155.
- Route 19A, now Route 159.
- Route 19B, now Route 153.
- Route 20, now Route 122.
- Route 21, now Route 133.
- Route 22, now Route 147, Route 143 and Route 122.
- Route 23, now Route 173.
- Route 24, now Route 204.
- Route 25, now Route 281.
- Route 25A, now Route 279.
- Route 26, now Route 283.
- Route 27, now Route 253.
- Route 27A, now Route 210.
- Route 28, now Route 108.
- Route 29, now Route 344.
- Route 30, now Route 329.
- Route 31, now Route 327.
- Route 32 now Route 116 and Route 255.
- Route 33, now Route 341.
- Route 34, now Route 161.
- Route 35, now Route 309.
- Route 36, now Route 205, Route 209 and Route 219.
- Route 37 now local roads in Montreal. It ran around the perimeter of the Island of Montreal.
- Route 38, now local roads in Laval. It ran around the perimeter of Île Jésus.
- Route 39, now Route 243.
- Route 40, now Route 104.
- Route 40A, now Route 104.
- Route 41, now Route 158.
- Route 42, now Route 158, Route 343 and Route 347.
- Route 43, now Route 347 and Route 131.
- Route 43A, now Route 348.
- Route 44, now Route 349.
- Route 45, now Route 386 and Route 111.
- Route 46, now Route 101.
- Route 47, now Route 223.
- Route 48, now Route 343 and Route 131.
- Route 49, now Route 218, Route 265 and Route 165.
- Route 50, now Route 141.
- Route 51, now Route 289.
- Route 52, now Route 202.
- Route 53, now Route 277.
- Route 54, now Route 175.
- Route 54A, now Route 169.
- Route 54B, now Boulevard Henri-Bourassa and Boulevard Talbot in Quebec City.
- Route 54C, now 1re Avenue in Quebec City.
- Route 55, now Route 169 around Lac Saint-Jean.
- Route 56, now Route 381.
- Route 57, now Route 323.
- Route 58, now Route 117 and Route 113.
- Route 59, now Route 117.
- Route 60, now Route 111.
- Route 61, now Route 109.
- Route 62, now Route 382.
- Route 63, now Route 393.
- Route 64, now Route 397.
- Route 65, now Route 335.
- Route 68, now Route 225.
- Route 105A, now Chemin de la Vallée-Missisquoi. A continuation of Vermont Route 105A. There was never a Route 105 under the old system.
- Route 108, now Route 237. A continuation of Vermont Route 108.
- R-185, now Autoroute 85.

== See also ==
- List of Quebec provincial highways
