= Highways in Quebec =

- Standard highway markers for Quebec

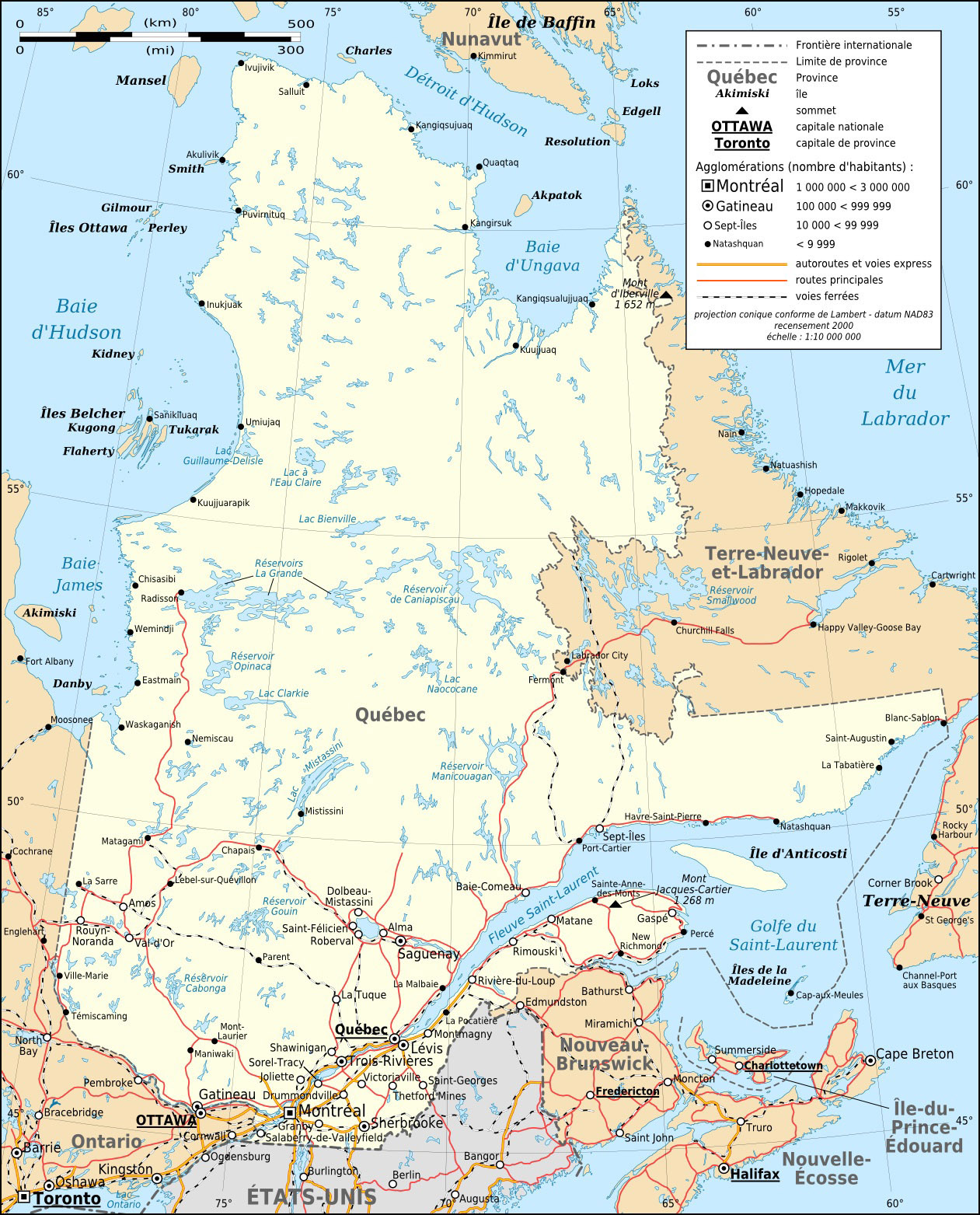
- Major highways in Quebec

System information
- Maintained by Transports Québec

Highway names
- Autoroutes (freeways): Quebec Autoroute XX (A-XX)
- Provincial Highways: Quebec Route XX (Route XX)

System links
- Quebec provincial highways; Autoroutes; List; Former

Transports Québec is responsible for managing about 185,000 kilometres (115,000 mi) of highways and roads in Quebec. In addition, Quebec has almost 12,000 bridges, tunnels, retaining walls, culverts, and other structures such as the Quebec Bridge, the Pierre Laporte Bridge, the Laviolette Bridge and the Louis-Hippolyte Lafontaine Bridge–Tunnel.

The highway network connects all regions and neighbouring provinces, and is concentrated mainly around the major urban areas of Montreal and Quebec City.

== Classes of highways ==
The province's network is divided into eight different categories of roads. The five largest categories are managed by the ministère des Transports du Québec, also known by its short name Transports Québec or the acronym MTQ. The three smallest categories are managed by the cities and municipalities of Quebec.

The rest of the roadways are mostly managed by companies such as Hydro-Quebec or by various departments, such as the Ministry of Energy and Natural Resources.

Class	Definition
Five Categories of Routes Managed by the Québec Ministry of Transportation (MTQ)
Highways	Autoroutes (freeways) featuring limited traffic access at high speed with no subdivisions that does not include, without exception, a level intersection.
Provincial routes	Main highways other than autoroutes, connecting major urban areas. Tourist routes and access to major national or international facilities such as airports and sea crossings.
Regional routes	These highways connect secondary urban agglomerations with each other, and between them and the main cities. They also allow access to regional infrastructures.
Collector routes	Highways linking rural agglomerations with each other and with nearby urban centres, or secondary links between small urban agglomerations.
Resource roads	These are roads providing access to forest, mineral, or hydroelectric resources in remote areas.
Three Categories of Routes Managed by Municipalities
Level 1 local roads	Roads connecting rural centres with each other.
Level 2 local roads	Roads giving access to permanently inhabited rural properties.
Level 3 local roads	Roads allowing access to uninhabited properties throughout the year. A city's residential streets are also part of this class.

== Provincial highways ==
The highways of the MTQ are main roads that crisscross the province. To serve the vast territory of Quebec, the MTQ manages a network of more than 20,000 kilometres of roads, mainly in the south of the province. These roads are the only numbered roads in the province. Quebec does not have county roads as does Ontario or departmental roads as in France. All highways and major roads, whether regional or provincial, fall under the MTQ.

As of 2019, Quebec has 31 autoroutes, 45 provincial roads, and 129 regional and secondary roads.

=== Autoroutes ===
The Autoroute (freeway) system in Quebec is a network of expressways which operate under the same principle of controlled access as the Interstate Highway System in the United States or the 400-Series Highways in neighbouring Ontario.

=== Trans-Canada Highway ===
The Trans-Canada Highway follows various provincial highways. Its roadways are marked with a distinctive white-on-green shield used in the rest of Canada, placed below the provincial shield. As the Trans-Canada Highway lacks a national numeric designation in the province, the signs are numberless (as shown below).

=== Numbering ===
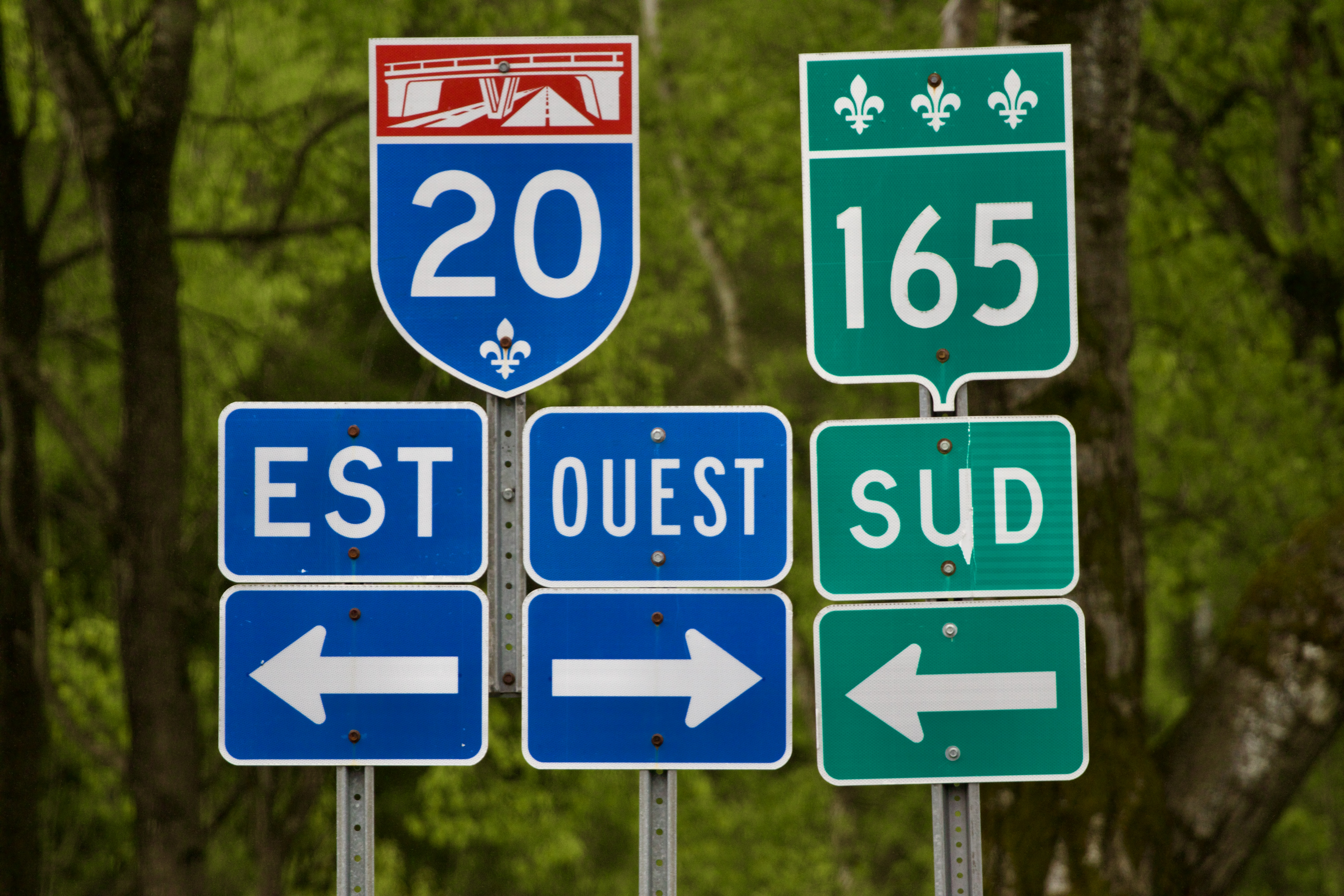
Road signs showing directions for Autoroute 20 and Route 165 in Quebec.

In general, odd-numbered routes run perpendicular to the St. Lawrence River (along the north-south axis) while even-numbered routes parallel the river (east-west). The roads are numbered from west to east and from south to north. For example, highway 105, 155 and 195 are respectively located in Outaouais (west), Mauricie (centre) and Bas-St-Laurent (east). And Route 112 is parallel to the river between the border and this one, the 132 borders it on its south bank, while the 138 does the same on its north bank.

Each type of highway has its own numbering series. For example, autoroutes are numbered from 0 to 99 and from 400 to 999, while main or national routes are numbered from 100 to 199, and secondary routes are numbered between 200 and 399.

The numbering of the secondary roads is subdivided by the St. Lawrence River; the 200 series includes roads located south of the river, the numbering begins in Montérégie and ends in Gaspésie, while the 300 series is located north of the river. The numbering begins in the Outaouais, continues into Nord-du-Québec, and ends in Abitibi (390 to 399).

There are some exceptions to these rules. For example, Route 162 parallel to the river is located between Route 116 and Route 132 – the number does not correspond to the location in the network. It is probably numbered this way because of its proximity to roads 161 and 165 which are perpendicular to the river. There is also Route 198, in the Gaspésie Park, which connects L'Anse-Pleureuse to Gaspé, via Murdochville. It is located in the centre of the loop made by the 132 in the Gaspé Peninsula. Its location (surrounded by a loop road) or its proximity to routes 195, 197, and 299 could explain its numbering.

In addition, Route 201 is located on both banks of the river and is the only secondary road to cross the St. Lawrence River. In Bas-Saint-Laurent, two roads perpendicular to the river have even numbers, 296 and 298 . This situation is created due to the depletion of odd numbers in the 200 series. It would be appropriate for a road in the western part of the province (Montérégie and Estrie) and not for a road in the east of the province as are Routes 296 and 298. Thus, it was chosen to number them with even numbers in the same order of magnitude as the other perpendicular roads in the sector (291, 293, 295, and 297).

There are also some inconsistencies in the order of the roads. For example, 213 is further east than 237. This is due to the late addition of routes to the system and the unavailability of more appropriate numbers.

== Local network ==
Local roads link rural centres and properties together and each municipality has its own way of identifying streets. Several use small green rectangular street signs, which is often installed on stop signs.

There are also special road improvements. This part of the local network is often administered by independent organizations or federations. These developments often take the form of creating a bicycle path along unpaved or reduced width roadways.

== Signage ==
Because Canada has not adopted the Vienna Convention on Road Signs, road signs are under the jurisdiction of each province, so Quebec has established its own sign system.

- Speed limit signs are on black rectangular panels with a white background.
- National and regional highways are identified by white numbers on a green-bottomed shield and with three fleurs-de-lis symbols along the top.
- Autoroutes show white numbers against a blue shield.
- Signs related to directions, distances, and junctions are all of green color with white writing.
- Natural attractions, such as rivers, mountains, parks, reserves, or rest areas, are indicated on brown panels with white writing.
- Tourist attractions, such as golf courses, ski resorts, hotels, and campgrounds, are indicated on blue panels.

The lane markings along the roadway include a continuous white line along each side of the road's outside edge.

The centre line can have one or two yellow lines, continuous or not, depending on the road. When there are two continuous yellow lines, no vehicles are allowed to overtake, or pass, vehicles ahead of them. When one of the lines is continuous and the other is a dotted or dashed line, then the vehicles next to the dotted line are allowed to overtake vehicles ahead, while the vehicles next to the continuous line are not permitted to overtake. When the centre line shows two dotted lines side-by-side, or only a single dotted line, then vehicles in both directions are permitted to overtake those ahead of them when it is safe to do so. Wider roads have only a yellow centre line.

Sample Quebec route shields
Trans-Canada Highway marker

Quebec Autoroutes

Quebec national and regional routes

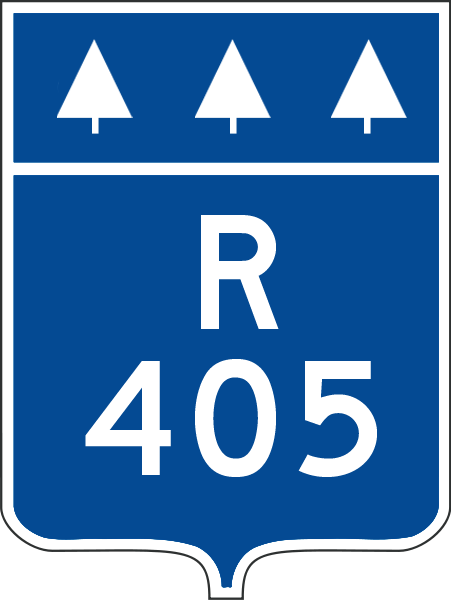
Quebec forest roads

Provincial snowmobile trails

Route verte (green road) cycle tracks

== See also ==
- Autoroutes of Quebec
- Chemin du Roy
- List of Quebec provincial highways
- List of former Quebec provincial highways
