= Transports Québec =

Transportation ministry in Quebec

Ministère des Transports et de la Mobilité durable

Agency overview
- Formed: 1969
- Preceding agencies: Ministry of Highways; Ministry of Transports and Communications
- Jurisdiction: Quebec
- Headquarters: Montreal, Quebec
- Employees: 8 500
- Annual budget: 7 308 M$
- Agency executive: Nicolas Girard, Minister
- Parent agency: Province of Quebec
- Website: transports.gouv.qc.ca

The Ministère des Transports et de la Mobilité durable (English: Ministry of Transport and Sustainable Mobility), known by its short form name Transports Québec or alternatively by the acronym MTMD, is a Quebec government ministry responsible for transport, infrastructure and law in Quebec, Canada.

In 2026, the Minister for Transport was Benoit Charette. Since October 2026, the ministry has been headed by Nicolas Girard, who also serves as Minister of Municipal Affairs.

== Role and responsibilities ==
The ministry is responsible for:

- Registration of all vehicles
- Driver licensing
- Driver examination centres
- Provincial highways in the province
- Maintenance of roads and bridges
- Municipal assistance programs, including programs administered through the ministry's public transit and mobility branch.

Note: Based on a structure number, the Ministry of Transport and Sustainable Mobility of Quebec, under the Inventory and inspection of structure s tab, offers a tool that gives a detailed description of the condition of all bridges, culverts, retaining walls and tunnels under the management of the Ministry, by region, road, network. On bridges, numbers are usually found on the bridge. (French)

Structure number for precise location and more information

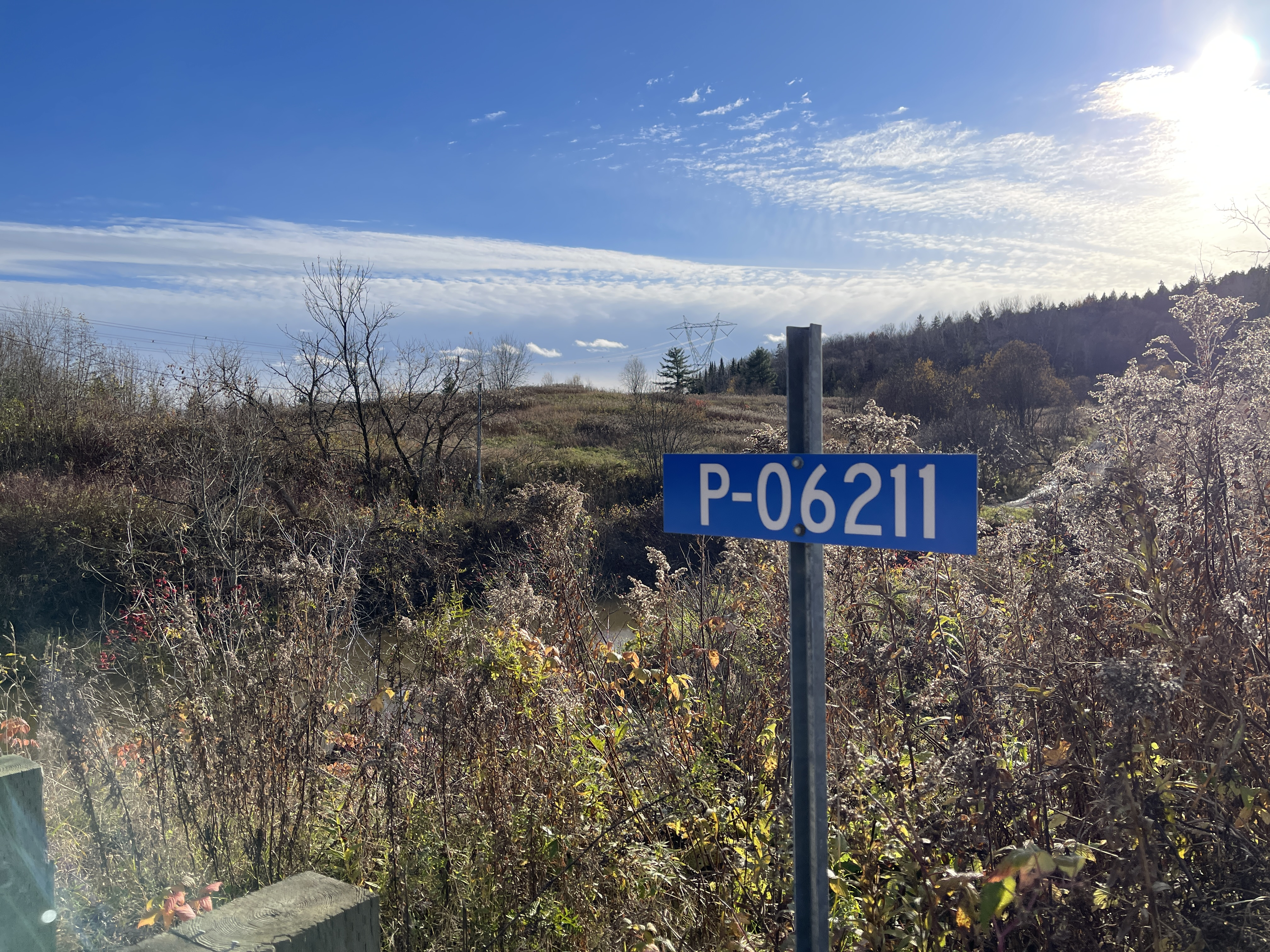
P-06211, above Blanche River, Saint-Ubalde

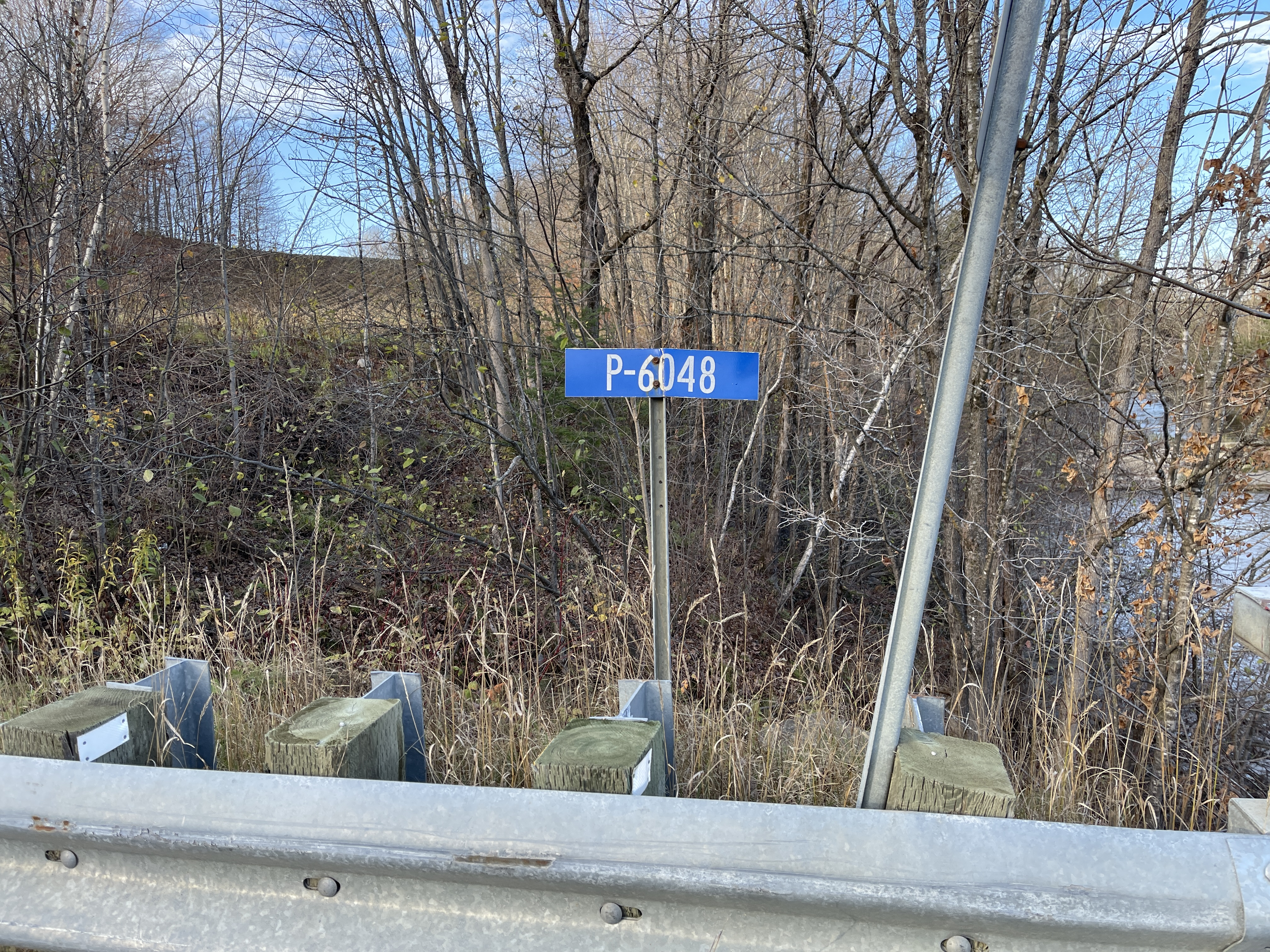
P-6048, rang de la Rivière Blanche, Saint-Alban

=== Service Aérien Gouvernemental ===
Service Aérien Gouvernemental or Government Air Service is the forest firefighting service that was formerly with the Ministry of Government Services. The SAG aviation fleet consists of 8 Bombardier CL-415, 2 CL-215T, and 4 CL-215P.

== Ministers of Transport and Sustainable Mobility ==
- Yvon Marcoux April 29, 2003 – February 18, 2005, QLP
- Michel Després February 18, 2005 – December 18, 2008, QLP
- Julie Boulet December 18, 2008 – August 11, 2010, QLP
- Sam Hamad August 11, 2010 – September 7, 2011, QLP
- Pierre Moreau September 7, 2011 – September 4, 2012, QLP
- Sylvain Gaudreault September 4, 2012 – April 23, 2014, PQ
- Robert Poëti April 23, 2014 – January 28, 2016, QLP
- Jacques Daoust January 28, 2016 – August 19, 2016, QLP
- Laurent Lessard August 19, 2016 – October 11, 2017, QLP
- André Fortin October 11, 2017 – October 18, 2018, QLP
- François Bonnardel October 18, 2018 – October 20, 2022, CAQ
- Geneviève Guilbault October 20, 2022 – September 10, 2025, CAQ
- Jonatan Julien September 10, 2025 – April 21, 2026, CAQ
- Benoit Charette April 21, 2026 – October 21, 2026, CAQ
- Nicolas Girard October 21, 2026 – present, PQ

== See also ==
- Government of Quebec
- Transport Canada
- Politics of Quebec
- Transport in Canada
