= Saint-Thomas, Quebec =

Saint-Thomas
- Municipality
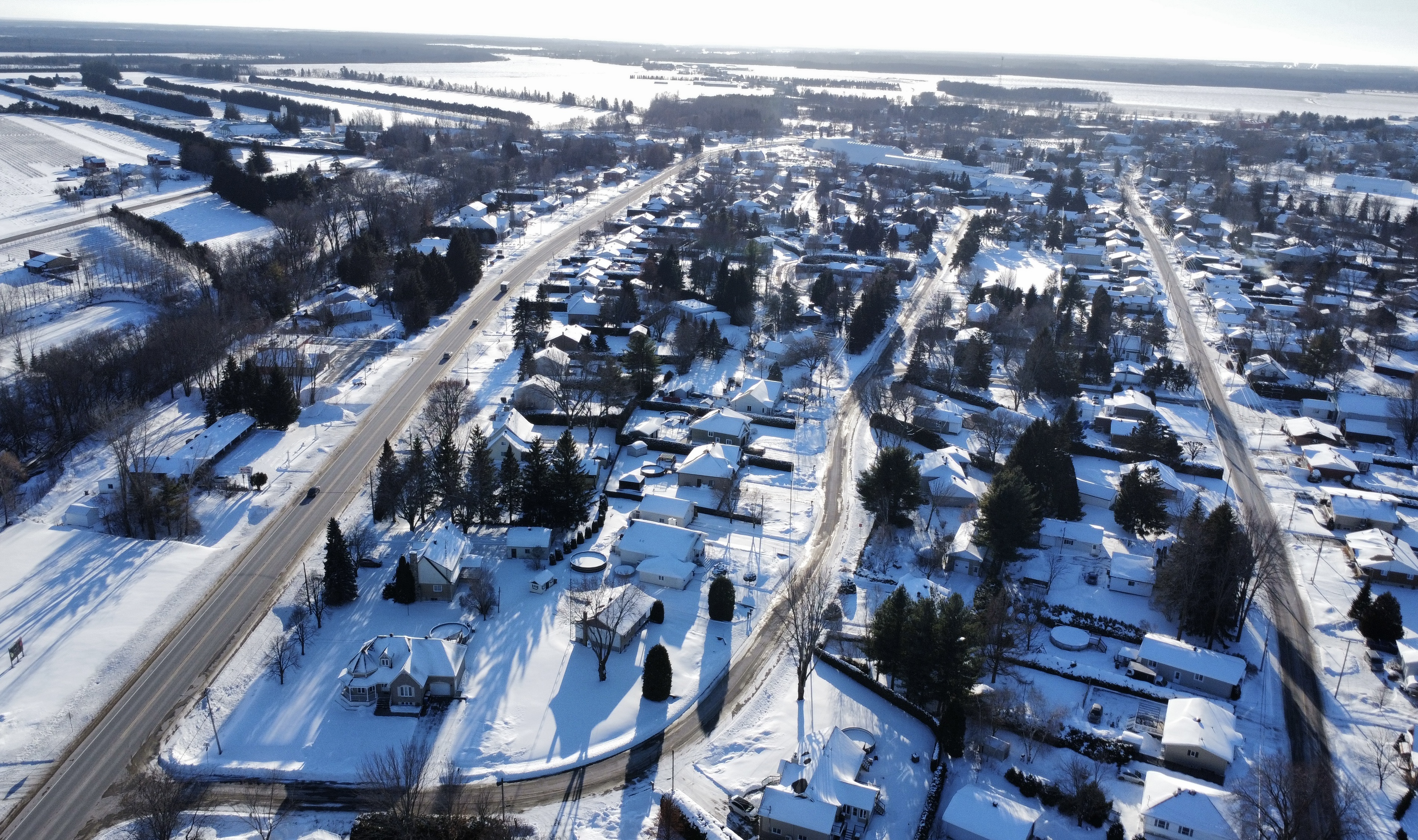

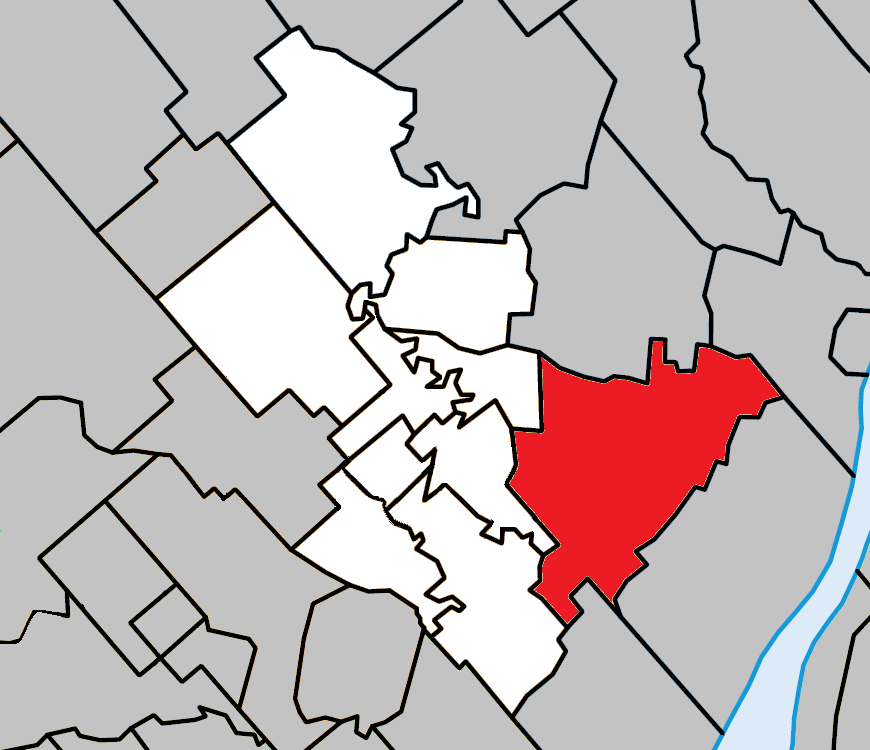
- Location within Joliette RCM.

- Location in central Quebec.
- Coordinates: 46°01′N 73°21′W
- Country: Canada
- Province: Quebec
- Region: Lanaudière
- RCM: Joliette
- Settled: 1790
- Constituted: July 1, 1855

Government
  - Mayor: Marc Corriveau
  - Federal riding: Joliette
  - Prov. riding: Joliette

Area
  - Total: 94.80 km^{2} (36.60 sq mi)
  - Land: 95.05 km^{2} (36.70 sq mi)
- There is an apparent contradiction between two authoritative sources

Population (2011)
  - Total: 3,193
  - Density: 33.6/km^{2} (87/sq mi)
  - Pop 2006-2011: ▲11.6%
  - Dwellings: 1,340
- Time zone: UTC−5 (EST)
  - Summer (DST): UTC−4 (EDT)
- Postal code(s): J0K 3L0
- Area codes: 450 and 579
- Highways A-31: R-131; R-158
- Website: www.saintthomas.qc.ca

Saint-Thomas (French pronunciation: [sɛ̃ tɔma]) is a town in Joliette Regional County Municipality in the Lanaudière region of Quebec, Canada.

Prior to January 22, 1992, it was in D'Autray Regional County Municipality.

== History ==
Starting in 1790, the first few settler families arrived from the La Noraye Seignory and settled in the North and South concessions of the area, then called North Jersey. The origin of this name is not known but may be a phonetic deformation of Chertsey, the name of a neighboring district. In the 1830s, the parish of Sainte-Élisabeth became overcrowded and many of its inhabitants moved to North Jersey, forming a new village called Saint-Thomas-de-North-Jersey from 1838 onwards. That same year, the Parish of Saint-Thomas was formed on November 15. It was named in honour of Thomas-Léandre Brassard (1805-1891), pastor of Sainte-Élisabeth-de-Joliette at that time. By 1839, Saint-Thomas had 930 inhabitants.

In 1845, the Municipality of Saint-Thomas-de-North-Jersey was formed when it separated from parts of Sainte-Élisabeth, Lanoraie, and Saint-Paul-de-Lavaltrie. One of the leading persons advocating for its formation was Louis Voligny, a former French officer who is considered the founder of St. Thomas. He donated land for the construction of the church, the presbytery, and for the establishment of the cemetery. Voligny was also elected as the first mayor and his son Felix Voligny was secretary-treasurer. Consequently, the place was also known as Saint-Thomas-de-Voligny for a period of time.

In 1847, the municipality was abolished but reestablished in 1855 as a parish municipality, with Joseph Masse elected as mayor. In 1993, it changed status and became the Municipality of Saint-Thomas.

Because of Saint-Thomas' sandy soil, tobacco began to be cultivated in the area starting in the 1930s. It became the dominant crop, making Saint-Thomas the national tobacco capital and the largest tobacco producer in the province until 1980. Since then, tobacco has been supplanted by potatoes and is no longer cultivated there.

== Demographics ==
Population trend:

- Population in 2011: 3193 (2006 to 2011 population change: 11.6%)
- Population in 2006: 2861
- Population in 2001: 2915
- Population in 1996: 2987
- Population in 1991: 2748

Private dwellings occupied by usual residents: 1307 (total dwellings: 1340)

Mother tongue:

- English as first language: 0.4%
- French as first language: 96.3%
- English and French as first language: 0%
- Other as first language: 3.3%

== Education ==
The Sir Wilfrid Laurier School Board operates anglophone public schools, including:

- Joliette Elementary School in Saint-Charles-Borromée
- Joliette High School in Joliette

== See also ==
- List of municipalities in Quebec
