= Quebec Route 345 =

Highway in Quebec, Canada

Route 345

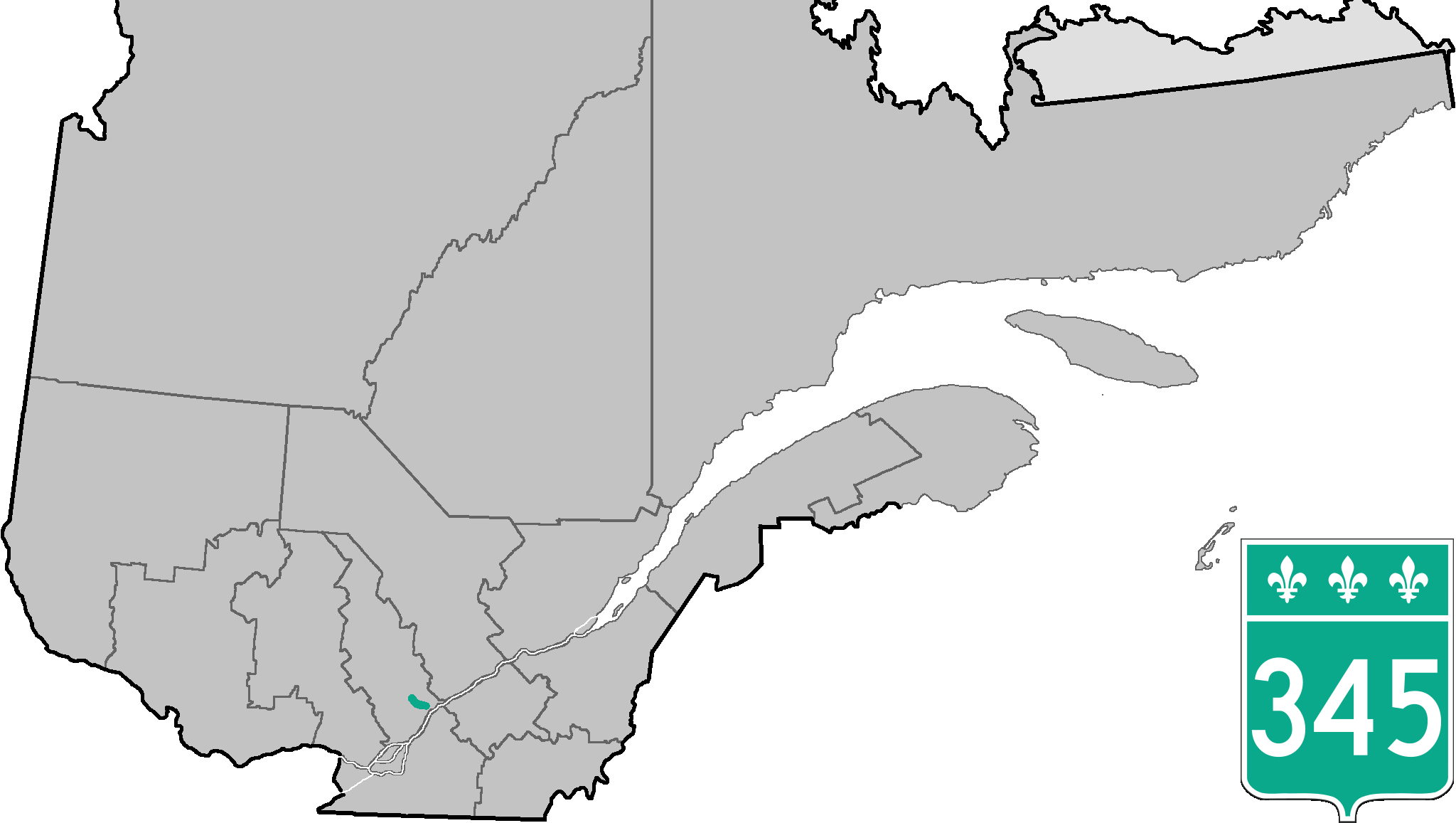

Route information
- Maintained by Transports Québec
- Length: 19.8 km (12.3 mi)

Major junctions
- South end: R-158 in Sainte-Geneviève-de-Berthier
- North end: R-131 in Saint-Félix-de-Valois

Location
- Country: Canada
- Province: Quebec
- Major cities: Saint-Félix-de-Valois

Highway system
- Quebec provincial highways; Autoroutes; List; Former
← R-344	→ R-346

Route 345 is a provincial highway located in the Lanaudière region of Quebec. It runs from the junction of Route 158 in Sainte-Geneviève-de-Berthier and ends at the junction of Route 131 in Saint-Félix-de-Valois.

== Municipalities along Route 345 ==
- Sainte-Geneviève-de-Berthier
- Sainte-Elizabeth
- Saint-Félix-de-Valois

== Major intersections ==
RCM	Location	km	mi	Destinations	Notes
D'Autray	Sainte-Geneviève-de-Berthier	0	0.0	R-158 – Joliette, Berthierville	Rotary; southern terminus
Matawinie	Saint-Félix-de-Valois	12.3	7.6	R-131 (Chemin de Joliette) – Joliette, Saint-Jean-de-Matha	Northern terminus
1.000 mi = 1.609 km; 1.000 km = 0.621 mi

== See also ==
- List of Quebec provincial highways
