= Joliette High School =

Public secondary school in Joliette, Quebec, Canada

Coordinates: 46.0141°N 73.4521°W

Joliette High School (JHS, French: École secondaire Joliette) is a public anglophone secondary school in Joliette, Quebec. Operated by the Sir Wilfrid Laurier School Board, it is the sole anglophone high school in Lanaudière. As of 2017, it had about 265 students.

== Attendance boundary ==
Areas assigned to Joliette High include, but are not limited to:

- D'Autray RCM (almost all areas):
  - Berthierville, La Visitation-de-l'Île-Dupas, Lanoraie, Lavaltrie, Mandeville, Saint-Barthélemy, Saint-Cléophas-de-Brandon, Saint-Cuthbert, Saint-Gabriel, Saint-Gabriel-de-Brandon, Saint-Ignace-de-Loyola, Saint-Norbert, Sainte-Élisabeth, Sainte-Geneviève-de-Berthier
  - Note that Saint-Didace is not in the Joliette High zone
- Joliette RCM (all areas):
  - Crabtree, Joliette, Notre-Dame-des-Prairies, Notre-Dame-de-Lourdes, Saint-Ambroise-de-Kildare, Saint-Charles-Borromée, Sainte-Mélanie, Saint-Paul, Saint-Pierre, Saint-Thomas
- Matawinie RCM (southern areas):
  - Chertsey, Entrelacs, Rawdon, Saint-Alphonse-Rodriguez, Saint-Côme, Saint-Damien, Saint-Félix-de-Valois, Saint-Jean-de-Matha, Saint-Michel-des-Saints, Saint-Zénon, Sainte-Béatrix, Sainte-Émélie-de-l'Énergie, and Sainte-Marcelline-de-Kildare
- Montcalm RCM (all areas):
  - Saint-Alexis, Saint-Calixte, Saint-Esprit, Saint-Jacques, Sainte-Julienne, Saint-Lin-Laurentides, Saint-Liguori, Saint-Roch-de-l'Achigan, Saint-Roch-Ouest, Sainte-Marie-Salomé
