= Sainte-Émélie-de-l'Énergie =

- Municipality
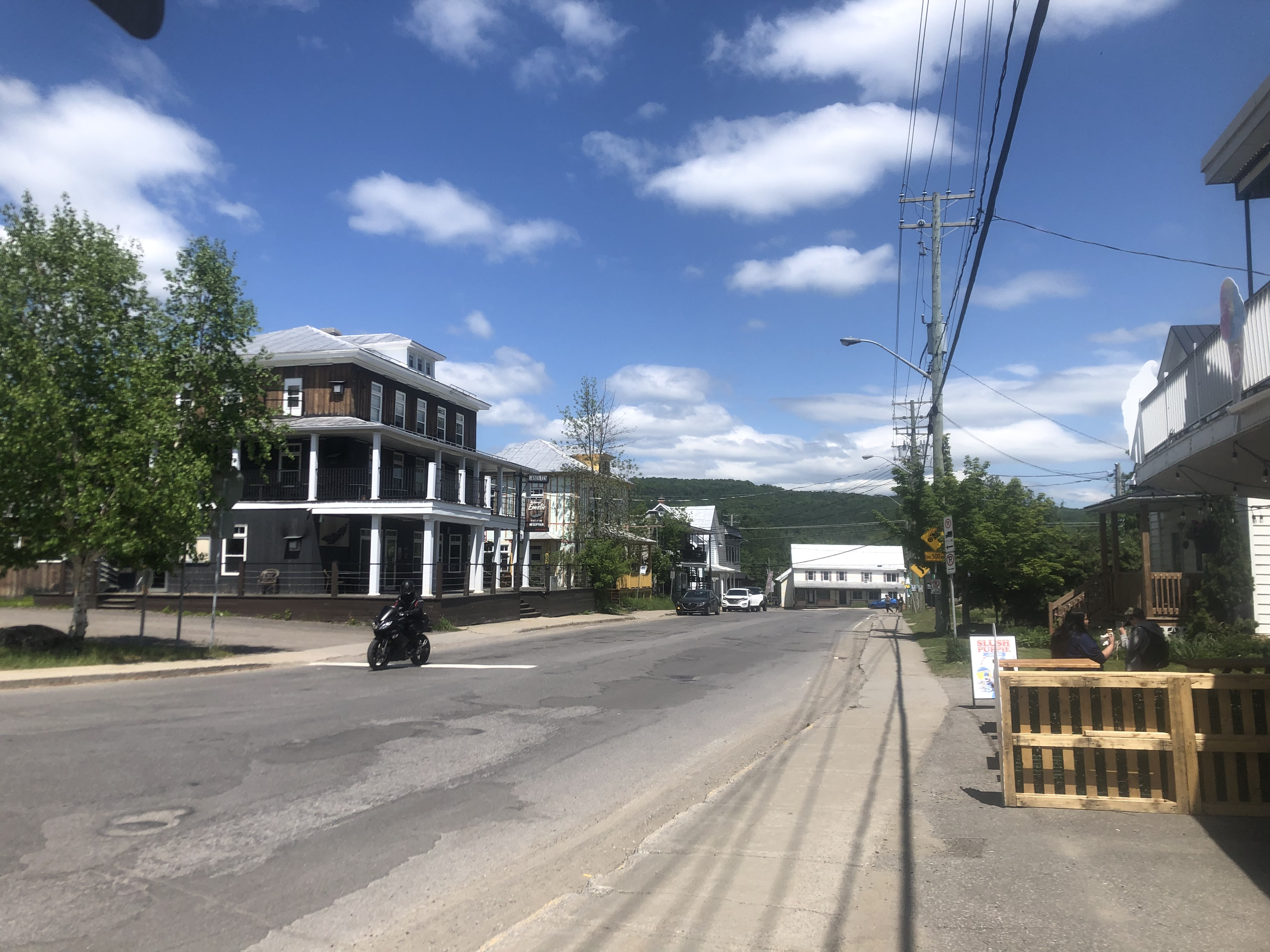

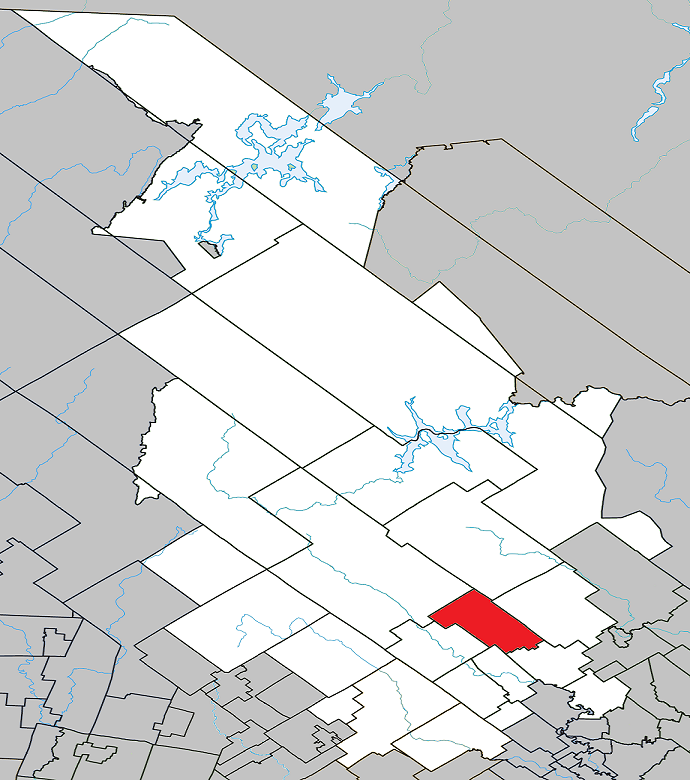
- Location within Matawinie RCM.

- Location in central Quebec.
- Coordinates: 46°19′N 73°39′W
- Country: Canada
- Province: Quebec
- Region: Lanaudière
- RCM: Matawinie
- Settled: 1854
- Constituted: June 10, 1884

Government
  - Mayor: Martin Héroux
  - Federal riding: Joliette—Manawan
  - Prov. riding: Berthier

Area
  - Total: 156.20 km^{2} (60.31 sq mi)
  - Land: 150.08 km^{2} (57.95 sq mi)

Population (2021)
  - Total: 1,741
  - Density: 11.6/km^{2} (30/sq mi)
  - Pop 2016-2021: ▲11.1%
  - Dwellings: 1,142
- Time zone: UTC−5 (EST)
  - Summer (DST): UTC−4 (EDT)
- Postal code(s): J0K 2K0
- Area codes: 450 and 579
- Highways: R-131; R-347
- Website: www.ste-emelie -de-lenergie.qc.ca

Sainte-Émélie-de-l'Énergie (French pronunciation: [sɛ̃t emeli də lenɛʁʒi]) is a municipality in the Lanaudière region of Quebec, Canada, part of the Matawinie Regional County Municipality.

== Geography ==
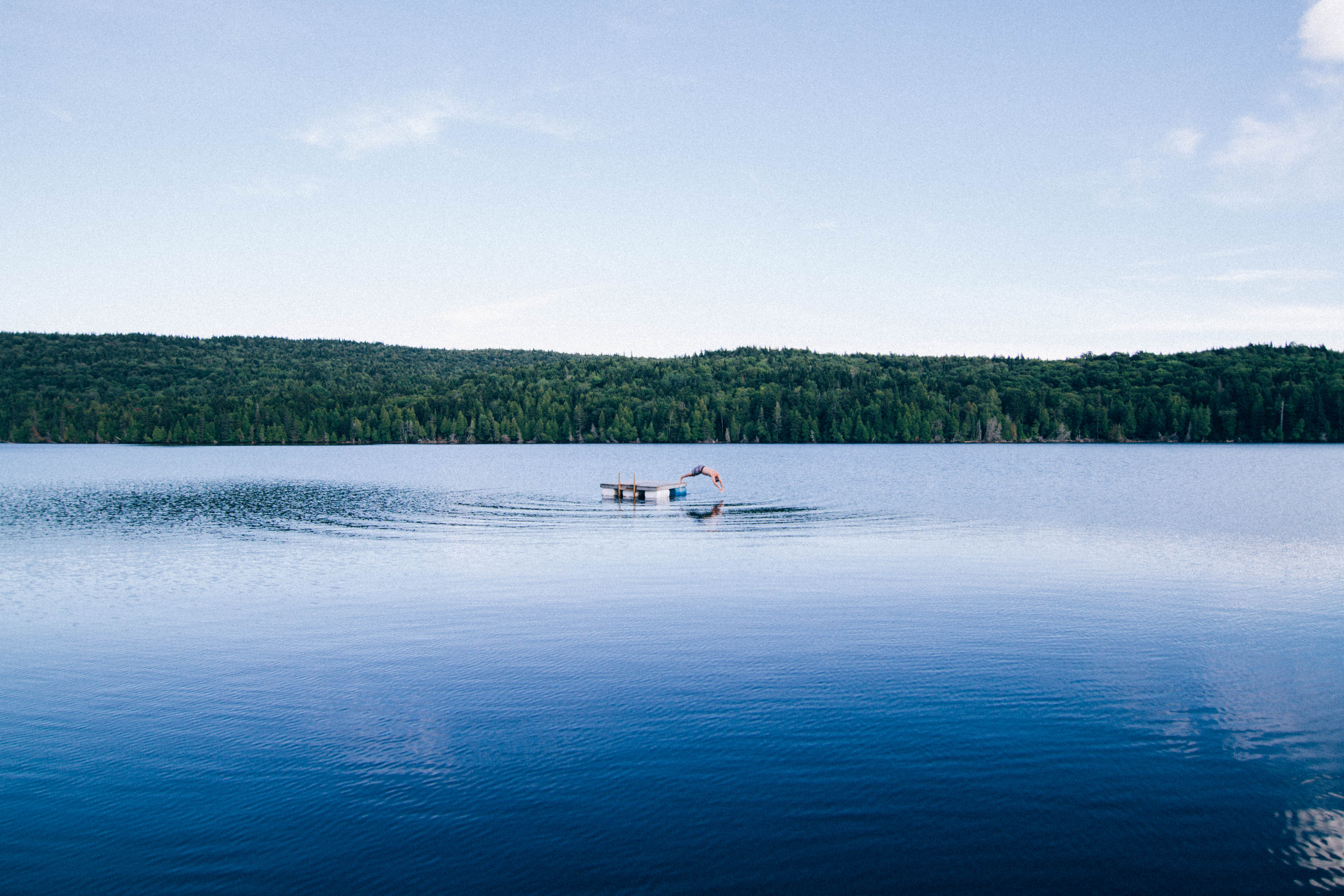

The territory of Sainte-Émélie-de-l'Énergie extends along the Noire River valley in the foothills of the Laurentian Mountains. The village itself is located at the intersection of Routes 131 and 347, in a broad valley called the Grand Lanaudière Corridor, which marks the transition between the Lower and Upper Laurentians. Route 131 winds north through the Noire River valley to Saint-Zénon and Route 347 goes through the Great Corridor to Saint-Côme.

Sainte-Émélie-de-l'Énergie is located in the heart of the Laurentian hardwood zone and its hills are covered by a mixed forest. Tree species include sugar maple, yellow birch and white birch.

== History ==
One of the first settlers was Jean-Antoine Leprohon who arrived in 1854. He was an employee of the Quebec Parliament but had an ambition to found a colony or settlement, as had his cousin Barthélemy Joliette, the founder of the Joliette. In 1870, the Parish of Sainte-Emmélie-de-l'Énergie was formed. This name honors the memory of Émélie or Emmélie, the wife of Leprohon, and the word Énergie (French for "energy") may have referred to the exuberance of his wife or to the rallying cry that Leprohon had to use to keep the other settlers stay around him: "we need energetic settlers here."

In 1884, the Parish Municipality of Sainte-Émélie-de-l'Énergie was established. On May 30, 1924, a large fire engulfed the village, destroying 60 homes and the church. In 1994, the parish municipality changed status to become a municipality.

== Demographics ==
=== Population ===
Historical Census Data - Sainte-Émélie-de-l'Énergie, Quebec

Year	Pop.	±%
1991	1,288	—
1996	1,437	+11.6%
2001	1,500	+4.4%

Year	Pop.	±%
2006	1,681	+12.1%
2011	1,644	−2.2%
2016	1,567	−4.7%

Year	Pop.	±%
2021	1,741	+11.1%

Private dwellings occupied by usual residents: 841 (total dwellings: 1142)

=== Language ===
Mother tongue:

- English as first language: 1.1%
- French as first language: 96.6%
- English and French as first language: 0.6%
- Other as first language: 1.1%

== Education ==
The Centre de services scolaire des Samares operates francophone public schools

- École de l'Ami-Soleil

The Sir Wilfrid Laurier School Board operates anglophone public schools, including:

- Joliette Elementary School in Saint-Charles-Borromée
- Joliette High School in Joliette

== See also ==
- List of municipalities in Quebec
