= Quebec Autoroute 31 =

Highway in Quebec

Autoroute 31
- Autoroute Antonio-Barrette
- A-31 highlighted in red

Route information
- Maintained by Transports Québec
- Length: 14 km (8.7 mi)
- Existed: 1966–present

Major junctions
- South end: A-40 / R-131 in Lavaltrie
- North end: R-131 / R-158 in Joliette

Location
- Country: Canada
- Province: Quebec
- Major cities: Joliette, Lavaltrie, Saint-Thomas

Highway system
- Quebec provincial highways; Autoroutes; List; Former
← A-30	→ A-35

Autoroute 31 (A-31) is an Autoroute in the region of Lanaudière in Quebec. Constructed in 1966, A-31 primarily links Joliette with A-40 and in turn to Montreal, Trois-Rivières, and other points served by Quebec's autoroute system. A-31 is only 14 km (8.7 mi) long, making it one of the shortest autoroutes in the province. It is multiplexed with Route 131 for its entire length.

A-31 carries the name Autoroute Antonio-Barrette, named for a politician from Joliette who briefly served as Premier of Quebec in 1960.

== Route description ==
A-31 begins just south of its interchange with A-40 in Lavaltrie. Motorists exiting A-40 can choose to head north on A-31/Route 131 or south on Route 131 alone to Lavaltrie's city centre. The A-31/A-40 interchange has an unusual configuration, built to accommodate tollbooths that were dismantled.

The freeway runs through farmland for much of its length, with exits at km 2, km 7 and km 12 to serve local roads.

A-31 ends at km 15 at a cloverleaf interchange with Route 158. Plans for Quebec's autoroute system initially called for A-31 to meet A-50 at this interchange. Anticipating this outcome, Route 158 in the immediate vicinity of the interchange was constructed as a limited-access highway and signed as A-50. Once plans to extend the A-50 east of the A-15 were abandoned in the 1980s, this stretch of highway was redesignated Route 158. A series of deadly accidents on Route 158 prompted a 2014 petition drive to reconstruct the highway to Autoroute standards and return the designation of A-50.

Motorists exiting A-31 at km 15 may continue on Route 158 west to Saint-Esprit, Route 158 east to Berthierville, or Route 131 north to Saint-Félix-de-Valois. Past this interchange, A-31 ends and becomes Boulevard Dollard, which continues into downtown Joliette.

== Exit list ==
RCM	Location	km	mi	Exit	Destinations	Notes
D'Autray	Lavaltrie	0.0	0.0	–	R-131 south – Lavaltrie	Southern terminus of concurrency with R-131
D'Autray	Lavaltrie	0.0	0.0	1	A-40 / Rang Saint-François – Québec, Montréal	Partial at-grade intersection; A-40 exit 22
D'Autray	Lavaltrie	1.6	0.99	2	Rang Saint-Henri / Rang du Point-du-Jour	
Joliette	Saint-Thomas	7.3	4.5	7	Saint-Thomas, Saint-Paul	
Joliette	Joliette	11.9	7.4	12	Rue Ernest-Harnois / Rue Nazaire-Laurin	Northbound exit and entrance
Joliette	Joliette	13.4	8.3	14	R-131 north / R-158 – Notre-Dame-des-Prairies, Saint-Michel-des-Saints, Berthierville, Saint-Jérôme	Northern terminus of concurrency with R-131; signed as exits 14E (east) and 14O (west)
Joliette	Joliette	14.0	8.7	–	Boulevard Dollard / Rue Calixa-Lavalleé / Rue Joseph-Arthur – Joliette Centre-Ville	Roundabout; continuation beyond R-158
1.000 mi = 1.609 km; 1.000 km = 0.621 mi: Concurrency terminus; Incomplete access
