= Quebec Route 158 =

Highway in Quebec, Canada

Coordinates: 45.7205°N 74.0757°W

Route 158

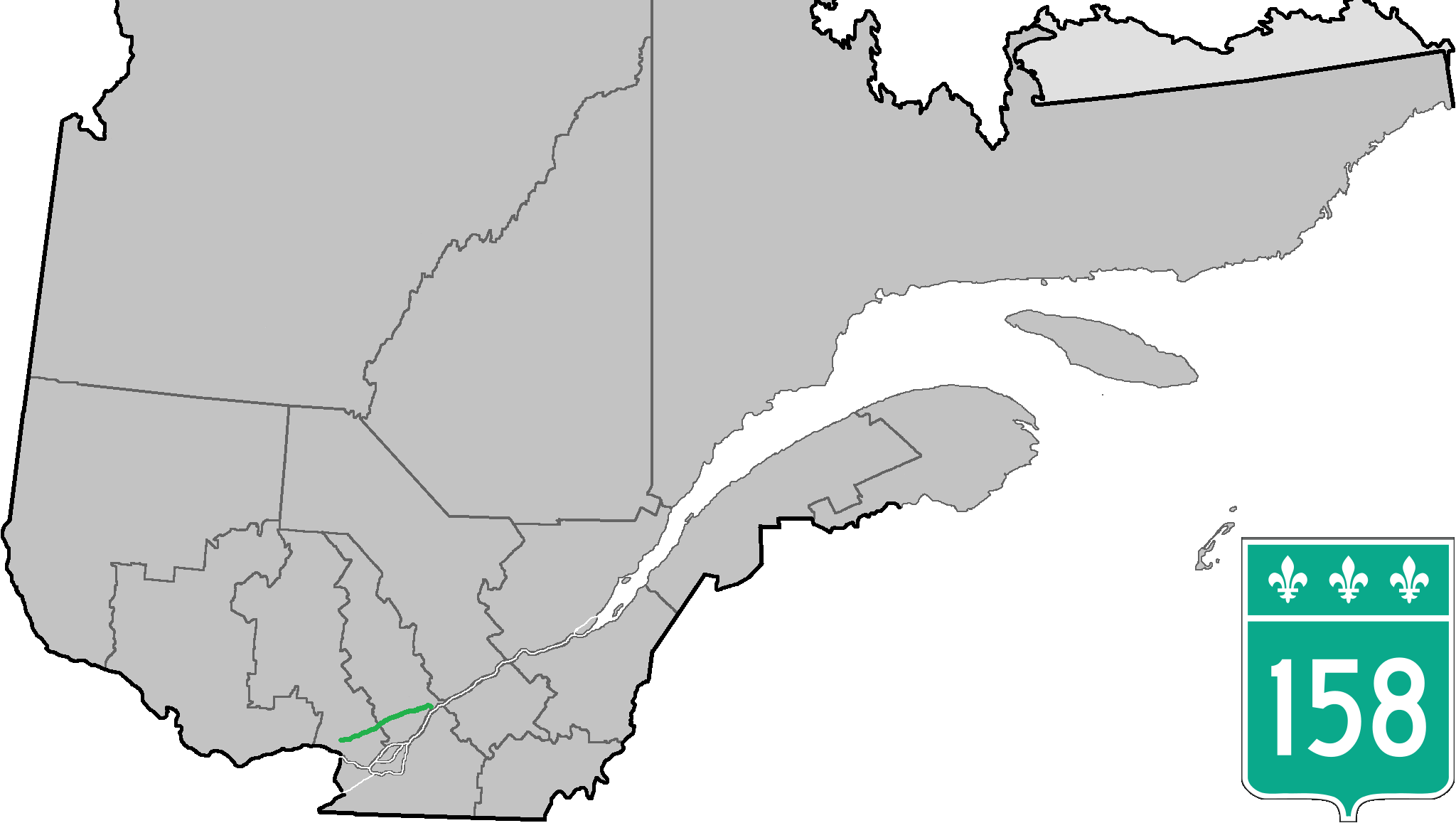

Route information
- Maintained by Transports Québec
- Length: 124.3 km (77.2 mi)
- History: Route 41

Major junctions
- West end: R-148 in Lachute
- A-15 (TCH) / R-148 in Mirabel; R-117 in Saint-Jérôme; A-25 / R-125 in Saint-Esprit; A-31 / R-131 in Joliette; A-40 / R-138 in Berthierville
- East end: Saint-Ignace-de-Loyola ferry terminal

Location
- Country: Canada
- Province: Quebec
- Major cities: Saint-Jérôme, Mirabel, Saint-Lin-Laurentides

Highway system
- Quebec provincial highways; Autoroutes; List; Former
← R-157	→ R-159

Route 158 is an east-west arterial road running between Lachute and Berthierville, north of the Ottawa and Saint Lawrence rivers, in the Laurentides region.

It runs parallel to Autoroute 50 from Lachute to Autoroute 15 near Mirabel Airport, also passing through Joliette. A section of the 158 in Joliette is a four-lane, mostly divided expressway and was intended to be part of an eastern extension of A-50 towards A-40 in Berthierville by-passing several accident-prone sections of Highway 158.

In Berthierville, it junctions with Autoroute 40 and Route 138 and ends on the island municipality of Saint-Ignace-de-Loyola at the Saint Lawrence River, which can be crossed by car ferry to Route 132 in Sorel-Tracy.

== Municipalities along Route 158 ==
- Lachute
- Mirabel
- Saint-Jérôme
- Sainte-Sophie
- Saint-Lin-Laurentides
- Saint-Esprit
- Saint-Alexis
- Saint-Jacques
- Crabtree
- Saint-Paul
- Joliette
- Saint-Thomas
- Sainte-Geneviève-de-Berthier
- Berthierville
- La Visitation-de-l'Île-Dupas
- Saint-Ignace-de-Loyola

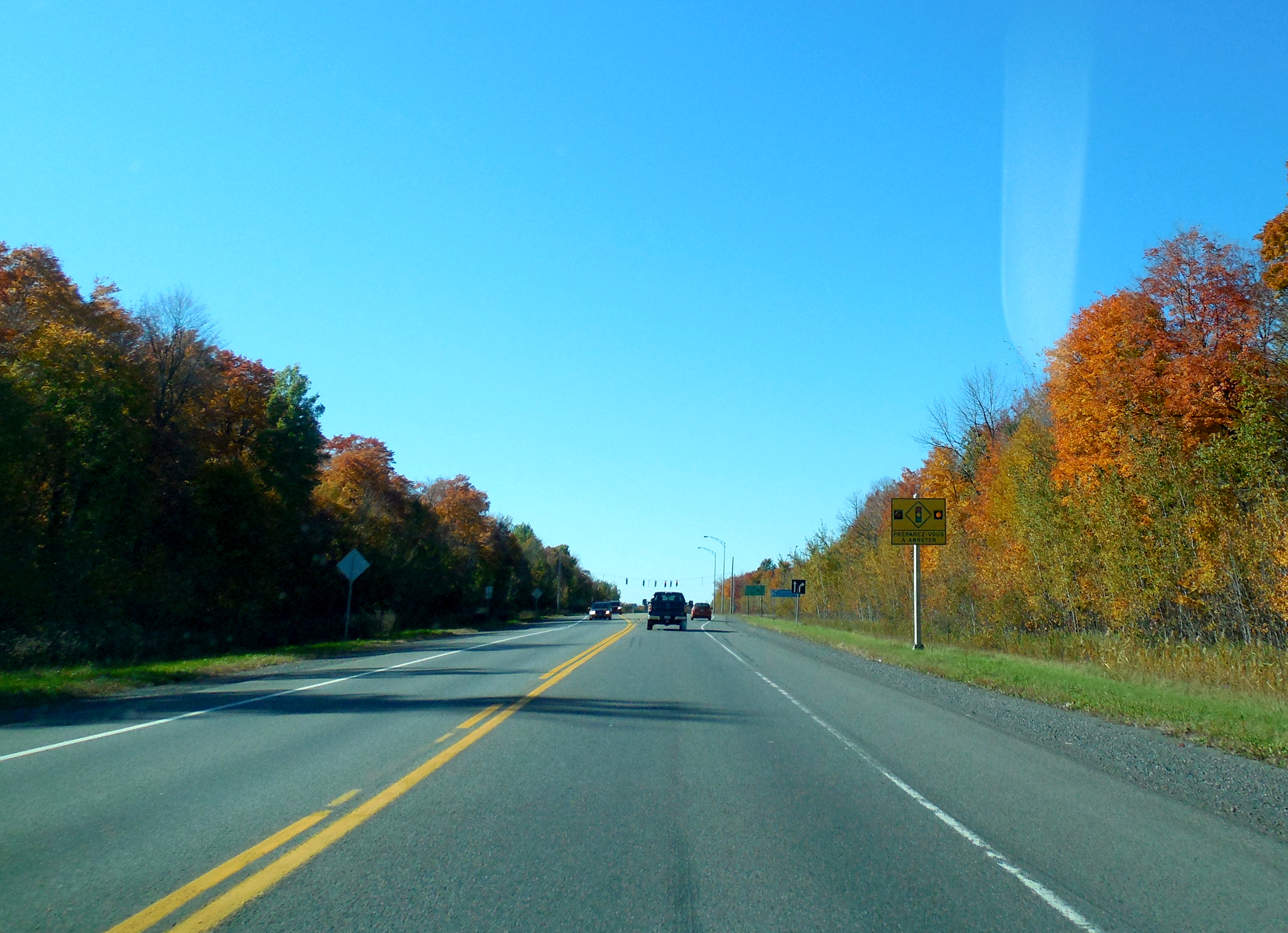
Quebec Route 158 in October 2014

== Major intersections ==
RCM	Location	km	mi	Destinations	Notes
Argenteuil	Lachute	0.0	0.0	R-148 west to R-327 – Gatineau To A-50 / Avenue Bethany	R-158 western terminus; west end of R-148 concurrency
Argenteuil	Lachute	2.1	1.3	R-329 south – Saint-Hermas	West end of R-329 concurrency
Argenteuil	Lachute	3.0	1.9	R-329 north – Gore, Morin-Heights	East end of R-329 concurrency
Mirabel		11.9	7.4	R-148 east to A-50 – Saint-Eustache	East end of R-148 concurrency
Mirabel		29.6	18.4	A-15 (TCH) – Sainte-Agathe-des-Monts, Montréal	Interchange; A-15 exit 39
La Rivière-du-Nord	Saint-Jérôme	31.7	19.7	R-117 (Boulevard Des Laurentides) – Saint-Jérôme Centre-Ville, Saint-Janvier	
Montcalm	Saint-Lin–Laurentides	53.8	33.4	R-335 south / R-337 south – Terrebonne R-339 south – Saint-Roch-de-l'Achigan	West end of R-335 / R-337 concurrency; R-339 northern terminus
Montcalm	Saint-Lin–Laurentides	55.5	34.5	R-335 north / R-337 north – Saint-Calixte	East end of R-335 / R-337 concurrency
Montcalm	Saint-Esprit	62.9	39.1	Rang de la Côte-Saint-Louis / Ancienne Route 125	Roundabout; former R-125 south
Montcalm	Saint-Esprit	63.6	39.5	A-25 south / R-125 south – Saint-Calixte	Interchange; A-25 exit 46; west end of A-25 / R-125 concurrency; A-25 north is unsigned north of R-158; R-125 is unsigned south of R-158
Montcalm	Saint-Esprit	65.7	40.8	A-25 ends / R-125 north – Sainte-Julienne, Rawdon, Saint-Donat	A-25 northern terminus; east end of A-25 / R-125 concurrency
Montcalm	Saint-Jacques	74.4	46.2	R-341 – Rawdon, Saint-Jacques	Roundabout
Joliette	Saint-Paul	86.5	53.7	R-343 – Saint-Ambroise-de-Kildare, Saint-Paul, L'Assomption	
Joliette	Joliette	89.5	55.6	Boulevard de la Base-de-Roc	Interchange
Joliette	Joliette	90.4	56.2	A-31 south / R-131 south to A-40 / Boulevard Dollard – Lavaltrie, Québec, Montréal, Joliette Centre-Ville	Interchange; A-31 exit 14; A-31 northern terminus; west end of R-131 concurrency
Joliette	Joliette	91.1	56.6	R-131 north – Notre-Dame-des-Prairies, Saint-Michel-des-Saints	East end of R-131 concurrency
D'Autray	Sainte-Geneviève-de-Berthier	111.7	69.4	R-345 north – Sainte-Elizabeth	Roundabout
D'Autray	Sainte-Geneviève-de-Berthier	114.1	70.9	R-347 north – Saint-Norbert, Saint-Cuthbert, Saint-Gabriel	
D'Autray	Berthierville	116.6	72.5	A-40 – Montréal, Trois-Rivières	Interchange; A-40 exit 144
D'Autray	Berthierville	117.8	73.2	R-138 west – Lanoraie	West end of R-138 concurrency
D'Autray	Berthierville	118.8	73.8	R-138 east – Louiseville	East end of R-138 concurrency
D'Autray	Saint-Ignace-de-Loyola	124.3	77.2	Saint-Ignace-de-Loyola ferry terminal	R-158 eastern terminus
St. Lawrence River		124.3	77.2	Ferry to Sorel-Tracy (to R-133)	
1.000 mi = 1.609 km; 1.000 km = 0.621 mi: Concurrency terminus; Tolled

== See also ==
- List of Quebec provincial highways
