= Saint-Jean-de-Matha =

- Municipality
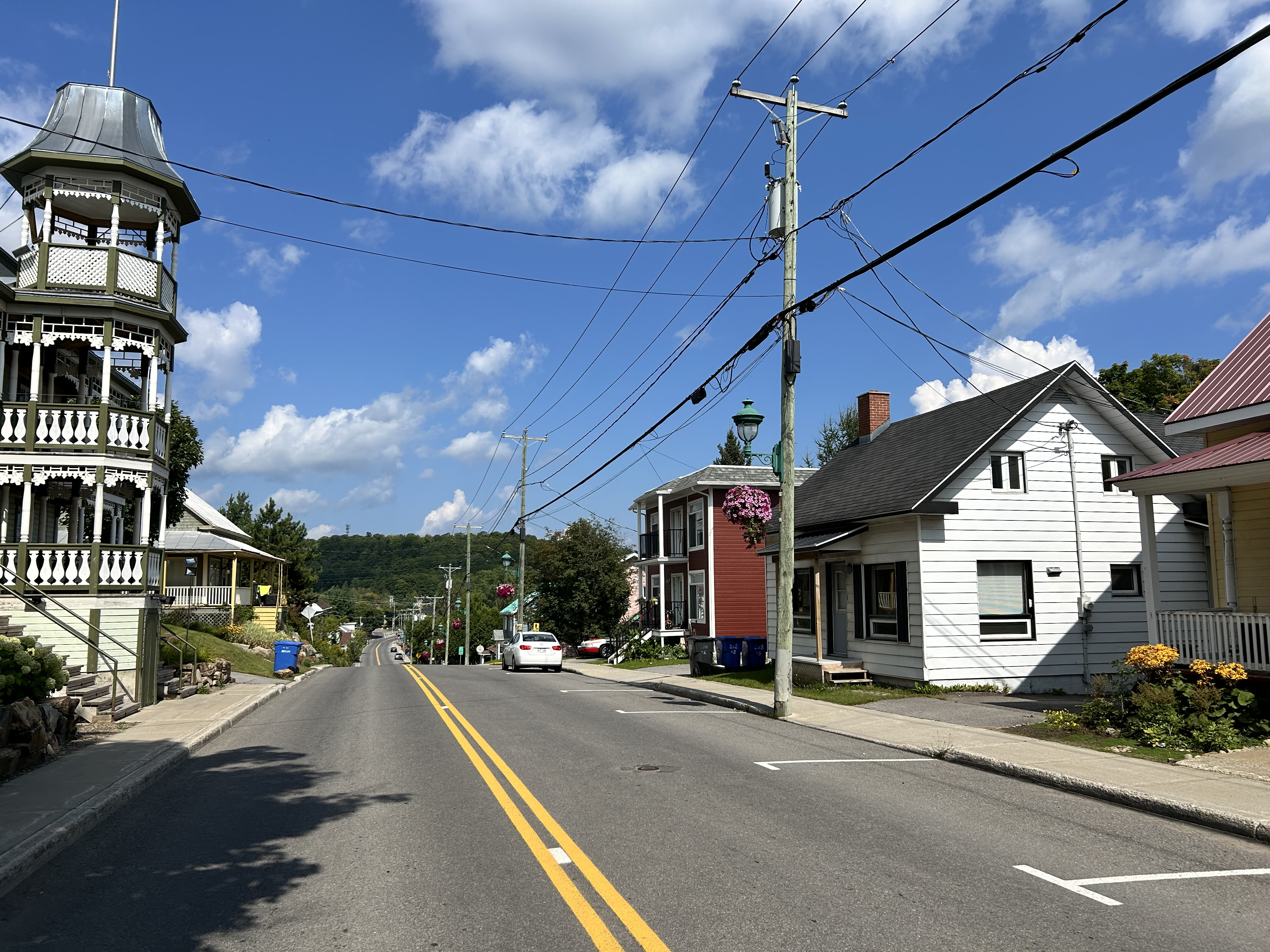
- Sainte-Louise Street in Saint-Jean-de-Matha

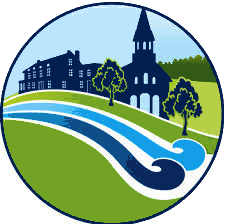
- Seal
- Nickname: Capitale de la force
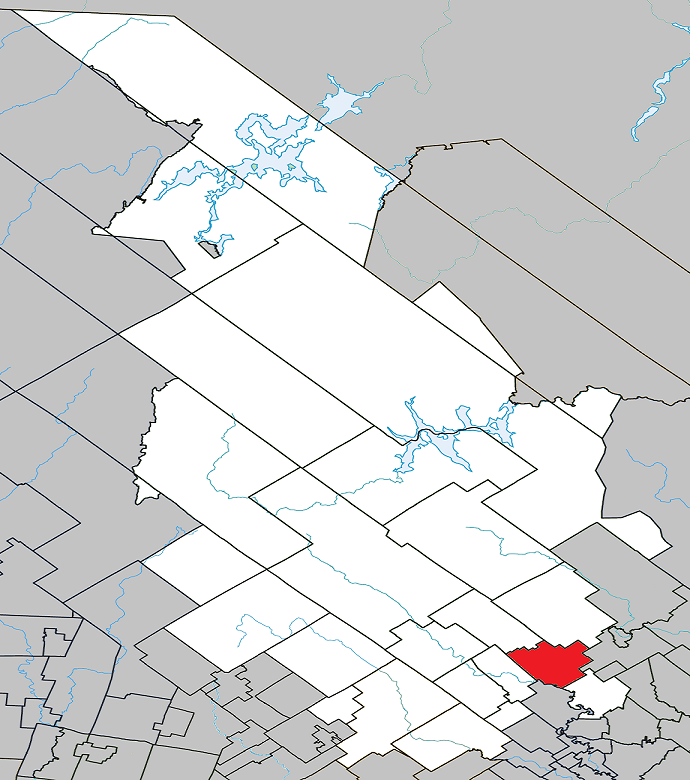
- Location within Matawinie RCM

- Location in central Quebec
- Coordinates: 46°14′N 73°32′W
- Country: Canada
- Province: Quebec
- Region: Lanaudière
- RCM: Matawinie
- Constituted: July 1, 1855

Government
  - Mayor: Sylvain Roberge
  - Federal riding: Joliette—Manawan
  - Prov. riding: Berthier

Area
  - Total: 112.90 km^{2} (43.59 sq mi)
  - Land: 109.49 km^{2} (42.27 sq mi)

Population (2021)
  - Total: 4,838
  - Density: 39.6/km^{2} (103/sq mi)
  - Pop 2016-2021: ▲8.7%
  - Dwellings: 2,851
- Time zone: UTC−5 (EST)
  - Summer (DST): UTC−4 (EDT)
- Postal code(s): J0K 2S0
- Area codes: 450 and 579
- Highways: R-131; R-337
- Website: www.municipalitestjeandematha.com

Saint-Jean-de-Matha (French pronunciation: [sɛ̃ ʒɑ̃ də mata]) is a municipality located within the Matawinie Regional County Municipality, Quebec, Canada, in the Lanaudière region.

== History ==
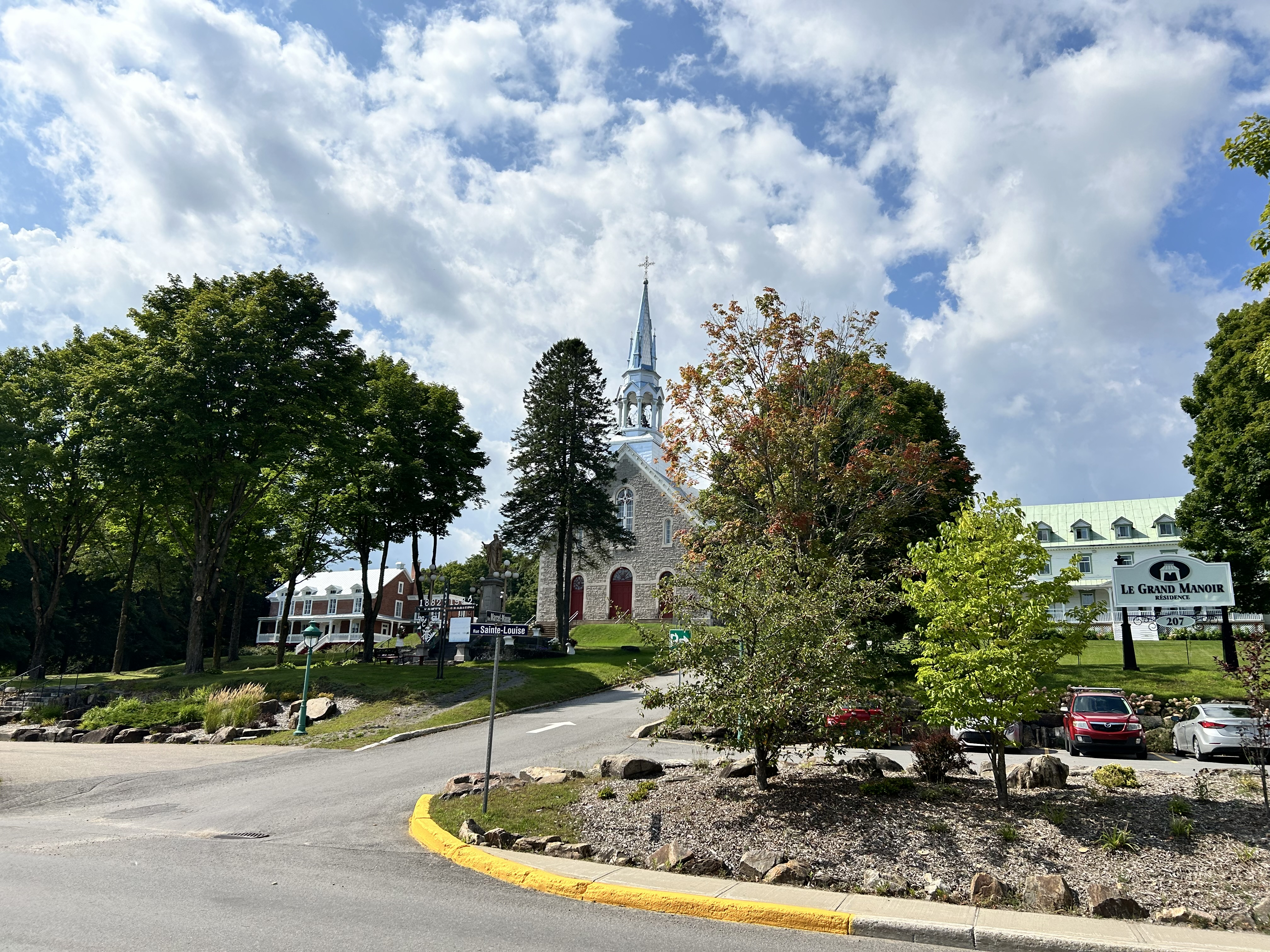

The territory was once part of the seigneurial system in the 18th century and was travelled by several coureur des bois for the fur industry as well as workers in the logging industry as it was located nearby rich forest lands of the Laurentians and the Haute Mauricie regions near the Saint-Maurice River.

In the 1850s that the Saint-Jean-de-Matha Parish was made a municipality in 1855. While development was at first slow in the 19th century, the population grew rapidly as settlers arrived in Quebec or moved away from the regions closer to the Saint Lawrence River as part of measures to develop new lands across the province.

== Demographics ==
=== Population ===
Historical Census Data - Saint-Jean-de-Matha, Quebec
Year	Pop.	±%
1861	1,346	—
1871	2,293	+70.4%
1881	2,133	−7.0%
1891	2,675	+25.4%
1901	1,958	−26.8%
1911	1,958	+0.0%
1921	1,800	−8.1%
1931	1,428	−20.7%
1941	1,713	+20.0%
1951	1,744	+1.8%
1956	1,673	−4.1%
1961	1,709	+2.2%
1966	1,712	+0.2%
1971	1,842	+7.6%
1976	2,031	+10.3%
1981	2,515	+23.8%
1986	2,926	+16.3%
1991	3,260	+11.4%
1996	3,624	+11.2%
2001	3,602	−0.6%
2006	4,152	+15.3%
2011	4,335	+4.4%
2016	4,450	+2.7%
2021	4,838	+8.7%

Private dwellings occupied by usual residents: 2,259 (total dwellings: 2,851)

=== Language ===
Mother tongue:

- English as first language: 1.2%
- French as first language: 96.9%
- English and French as first language: 0.5%
- Other as first language: 1.2%

== Transportation ==
The main transportation link of the municipality is Route 131 which travels throughout much of the Lanaudière region from Saint-Michel-des-Saints southward towards Joliette and Lavaltrie in which it connects Autoroute 40 towards Montreal, Quebec City and Ottawa-Gatineau. Secondary Route 337 travels through more western towns of the Lanaudière region towards the northern Montreal suburbs of Terrebonne and Mascouche located along Autoroute 25 just north of the east end of Laval.

Railway service also exists since the late 19th century part of a Canada-wide development initiated by the first Canadian Prime Minister John A. Macdonald which help develop several small industries despite frequent departures by several locales towards the United States in the late 19th century.

== Education ==
The Commission scolaire des Samares operates francophone public schools:

- École Bernèche

The Sir Wilfrid Laurier School Board operates anglophone public schools, including:

- Joliette Elementary School in Saint-Charles-Borromée
- Joliette High School in Joliette

== See also ==
- List of municipalities in Quebec
