= Quebec Route 131 =

Highway in Quebec, Canada

Coordinates: 46.0292°N 73.4079°W

Route 131

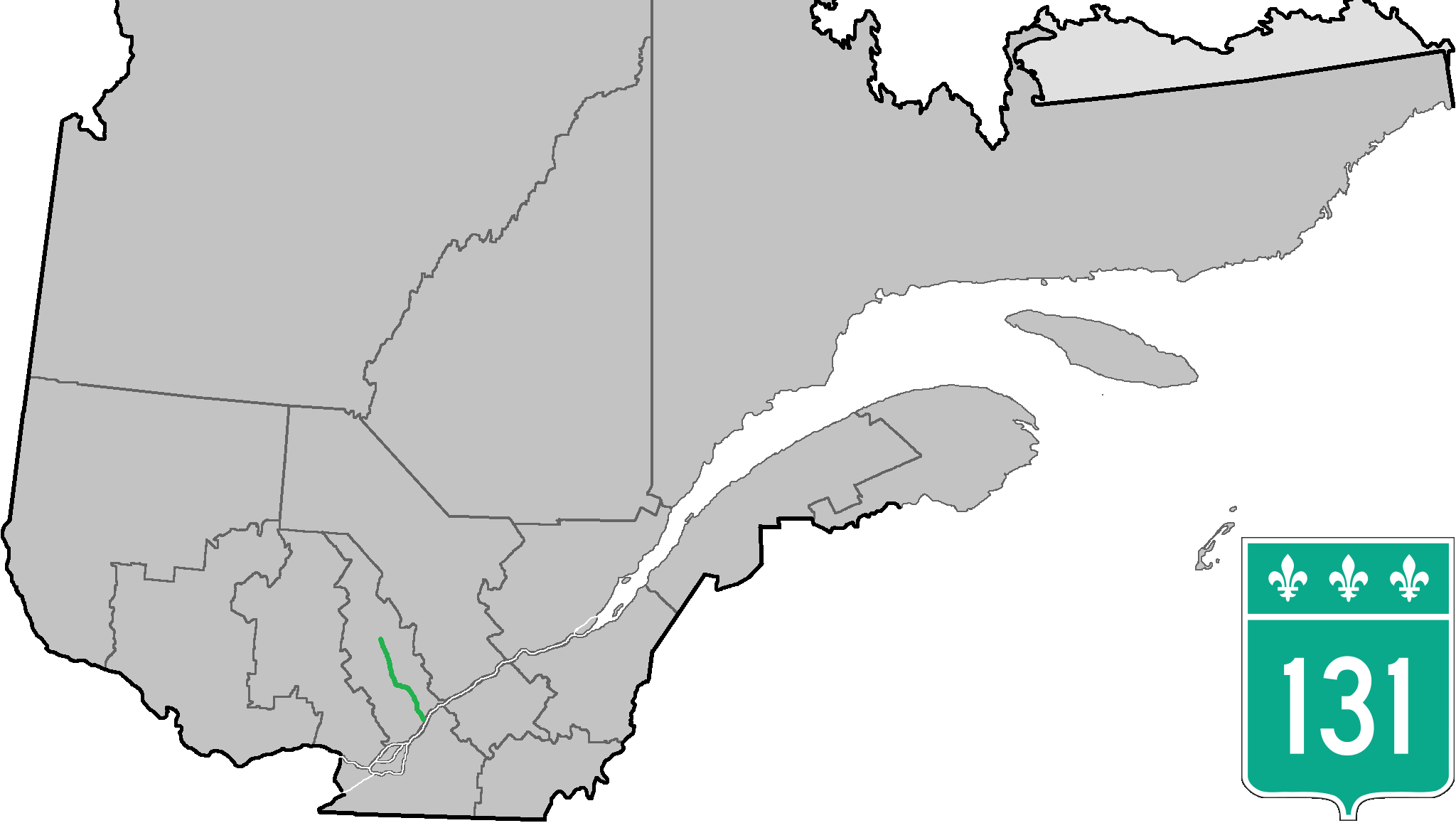

Route information
- Maintained by Transports Québec
- Length: 125.2 km (77.8 mi)
- History: Route 43 (Sainte-Émélie-de-l'Énergie – Saint-Michel-des-Saints); Route 48 (Joliette – Sainte-Émélie-de-l'Énergie)

Major junctions
- South end: R-138 in Lavaltrie
- A-31 / A-40 in Lavaltrie; A-31 / R-158 in Joliette
- North end: Chemin de Saint-Ignace in Saint-Michel-des-Saints

Location
- Country: Canada
- Province: Quebec

Highway system
- Quebec provincial highways; Autoroutes; List; Former
← R-125	→ R-132

Route 131 is a Quebec highway running from Lavaltrie (junction of Route 138) to Saint-Michel-des-Saints in Lanaudière. This route, combined with Autoroute 31, provides the key route to Joliette, and then continues northward through Saint-Félix-de-Valois, Saint-Jean-de-Matha and Saint-Zénon for a distance of approximately 125 kilometres (78 mi).

== Municipalities along Route 131 ==
- Lavaltrie
- Joliette
- Notre-Dame-des-Prairies
- Notre-Dame-de-Lourdes
- Saint-Félix-de-Valois
- Saint-Jean-de-Matha
- Sainte-Émélie-de-l'Énergie
- Saint-Zénon
- Saint-Michel-des-Saints

== Major intersections ==
RCM	Location	km	mi	Destinations	Notes
D'Autray	Lavaltrie	0.0	0.0	R-138 – Repentigny, Lanoraie, Berthierville	R-131 southern terminus
D'Autray	Lavaltrie	2.4	1.5	A-40 / A-31 begins – Montréal, Québec	A-31 southern terminus; south end of A-31 concurrency; A-31 exit 1; A-40 exit 122
See Quebec Autoroute 31 § Exit list
Joliette	Joliette	19.1	11.9	R-158 west – Saint-Jérôme A-31 ends / Boulevard Dollard – Joliette Centre-Ville	A-31 northern terminus; north end of A-31 concurrency; A-31 exit 14; south end of R-158 concurrency
Joliette	Joliette	19.9	12.4	R-158 east (Chemin des Prairies) – Berthierville	North end of R-158 concurrency
Joliette	Joliette	22.1	13.7	Boulevard Firestone	
Joliette	Notre-Dame-des-Prairies	23.2	14.4	Boulevard Antonio-Barrette	
Matawinie	Saint-Félix-de-Valois	36.7	22.8	R-345 south – Sainte-Elizabeth	
Matawinie	Saint-Félix-de-Valois	39.8	24.7	R-348 west – Rawdon	South end of R-348 concurrency
Matawinie	Saint-Félix-de-Valois	40.7	25.3	R-348 east – Saint-Gabriel-de-Brandon	North end of R-348 concurrency
Matawinie	Saint-Jean-de-Matha	48.3	30.0	R-337 south – Sainte-Béatrix, Saint-Alphonse-Rodriguez	
Matawinie	Sainte-Émélie-de-l'Énergie	57.7	35.9	R-347 south – Saint-Damien	South end of R-347 concurrency
Matawinie	Sainte-Émélie-de-l'Énergie	64.9	40.3	R-347 north – Saint-Côme	North end of R-347 concurrency
Matawinie	Saint-Michel-des-Saints	125.2	77.8	Chemin Saint-Ignace	R-131 northern terminus
1.000 mi = 1.609 km; 1.000 km = 0.621 mi: Concurrency terminus

== In other media ==
The route is name-dropped in the opening lyrics of the song "Le Shack à Hector" by Repentigny-based neo-trad band Les Cowboys Fringants.

== See also ==
- List of Quebec provincial highways
