= Centre de services scolaire des Samares =

The Centre de services scolaire des Samares is a francophone school district headquartered in Saint-Félix-de-Valois, in the Canadian province of Quebec. It comprises several primary schools and high schools across municipalities in the Lanaudière region. The commission is overseen by a board of elected school trustees.

== History ==
Created in 1998 by the merger of Commission scolaire de l'Industrie, Des Cascades-l'Achigan, Berthier-Nord-Joli, and by the annexation of part of the territory of the Commission scolaire de Le Gardeur (Lavaltrie).

== List of schools ==
Name	Location	City	Type	Year built	Year enlarged	Elevator
Au Gré-des-Vents (Notre-Dame-de-la-Merci)	1936, route 125	Notre-Dame-de-la-Merci	Primary	1949		No
Au Gré-des-Vents (Saint-Émile)	2500, chem. d'Entrelacs	Entrelacs	Primary	1951		No
Barthélemy-Joliette	345, rue Sir-Mathias-Tellier S	Joliette	Secondary	1962	1969	No
Bermon	1919, 6e Rang	Saint-Gabriel-de-Brandon	Secondary	1976		No
Bernèche	239, rue du Collège	Saint-Jean-de-Matha	Primary	1959		No
Bérard	90, rue du Collège	Saint-Zénon	Primary	1960		No
Centre d'excellence en santé de Lanaudière	110, rue Marie-Curie	Saint-Charles-Borromée	Adult education	2017		Yes
Centre de formation de Berthier	881, rue Pierre-de-Lestage	Berthierville	Vocational training	1969	2002	No
Centre de formation de l'Argile	918, rue Ladouceur	Joliette	Vocational training	1996	1998, 2000	No
Centre de formation de l'Envol	1270, rue Ladouceur	Joliette	Vocational training	1969		No
Centre de formation de Lavaltrie	551, rue Notre-Dame, suite 120	Lavaltrie	Vocational training	1940s		No
Centre de formation de Manawan	111, rue Kicik	Manawan	Vocational training			No
Centre de formation de Montcalm	621, rue J.-Oswald-Forest	Saint-Roch-de-l'Achigan	Vocational training	2023		No
Centre de formation de Rawdon	3461, rue Queen	Rawdon	Vocational training	1973	1975	No
Centre de formation de Saint-Gabriel	130, rue Dequoy	Saint-Gabriel-de-Brandon	Vocational training	1960s		No
Centre de formation des adultes en francisation de Joliette	455, boul. Base-de-Roc	Joliette	Adult education	1930		No
Centre de formation en santé de Saint-Esprit	40, rue des Écoles	Saint-Esprit	Vocational training	1954		No
De l'Achigan	60, mnt. Rémi-Henri	Saint-Roch-de-l'Achigan	Secondary	1972	1990	No
De l'Ami-Soleil	501, rue Adèle-Deschênes	Sainte-Émélie-de-l'Énergie	Primary	1960		No
De l'Aubier	250, chem. Saint-Stanislas	Saint-Lin–Laurentides	Primary	1998	2013	Yes
De l'Espace-Jeunesse	90, boul. des Mésanges	Saint-Charles-Borromée	Specialist	2015		No
De l'Intervalle	1170, rue Ladouceur	Joliette	Secondary	1975		No
De l'Orée-des-Bois	411, rang Pied-de-la-Montagne	Sainte-Marcelline-de-Kildare	Primary	1957, 2025		No
De l'Érablière	5211, rue Principale	Saint-Félix-de-Valois	Secondary	1972		No
De l'Île Saint-Ignace	133, rue de l'École	Saint-Ignace-de-Loyola	Primary	2019		No
De la Passerelle (Notre-Dame-du-Sacré-Coeur)	33, boul. Brassard	Saint-Paul	Primary	1958	1969, 2007	No
De la Passerelle (Vert-Demain)	157, rue des Tourelles	Saint-Paul	Primary	2014		Yes
De la Rive	60, rue Douaire-de-Bondy	Lavatrie	Secondary	1997		Yes
De la Récolte	20, rue Beaudry	Saint-Jacques	Primary	1953		No
De la Source	1020, rue du Tricentenaire	Lavaltrie	Primary	1994		Yes
De la Source d'Autray	31, chem. Joliette	Lanoraie	Primary	1952	1983, 2024	No
De Saint-Alphonse	505, rue du Clocher-du-Lac	Saint-Alphonse-Rodriguez	Primary	1961		No
De Saint-Calixte (De la Gentiane)	100, rue Marie-Fournier	Saint-Calixte	Primary	1997	2022	Yes
De Saint-Calixte (Louis-Joseph-Martel)	6315, rue de l'Hôtel-de-Ville	Saint-Calixte	Primary	1956		No
De Saint-Côme	1611, 55e Rue	Saint-Côme	Primary	1958		No
De Saint-Théodore-de-Chertsey	423, chem. de l'Église	Chertsey	Primary	1955	1993	No
De Sainte-Marie-Salomé	141, rue Viger	Sainte-Marie-Salomé	Primary	1961		No
Des Amis-Soleils	1351, rue du Tricentenaire	Lavaltrie	Primary	1984		Yes
Des Boutons-d'Or	2370, route 337	Sainte-Julienne	Primary	1984		Yes
Des Brise-Vent	760, rue Principale	Saint-Thomas	Primary	1955	1989	No
Des Cascades (Saint-Louis)	3763, rue Albert	Rawdon	Primary	2019		Yes
Des Cascades (Sainte-Anne)	3790, chem. du Lac Morgan	Rawdon	Primary	1958	1990	No
Des Chutes	3144, 18e Av.	Rawdon	Secondary	1976	1992	Yes
Des Eaux-Vives	30, mnt. Guy-Mousseau	Lavaltrie	Primary	1998		Yes
Des Grands-Vents (De l'Envolée)	35, rue Dequoy	Saint-Gabriel-de-Brandon	Primary	1954, 2027		No
Des Grands-Vents (Des Rafales)	59, rue Champagne	Saint-Gabriel-de-Brandon	Primary	1949, 2027		No
Des Grands-Vents (Des Tourbillons)	50, rue des Écoles	Saint-Gabriel-de-Brandon	Primary	1961, 2027		No
Des Montagnes	290, rue Brassard	Saint-Michel-des-Saints	Secondary	1978		No
Des Moulins (Notre-Dame)	70, rue Sainte-Marguerite	Saint-Félix-de-Valois	Primary	1960		No
Des Moulins (Sainte-Marguerite)	71, rue Sainte-Marguerite	Saint-Félix-de-Valois	Primary	1958		No
Des Mésanges (Christ-Roi)	228, rue Bordeleau	Joliette	Primary	1949		No
Des Mésanges (Sainte-Marie)	574, boul. Sainte-Anne	Joliette	Primary	1956	1960s	No
Des Prairies (Des Sentiers)	100, 3e Av.	Notre-Dame-des-Prairies	Primary	2023		No
Des Prairies (Dominique-Savio)	189, rue Jetté	Notre-Dame-des-Prairies	Primary	1964		No
Des Prairies (Mgr-Jetté)	153, rue Jetté	Notre-Dame-des-Prairies	Primary	1962		No
Des Quatre-Temps (Marie-Charlotte)	981, rue Notre-Dame	Joliette	Primary	1947		No
Des Quatre-Temps (Rose-des-Vents)	273, rue Richard	Joliette	Primary	1956		No
Des Quatre-Temps (Saint-Pierre)	940, rue de Lanaudière	Joliette	Primary	1951		No
Des Quatre-Temps (Wilfrid-Gervais)	945, rue Notre-Dame	Joliette	Primary	1966		No
Des Trois-Temps (De l'Arc-en-Ciel)	263, 14e Av.	Saint-Lin–Laurentides	Primary	1932	1994	No
Des Trois-Temps (De l'Oiseau-Bleu)	670, rue Archambault	Saint-Lin–Laurentides	Primary	1985		Yes
Des Trois-Temps (Sir-Wilfrid-Laurier)	265, 16e Av.	Saint-Lin–Laurentides	Primary	1963	1980	No
Des Virevents	2385, rue du Domaine-Malo	Sainte-Julienne	Primary	2017		Yes
Dominique-Savio	39, rue des Écoles	Saint-Esprit	Primary	1952	2000	No
Du Carrefour-des-Lacs	145, côte Saint-Ambroise	Saint-Lin–Laurentides	Primary	1993		Yes
Du Chemin-du-Roy (Maternelle Sainte-Geneviève)	780, rue Saint-Viateur	Berthierville	Primary	1967		No
Du Chemin-du-Roy (Saint-Joseph)	770, rue Saint-Viateur	Berthierville	Primary	1962		No
Du Chemin-du-Roy (Sainte-Geneviève)	761, rue Saint-Viateur	Berthierville	Primary	1963		No
Du Havre-Jeunesse	2175, rue du Domaine-Malo	Sainte-Julienne	Secondary	1995		Yes
Du Ruisseau	646, av. Villeneuve	Saint-Lin–Laurentides	Primary	2018		Yes
Dusablé	601, rue Dusablé	Saint-Barthélemy	Primary	1950	1980s	No
Emmélie-Caron	2420, rue Principale	Sainte-Élisabeth	Primary	1956		No
Germain-Caron	490, rue Principale	Saint-Didace	Primary	1951		No
Jean-Chrysostôme-Chaussé	41, rue Saint-Antoine N	Lavaltrie	Primary	1954	1971	No
Lorenzo-Gauthier (Du Préambule)	50, rue Pierre-de-Coubertin	Saint-Charles-Borromée	Primary	2019		Yes
Lorenzo-Gauthier (Vers l'Avenir)	100, rue Deschênes	Saint-Charles-Borromée	Primary	1968		No
Mgr J.-A.-Papineau	485, rue Laval	Joliette	Primary	1960		No
New school		Joliette	Primary	2027		
New school		Saint-Charles-Borromée	Primary	2026		
New school		Saint-Lin–Laurentides	Primary	2026		
Notre-Dame	225, rue Principale	Saint-Alexis	Primary	1950		No
Notre-Dame	20, rue Vézina	Saint-Roch-de-l'Achigan	Primary	1960	2013, 2017, 2025	No
Notre-Dame-de-la-Paix	961, rue des Commissaires	Saint-Ambroise-de-Kildare	Primary	1958	1969, 1987	No
Panet	891, rue de l'Église	Sainte-Béatrix	Primary	1960	2004	No
Pierre-de-Lestage	881, rue Pierre-de-Lestage	Berthierville	Secondary	1969	2002	No
Sacré-Coeur-de-Jésus	141, 8e Rue	Crabtree	Primary	1929	1958, 1981	No
Saint-Coeur-de-Marie	6960, rue Principale	Saint-Damien	Primary	1963		No
Saint-Jean-Baptiste	380, rue Brassard	Saint-Michel-des-Saints	Primary	1960		No
Saint-Joseph	740, rue Principale	Saint-Liguori	Primary	1965		No
Saint-Louis-de-France	4, rue du Collège	Saint-Jacques	Primary	1961		No
Sainte-Anne	1950, rue Principale	Saint-Cuthbert	Primary	1961		No
Sainte-Anne	2130, rue Principale	Saint-Norbert	Primary	1956		No
Sainte-Bernadette	3961, rue Principale	Notre-Dame-de-Lourdes	Primary	1956	1986, 2026	No
Sainte-Hélène	100, rue de l'Église	Sainte-Mélanie	Primary	1958	1989	No
Sainte-Thérèse	305, rue Calixa-Lavallée	Joliette	Primary	1952		No
Service aux entreprises	110, rue Marie-Curie	Saint-Charles-Borromée	Adult education	2017		Yes
Thérèse-Martin	916, rue Ladouceur	Joliette	Secondary	1964	1969, 1996	No
Youville	275, rue Desjardins	Mandeville	Primary	1956		No
À l'Unisson (Des Explorateurs)	2747, rue Adolphe	Sainte-Julienne	Primary	1999		Yes
À l'Unisson (Notre-Dame-de-Fatima)	2463, rue Victoria	Sainte-Julienne	Primary	1953	1970s	No
École hôtelière de Lanaudière	355, rue Sir-Mathias-Tellier S	Joliette	Vocational training	1966		No

== See also ==
- Sir Wilfrid Laurier School Board - English school board which covers the same territory
