= Saint-Félix-de-Valois =

- Municipality
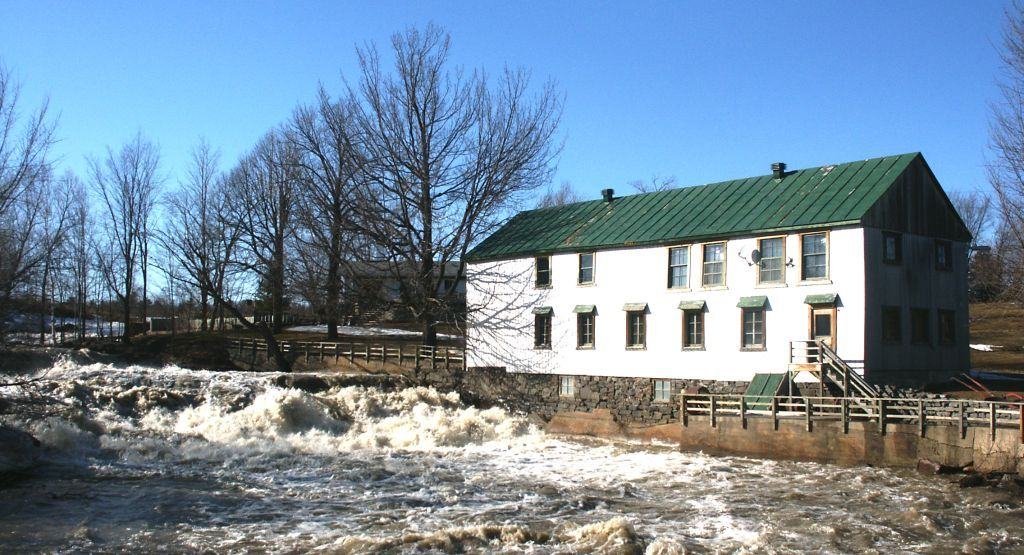
- The Emery Mill on the Bayonne River

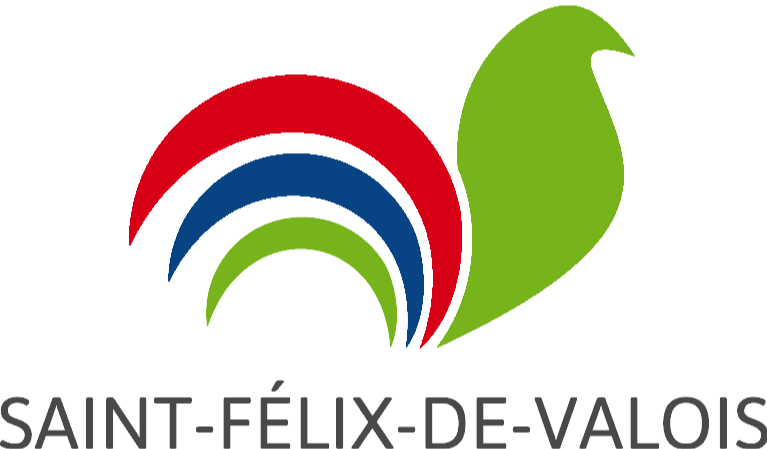
- Seal

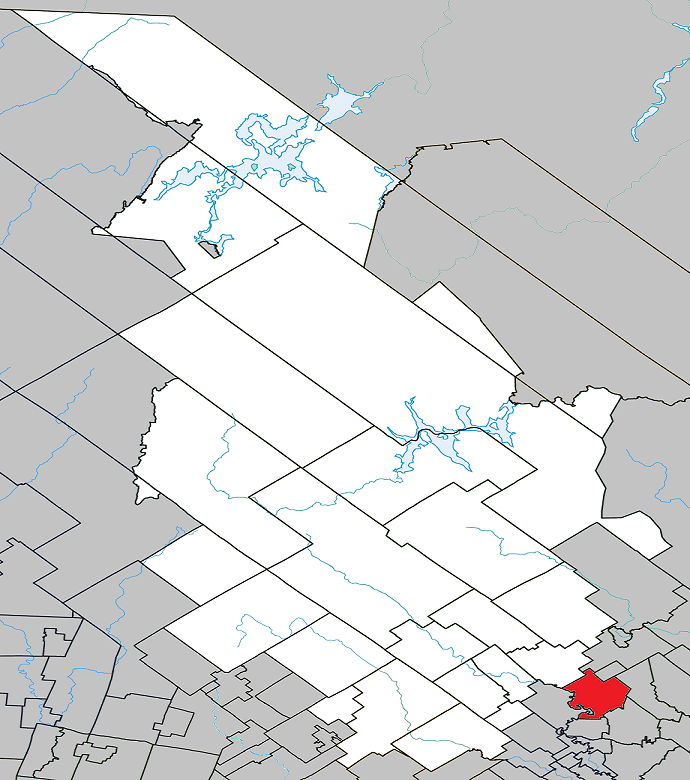
- Location within Matawinie RCM

- Location in central Quebec
- Coordinates: 46°10′N 73°26′W
- Country: Canada
- Province: Quebec
- Region: Lanaudière
- RCM: Matawinie
- Settled: c. 1830
- Constituted: December 24, 1997

Government
  - Mayor: Audrey Boisjoly
  - Federal riding: Joliette—Manawan
  - Prov. riding: Berthier

Area
  - Total: 89.80 km^{2} (34.67 sq mi)
  - Land: 88.40 km^{2} (34.13 sq mi)

Population (2021)
  - Total: 6,975
  - Density: 78.9/km^{2} (204/sq mi)
  - Pop 2016-2021: ▲10.6%
  - Dwellings: 3,190
- Time zone: UTC−5 (EST)
  - Summer (DST): UTC−4 (EDT)
- Postal code(s): J0K 2M0
- Area codes: 450 and 579
- Highways: R-131; R-348
- Website: www.st-felix-de-valois.com

Saint-Félix-de-Valois (French pronunciation: [sɛ̃ feliks də valwa]) is a municipality in the Lanaudière region of Quebec, Canada, part of the Matawinie Regional County Municipality.

Quebec author Réjean Ducharme, recipient of several Governor General's Awards, was born in Saint-Félix-de-Valois in 1942.

== History ==
Historically it was part of the Berthier Seignory. Circa 1830, a small group of pioneers from England, Scotland, and Ireland started to colonize the place. In 1840, the Mission of Saint-Félix-de-Valois was formed and soon after in 1844 it became a parish when it separated from the Sainte-Élisabeth Parish. It was named after Felix of Valois.

In 1845, the Parish Municipality of Saint-Félix-de-Valois was first established, but abolished two years later. In 1851, its post office opened. In 1855, the parish municipality was reestablished.

In 1926, the main village, also known as Saint-Félix-de-Valois, was incorporated as a separate Village Municipality. On December 24, 1997, the parish municipality and the village municipality were reunited into the new Municipality of Saint-Félix-de-Valois.

== Demographics ==
=== Population ===
Historical Census Data - Saint-Félix-de-Valois, Quebec
Year	Pop.	±%
2001	5,465	—
2006	5,755	+5.3%
2011	6,029	+4.8%
2016	6,305	+4.6%
2021	6,975	+10.6%

Private dwellings occupied by usual residents: 3057 (total dwellings: 3190)

=== Language ===
Mother tongue:

- English as first language: 0.9%
- French as first language: 97.5%
- English and French as first language: 0.6%
- Other as first language: 1%

== Education ==
Commission scolaire des Samares is the French school board.

- École secondaire de l'Érablière
- École des Moulins (Saint-Félix-de-Valois)
  - pavillon Notre-Dame
  - pavillon Sainte-Marguerite

Sir Wilfrid Laurier School Board serves as the English school board.

- Joliette Elementary School in Saint-Charles-Borromée
- Joliette High School in Joliette

== Notable people ==
- Peter B. Champagne, American businessman and politician
- Michel Vaillancourt, silver medalist at the 1976 Olympics in equestrian

== See also ==
- List of municipalities in Quebec
