= Lavaltrie =

- City
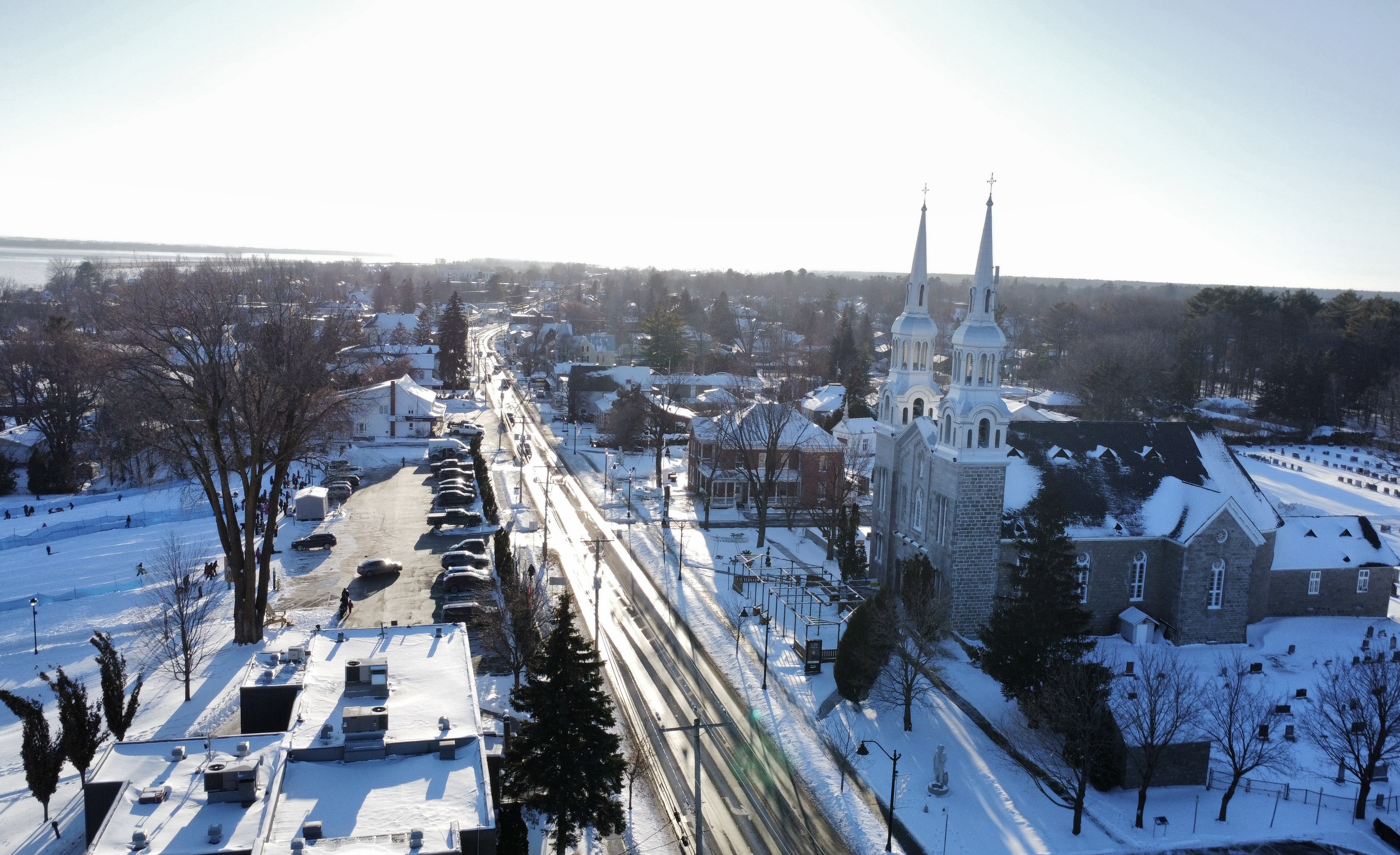
- Aerial view of Lavaltrie

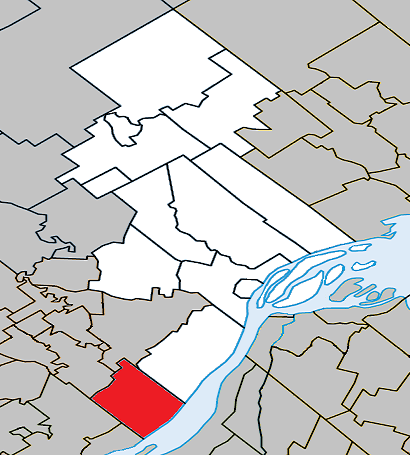
- Location within D'Autray RCM

- Location in central Quebec
- Coordinates: 45°53′N 73°17′W
- Country: Canada
- Province: Quebec
- Region: Lanaudière
- RCM: D'Autray
- Settled: 1675
- Constituted: May 16, 2001

Government
  - Mayor: Christian Goulet
  - Fed. riding: Berthier—Maskinongé
  - Prov. riding: L'Assomption

Area
  - Total: 79.45 km^{2} (30.68 sq mi)
  - Land: 68.22 km^{2} (26.34 sq mi)
  - Urban: 7.03 km^{2} (2.71 sq mi)

Population (2021)
  - Total: 14,425
  - Density: 211.4/km^{2} (548/sq mi)
  - Urban: 11,301
  - Urban density: 1,607.7/km^{2} (4,164/sq mi)
  - Change 2016-21: ▲5.6%
  - Dwellings: 5,973
- Time zone: UTC−5 (EST)
  - Summer (DST): UTC−4 (EDT)
- Postal code(s): J5T
- Area codes: 450, 579
- Highways A-31 A-40: R-131; R-138
- Website: www.ville.lavaltrie.qc.ca

Lavaltrie (French pronunciation: [lavaltʁi]) is a city located within the D'Autray Regional County Municipality in the southern part of the region of Lanaudière, Quebec, Canada, northeast of Montreal outside the suburban sprawl of the North Shore (i.e., the suburbs located north of Laval). The population was 14,425 as of the 2021 Canadian census within a land surface area of about 70 square kilometres, with the majority of the territory being used for agricultural activities. .

== History ==
The origins of Lavaltrie go back to the 17th century. Jean Talon, the intendant of New France, gave parcels of land (known as manors) to various lords. The land where Lavaltrie is now situated was given to Lieutenant Sieur la Valtrie by Talon in 1672. By 1675, its first settlers arrived. In the 18th century, land occupants built a new roadway along the St. Lawrence River linking Montreal and Quebec City, named the Chemin Du Roy and now known as Quebec Route 138. For many decades, Lavaltrie was located in the centre of a large series of manors owned by lords intended to develop the agricultural sector.

In 1716, the Parish of Saint-Antoine de La Valtrie was formed, named after Anthony of Padua by Recollect friars.

In 1845, the Parish Municipality of Lavaltrie was created, abolished in 1847, and reestablished in 1855 under the name Saint-Antoine de la Valtrie (orthography adjusted to Saint-Antoine-de-Lavaltrie in 1969). In 1926, the village itself separated from the parish municipality to become the Village Municipality of Lavaltrie.

Mostly a rural area until the second half of the 20th century, Lavaltrie developed steadily due to the growing suburbs of Montreal.

On May 16, 2001, the Parish Municipality of Saint-Antoine-de-Lavaltrie and the Village Municipality of Lavaltrie was amalgamated to form the City of Lavaltrie.

== Demographics ==
In the 2021 Census of Population conducted by Statistics Canada, Lavaltrie had a population of 14,425 living in 5,838 of its 5,973 total private dwellings, a change of 5.6% from its 2016 population of 13,657. With a land area of 68.22 km^{2} (26.34 sq mi), it had a population density of 211.4/km^{2} (547.6/sq mi) in 2021.

Historical census populations – Lavaltrie
Year	Pop.	±%
2001	11,163	—
2006	12,120	+8.6%
2011	13,267	+9.5%
2016	13,657	+2.9%
2021	14,425	+5.6%
Source: Statistics Canada

Historical census populations – Saint-Antoine-de-Lavaltrie (parish)

Year	Pop.	±%
1871	1,312	—
1881	1,314	+0.2%
1891	987	−24.9%
1901	998	+1.1%
1911	969	−2.9%
1921	949	−2.1%
1931	688	−27.5%

Year	Pop.	±%
1941	692	+0.6%
1951	847	+22.4%
1956	861	+1.7%
1961	942	+9.4%
1966	1,064	+13.0%
1971	1,202	+13.0%
1976	1,590	+32.3%

Year	Pop.	±%
1981	2,422	+52.3%
1986	2,630	+8.6%
1991	3,061	+16.4%
1996	4,385	+43.3%
2001	5,196	+18.5%

Population counts are not adjusted for boundary changes.
Source: Statistics Canada

Historical census populations – Lavaltrie (village)

Year	Pop.	±%
1931	308	—
1941	415	+34.7%
1951	661	+59.3%
1956	917	+38.7%
1961	1,034	+12.8%

Year	Pop.	±%
1966	1,189	+15.0%
1971	1,261	+6.1%
1976	1,473	+16.8%
1981	2,053	+39.4%
1986	2,690	+31.0%

Year	Pop.	±%
1991	4,365	+62.3%
1996	5,821	+33.4%
2001	5,967	+2.5%

Source: Statistics Canada

== Government ==
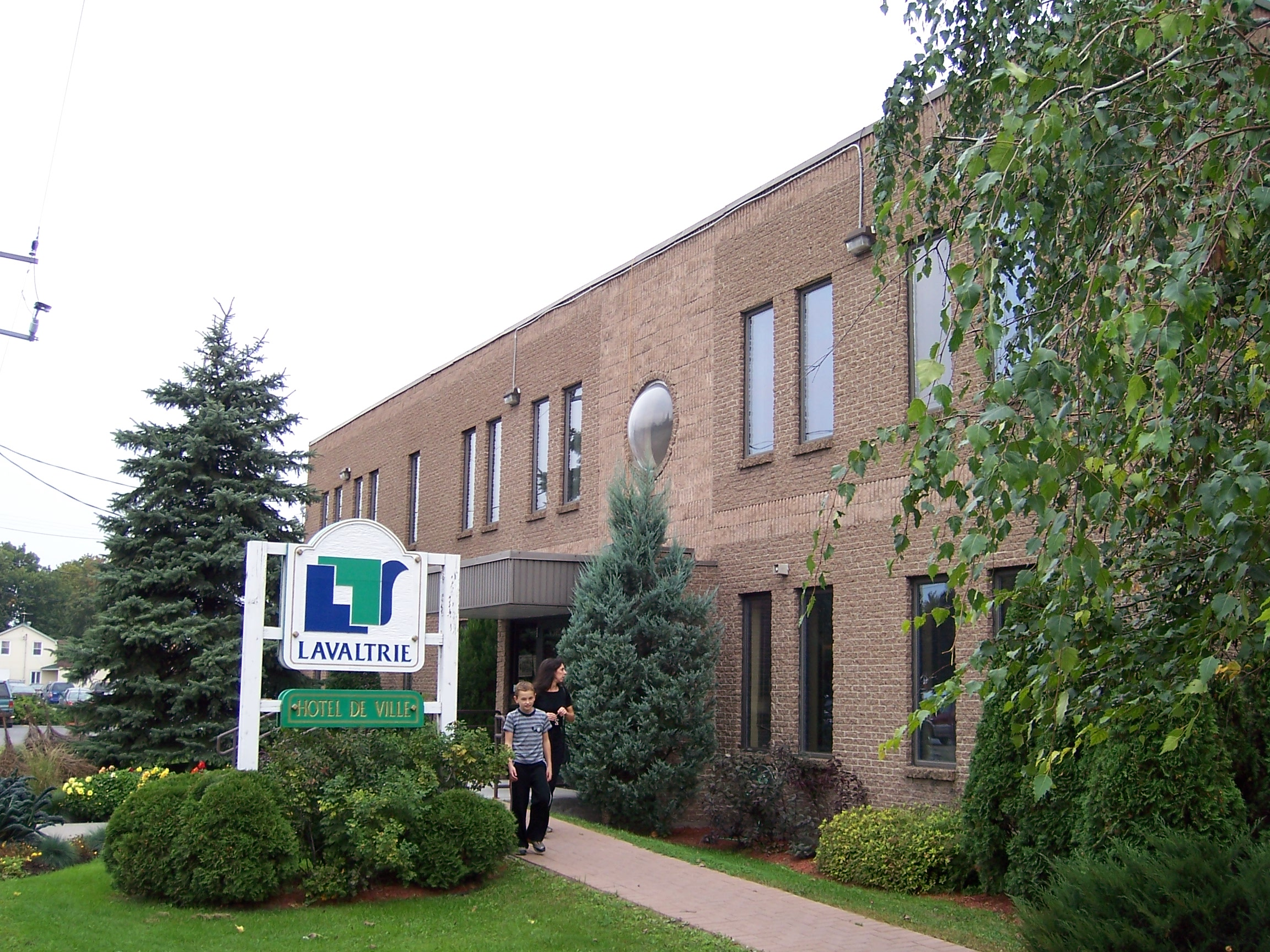
City Hall

List of former mayors of current city:

- Sylvie Thouin (2001–2005)
- Norman Blackburn (2005–2009)
- Jean-Claude Gravel (2009–2017)
- Christian Goulet (2017–present)

== Infrastructure ==
Lavaltrie's location near Autoroute 40 and Route 138 gives easy access to Montreal, Laval and the northern crown area of the Greater Montreal area. A-40 also gives Lavaltrie direct links to Trois-Rivières and Quebec City to the east and Ottawa to the west. Autoroute 31 and Route 131 which ends at the junction of the A-40 in Lavaltrie gives the area easy access to more remote and rural regions of the Lanaudière region. However, even though located beside the Saint Lawrence River on its north, the city does not have a direct access to the south with the closest links being Autoroute 25 via the Louis-Hippolyte Lafontaine Tunnel in Montreal to the west or the Berthierville-Sorel ferry to the east (Autoroute 55 in Trois-Rivières via the Laviolette Bridge being the closest roadway link to its east).

== Education ==
Commission scolaire des Samares operates francophone public schools:

- École primaire de la Source
- École primaire des Eaux-Vives
- École primaire Jean-Chrysostôme-Chaussé
- École primaire des Amis-Soleils
- École Secondaire de la Rive

The Sir Wilfrid Laurier School Board operates anglophone public schools, including:

- Joliette Elementary School in Saint-Charles-Borromée
- Joliette High School in Joliette

== See also ==
- Télesphore Saint-Pierre
- List of municipalities in Quebec
