= Notre-Dame-des-Prairies =

- City
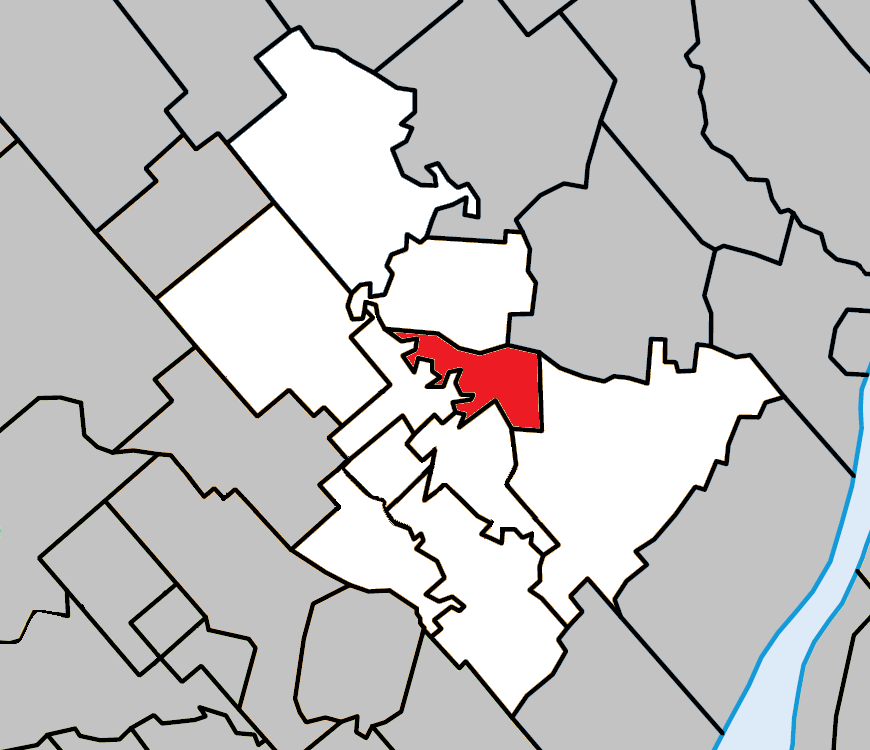
- Location within Joliette RCM.

- Location in central Quebec.
- Coordinates: 46°03′N 73°26′W
- Country: Canada
- Province: Quebec
- Region: Lanaudière
- RCM: Joliette
- Constituted: January 1, 1957

Government
  - Mayor: Suzanne Dauphin
  - Federal riding: Joliette
  - Prov. riding: Joliette

Area
  - Total: 18.80 km^{2} (7.26 sq mi)
  - Land: 18.20 km^{2} (7.03 sq mi)

Population (2016)
  - Total: 9,273
  - Density: 509.4/km^{2} (1,319/sq mi)
  - Pop 2011-2016: ▲4.6%
  - Dwellings: 4,396
- Time zone: UTC−5 (EST)
  - Summer (DST): UTC−4 (EDT)
- Postal code(s): J6E
- Area codes: 450 and 579
- Highways: R-131
- Website: www.notre-dame-des-prairies.org

Notre-Dame-des-Prairies (French pronunciation: [nɔtʁə dam de pʁɛʁi]) is a town in the Lanaudière region of Quebec, Canada, part of the Joliette Regional County Municipality. It is a suburb of Joliette, located along the eastern shores of the L'Assomption River.

== History ==
In 1950, the Parish of Notre-Dame-des-Prairies was established. The name refers to the prairies or planes of the Saint-Lawrence Lowlands that characterize the landscape. In 1957, the municipality was formed by separating from the Parish Municipality of Saint-Charles-Borromée-du-Village-d'Industrie. In 2005, the municipality changed statutes and became the City of Notre-Dame-des-Prairies.

== Demographics ==
In the 2021 Census of Population conducted by Statistics Canada, Notre-Dame-des-Prairies had a population of 9,471 living in 4,446 of its 4,547 total private dwellings, a change of 2.1% from its 2016 population of 9,273. With a land area of 18.1 km^{2} (7.0 sq mi), it had a population density of 523.3/km^{2} (1,355.2/sq mi) in 2021.

Population trend:

- Population in 2016: 9273 (2011 to 2016 population change: 4.6%)
- Population in 2011: 8868 (2006 to 2011 population change: 7.8%)
- Population in 2006: 8230
- Population in 2001: 7316
- Population in 1996: 6837
- Population in 1991: 6465

Mother tongue:

- English as first language: 0.6%
- French as first language: 97.6%
- English and French as first language: 0%
- Other as first language: 1.8%

== Education ==
Commission scolaire des Samares operates francophone public schools, including:

- École des Prairies
  - pavillon Dominique-Savio
  - pavillon Monseigneur-Jetté

The Sir Wilfrid Laurier School Board operates anglophone public schools, including:

- Joliette Elementary School in Saint-Charles-Borromée
- Joliette High School in Joliette

== Notable people ==
- Dominique Ducharme - former head coach of the Montreal Canadiens
- A.J. Greer - ice hockey player

== See also ==
- List of cities in Quebec
