= Joliette Regional County Municipality =

Joliette
- Regional county municipality
- Coordinates: 46°01′N 73°27′W
- Country: Canada
- Province: Quebec
- Region: Lanaudière
- Effective: January 1, 1982
- County seat: Joliette

Government
  - Type: Prefecture
  - Prefect: André Hénault

Area
  - Total: 424.20 km^{2} (163.78 sq mi)
  - Land: 417.41 km^{2} (161.16 sq mi)

Population (2021)
  - Total: 71,124
  - Density: 170.4/km^{2} (441/sq mi)
  - Change 2016-2021: ▲6.9%
  - Dwellings: 33,812
- Time zone: UTC−5 (EST)
  - Summer (DST): UTC−4 (EDT)
- Area codes: 450 and 579
- Website: www.mrcjoliette.qc.ca

Joliette (French pronunciation: [ʒɔljɛt]) is a regional county municipality in the Lanaudière region of Quebec, Canada. Its seat is Joliette.

The municipality has a land area of 417.41 km^{2} (161.16 sq mi). At the 2021 census it had a population of 71,124.

== Subdivisions ==
There are 10 subdivisions within the RCM:

Cities & towns (4)

- Crabtree
- Joliette
- Notre-Dame-des-Prairies
- Saint-Charles-Borromée

Municipalities (5)

- Notre-Dame-de-Lourdes
- Saint-Ambroise-de-Kildare
- Sainte-Mélanie
- Saint-Paul
- Saint-Thomas

Villages (1)

- Saint-Pierre

== Transportation ==
=== Access routes ===
Highways and numbered routes that run through the municipality, including external routes that start or finish at the county border:

- Autoroutes
  - A-31
- Principal highways
  - R-131
  - R-158
- Secondary highways
  - R-343
  - R-346
  - R-348
- External routes
  - None

== See also ==
- List of regional county municipalities and equivalent territories in Quebec
