= Saint-Zénon =

- Municipality
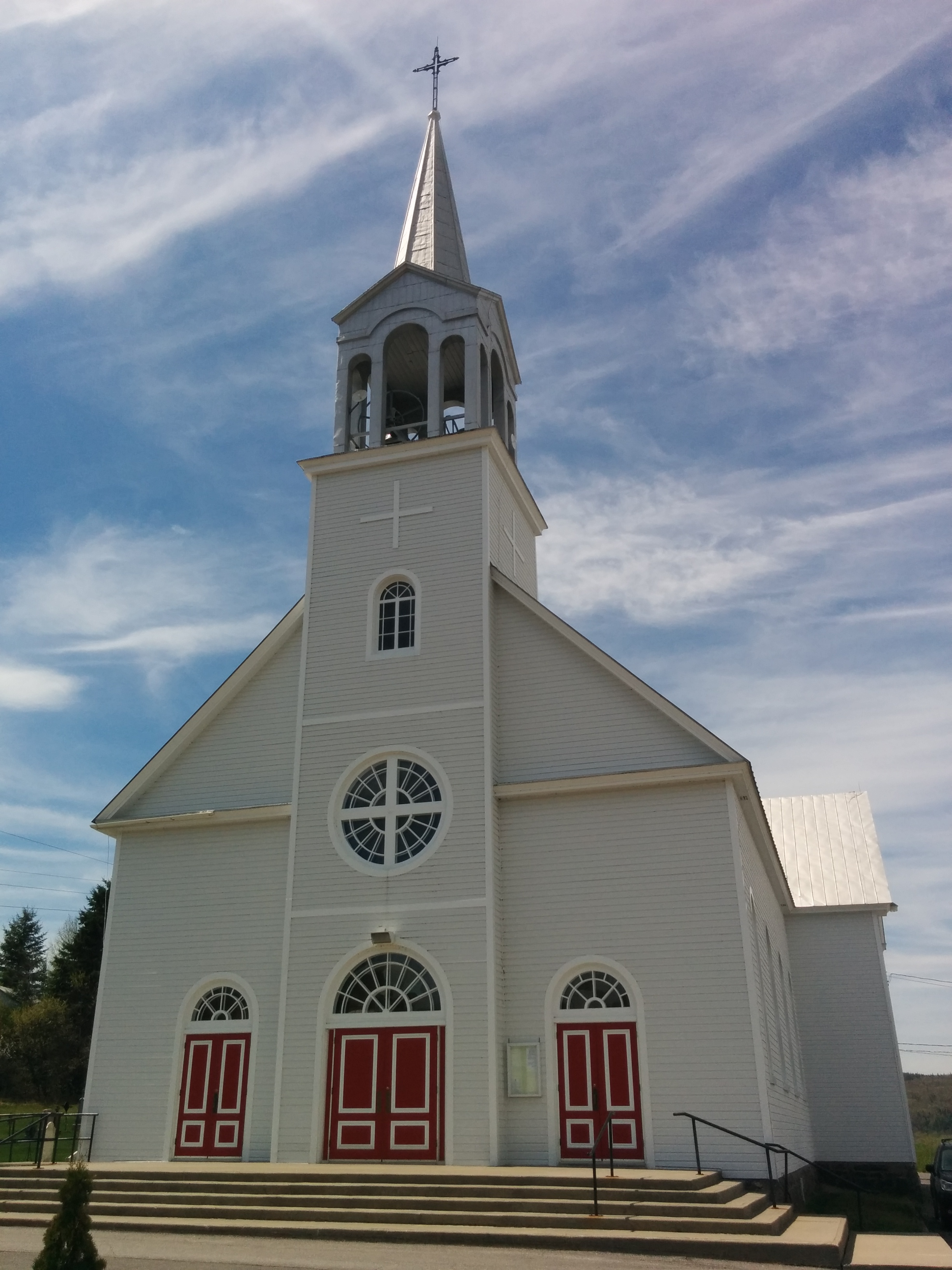

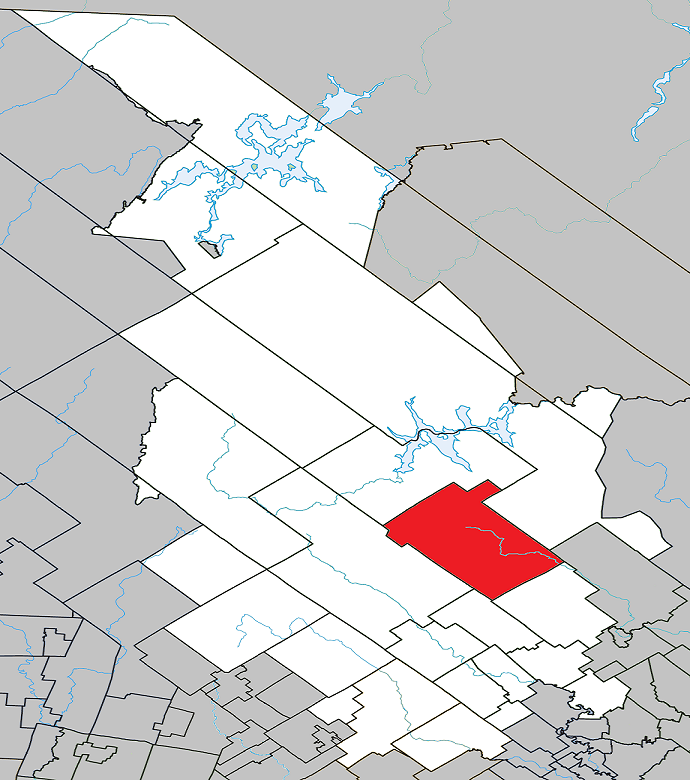
- Location within Matawinie RCM.

- Location in central Quebec.
- Coordinates: 46°33′N 73°49′W
- Country: Canada
- Province: Quebec
- Region: Lanaudière
- RCM: Matawinie
- Constituted: October 7, 1895
- Named for: Zeno of Verona

Government
  - Mayor: Karl Lacouvée
  - Federal riding: Joliette—Manawan
  - Prov. riding: Berthier

Area
  - Total: 492.20 km^{2} (190.04 sq mi)
  - Land: 460.41 km^{2} (177.77 sq mi)

Population (2021)
  - Total: 1,317
  - Density: 2.9/km^{2} (7.5/sq mi)
  - Pop 2016-2021: ▲17.6%
  - Dwellings: 1,347
- Time zone: UTC−5 (EST)
  - Summer (DST): UTC−4 (EDT)
- Postal code(s): J0K 3N0
- Area codes: 450 and 579
- Highways: R-131
- Website: www.st-zenon.org

Saint-Zénon (French pronunciation: [sɛ̃ zenɔ̃]) is a municipality in the Lanaudière region of Quebec, part of the Matawinie Regional County Municipality.

== History ==
Saint-Zénon was founded in 1895 by Théophile-Stanislas Provost.

== Demographics ==
=== Population ===
In the 2021 Census, Statistics Canada reported that Saint-Zénon had a population of 1,317 living in 721 of its 1,357 total dwellings, an 17.6% change from its 2016 population of 1,120. With a land area of 460.41 km^{2} (177.77 sq mi), it had a population density of 2.8605/km^{2} (7.4086/sq mi) in 2021.

Historical Census Data - Saint-Zénon, Quebec

Year	Pop.	±%
1901	510	—
1911	594	+16.5%
1921	867	+46.0%
1931	822	−5.2%
1941	1,000	+21.7%
1951	1,179	+17.9%
1956	1,169	−0.8%

Year	Pop.	±%
1961	1,173	+0.3%
1966	988	−15.8%
1971	814	−17.6%
1976	775	−4.8%
1981	853	+10.1%
1986	882	+3.4%
1991	1,067	+21.0%

Year	Pop.	±%
1996	1,146	+7.4%
2001	1,180	+3.0%
2006	1,379	+16.9%
2011	1,250	−9.4%
2016	1,120	−10.4%
2021	1,317	+17.6%

=== Language ===
Mother tongue:

- English as first language: 1.5%
- French as first language: 94.3%
- English and French as first language: 0.8%
- Other as first language: 2.7%

== Education ==
Commission scolaire des Samares operates francophone public schools:

- École Bérard

The Sir Wilfrid Laurier School Board operates anglophone public schools serving the community at the secondary level, including:

- Joliette High School in Joliette

== See also ==
- List of municipalities in Quebec
