= Sainte-Élisabeth, Quebec =

Sainte-Élisabeth
- Municipality
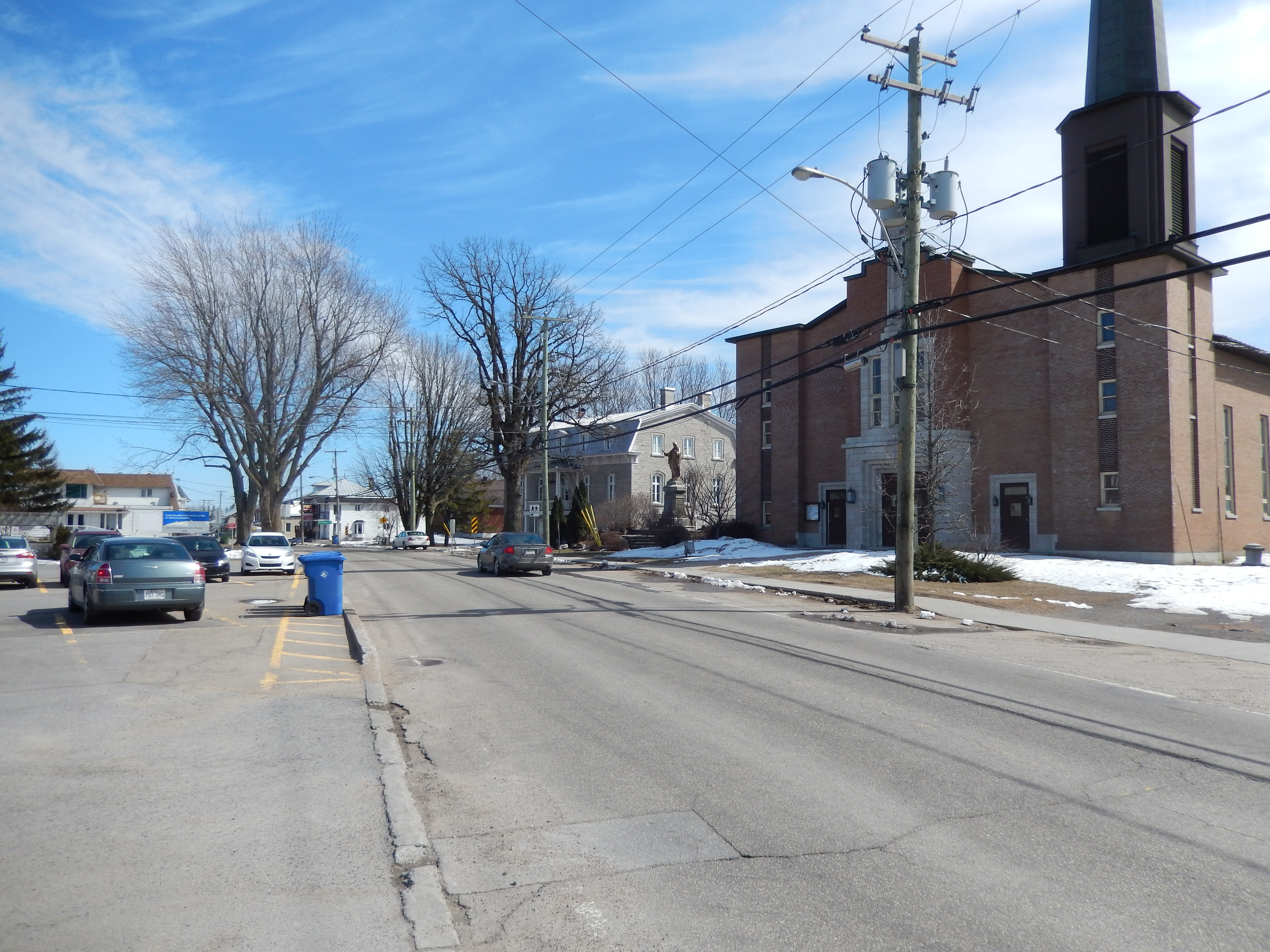

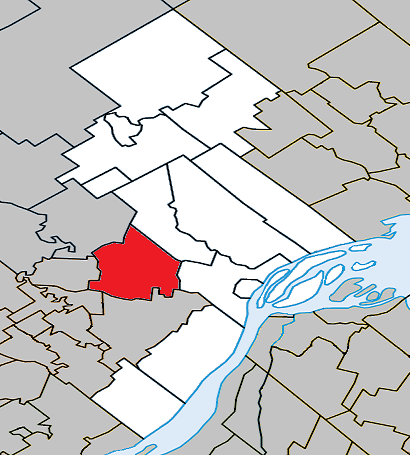
- Location within D'Autray RCM

- Location in central Quebec
- Coordinates: 46°05′N 73°21′W
- Country: Canada
- Province: Quebec
- Region: Lanaudière
- RCM: D'Autray
- Constituted: July 1, 1855

Government
  - Mayor: Pierre Savignac
  - Fed. riding: Berthier—Maskinongé
  - Prov. riding: Berthier

Area
  - Total: 82.92 km^{2} (32.02 sq mi)
  - Land: 83.00 km^{2} (32.05 sq mi)
- There is an apparent discrepancy between 2 authoritative sources.

Population (2021)
  - Total: 1,390
  - Density: 16.7/km^{2} (43/sq mi)
  - Change 2016-21: ▼4.7%
  - Dwellings: 628
- Time zone: UTC−5 (EST)
  - Summer (DST): UTC−4 (EDT)
- Postal code(s): J0K 2J0
- Area codes: 450, 579
- Highways: R-345
- Website: www.ste-elisabeth.qc.ca

Sainte-Élisabeth (French pronunciation: [sɛ̃t elizabɛt]) is a municipality in the Lanaudière region of Quebec, Canada, part of the D'Autray Regional County Municipality.

== History ==
The first settlers came to the area in 1756, and a mission was established by 1799. In 1834, the Parish of Sainte-Elizabeth was formed, and two years later its post office opened. In 1845, the Parish Municipality of Sainte-Elizabeth was created, abolished in 1847, and reestablished in 1855 as a regular municipality.

On March 15, 1969, it changed statutes to become a parish municipality, which was reverted again to a regular municipality on January 19, 2013.

== Demographics ==
Historical census populations – Sainte-Élisabeth, Quebec

Year	Pop.	±%
1871	2,753	—
1881	2,980	+8.2%
1891	2,725	−8.6%
1901	2,696	−1.1%
1911	2,372	−12.0%
1921	2,276	−4.0%
1931	1,742	−23.5%
1941	1,722	−1.1%

Year	Pop.	±%
1951	1,614	−6.3%
1956	1,678	+4.0%
1961	1,716	+2.3%
1966	1,618	−5.7%
1971	1,633	+0.9%
1976	1,601	−2.0%
1981	1,650	+3.1%
1986	1,543	−6.5%

Year	Pop.	±%
1991	1,508	−2.3%
1996	1,559	+3.4%
2001	1,474	−5.5%
2006	1,440	−2.3%
2011	1,559	+8.3%
2016	1,459	−6.4%
2021	1,390	−4.7%

Population counts are not adjusted for boundary changes.
Source: Statistics Canada

Private dwellings occupied by usual residents (2021): 605 (total dwellings: 628)

Mother tongue (2021):

- English as first language: 0.7%
- French as first language: 97.5%
- English and French as first languages: 0.7%
- Other as first language: 1.1%

== Education ==
Commission scolaire des Samares operates francophone public schools, including:

- École Emmélie-Caron

The Sir Wilfrid Laurier School Board operates anglophone public schools, including:

- Joliette Elementary School in Saint-Charles-Borromée
- Joliette High School in Joliette

== See also ==
- List of municipalities in Quebec
