= D'Autray Regional County Municipality =

D'Autray
- Regional county municipality
- Coordinates: 46°10′N 73°10′W
- Country: Canada
- Province: Quebec
- Region: Lanaudière
- Effective: January 1, 1982
- County seat: Berthierville

Government
  - Type: Prefecture
  - Prefect: Gaétan Gravel

Area
  - Total: 1,352.00 km^{2} (522.01 sq mi)
  - Land: 1,249.30 km^{2} (482.36 sq mi)

Population (2016)
  - Total: 42,189
  - Density: 33.8/km^{2} (88/sq mi)
  - Change 2011-2016: ▲1.3%
  - Dwellings: 20,768
- Time zone: UTC−5 (EST)
  - Summer (DST): UTC−4 (EDT)
- Area codes: 450 and 579
- Website: www.mrcautray.com

D'Autray (French pronunciation: [dotʁɛ]) is a regional county municipality in the Lanaudière region of Quebec, Canada. Its seat is Berthierville.

The municipality has a land area of 1,249.30 km^{2} (482.36 sq mi) and its population was 42,189 inhabitants as of the 2016 Census. Its largest community is the city of Lavaltrie.

== Subdivisions ==
There are 15 subdivisions within the RCM:

Cities & towns (3)

- Berthierville
- Lavaltrie
- Saint-Gabriel

Municipalities (9)

- La Visitation-de-l'Île-Dupas
- Lanoraie
- Mandeville
- Saint-Cléophas-de-Brandon
- Saint-Cuthbert
- Saint-Gabriel-de-Brandon
- Saint-Ignace-de-Loyola
- Sainte-Élisabeth
- Sainte-Geneviève-de-Berthier

Parishes (3)

- Saint-Barthélemy
- Saint-Didace
- Saint-Norbert

== Demographics ==
=== Population ===
Canada census – D'Autray community profile

	2021	2016	2011
Population	44,080 (+4.5% from 2016)	42,189 (+1.3% from 2011)	41,650 (+3.3% from 2006)
Land area	1,234.67 km^{2} (476.71 sq mi)	1,249.3 km^{2} (482.4 sq mi)	1,247.55 km^{2} (481.68 sq mi)
Population density	35.7/km^{2} (92/sq mi)	33.8/km^{2} (88/sq mi)	33.4/km^{2} (87/sq mi)
Median age	47.6 (M: 46.8, F: 48.0)	47.0 (M: 46.4, F: 47.5)	45.1 (M: 44.5, F: 45.6)
Private dwellings	21,395 (total) 19,555 (occupied)	20,768 (total)	19,924 (total)
Median household income	$67,000	$55,057	$49,313

References: 2021 2016 2011

Historical census data - D'Autray Regional County Municipality, Quebec

Year	Pop.	±%
1991	32,979	—
1996	37,553	+13.9%
2001	38,347	+2.1%
2001A	38,431	+0.2%

Year	Pop.	±%
2006	40,321	+4.9%
2011	41,650	+3.3%
2016	42,189	+1.3%

(A) adjusted figure due to boundary change.

=== Language ===
Canada Census mother tongue - D'Autray Regional County Municipality, Quebec
Census	Total	French			English			French & English			Other		
Year	Responses	Count	Trend	Pop %	Count	Trend	Pop %	Count	Trend	Pop %	Count	Trend	Pop %
2016	41,705	40,525	▲0.9%	97.2%	415	▼2.4%	1.0%	175	▼5.4%	0.4%	590	▲45.7%	1.4%
2011	41,190	40,175	▲4.1%	97.5%	425	▼12.4%	1.0%	185	▲131.2%	0.5%	405	▼36.2%	1.0%
2006	39,800	38,600	▲5.6%	96.98%	485	▼2.0%	1.22%	80	▼56.8%	0.20%	635	▲81.4%	1.60%
2001	37,585	36,555	▲1.0%	97.26%	495	▲76.8%	1.32%	185	▲37.0%	0.49%	350	▲62.8%	0.93%
1996	36,840	36,210	n/a	98.29%	280	n/a	0.76%	135	n/a	0.37%	215	n/a	0.58%

== Transportation ==
=== Access routes ===
Highways and numbered routes that run through the municipality, including external routes that start or finish at the county border:

- Autoroutes
  - A-31
  - A-40
- Principal highways
  - R-131
  - R-138
  - R-158
- Secondary highways
  - R-345
  - R-347
  - R-348
- External routes
  - None

== See also ==
- List of regional county municipalities and equivalent territories in Quebec
