= Saint-Charles-Borromée =

- City
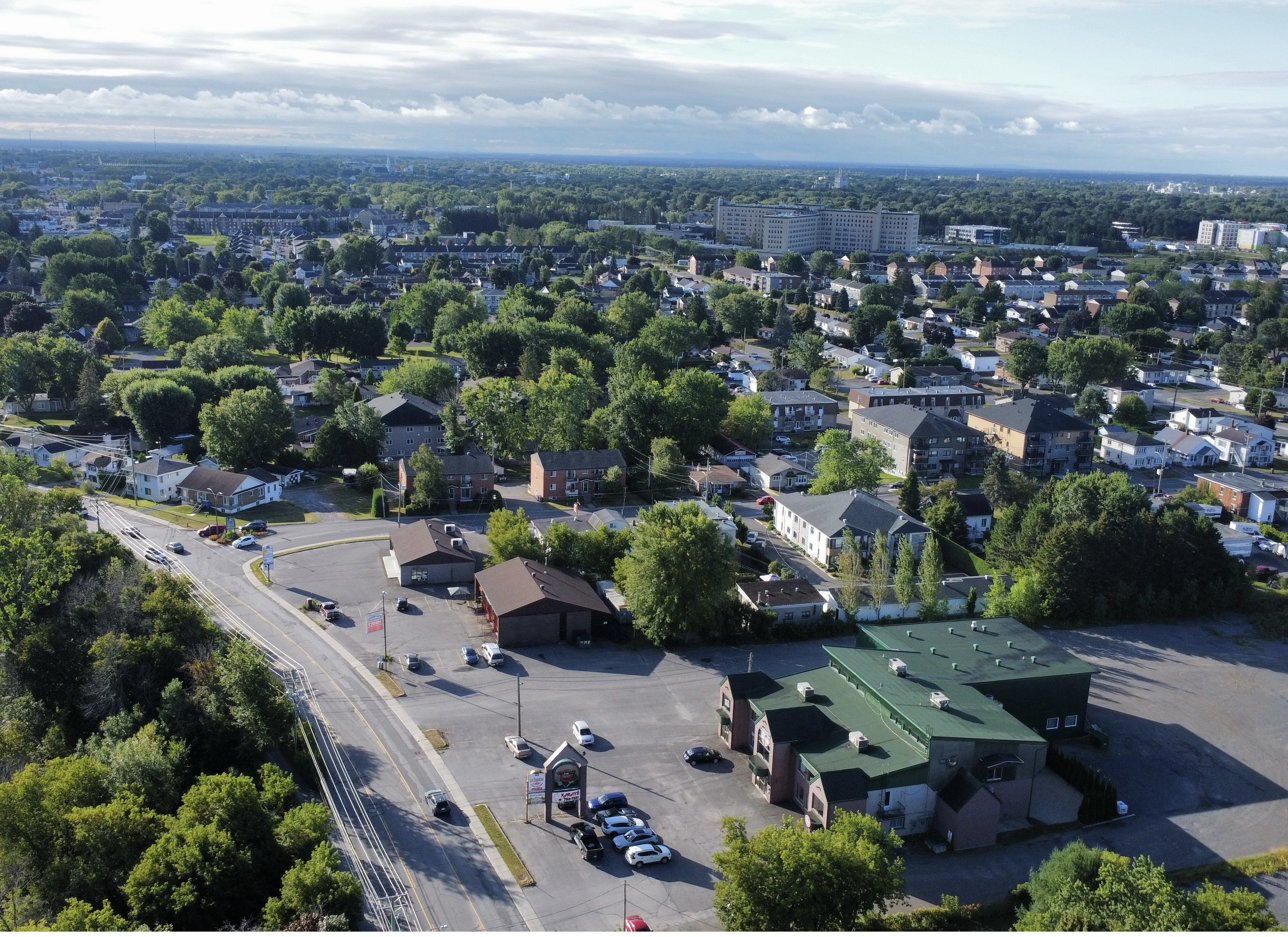
- Aerial view of Saint-Charles-Borromée

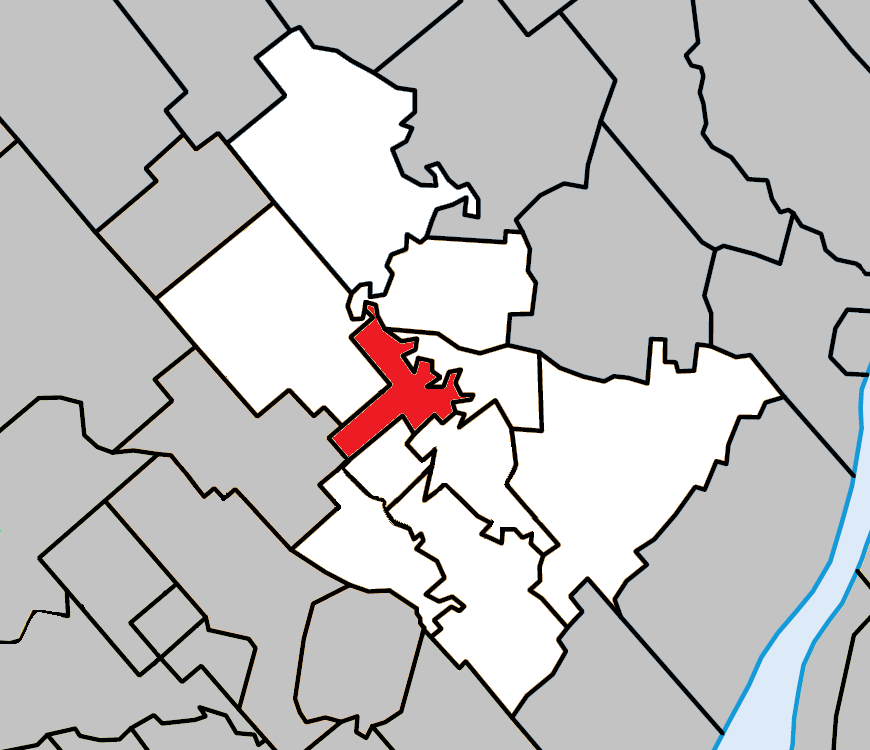
- Location within Joliette RCM.

- Location in central Quebec.
- Coordinates: 46°03′N 73°28′W
- Country: Canada
- Province: Quebec
- Region: Lanaudière
- RCM: Joliette
- Settled: 1855
- Constituted: July 1, 1855
- Named for: Charles Borromeo

Government
  - Mayor: Alexis Nantel
  - Federal riding: Joliette
  - Provincial riding: Joliette

Area
  - Total: 18.70 km^{2} (7.22 sq mi)
  - Land: 18.48 km^{2} (7.14 sq mi)

Population (2021)
  - Total: 15,285
  - Density: 827/km^{2} (2,140/sq mi)
  - Pop 2016-2021: ▲10.8%
  - Dwellings: 7,259
- Demonym(s): Charlois, Charloise
- Time zone: UTC−5 (EST)
  - Summer (DST): UTC−4 (EDT)
- Postal code(s): J6E
- Area code: 450 and 579
- Highways: R-343
- Website: www.st-charles-borromee.org

Saint-Charles-Borromée (French pronunciation: [sɛ̃ ʃaʁl bɔʁɔme]) (2021 Population 15,285) is a city in southwest-central Quebec, Canada, on the l'Assomption River. In Joliette Regional County Municipality, Saint-Charles-Borromée has the Maison Antoine-Lacombe, a heritage home that hosts many exhibits throughout the year. The town is also home to the Centre Saint-Jean-Bosco, which annually hosts the Mémoires et Racines Festival of folk music from various countries and Quebec.

The town takes its name from its original Roman Catholic parish, Saint-Charles-Borromée, which was canonically established in 1683. The parish, in turn, is named after the French form of the name of an Italian Roman Catholic prelate, Charles Borromeo (1538–1584). He was the archbishop of Milan, founded a Roman Catholic order, the Oblates, and became a canonised saint in the Roman Catholic calendar.

== History ==
In 1832, Barthélemy Joliette built a sawmill and a flour mill on the banks of the l'Assomption River. He was soon followed by pioneers from Saint-Ambroise-de-Kildare, Saint-Paul, and Sainte-Mélanie, who began to clear the area. In 1840, the parish Saint-Charles-Borromée was founded, and its canonical occurred in 1843.

Two years later was founded the parish municipality of Saint-Charles-Borromée-du-Village-d'Industrie from Joliette, which decided to separate from the rest of the town in 1864 and was first named L'Industrie. It ceased to exist in 1847, and its territory became part of Berthier County. The parish municipality of Saint-Charles-Borromée was created in 1855. In 1864, when Joliette was erected, Saint-Charles-Borromée lost an important part but still covered a large area.

In 1870, the parish of Saint-Alphonse-de-Liguori took a small part of the west. In 1915, Joliette decided to explain its territory from Saint-Charles-Borromée toward the north and the south. In 1956, the area east of the l'Assomption River decided to separate from Saint-Charles-Borromée, and it became Nortre-Dame-des-Prairies. In 1957, the south of Saint-Charles-Borromée decided to also separate itself and became the parish municipality of Saint-Charles-Borromée-Sud, which later merged with Joliette and became known with the name of "Quartier Base-de-Roc" and "Carrefour du Vieux-Moulin". That section also included the current location of the Galleries Joliette. Finally, the rest of Saint-Charles-Borromée, commonly known as "La Cité de Joliette," merged with Joliette in 1963.

The town became the municipality of Saint-Charles-Borromée in 1986 because Barthélemy Joliette's wife, Marie-Charlotte Tarieu Taillant de Lanaudière, had been largely implied with the construction of the local church. The town was supposed to be named after her, but there was no Sainte-Charlotte so they decided to masculinize the name to that of Saint-Charles-Borromée.

== Demographics ==
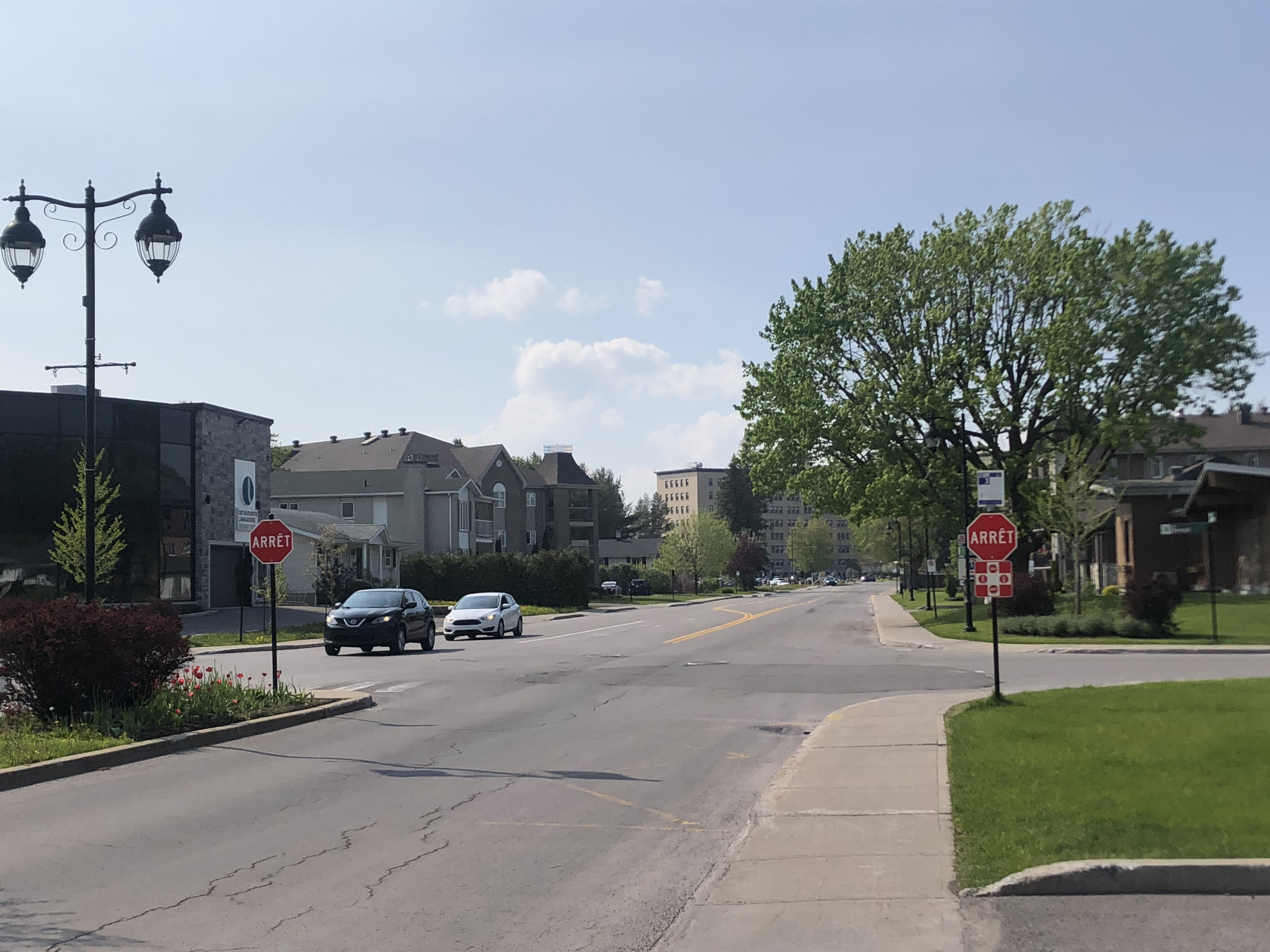

In the 2021 Census of Population conducted by Statistics Canada, Saint-Charles-Borromée had a population of 15,285 living in 6,850 of its 7,259 total private dwellings, a change of 10.8% from its 2016 population of 13,791. With a land area of 18.48 km^{2} (7.14 sq mi), it had a population density of 827.1/km^{2} (2,142.2/sq mi) in 2021.

== Infrastructure ==
=== Public transportation ===
The CTJM serves the area with public buses from 6:20 to 22:10 every week days and from 7:50 to 18:35 every week end days. There is 51 bus stop covering the city, including 7 bus shelter. all of them are connecting with Joliette's terminus on rue Fabre. This terminus will soon be moved to a safer area: rue Saint-Louis, Joliette, in front of the courthouse. The town most northern bus stop is situated on the corner of rue de la Visitation and rue du Curé-M.-Neyron

=== Health ===
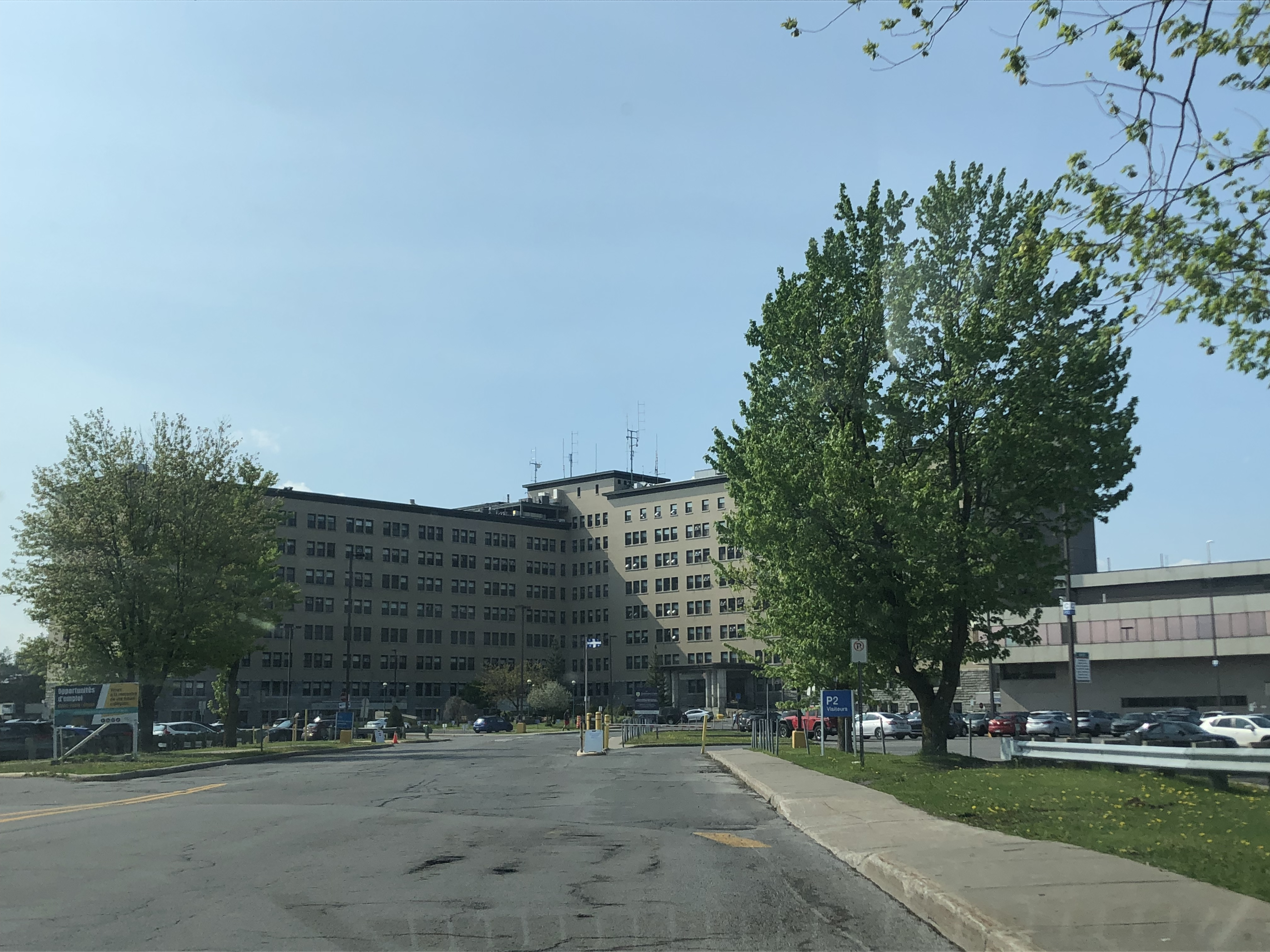
Lanaudière Regional Hospital

The Health and Social Services centre of Northern Lanaudiere (CSSSNL), commonly known as the CHRDL (Lanudiere Regional Hospital Center), is the regional hospital serving the northern part of Lanaudiere. It is situated in the southern part of Saint-Charles-Borromee.

== Education ==
Commission scolaire des Samares operates the francophone public schools.

- École secondaire de l'Espace-Jeunesse
- Saint-Charles-Borromée is the home of two francophone elementary schools: École Lorenzo-Gauthier— Rose-des-Vents (pavillon Lorenzo-Gauthier), on rue Deschênes and École de l'Espace-Jeunesse (pavillon la Traversée), (formerly Sainte-Marie) situated on boulevard Sainte-Anne. The first serves the west of the town. The second serves the east.

Sir Wilfrid Laurier School Board operates the anglophone public schools, including:

- Joliette Elementary School
  - On February 24, 2010, it was decided to transfer Joliette Elementary School from Saint-Paul to Saint-Charles-Borromée in a piece of land on the boulevard l'Assomption Ouest, at the corner of rue Pierre-de-Coubertin. It will be the first English school in Saint-Charles-Borromée and the only one in the county.
- Joliette High School in Joliette

== Notable people ==
- Farah Alibay, systems engineer at the NASA Jet Propulsion Laboratory who has worked on the InSight, Mars Cube One, and Mars 2020 missions.
- Bianca St-Georges, soccer player for Canada

== See also ==
- List of cities in Quebec
