= Lanaudière =

- Administrative region
- Coordinates: 46°46′N 73°50′W
- Country: Canada
- Province: Quebec
- Regional County Municipalities (RCM) and Equivalent Territories (ET): 6 RCM: D'Autray; Joliette; L'Assomption; Les Moulins; Matawinie; Montcalm

Government
  - Table des préfets de Lanaudière (Regional conference of elected officers): Gaétan Morin (President)

Area
  - Land: 12,423.38 km^{2} (4,796.69 sq mi)

Population (2016)
  - Total: 494,796
  - Density: 39.8/km^{2} (103/sq mi)
  - Change 2011-2016: ▲4.9%
- Time zone: UTC-5 (EST)
  - Summer (DST): UTC-4 (EDT)
- Postal code: J
- Area code: 450, 579
- Website: www.lanaudiere.gouv.qc.ca

Lanaudière (French pronunciation: [lanodjɛʁ], locally [lanod͡zjaɛ̯ʁ]) is one of the seventeen administrative regions of Quebec, Canada, situated immediately to the northeast of Montreal. It has a total population (2016 Census) of 494,796 inhabitants, an increase of 4.9% over the 2011 census.

== Geography ==
The region of Lanaudière is part of central Quebec and is located between the Saint Lawrence River and the Laurentian Mountains, between Mauricie and the Laurentides. Lanaudière attracts a good deal of interest from vacationers. Lanaudière's area of 12,413.73 square kilometres (4,792.97 sq mi) stretch northwest from a shoreline of 60 kilometres (37 mi) on the Saint Lawrence River. Lanaudière is generally rural, while the urban areas are generally concentrated in the south of the region, such as Repentigny, Terrebonne and Berthierville. The altitude rises as one goes northwards; it is 20 metres (66 ft) near the Saint Lawrence River to almost 800 metres (2,600 ft) at the top of mountains near Saint-Donat and Saint-Zénon.

Lanaudière is made up of three distinct geographical groupings: the southern plain has cities and farming villages and includes many historical locations; the piedmont in the centre has become a vacation spot due to its numerous lakes and natural attractions, and the Laurentian Plateau in the far north in the forested country is known for its fishing and hiking.

The three main ports of entry for Lanaudière are all in the south: Terrebonne, Repentigny and Berthierville.

Lanaudière's road network was developed according to three north-south axes (25-125, 31-131, 347), all of which have few links with the neighbouring regions. This internal network is almost exclusively composed of secondary roads. Lanaudière has two wildlife preserves, the Rouge-Matawin and the Mastigouche, as well as part of the Mont Tremblant park. Further to the north, about an hour away from Saint-Michel-des-Saints, there is the Atikamekw First Nations reserve of Manawan.

== Administrative divisions ==
=== Regional county municipalities ===
Regional County Municipality (RCM)	Population Canada 2016 Census	Land Area	Density (pop. per km^{2})	Seat of RCM
D'Autray	42,189	1,249.30 km^{2} (482.36 sq mi)	33.8	Berthierville
Joliette	66,550	418.12 km^{2} (161.44 sq mi)	159.2	Joliette
L'Assomption	124,759	255.65 km^{2} (98.71 sq mi)	488.0	L'Assomption
Les Moulins	158,267	261.13 km^{2} (100.82 sq mi)	606.1	Terrebonne
Matawinie	50,435	9,528.17 km^{2} (3,678.85 sq mi)	5.3	Rawdon
Montcalm	52,596	711.02 km^{2} (274.53 sq mi)	74.0	Sainte-Julienne

=== Indian reserve ===
- Manawan

=== School districts ===
The 10 French-language districts have service by the two school service centres of the region and two districts by centres of Laurentides:

- Commission scolaire des Affluents; (L'Assomption, Les Moulins (except a district part of Terrebonne served by Commission scolaire de la Seigneurie-des-Mille-Îles))
- Commission scolaire des Samares (D'Autray, Montcalm, Joliette et Matawinie (except the district of Saint-Donat served by Centre de services scolaire des Laurentides)).

== Major communities ==
- Joliette
- L'Assomption
- L'Épiphanie
- Lavaltrie
- Mascouche
- Notre-Dame-des-Prairies
- Rawdon
- Repentigny
- Saint-Calixte
- Saint-Charles-Borromée
- Saint-Félix-de-Valois
- Saint-Lin-Laurentides
- Sainte-Julienne
- Terrebonne

== See also ==
- List of Quebec regions
