= Berthier County =

Coordinates: 46°12′N 73°15′W

Berthier County was a municipal county of Quebec which existed between 1855 and 1 January 1982.

The territory it covered today is included in the administrative region of Lanaudière and is part of the current regional county municipalities (RMCs) of d'Autray and Matawinie. Its seat was the municipality of Berthierville.

== Municipalities in the County ==
- Berthierville (created in 1852 under the name of Berthier, renamed Berthierville in 1942
- Lanoraie-D'Autray (detached from Saint-Joseph-de-Lanoraie in 1948, together again with it in 2000 to form Lanoraie
- Lavaltrie (detached from Saint-Antoine-de-Lavaltrie in 1926
- La Visitation-de-l'Île-Dupas (created in 1855 under the name L'Isle du Pads; renamed La Visitation-de-la-Sainte-Vierge-de-l'Isle-du-Pads in 1969, renamed La Visitation-de-l'Île-Dupas in 1981
- Saint-Antoine-de-Lavaltrie (established in 1855 merged in Lavaltrie in 2001)
- St. Barthelémi (established in 1855 renamed St. Bartholomew in 1983)
- Saint-Cuthbert (created in 1855)
- Saint-Damien (detached from Saint-Gabriel-de-Brandon 1870)
- Sainte-Geneviève-de-Berthier (created in 1855)
- St. Gabriel (detached from the Parish Municipality of Saint-Gabriel-de-Brandon in 1892 under the name of Village Municipality of Saint-Gabriel-de-Brandon, renamed Saint-Gabriel in 1967)
- Saint-Gabriel-de-Brandon (created in 1855)
- St. Ignatius of Loyola (detached from Isle du Pads in 1897)
- Saint-Joseph-de-Lanoraie (created in 1855 together with Lanoraie-D'Autray in 2000 to form Lanoraie)
- Saint-Michel-des-Saints (established in 1885)
- St. Norbert (established in 1855)
- St. Viator (detached St. Cuthbert in 1912 merged back to it in 1998)
- St. Zeno (established in 1895)

== Formation ==
Berthier County included during its formation parishes and institutions in St. Ignace Island, the Island Pads, Berthier, Lanoraie, Lavaltrie, St. Norbert, St. Cuthbert, St. Bartholomew, St. Gabriel and the Township of Brandon.

== See also ==
- List of municipalities in Quebec
- Berthier, provincial electoral district Quebec;
- Berthier old federal electoral district Quebec;
