= Joseph Lafontaine (Berthier MLA) =

Canadian politician

Member of the Legislative Assembly of Quebec for Berthier
- In office 1904–1912
- Preceded by: Cuthbert-Alphonse Chênevert
- Succeeded by: Joseph-Olivier Gadoury
- In office 1916–1919
- Preceded by: Joseph-Olivier Gadoury
- Succeeded by: Simeon Lafrenière

Personal details
- Born: November 25, 1865 Saint-Barthélémi, Canada East
- Died: July 25, 1920 (aged 54) Saint-Barthélémi, Quebec
- Party: Liberal

Joseph Lafontaine (November 25, 1865 – July 25, 1920) was a farmer and political figure in Quebec. He represented Berthier in the Legislative Assembly of Quebec from 1904 to 1912 and from 1916 to 1919 as a Liberal.

He was born in Saint-Barthélémi, Canada East, the son of Amable Lafontaine and Julie Lincourt, and was educated there, at the Collège de Joliette and the Collège de l'Assomption. Lafontaine was married twice: to Georgie Rochette in 1889 and to Juliette Mousseau in 1905. He was mayor of Saint-Barthélémi from 1897 to 1903 and also served as warden for Berthier County. Lafontaine was president of the school board for Saint-Barthélémi from 1910 to 1919. He was first elected to the Quebec assembly in a 1904 by-election. He was defeated when he ran for reelection in 1912 but elected again in 1916. In 1919, he was named inspector of prisons. Lafontaine died in Saint-Barthélémi at the age of 54.
