= List of unorganized territories in Quebec =

Overview of unorganized territories in Quebec

The following is a list of unincorporated areas (territoires non organisés) in Quebec.

There are no unorganized territories in the following administrative regions: Centre-du-Québec, Chaudière-Appalaches, Estrie, Laval, Montérégie, Montreal.

== List ==
Code	Name	Region	Regional county municipality
88904	Lac-Chicobi	Abitibi-Témiscamingue	Abitibi
88902	Lac-Despinassy	Abitibi-Témiscamingue	Abitibi
87902	Lac-Duparquet	Abitibi-Témiscamingue	Abitibi-Ouest
89912	Lac-Granet	Abitibi-Témiscamingue	La Vallée-de-l'Or
89908	Lac-Metei	Abitibi-Témiscamingue	La Vallée-de-l'Or
85905	Laniel	Abitibi-Témiscamingue	Témiscamingue
85907	Les Lacs-du-Témiscamingue	Abitibi-Témiscamingue	Témiscamingue
89902	Matchi-Manitou	Abitibi-Témiscamingue	La Vallée-de-l'Or
89910	Réservoir-Dozois	Abitibi-Témiscamingue	La Vallée-de-l'Or
87904	Rivière-Ojima	Abitibi-Témiscamingue	Abitibi-Ouest
07912	Lac-Alfred	Bas-Saint-Laurent	La Matapédia
11902	Lac-Boisbouscache	Bas-Saint-Laurent	Les Basques
07908	Lac-Casault	Bas-Saint-Laurent	La Matapédia
10902	Lac-Huron	Bas-Saint-Laurent	Rimouski-Neigette
07914	Lac-Matapédia	Bas-Saint-Laurent	La Matapédia
09904	Lac-à-la-Croix	Bas-Saint-Laurent	La Mitis
09902	Lac-des-Eaux-Mortes	Bas-Saint-Laurent	La Mitis
14904	Petit-Lac-Sainte-Anne	Bas-Saint-Laurent	Kamouraska
14902	Picard	Bas-Saint-Laurent	Kamouraska
08902	Rivière-Bonjour	Bas-Saint-Laurent	La Matanie
07906	Rivière-Patapédia-Est	Bas-Saint-Laurent	La Matapédia
07904	Rivière-Vaseuse	Bas-Saint-Laurent	La Matapédia
07902	Routhierville	Bas-Saint-Laurent	La Matapédia
07910	Ruisseau-des-Mineurs	Bas-Saint-Laurent	La Matapédia
34902	Lac-Blanc	Capitale-Nationale	Portneuf
22902	Lac-Croche	Capitale-Nationale	La Jacques-Cartier
21904	Lac-Jacques-Cartier	Capitale-Nationale	La Côte-de-Beaupré
34906	Lac-Lapeyrère	Capitale-Nationale	Portneuf
16902	Lac-Pikauba	Capitale-Nationale	Charlevoix
34904	Linton	Capitale-Nationale	Portneuf
15902	Mont-Élie	Capitale-Nationale	Charlevoix-Est
15904	Sagard	Capitale-Nationale	Charlevoix-Est
21902	Sault-au-Cochon	Capitale-Nationale	La Côte-de-Beaupré
97908	Caniapiscau	Côte-Nord	Caniapiscau
98904	Lac-Jérôme	Côte-Nord	Minganie
97912	Lac-Juillet	Côte-Nord	Caniapiscau
97914	Lac-Vacher	Côte-Nord	Caniapiscau
97904	Lac-Walker	Côte-Nord	Sept-Rivières
95902	Lac-au-Brochet	Côte-Nord	La Haute-Côte-Nord
98912	Petit-Mécatina	Côte-Nord	Le Golfe-du-Saint-Laurent
97906	Rivière-Mouchalagane	Côte-Nord	Caniapiscau
97902	Rivière-Nipissis	Côte-Nord	Sept-Rivières
96902	Rivière-aux-Outardes	Côte-Nord	Manicouagan
03904	Collines-du-Basque	Gaspésie–Îles-de-la-Madeleine	La Côte-de-Gaspé
04904	Coulée-des-Adolphe	Gaspésie–Îles-de-la-Madeleine	La Haute-Gaspésie
04902	Mont-Albert	Gaspésie–Îles-de-la-Madeleine	La Haute-Gaspésie
02902	Mont-Alexandre	Gaspésie–Îles-de-la-Madeleine	Le Rocher-Percé
05902	Rivière-Bonaventure	Gaspésie–Îles-de-la-Madeleine	Bonaventure
06902	Rivière-Nouvelle	Gaspésie–Îles-de-la-Madeleine	Avignon
03902	Rivière-Saint-Jean	Gaspésie–Îles-de-la-Madeleine	La Côte-de-Gaspé
06904	Ruisseau-Ferguson	Gaspésie–Îles-de-la-Madeleine	Avignon
62920	Baie-Atibenne	Lanaudière	Matawinie
62918	Baie-Obaoca	Lanaudière	Matawinie
62906	Baie-de-la-Bouteille	Lanaudière	Matawinie
62919	Lac-Cabasta	Lanaudière	Matawinie
62904	Lac-Devenyns	Lanaudière	Matawinie
62910	Lac-Legendre	Lanaudière	Matawinie
62908	Lac-Matawin	Lanaudière	Matawinie
62902	Lac-Minaki	Lanaudière	Matawinie
62916	Lac-Santé	Lanaudière	Matawinie
62914	Lac-des-Dix-Milles	Lanaudière	Matawinie
62922	Lac-du-Taureau	Lanaudière	Matawinie
62912	Saint-Guillaume-Nord	Lanaudière	Matawinie
79920	Baie-des-Chaloupes	Laurentides	Antoine-Labelle
79904	Lac-Akonapwehikan	Laurentides	Antoine-Labelle
79910	Lac-Bazinet	Laurentides	Antoine-Labelle
79912	Lac-De La Bidière	Laurentides	Antoine-Labelle
79922	Lac-Douaire	Laurentides	Antoine-Labelle
79924	Lac-Ernest	Laurentides	Antoine-Labelle
79926	Lac-Marguerite	Laurentides	Antoine-Labelle
79914	Lac-Oscar	Laurentides	Antoine-Labelle
79906	Lac-Wagwabika	Laurentides	Antoine-Labelle
79916	Lac-de-la-Maison-de-Pierre	Laurentides	Antoine-Labelle
79902	Lac-de-la-Pomme	Laurentides	Antoine-Labelle
35908	Lac-Boulé	Mauricie	Mékinac
35902	Lac-Masketsi	Mauricie	Mékinac
35904	Lac-Normand	Mauricie	Mékinac
35906	Rivière-de-la-Savane	Mauricie	Mékinac
99904	Baie-d'Hudson	Nord-du-Québec	Administration régionale Kativik
99902	Rivière-Koksoak	Nord-du-Québec	Administration régionale Kativik
83904	Cascades-Malignes	Outaouais	La Vallée-de-la-Gatineau
83912	Dépôt-Échouani	Outaouais	La Vallée-de-la-Gatineau
83906	Lac-Lenôtre	Outaouais	La Vallée-de-la-Gatineau
83908	Lac-Moselle	Outaouais	La Vallée-de-la-Gatineau
84902	Lac-Nilgaut	Outaouais	Pontiac
83902	Lac-Pythonga	Outaouais	La Vallée-de-la-Gatineau
93908	Belle-Rivière	Saguenay–Lac-Saint-Jean	Lac-Saint-Jean-Est
93906	Lac-Achouakan	Saguenay–Lac-Saint-Jean	Lac-Saint-Jean-Est
91902	Lac-Ashuapmushuan	Saguenay–Lac-Saint-Jean	Le Domaine-du-Roy
94928	Lac-Ministuk	Saguenay–Lac-Saint-Jean	Le Fjord-du-Saguenay
93904	Lac-Moncouche	Saguenay–Lac-Saint-Jean	Lac-Saint-Jean-Est
94926	Lalemant	Saguenay–Lac-Saint-Jean	Le Fjord-du-Saguenay
93902	Mont-Apica	Saguenay–Lac-Saint-Jean	Lac-Saint-Jean-Est
94930	Mont-Valin	Saguenay–Lac-Saint-Jean	Le Fjord-du-Saguenay
92902	Passes-Dangereuses	Saguenay–Lac-Saint-Jean	Maria-Chapdelaine
92904	Rivière-Mistassini	Saguenay–Lac-Saint-Jean	Maria-Chapdelaine
92903	Sainte-Élisabeth-de-Proulx	Saguenay–Lac-Saint-Jean	Maria-Chapdelaine
