= Baie-Atibenne =

- Unorganized territory
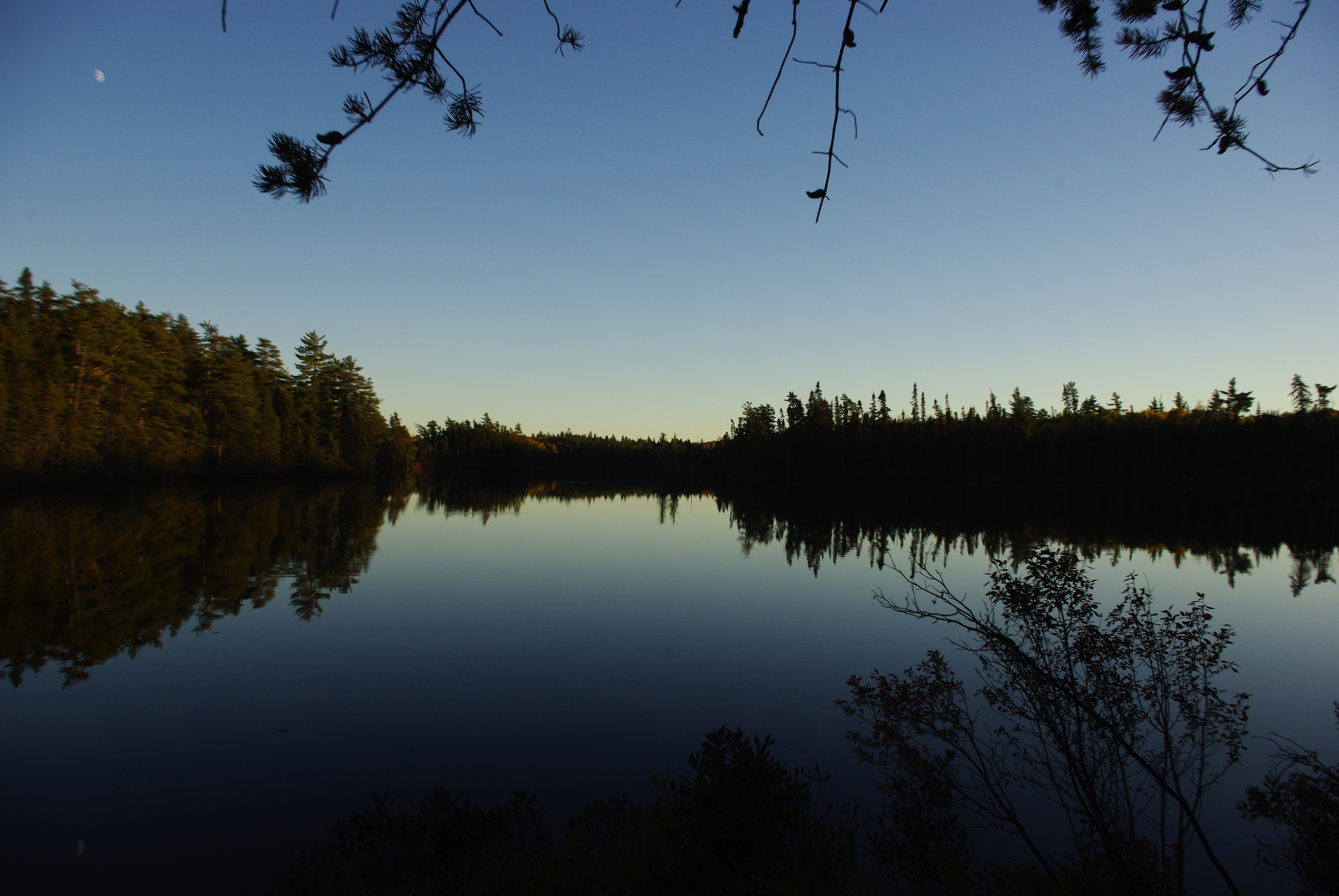
- Lake Morialice

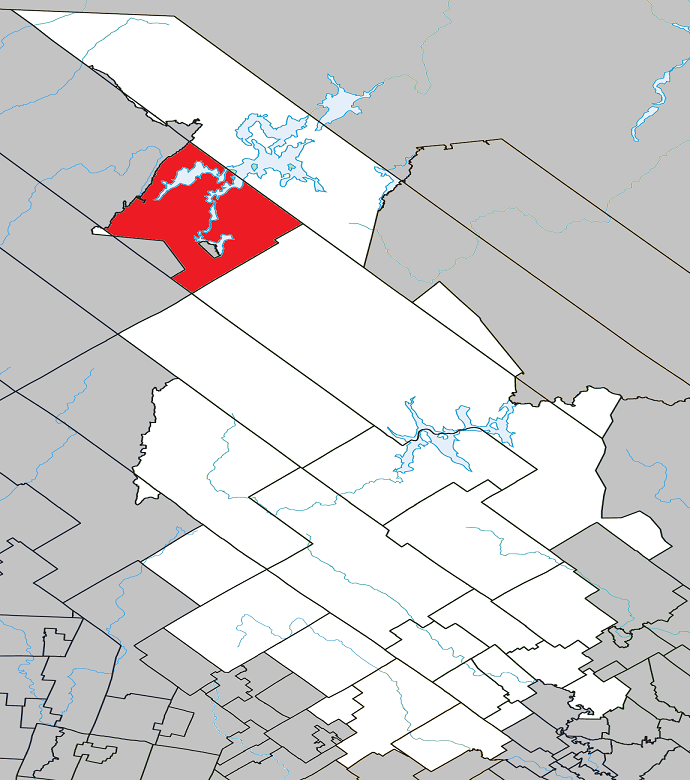
- Location within Matawinie RCM

- Location in central Quebec
- Coordinates: 47°23′N 74°27′W
- Country: Canada
- Province: Quebec
- Region: Lanaudière
- RCM: Matawinie
- Constituted: March 13, 1986

Government
  - Fed. riding: Joliette—Manawan
  - Prov. riding: Berthier

Area
  - Total: 642.54 km^{2} (248.09 sq mi)
  - Land: 527.58 km^{2} (203.70 sq mi)

Population (2021)
  - Total: 0
  - Density: 0/km^{2} (0/sq mi)
  - Change 2016-21: 0.0%
  - Dwellings: 1
- Time zone: UTC−5 (EST)
  - Summer (DST): UTC−4 (EDT)
- Highways: No major routes

Baie-Atibenne (French pronunciation: [bɛ atibɛn]) is an unorganized territory in the Lanaudière region of Quebec, Canada, part of the Matawinie Regional County Municipality. The territory is named after Atibenne Bay of Kempt Lake.

The Atikamekw community of Manawan is an enclave within the territory.

== Demographics ==
Historical census populations – Baie-Atibenne
Year	Pop.	±%
1996	0	—
2001	0	0.00%
2006	0	0.00%
2011	0	0.00%
2016	0	0.00%
2021	0	0.00%
Source: Statistics Canada

== See also ==
- List of unorganized territories in Quebec
