= Lac-Duparquet =

- Unorganized territory
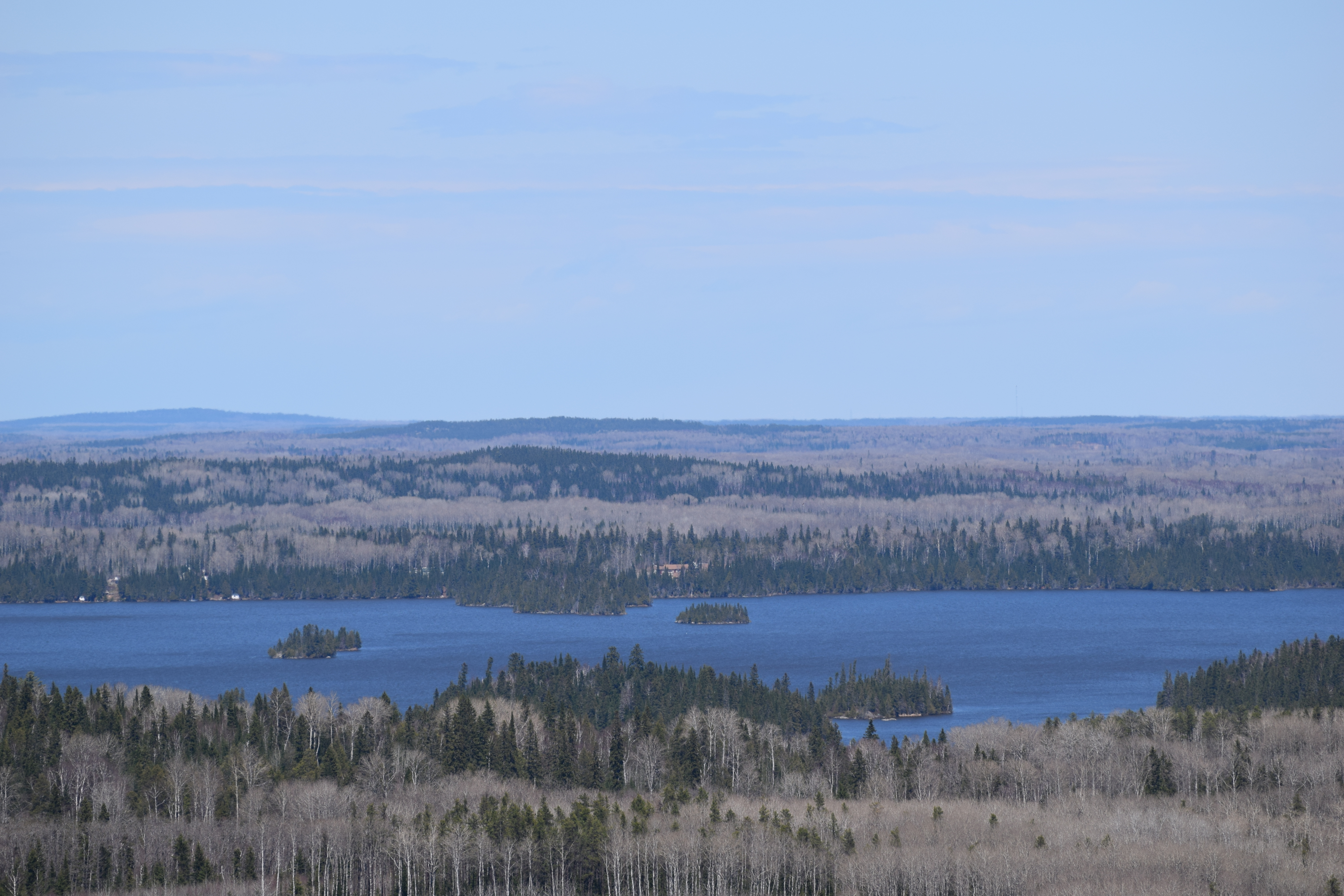
- Lake Hebecourt

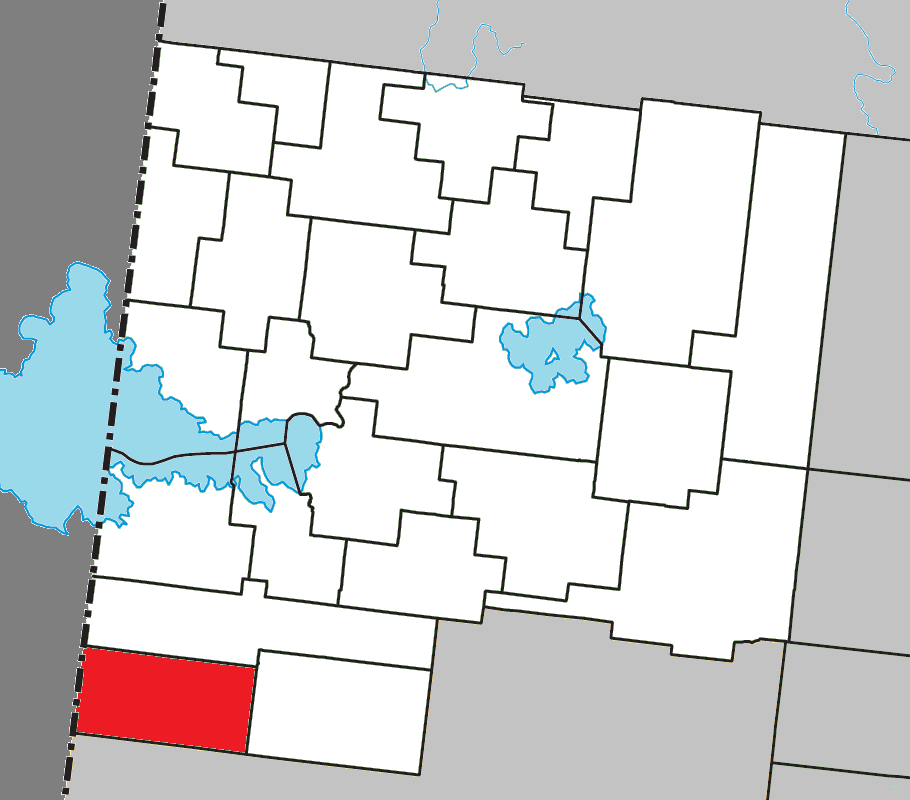
- Location within Abitibi-Ouest RCM

- Location in western Quebec
- Coordinates: 48°28′N 79°25′W
- Country: Canada
- Province: Quebec
- Region: Abitibi-Témiscamingue
- RCM: Abitibi-Ouest
- Constituted: n/a

Government
  - Federal riding: Abitibi—Témiscamingue
  - Prov. riding: Abitibi-Ouest

Area
  - Total: 130.78 km^{2} (50.49 sq mi)
  - Land: 113.66 km^{2} (43.88 sq mi)

Population (2021)
  - Total: 0
  - Density: 0/km^{2} (0/sq mi)
  - Pop (2016-21): 0.0%
  - Dwellings: 0
- Time zone: UTC−05:00 (EST)
  - Summer (DST): UTC−04:00 (EDT)
- Highways: No major routes

Lac-Duparquet (French pronunciation: [lak dypaʁkɛ]) is an unorganized territory in the Abitibi-Témiscamingue region of Quebec, Canada. It is one of two unorganized territories in the Abitibi-Ouest Regional County Municipality but the only one without a permanent population. It is located between the namesake Lake Duparquet and the Quebec/Ontario border.

== Demographics ==
Population:

- Population in 2021: 0
- Population in 2016: 0
- Population in 2011: 0
- Population in 2006: 0
- Population in 2001: 0
