= André Villeneuve =

Canadian politician

His Worship André Villeneuve

Mayor of Lanoraie
- Incumbent
- Assumed office 2021
- Preceded by: Gérard Jean
- In office 2000–2008
- Preceded by: Office established
- Succeeded by: Jacinthe Brissette

Member of the National Assembly of Quebec for Berthier
- In office December 8, 2008 – August 29, 2018
- Preceded by: François Benjamin
- Succeeded by: Caroline Proulx

Mayor of Lanoraie-d'Autray
- In office 1999–2000
- Preceded by: Normand A. Bujold
- Succeeded by: Office abolished

Personal details
- Born: January 13, 1961 (age 65) Lavaltrie, Quebec, Canada
- Party: Parti Québécois
- Spouse: Marielle Boisjoly

André Villeneuve is a Canadian politician. Villeneuve was elected to represent the riding of Berthier in the National Assembly of Quebec in the 2008 provincial election. He is a member of the Parti Québécois.

Villeneuve attended the CEGEP de Maisonneuve and followed courses in humanities, police courses, American history and contemporary international problems as well as course in administration at CEGEP L'Assomption. From 1980 to 1989 he would work in the fields of sales, home improvement, renovation and landscaping before becoming a business chief for a concrete firm after 1989.

In municipal and regional politics, Villeneuve was elected the mayor of Lanoraie was also a prefect for the D'Autray Regional County Municipality. He was also a member of the executive council for the Conseil régional de transport de Lanaudière and Conférence régionale des élus de Lanaudière.

Villeneuve defeated the ADQ's Francois Benjamin in the 2008 provincial elections.
