= Saint-Guillaume-Nord =

- Unorganized territory
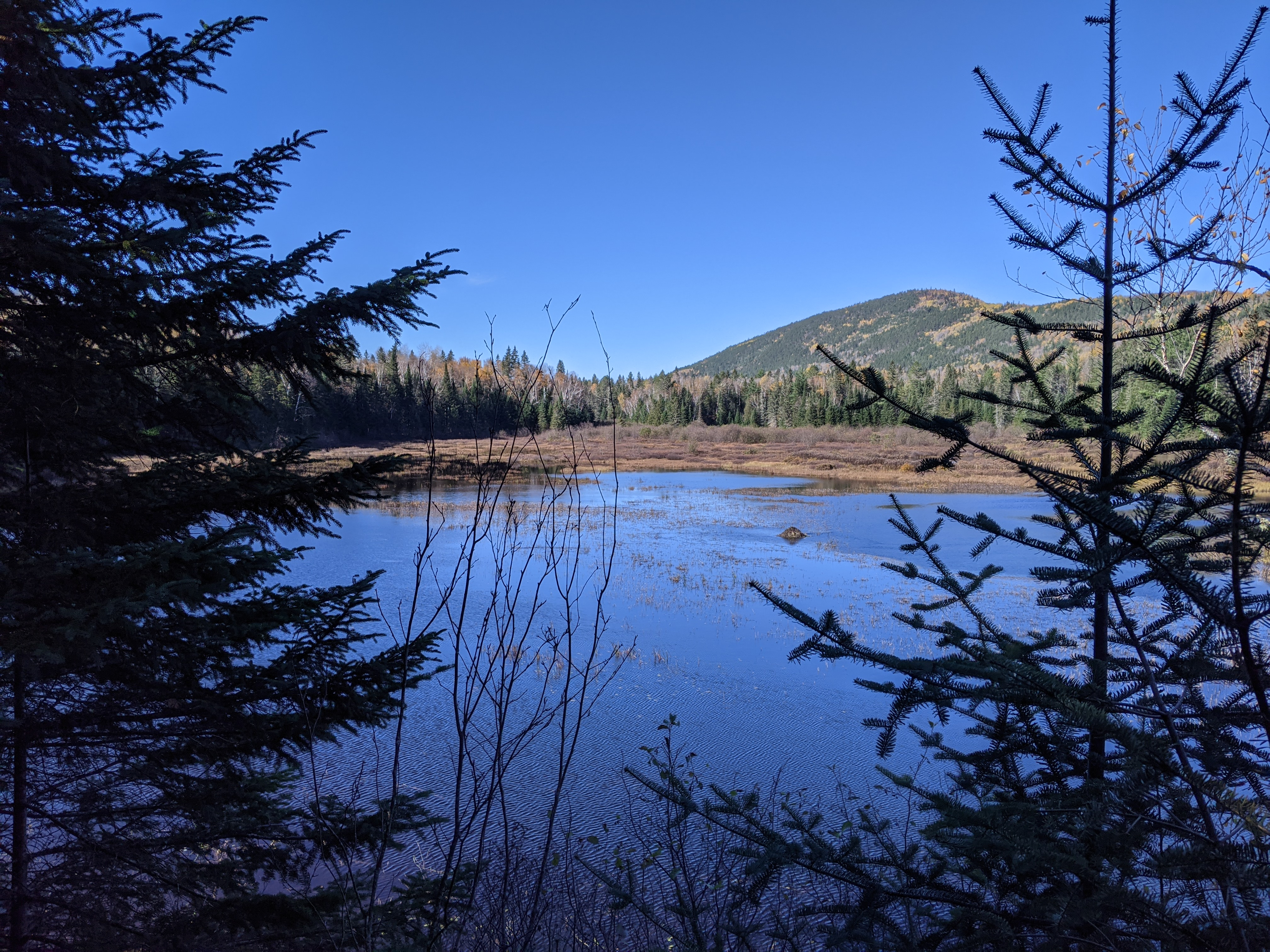
- Lac de l'Assomption

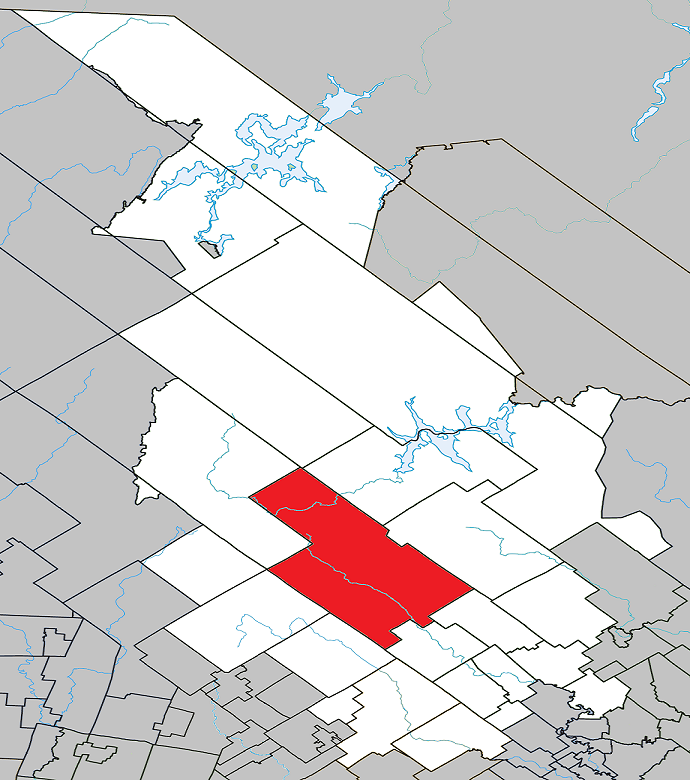
- Location within Matawinie RCM

- Location in central Quebec
- Coordinates: 46°36′N 74°06′W
- Country: Canada
- Province: Quebec
- Region: Lanaudière
- RCM: Matawinie
- Constituted: unspecified

Government
  - Fed. riding: Joliette—Manawan
  - Prov. riding: Berthier

Area
  - Total: 820.4 km^{2} (316.8 sq mi)
  - Land: 752.78 km^{2} (290.65 sq mi)

Population (2021)
  - Total: 102
  - Density: 0.1/km^{2} (0.26/sq mi)
  - Change 2016-21: ▲17.2%
  - Dwellings: 153
- Time zone: UTC−5 (EST)
  - Summer (DST): UTC−4 (EDT)
- Area code(s): 450
- Highways: No major routes

Saint-Guillaume-Nord (French pronunciation: [sɛ̃ ɡijom nɔʁ]) is the southernmost unorganized territory in the Lanaudière region of Quebec, Canada, part of the Matawinie Regional County Municipality.

Its only community is the hamlet of Saint-Guillaume-Nord, located at confluence of the Matawin River and Cypress Creek, a dozen miles west of Saint-Michel-des-Saints and just east of the north-east entrance to the Mont-Tremblant National Park.

== History ==
The hamlet of Saint-Guillaume-Nord was formed in the early twentieth century, when some thirty lots were granted for agricultural purposes in the geographic Township of Gouin. A mission was established on January 21, 1916, dedicated to St. William (French: saint Guillaume). This name was most likely chosen to honour Joseph-Guillaume-Laurent Forbes (1865-1940), pastor at Kahnawake and Sainte-Anne-de-Bellevue, bishop of Joliette in 1913, and subsequently Archbishop of Ottawa in 1928. After the closure of the Northwood Lumber Company, the little parish went into decline since the soil was of too poor quality to meet the former expectations.

== Demographics ==
=== Population ===
Historical census populations – Saint-Guillaume-Nord

Year	Pop.	±%
1986	70	—
1991	83	+18.6%
1996	71	−14.5%
2001	58	−18.3%

Year	Pop.	±%
2006	108	+86.2%
2011	65	−39.8%
2016	87	+33.8%
2021	102	+17.2%

Source: Statistics Canada

Private dwellings occupied by usual residents (2021): 64 (total dwellings: 153)

=== Language ===
Mother tongue (2021):

- English as first language: 4.8%
- French as first language: 95.2%
- English and French as first languages: 0%
- Other as first language: 0%

== See also ==
- List of unorganized territories in Quebec
