= Berthier (provincial electoral district) =

Provincial electoral district in Quebec, Canada

Coordinates: 46°25′N 73°40′W

Quebec electoral district

Provincial electoral district
- Legislature: National Assembly of Quebec
MNA
Elsie Lefebvre
Parti Québécois
- District created: 1867
- First contested: 1867
- Last contested: 2026

Demographics
- Population (2006): 68,669
- Electors (2012): 55,819
- Area (km²): 10,354.1
- Pop. density (per km²): 6.6
- Census division(s): D'Autray (all), Matawinie (part)
- Census subdivision(s): Berthierville, La Visitation-de-l'Île-Dupas, Lanoraie, Mandeville, Saint-Alphonse-Rodriguez, Saint-Barthélemy, Sainte-Béatrix, Saint-Cléophas-de-Brandon, Saint-Côme, Saint-Cuthbert, Saint-Damien, Saint-Didace, Sainte-Élisabeth, Sainte-Émélie-de-l'Énergie, Sainte-Geneviève-de-Berthier, Saint-Félix-de-Valois, Saint-Gabriel, Saint-Gabriel-de-Brandon, Saint-Ignace-de-Loyola, Saint-Jean-de-Matha, Sainte-Marcelline-de-Kildare, Saint-Michel-des-Saints, Saint-Norbert, Saint-Zénon; Manawan; Baie-Atibenne, Baie-de-la-Bouteille, Baie-Obaoca, Lac-Cabasta, Lac-Devenyns, Lac-du-Taureau, Lac-Legendre, Lac-Matawin, Lac-Minaki, Lac-Santé, Saint-Guillaume-Nord

Berthier (French pronunciation: [bɛʁtje]) is a provincial electoral district in the Lanaudière region of Quebec, Canada, that elects members to the National Assembly of Quebec. It notably includes the municipalities of Saint-Félix-de-Valois, Lanoraie, Saint-Jean-de-Matha, Berthierville, Saint-Alphonse-Rodriguez, Saint-Gabriel, Saint-Gabriel-de-Brandon, and Saint-Côme.

It was created for the 1867 election (and an electoral district of that name existed earlier in the Legislative Assembly of the Province of Canada and the Legislative Assembly of Lower Canada).

In the change from the 2001 to the 2011 electoral map, it lost Sainte-Mélanie to the Joliette electoral district but gained Sainte-Marcelline-de-Kildare from that same electoral district.

In 2026, it lost Lavaltrie.

== Members of the Legislative Assembly / National Assembly ==
Legislature	Years	Member	Party
1st	1867–1871	Louis-Joseph Moll	Conservative
2nd	1871–1875	Louis Sylvestre	Liberal
3rd	1875–1878	Louis Sylvestre	Liberal
4th	1878–1881	Joseph Robillard	Conservative
5th	1881–1886	Joseph Robillard	Conservative
6th	1886–1889	Louis Sylvestre	Liberal
6th	1890–1890	Omer Dostaler	Liberal
7th	1890–1892	Cuthbert-Alphonse Chênevert	Liberal
8th	1892–1897	Victor Allard	Conservative
9th	1897–1900	Cuthbert-Alphonse Chênevert	Liberal
10th	1900–1903	Cuthbert-Alphonse Chênevert	Liberal
10th	1904–1904	Joseph Lafontaine	Liberal
11th	1904–1908	Joseph Lafontaine	Liberal
12th	1908–1912	Joseph Lafontaine	Liberal
13th	1912–1916	Joseph-Olivier Gadoury	Conservative
14th	1916–1919	Joseph Lafontaine	Liberal
15th	1919–1923	Simeon Lafrenière	Liberal
16th	1923–1925	Simeon Lafrenière	Liberal
16th	1925–1927	Amédée Sylvestre	Liberal
17th	1927–1931	Cléophas Bastien	Liberal
18th	1931–1935	Cléophas Bastien	Liberal
19th	1935–1936	Cléophas Bastien	Liberal
20th	1936–1939	Cléophas Bastien	Liberal
21st	1939–1944	Cléophas Bastien	Liberal
22nd	1944–1948	Armand Sylvestre	Liberal
23rd	1948–1952	Azellus Lavallée	Union Nationale
24th	1952–1956	Azellus Lavallée	Union Nationale
25th	1956–1960	Azellus Lavallée	Union Nationale
26th	1960–1962	Azellus Lavallée	Union Nationale
27th	1962–1966	Lucien McGuire	Liberal
28th	1966–1970	Guy Gauthier	Union Nationale
29th	1970–1973	Guy Gauthier	Union Nationale
30th	1973–1976	Michel Denis	Liberal
31st	1976–1981	Jean-Guy Mercier	Parti Québécois
32nd	1981–1985	Albert Houde	Liberal
33rd	1985–1989	Albert Houde	Liberal
34th	1989–1994	Albert Houde	Liberal
35th	1994–1998	Gilles Baril	Parti Québécois
36th	1998–2002	Gilles Baril	Parti Québécois
36th	2002–2003	Marie Grégoire	Action démocratique
37th	2003–2007	Alexandre Bourdeau	Parti Québécois
38th	2007–2008	François Benjamin	Action démocratique
39th	2008–2012	André Villeneuve	Parti Québécois
40th	2012–2014	André Villeneuve	Parti Québécois
41st	2014–2018	André Villeneuve	Parti Québécois
42nd	2018–2022	Caroline Proulx	Coalition Avenir Québec
43rd	2022–2026	Caroline Proulx	Coalition Avenir Québec
44th	2026–Present	Elsie Lefebvre	Parti Québécois

== Election results ==
2026 Quebec general election
** Preliminary results — Not yet official **
Party	Candidate	Votes	%	±%
Parti Québécois	Elsie Lefebvre	15,640	43.45	+22.53
Conservative	Steve Piché	7,817	21.72	+10.64
Coalition Avenir Québec	Alex Gagné	5,476	15.21	–35.85
Québec solidaire	Amélie Drainville	3,253	9,04	–4.89
Liberal	Louis-Victor Sylvestre	3,183	8.84	+6.36
Présence	Isabelle Lamothe	227	0.63	N/A
Climat Québec	Jean-Pierre Lacombe	220	0.61	+0.08
Démocratie directe	Louis Jr Simard	177	0.49	N/A
Total valid votes		35,993	98.06	–0.49
Total rejected ballots		713	1.94	+0.49
Turnout		36,706	67.91	+0.06
Electors on the lists		54,047		
Parti Québécois notional gain from Coalition Avenir Québec		Swing		+5.95
Source: Élections Québec

2022 Quebec general election redistributed results
Party	Vote	%
Coalition Avenir Québec	17,405	51.06
Parti Québécois	7,133	20.92
Québec solidaire	4,747	13.93
Conservative	3,777	11.08
Liberal	845	2.48
Climat Québec	182	0.53

2022 Quebec general election
Party	Candidate	Votes	%	±%
Coalition Avenir Québec	Caroline Proulx	21,256	50.97	+5.84
Parti Québécois	Julie Boucher	8,682	20.82	–8.10
Québec solidaire	Amélie Drainville	5,877	14.09	–1.34
Conservative	Benoit Primeau	4,585	10.99	–
Liberal	Hassan Abdallah	1,064	2.55	–5.08
Climat Québec	Claire Aubin	242	0.58	–
Total valid votes		41,706	98.55	+0.40
Total rejected ballots		613	1.45	–0.40
Turnout		42,319	67.85	–1.99
Electors on the lists		62,369	–	–

2018 Quebec general election
Party	Candidate	Votes	%	±%
Coalition Avenir Québec	Caroline Proulx	18,048	45.13	+14.09
Parti Québécois	André Villeneuve	11,567	28.92	-10.68
Québec solidaire	Louise Beaudry	6,169	15.43	+4.42
Liberal	Robert Magnan	3,052	7.63	-12.26
Green	Jérôme St-Jean	687	1.72	+0.45
Citoyens au pouvoir	Rémi Bourdon	467	1.17	
Total valid votes		39,990	98.15	
Total rejected ballots		752	1.85	
Turnout		40,742	69.84	
Eligible voters		58,335		
Coalition Avenir Québec gain from Parti Québécois		Swing		+12.39
Source(s) "Rapport des résultats officiels du scrutin". Élections Québec.

2014 Quebec general election
Party	Candidate	Votes	%	±%
Parti Québécois	André Villeneuve	15,070	39.60	-7.34
Coalition Avenir Québec	Élizabeth Leclerc	11,814	31.04	-1.20
Liberal	Pierre-Luc Bellerose	7,570	19.89	+6.76
Québec solidaire	Louise Beaudry	2,666	7.01	+2.18
Green	Pierre Baril	483	1.27	+0.03
Option nationale	Francis Lamarre	261	0.69	-0.40
Mon pays le Québec	Claude Dupré	193	0.51	–
Total valid votes		38,057	98.15	–
Total rejected ballots		718	1.85	+0.38
Turnout		38,775	68.86	-6.83
Electors on the lists		56,312	–	–
Parti Québécois hold		Swing		-3.07

2012 Quebec general election
Party	Candidate	Votes	%	±%
Parti Québécois	André Villeneuve	19,584	46.94	+4.33
Coalition Avenir Québec	François Benjamin	13,454	32.25	+6.54
Liberal	Catherine Haulard	5,477	13.13	-12.88
Québec solidaire	Louise Beaudry	2,015	4.83	+1.90
Green	Dany Ouellet	518	1.24	-1.48
Option nationale	Raymond Guay	452	1.08	–
Coalition pour la constituante	Pierre Baril	221	0.53	–
Total valid votes		41,721	98.53	–
Total rejected ballots		624	1.47	–
Turnout		42,345	75.69	+15.26
Electors on the lists		55,944	–	–

^ Change is based on redistributed results. Coalition Avenir change is from Action démocratique.

2008 Quebec general election
Party	Candidate	Votes	%	±%
Parti Québécois	André Villeneuve	13,776	42.50	+7.77
Liberal	Norman Blackburn	8,435	26.02	+8.63
Action démocratique	François Benjamin	8,358	25.79	-16.45
Québec solidaire	Jocelyne Dupuis	934	2.88	+0.05
Green	Yan Beaudry	911	2.81	-0.01
Total valid votes		32,414	98.16	–
Total rejected ballots		608	1.84	–
Turnout		33,022	60.43	-12.30
Electors on the lists		54,647	–	–

2007 Quebec general election
Party	Candidate	Votes	%	±%
Action démocratique	François Benjamin	16,242	42.24	+10.38
Parti Québécois	Alexandre Bourdeau	13,354	34.73	-0.27
Liberal	Carole Majeau	6,687	17.39	-13.93
Québec solidaire	Jocelyne Dupuis	1,087	2.83	+1.00*
Green	André Chauvette	1,084	2.82	–
Total valid votes		38,454	98.89	–
Total rejected ballots		432	1.11	–
Turnout		38,886	72.73	+3.36
Electors on the lists		53,464	–	–

* Result compared to UFP

2003 Quebec general election
Party	Candidate	Votes	%	±%
Parti Québécois	Alexandre Bourdeau	12,101	35.00	+7.08
Action démocratique	Marie Grégoire	11,014	31.86	-19.14
Liberal	Carole Majeau	10,828	31.32	+10.25
UFP	Pierre Gravel	632	1.83	–
Total valid votes		34,575	98.45	–
Total rejected ballots		546	1.55	–
Turnout		35,121	69.37	+4.00
Electors on the lists		50,631	–	–

Quebec provincial by-election, June 17, 2002
Party	Candidate	Votes	%	±%
Action démocratique	Marie Grégoire	16,389	51.00	+37.35
Parti Québécois	David Levine	8,973	27.92	-25.66
Liberal	Carole Majeau	6,771	21.07	-10.19
Total valid votes		32,133	98.42	–
Total rejected ballots		515	1.58	–
Turnout		32,648	65.37	-14.14
Electors on the lists		49,941	–	–

1998 Quebec general election
Party	Candidate	Votes	%	±%
Parti Québécois	Gilles Baril	20,074	53.58	−0.08
Liberal	Sylvie Thouin	11,710	31.26	−5.04
Action démocratique	Robert Robitaille	5,113	13.65	+5.31
Socialist Democracy	François Rivest	297	0.79	–
Natural Law	Louise Roy	268	0.72	+0.01
Total valid votes		37,462	98.59	–
Rejected and declined votes		535	1.41	–
Turnout		37,997	79.51	−2.51
Electors on the lists		47,790	–	–
Source: Official Results, Le Directeur général des élections du Québec.

1995 Quebec referendum
Side	Votes	%
Oui	25,986	63.02
Non	15,249	36.98

== See also ==
- List of Quebec provincial electoral districts
- Canadian provincial electoral districts
