= Lac-Devenyns =

- Unorganized territory
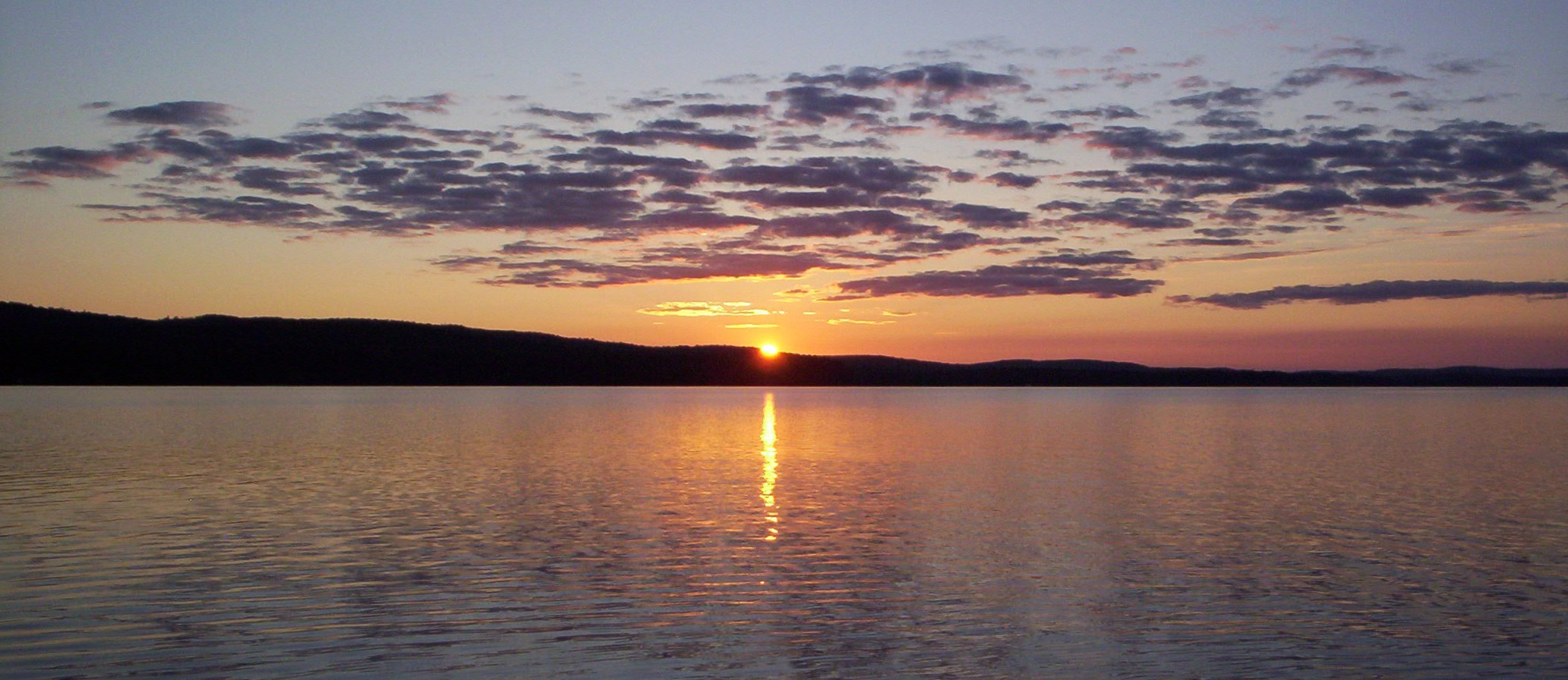
- Lake Devenyns

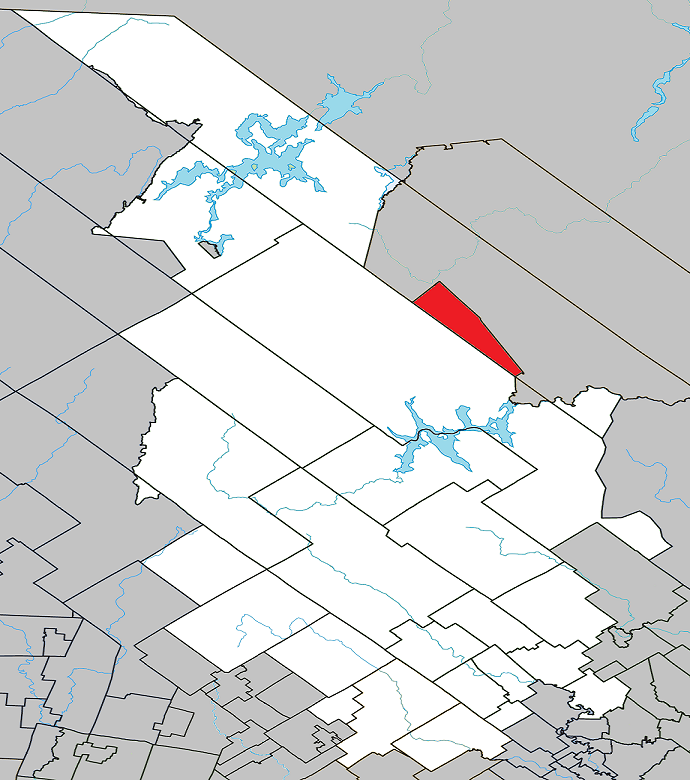
- Location within Matawinie RCM

- Location in central Quebec
- Coordinates: 47°05′N 73°50′W
- Country: Canada
- Province: Quebec
- Region: Lanaudière
- RCM: Matawinie
- Constituted: January 1, 1986

Government
  - Fed. riding: Joliette—Manawan
  - Prov. riding: Berthier

Area
  - Total: 134.73 km^{2} (52.02 sq mi)
  - Land: 100.71 km^{2} (38.88 sq mi)

Population (2021)
  - Total: 5
  - Density: 0/km^{2} (0/sq mi)
  - Change 2016-21: ▲ N/A
  - Dwellings: 27
- Time zone: UTC−5 (EST)
  - Summer (DST): UTC−4 (EDT)
- Highways: No major routes

Lac-Devenyns is an unorganized territory in the Lanaudière region of Quebec, Canada, part of the Matawinie Regional County Municipality.

It is named after Lake Devenyns, which in turn was named after Léonard Devenyns, a Belgian industrialist who lived near La Tuque.

== Demographics ==
Historical census populations – Lac-Devenyns
Year	Pop.	±%
1996	4	—
2001	0	−100.0%
2006	0	0.00%
2011	0	0.00%
2016	0	0.00%
2021	5	—
Source: Statistics Canada

== See also ==
- List of unorganized territories in Quebec
