= Sainte-Marcelline-de-Kildare =

- Municipality
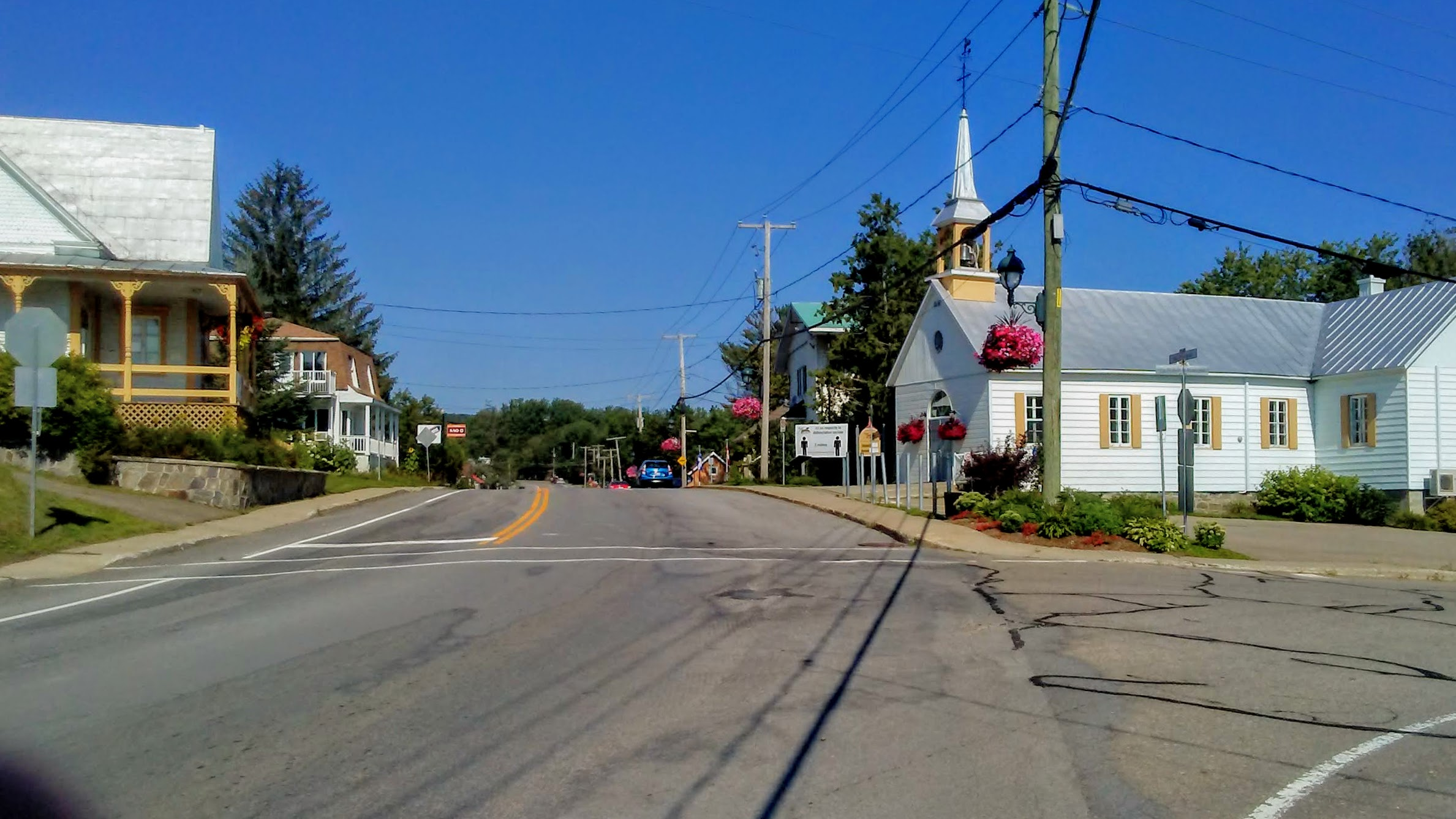

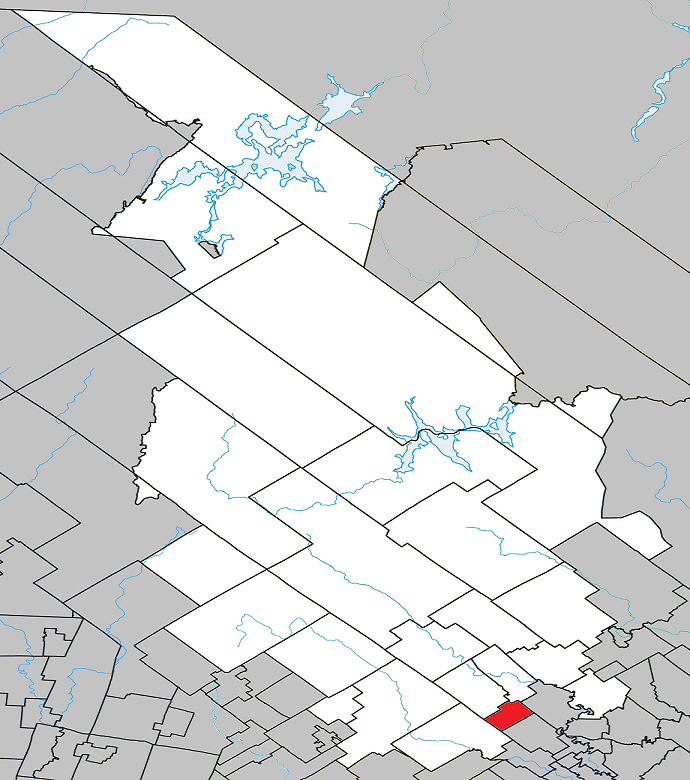
- Location within Matawinie RCM

- Location in central Quebec
- Coordinates: 46°07′N 73°36′W
- Country: Canada
- Province: Quebec
- Region: Lanaudière
- RCM: Matawinie
- Constituted: January 1, 1956

Government
  - Mayor: Émilie Boisvert
  - Federal riding: Joliette—Manawan
  - Prov. riding: Berthier

Area
  - Total: 36.25 km^{2} (14.00 sq mi)
  - Land: 34.52 km^{2} (13.33 sq mi)

Population (2021)
  - Total: 1,795
  - Density: 52/km^{2} (130/sq mi)
  - Pop (2016-21): ▲12.6%
  - Dwellings: 1,019
- Time zone: UTC−5 (EST)
  - Summer (DST): UTC−4 (EDT)
- Postal code(s): J0K 2Y0
- Area codes: 450 and 579
- Highways: R-343
- Website: ste-marcelline.com

Sainte-Marcelline-de-Kildare is a municipality in the Lanaudière region of Quebec, Canada, part of the Matawinie Regional County Municipality.

== Etymology ==
Saint Marcellina was a Catholic saint who lived in the 4th century. The town was named in her honour because she was the elder sister of Ambrose, another saint, whose name was chosen for the neighboring municipality of Saint-Ambroise-de-Kildare. Since the municipality of Sainte-Marcelline-de-Kildare was created from territories of Saint-Ambroise-de-Kildare, it made sense to name the municipality after her. The name Kildare honors the town of Kildare, Ireland, from which most of the first settlers of the municipality came.

== Demographics ==
=== Population ===
Historical Census Data - Sainte-Marcelline-de-Kildare, Quebec

Year	Pop.	±%
1956	406	—
1961	460	+13.3%
1966	459	−0.2%
1971	553	+20.5%
1976	654	+18.3%

Year	Pop.	±%
1981	792	+21.1%
1986	914	+15.4%
1991	1,102	+20.6%
1996	1,221	+10.8%
2001	1,279	+4.8%

Year	Pop.	±%
2006	1,423	+11.3%
2011	1,567	+10.1%
2016	1,594	+1.7%
2021	1,795	+12.6%

Source: Statistics Canada

Private dwellings occupied by usual residents (2021): 829 (total dwellings: 1,019)

=== Language ===
Mother tongue (2021):

- English as first language: 2.2%
- French as first language: 95.3%
- English and French as first language: 1.4%
- Other as first language: 1.1%

== Education ==
Commission scolaire des Samares operates Francophone public schools:

- École de Sainte-Marcelline

Sir Wilfrid Laurier School Board operates Anglophone public schools:

- Rawdon Elementary School in Rawdon
- Joliette High School in Joliette

== See also ==
- List of municipalities in Quebec
