= Caroline Proulx =

Canadian politician

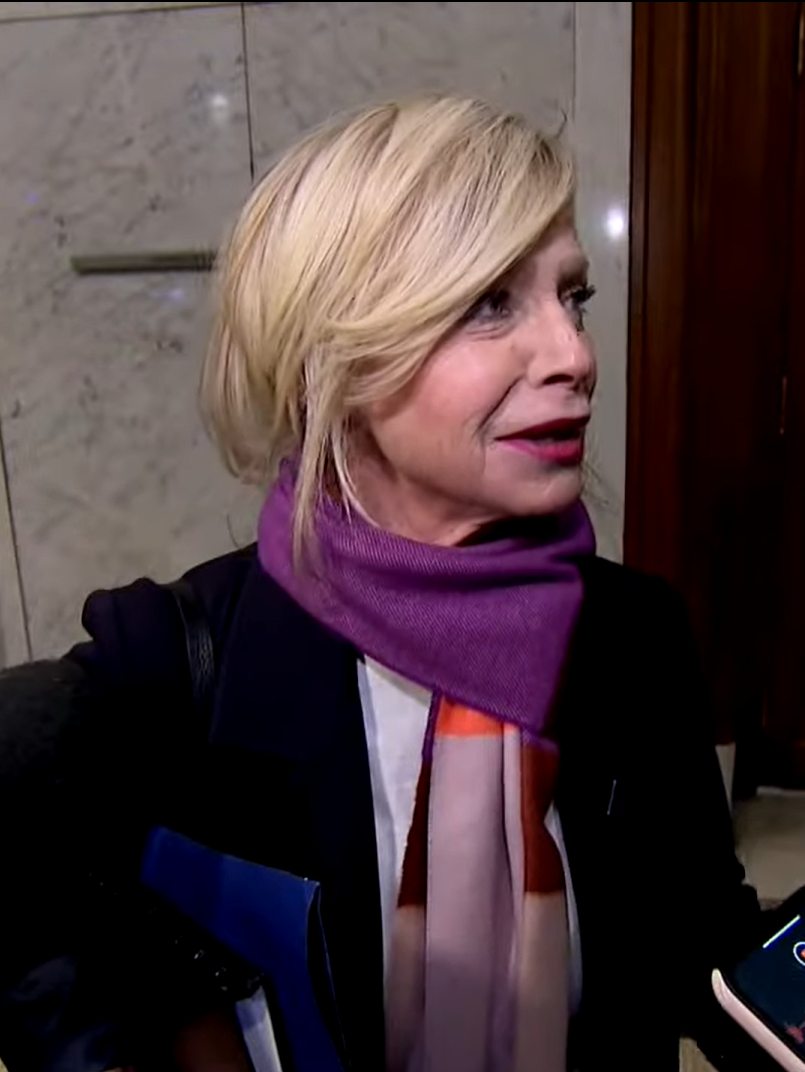
- Proulx in 2023

Member of the National Assembly of Quebec for Berthier
- In office October 1, 2018 – August 27, 2026
- Preceded by: André Villeneuve
- Succeeded by: Elsie Lefebvre

Minister of Tourism
- In office October 18, 2018 – September 10, 2025
- Preceded by: Julie Boulet
- Succeeded by: Amélie Dionne

Personal details
- Born: June 26, 1966 (age 60) Saint-Jean-de-Matha, Quebec, Canada
- Party: Coalition Avenir Québec

Caroline Proulx is a Canadian politician who was elected to the National Assembly of Quebec in the 2018 provincial election. She represented the electoral district of Berthier as a member of the Coalition Avenir Québec and was the Minister of Tourism. She did not seek re-election in the 2026 general election.

In July 2026, she was ordered by a judge to pay over $60,000 after it was ruled that Proulx had violated the freedom of expression of an evangelical Christian organization as a Cabinet minister, when the government did not allow the faith group to hold an event in Quebec City in 2023.

== Electoral record ==
2022 Quebec general election: Berthier
Party	Candidate	Votes	%	±%
Coalition Avenir Québec	Caroline Proulx	21,256	50.97	+5.84
Parti Québécois	Julie Boucher	8,682	20.82	–8.10
Québec solidaire	Amélie Drainville	5,877	14.09	–1.34
Conservative	Benoit Primeau	4,585	10.99	–
Liberal	Hassan Abdallah	1,064	2.55	–5.08
Climat Québec	Claire Aubin	242	0.58	–
Total valid votes		41,706	98.55	+0.40
Total rejected ballots		613	1.45	–0.40
Turnout		42,319	67.85	–1.99
Electors on the lists		62,369	–	–

2018 Quebec general election: Berthier
Party	Candidate	Votes	%	±%
Coalition Avenir Québec	Caroline Proulx	18,048	45.13	+14.09
Parti Québécois	André Villeneuve	11,567	28.92	-10.68
Québec solidaire	Louise Beaudry	6,169	15.43	+4.42
Liberal	Robert Magnan	3,052	7.63	-12.26
Green	Jérôme St-Jean	687	1.72	+0.45
Citoyens au pouvoir	Rémi Bourdon	467	1.17	
Total valid votes		39,990	98.15	
Total rejected ballots		752	1.85	
Turnout		40,742	69.84	
Eligible voters		58,335		
Coalition Avenir Québec gain from Parti Québécois		Swing		+12.39
Source(s) "Rapport des résultats officiels du scrutin". Élections Québec.
