= Lac-Legendre =

- Unorganized territory
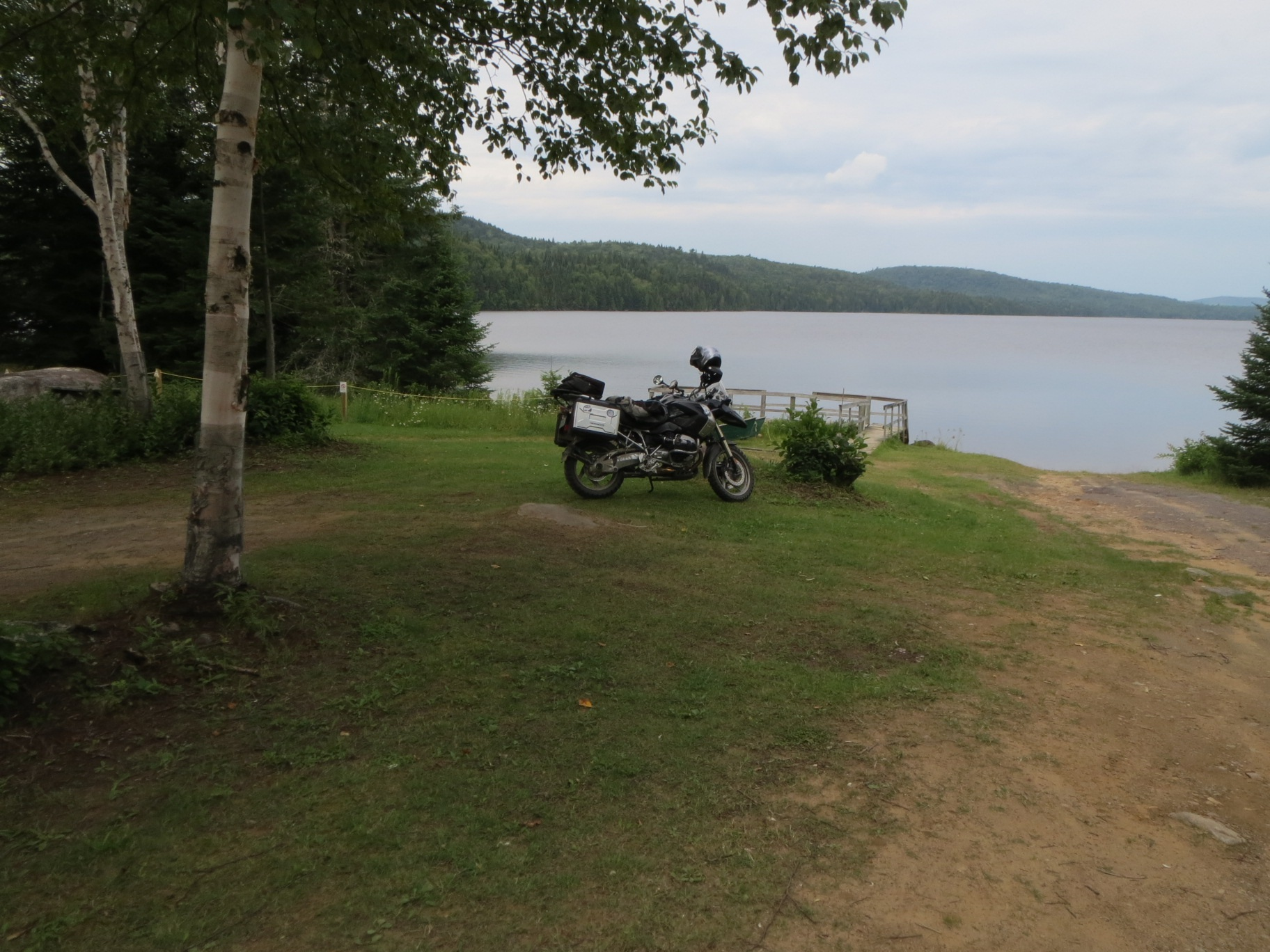

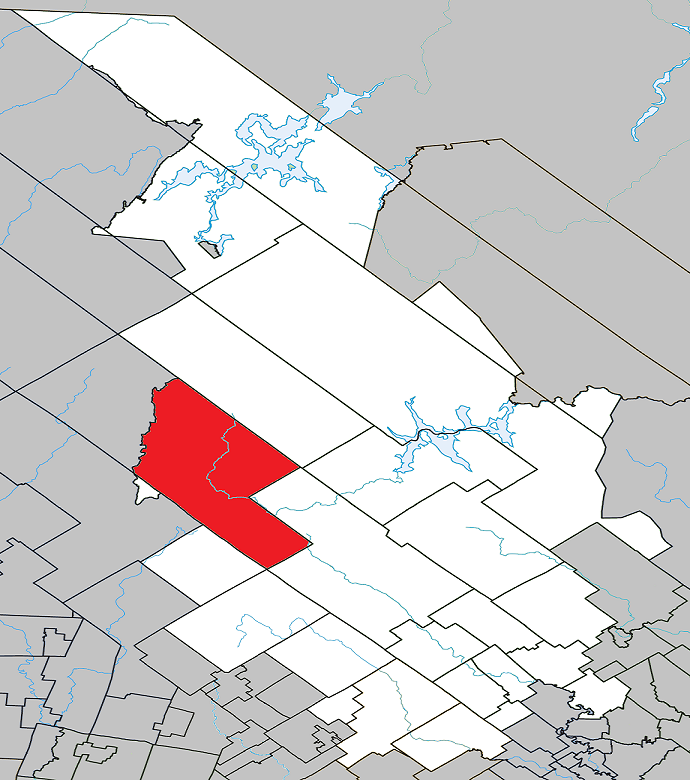
- Location within Matawinie RCM

- Location in central Quebec
- Coordinates: 46°41′N 74°22′W
- Country: Canada
- Province: Quebec
- Region: Lanaudière
- RCM: Matawinie
- Constituted: January 1, 1986

Government
  - Fed. riding: Joliette—Manawan
  - Prov. riding: Berthier

Area
  - Total: 770.28 km^{2} (297.41 sq mi)
  - Land: 693.58 km^{2} (267.79 sq mi)

Population (2021)
  - Total: 0
  - Density: 0/km^{2} (0/sq mi)
  - Change 2016-21: 0.0%
  - Dwellings: 0
- Time zone: UTC−5 (EST)
  - Summer (DST): UTC−4 (EDT)
- Highways: No major routes

Lac-Legendre (French pronunciation: [lak ləʒɑ̃dʁ]) is an unorganized territory in the Lanaudière region of Quebec, Canada, part of the Matawinie Regional County Municipality.

Within the territory are both Lake Legendre and the geographic township of Legendre (proclaimed in 1966), named after Napoléon Legendre (1841–1907), writer, lawyer and attorney.

== Demographics ==
Historical census populations – Lac-Legendre
Year	Pop.	±%
1996	0	—
2001	0	0.00%
2006	0	0.00%
2011	0	0.00%
2016	0	0.00%
2021	0	0.00%
Source: Statistics Canada

== See also ==
- List of unorganized territories in Quebec
