= Marie Jean-Eudes Tellier =

Sister Jean-Eudes guiding a group of students through her museum

Sister Marie Jean-Eudes, S.S.A., born Eugénie Tellier, (1897, Saint-Damien, Quebec—1978, Lachine, Quebec) was a Canadian botanist and a member of the Sisters of Saint Ann. She worked on the popularization of science and published several papers in the fields of biology, geology and botany.

Sister Jean-Eudes is considered a pioneer in the study of natural sciences. The Province of Quebec established a nature preserve named in her honor in 1992, due to her contributions to science.

== Biography ==
A former student of Brother Marie-Victorin Kirouac, F.S.C., between 1925 and 1931, she studied at the Botanical Institute of the University of Montreal. In 1943 she completed a master's degree in botany. Her thesis was entitled "La flore de Rawdon". As part of her research project she put together an herbarium of over 1,200 species.

In 1931 Sister Jean-Eudes became a coordinator of the Cercles des Jeunes Naturalistes division in the schools run by her congregation. In 1942 she became responsible for a museum which was maintained in St. Anne Convent, in Lachine, the motherhouse of her religious congregation. She re-organized it as a Natural History Museum. This collection was donated in the early 1970s to the Cité-des-Jeunes High School in Vaudreuil, Quebec, where her congregation was founded. In 1995 it was permanently housed in the Musée de la nature et des sciences in Sherbrooke.

In 1963 Sister Jean-Eudes started working on a monograph about the "Cercles des Jeunes Naturalistes", which was published only in 1981, after her death.

== Sources ==
- Noms et lieux du Québec, ouvrage de la Commission de toponymie paru en 1994 et 1996 sous la forme d'un dictionnaire illustré imprimé, et sous celle d'un cédérom réalisé par la société Micro-Intel, en1997, à partir de ce dictionnaire.
- Jean-Eudes, Marie, Les cercles des Jeunes Naturalistes, Éditions Sainte-Anne, Lachine, 1981.
