= Atikamekw of Manawan =

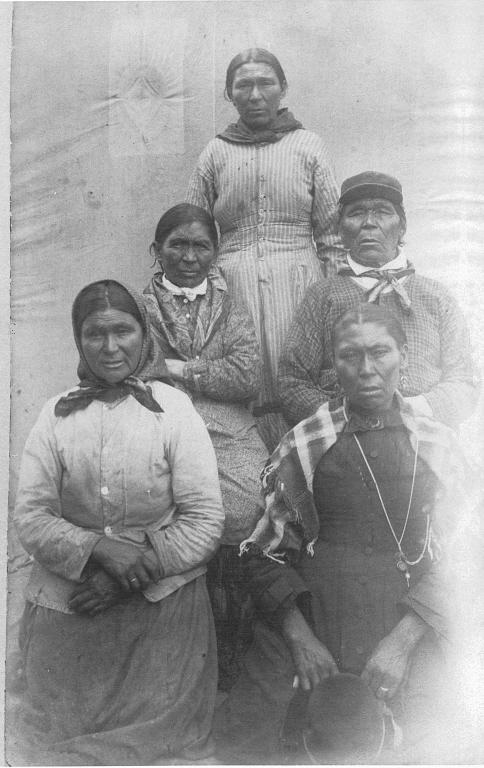
Atikamekw of Manawan circa 1900

Atikamekw of Manawan (French: Les Atikamekw de Manawan) are an Atikamekw First Nation in Quebec, Canada. They live primarily in the Atikamekw community of Manawan, an Indian reserve located in Lanaudière. In 2016, the band has a registered population of 2,892 members. It is governed by the Manawan Atikamekw Council (French: Conseil Atikamekw de Manawan) and is affiliated with the Conseil de la Nation Atikamekw, the Atikamekw tribal council.

== Demographics ==
The members of the Manawan First Nation are Atikamekw. In October 2016, the band had a total registered population of 2,892 members, 409 of them were living off reserve. According to Statistics Canada's 2011 census, the median age of the population is 19 years old.

== Geography ==
Atikamekw of Manawan live primarily on the Indian reserve of the same name, Manawan, located in Lanaudière, Quebec at 113 km northeast of Mont-Laurier. The service center located nearest is Saint-Michel-des-Saints and the closest important city is Montreal.

== Culture ==
Culture, traditions and way of life of people of Manawan are governed by the six seasons that determine the activities and the travels on the territory. During each season there is a main activity and the camp site is different. The relationship with nature changes according to the season.

Atikamekw season	English translation	Corresponding months	Activities
Nipin	Summer	July, August	Blueberry season, net fishing, small game hunting, manufacture of bark basket
Takwakin	Autumn	September, October	Moose rut period, moose hunting
Pitcipipon	Pre-Winter	November, December	Trapping season, pose of hare's collars, capture by hand of beavers
Pipon	Winter	January, February	Season of ice fishing
Sikon	Pre-Spring	March, April	Season of maple sugar
Miroskamin	Spring	May, June	Duck and partridge hunting

== Languages ==
Atikamekw of Manawan speak Atikamekw language, a language of the Algonquian languages family. Atikamekw language is known by all the community and is the main language for day-to-day communication. It is the teaching language from pre-school to the third year of primary school. After that, teaching is done in French, which is the second language spoken by all the community.

== Governance ==
Manawan First Nation is governed by a band council called Conseil Atikamekw de Manawan (French for "Atikamekw Council of Manawan") elected according to a custom electoral system based on Section 11 of the Indian Act. For 2014-2018 tenure, this council is composed of the chief Jean-Roch Ottawa and six councilors.
