= Lac-Minaki =

- Unorganized territory
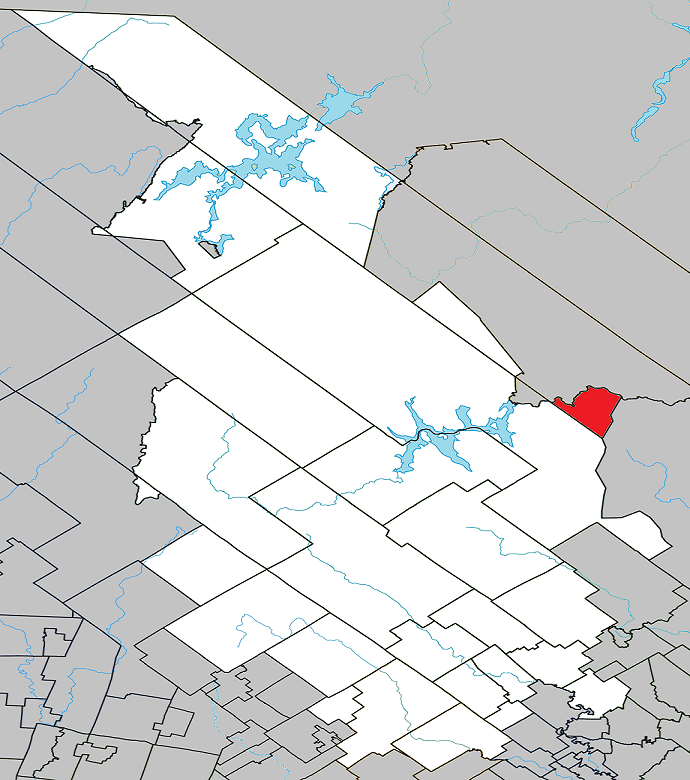
- Location within Matawinie RCM

- Location in central Quebec
- Coordinates: 46°53′N 73°29′W
- Country: Canada
- Province: Quebec
- Region: Lanaudière
- RCM: Matawinie
- Constituted: January 1, 1986

Government
  - Fed. riding: Joliette—Manawan
  - Prov. riding: Berthier

Area
  - Total: 82.28 km^{2} (31.77 sq mi)
  - Land: 80.59 km^{2} (31.12 sq mi)

Population (2021)
  - Total: 0
  - Density: 0/km^{2} (0/sq mi)
  - Change 2016-21: 0.0%
  - Dwellings: 0
- Time zone: UTC−5 (EST)
  - Summer (DST): UTC−4 (EDT)
- Highways: No major routes

Lac-Minaki (French pronunciation: [lak minaki]) is an unorganized territory in the Lanaudière region of Quebec, Canada, part of the Matawinie Regional County Municipality. The namesake Lake Minaki is located within the territory.

== Demographics ==
Historical census populations – Lac-Minaki
Year	Pop.	±%
1996	0	—
2001	0	0.00%
2006	0	0.00%
2011	0	0.00%
2016	0	0.00%
2021	0	0.00%
Source: Statistics Canada

== See also ==
- List of unorganized territories in Quebec
