= Lanoraie =

- Municipality
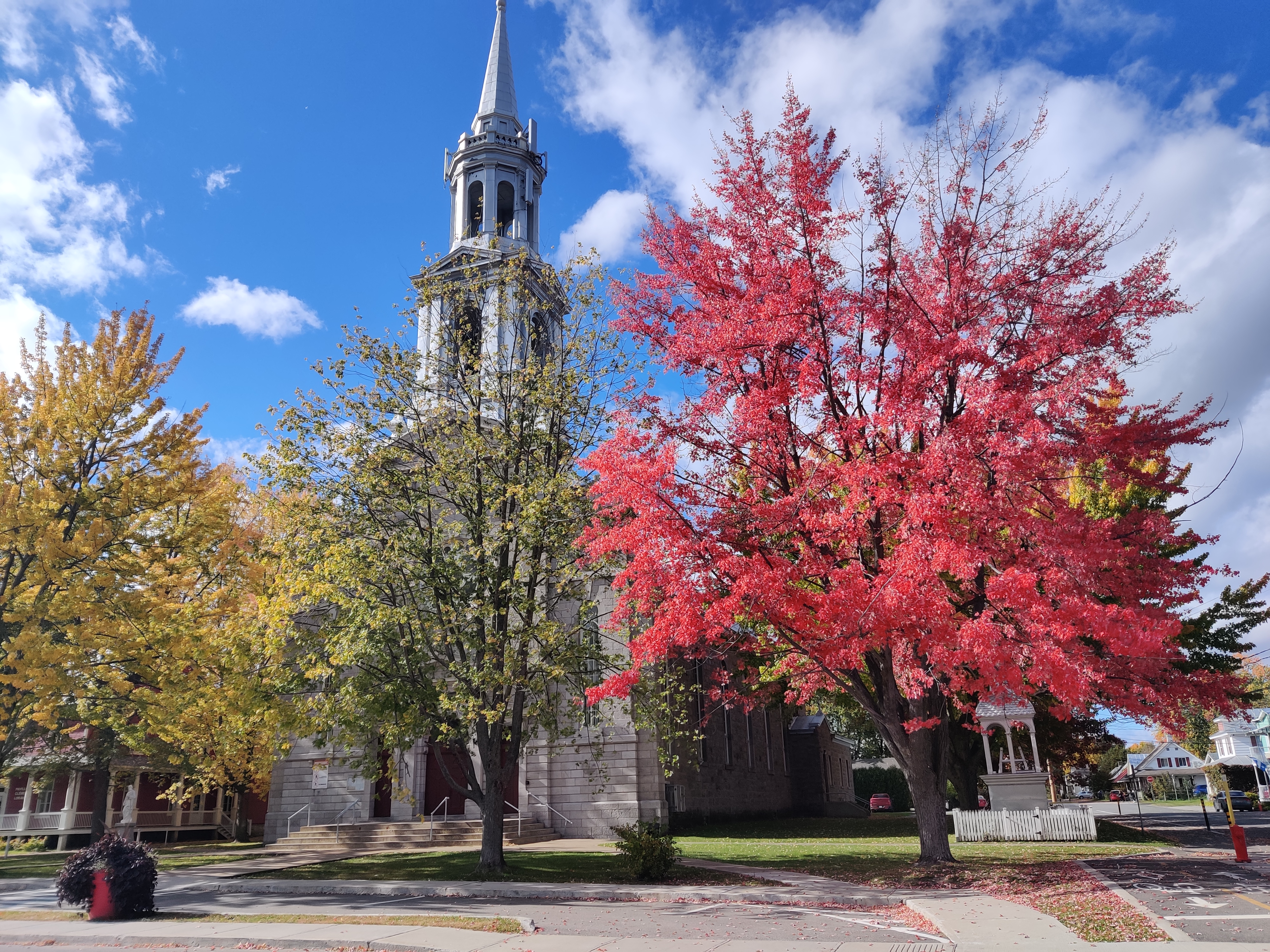
- Église Saint-Joseph de Lanoraie, 9 Oct 2022

- Coat of arms
- Motto: Ferme est ma foy (French for "Firm is my faith")
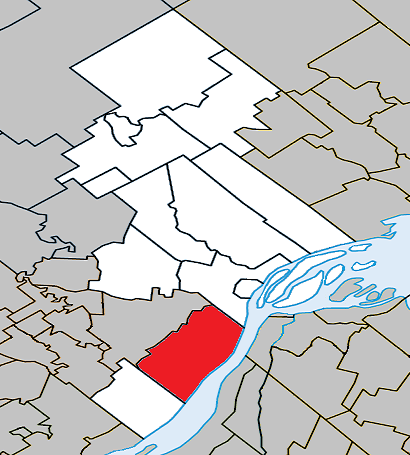
- Location within D'Autray RCM

- Location in central Quebec
- Coordinates: 45°58′N 73°13′W
- Country: Canada
- Province: Quebec
- Region: Lanaudière
- RCM: D'Autray
- Settled: 1732
- Constituted: December 6, 2000

Government
  - Mayor: André Villeneuve
  - Federal riding: Berthier—Maskinongé
  - Prov. riding: Berthier

Area
  - Total: 115.47 km^{2} (44.58 sq mi)
  - Land: 102.74 km^{2} (39.67 sq mi)

Population (2021)
  - Total: 5,134
  - Density: 50/km^{2} (130/sq mi)
  - Change 2016-21: ▲7.2%
  - Dwellings: 2,199
- Time zone: UTC−5 (EST)
  - Summer (DST): UTC−4 (EDT)
- Postal code(s): J0K 1E0
- Area codes: 450, 579
- Highways A-40: R-138
- Website: www.lanoraie.ca

Lanoraie (French pronunciation: [lanɔʁɛ]) is a town in the D'Autray Regional County Municipality in the Lanaudière region of Quebec, Canada.

== History ==
When Jacques Cartier passed through in the 16th century, the Iroquois had already established themselves in the area, calling it Agochanda or Agouchonda, meaning "place where one stops to eat and rest". It was also in this area in 1642 that Isaac Jogues was abducted by the Mohawks along with Guillaume Couture and René Goupil, and taken into captivity and tortured.

In 1672, the Intendant of New France Jean Talon granted the territory as a seignory to Louis de Niort de La Noraye (1639-1708). In 1688, the Seignory of La Noraye (also spelled as: Lanauraie, Lanoraie, Noraye) was united with the Autray Seignory, granted in 1637 to Jean Bourdon who passed it on to his son Jacques Bourdon d'Autray in 1653.

Although the Parish of Saint-Joseph-de-Lanoraie was founded in 1732, it did not really begin to develop until 1831. In 1845, this parish was incorporated as the Parish Municipality of Lanoraie, but abolished two years later in 1847, when it became part of the Berthier County Municipality. In 1855, it was reestablished as the Parish Municipality of Saint-Joseph-de-Lanoraie. In 1848, the Municipality of Lanoraie-d'Autray was formed.

On December 6, 2000, the Parish Municipality of Saint-Joseph-de-Lanoraie and the Municipality of Lanoraie-d'Autray were merged to form the new Municipality of Lanoraie.

== Demographics ==
Historical census populations – Lanoraie
Year	Pop.	±%
2001	3,869	—
2006	4,067	+5.1%
2011	4,447	+9.3%
2016	4,787	+7.6%
2021	5,134	+7.2%
Source: Statistics Canada

Private dwellings occupied by usual residents (2021): 2,123 (total dwellings: 2,199)

Mother tongue (2021):

- English as first language: 1.2%
- French as first language: 95.5%
- English and French as first languages: 1.1%
- Other as first language: 2.1%

== Education ==
The Commission scolaire des Samares operates francophone public schools.

- École de la Source d'Autray

== See also ==
- List of municipalities in Quebec

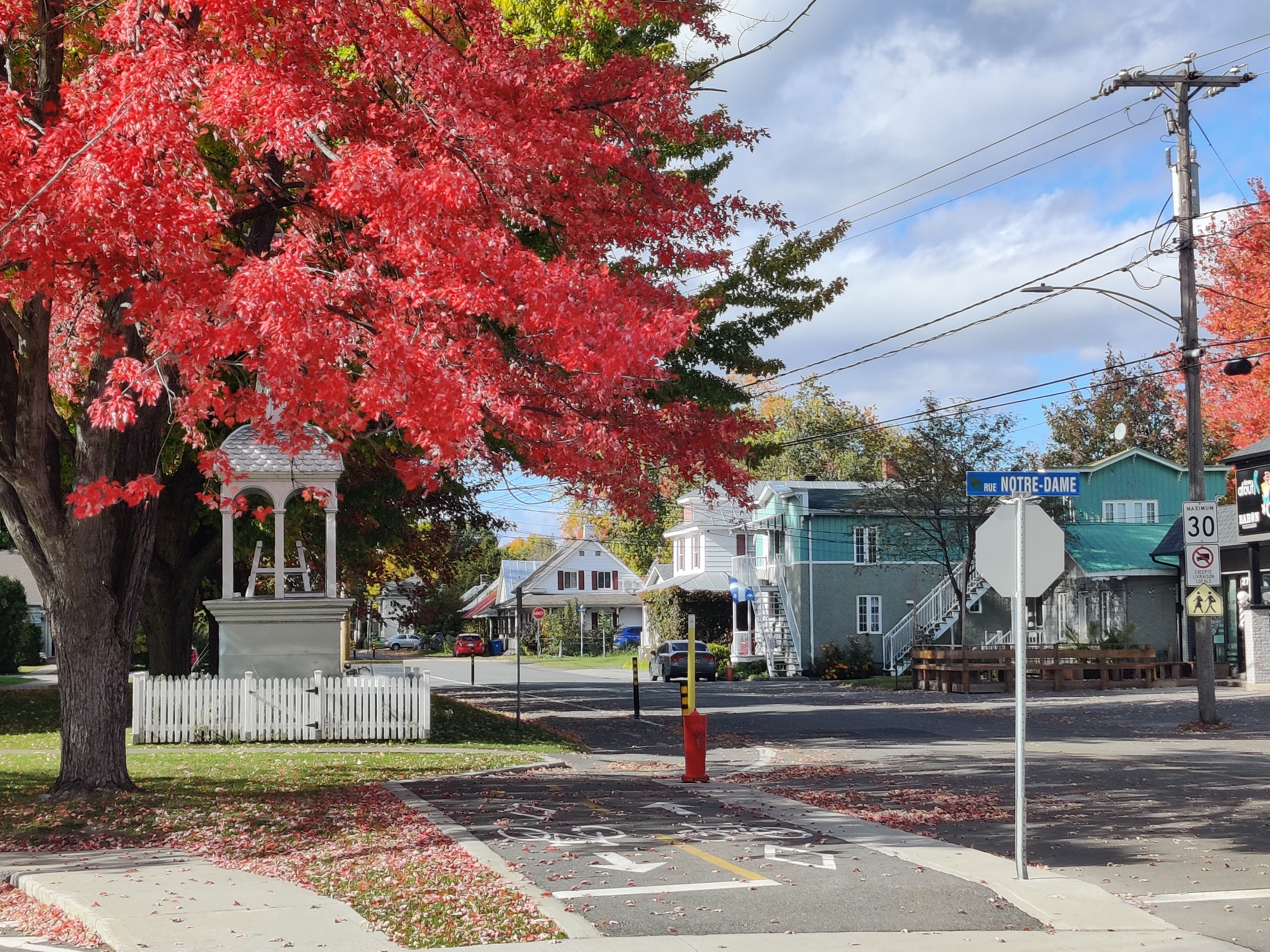
Notre-Dame Street in Oct 2022
