= Manawan =

- First Nations reserve
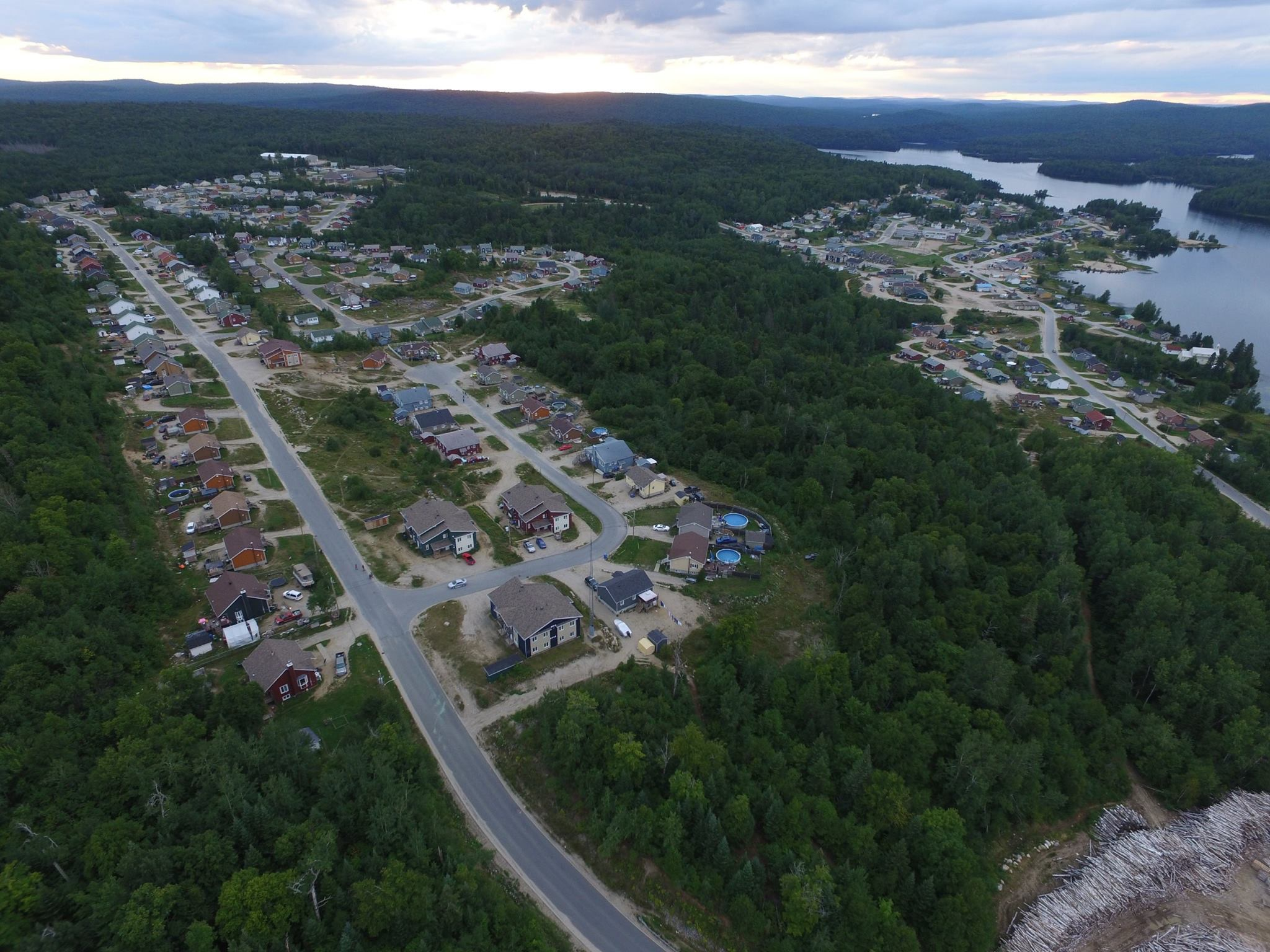

- Location in central Quebec.
- Coordinates: 47°13′21″N 74°23′30″W
- Country: Canada
- Province: Quebec
- Region: Lanaudière
- Regional county: none
- Settled: 1870
- Founded: August 29, 1906 (reserve)

Government
  - Chief: Glenn Dubé
  - Federal riding: Joliette—Manawan
  - Prov. riding: Berthier

Area
  - Land: 8.03 km^{2} (3.10 sq mi)

Population (2021)
  - Total: 2,000
  - Density: 249.2/km^{2} (645/sq mi)
- Time zone: UTC-5 (EST)
  - Summer (DST): UTC-4 (EDT)
- Postal Code: J0K 1M0
- Area code: 819
- Website: www.manawan.com

Manawan (named Manouane until 1991), officially named communauté Atikamekw de Manawan (French for "Atikamekw Community of Manawan"), is a First Nations reserve on the south-western shores of Lake Métabeskéga in the Lanaudière region of Quebec, Canada. It belongs to the Atikamekw of Manawan band of the Atikamekw Nation.

The 5-kilometre (3-mile) by 2-kilometre (1 1/4-mile) reserve is an enclave within the Baie-Atibenne unorganized territory, approximately 72 kilometres (45 mi) north of Saint-Michel-des-Saints. It is accessible by gravel road.

The reserve takes its name from the Manouane River that has its source nearby. The standardized writing of the Atikamekw language spells it as Manawan, and this form was adopted on January 8, 1991. It means "place where they gather eggs".

== Toponymy ==
"Manawan" means "place where we gather eggs" in Atikamekw language. The real name of the location of the village of Manawan is Metapeckeka, which means "where swamps emerge" or "savannah that emerges from a bay".

== Geography ==
The Indian Reserve of Manawan is an enclave within the Baie-Atibenne unorganized territory in Lanaudière, Quebec. It is located at 113 kilometres (70 mi) northeast of Mont-Laurier and it covers an area of 774 hectares (1,910 acres). It is linked by a gravel road to Saint-Michel-des-Saints to the south which is the closest service centre. The main city the closest to the village is Montreal.

== History ==
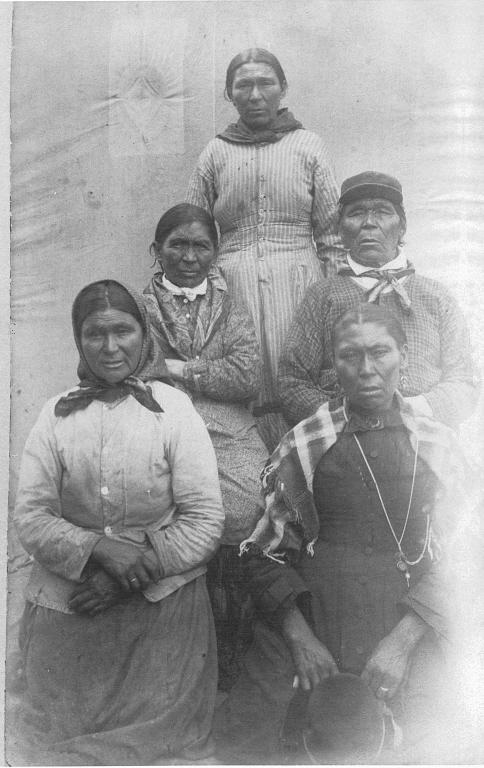
Atikamekw of Manawan circa 1900

At least since 1850 and probably earlier, the shores of Lake Métabeskéga were a gathering place for Atikamekw families from Wemotaci. This location, near their winter hunting grounds, was known in the 19th century as Metapeckeka, meaning "swamp coming from a bay" (from the fact that the lake is often dotted with floating plant debris that winds blew of the banks).

Around 1870, logging companies moved into the area, prompting several families to permanently settle on the site. A year later, the Hudson's Bay Company opened its post. But damming of Kempt, Manawan, and Châteauvert Lakes in the early 1900s inundated the old village. A new village formed downstream at the current site.

Establishing a reserve for themselves proved difficult for the Atikamekw. The repeated requests of Chief Louis Néwashish for this portion of their territory were rebuffed by the Canadian Government, saying that the Maniwaki reserve, created in 1850, was reserved for them. The Atikamekw refused to go and live there. The federal government still declined to establish a reserve, arguing that Wemotaci was also for them. After years of correspondence followed by numerous trips in birch-bark canoe to Ottawa and lengthy negotiations for federal services, the government agreed. On August 29, 1906, the Manouane Reserve was officially founded with 1,906 acres (771 ha) of land and having some 50 inhabitants.

The Hudson's Bay Company general store closed circa 1941. The village experienced further growth in the 1950s when more families settled down as a result of growing forest exploitation and the construction of large dams. In 1973, Manawan was connected by road to Saint-Michel-des-Saints.

=== Land history ===
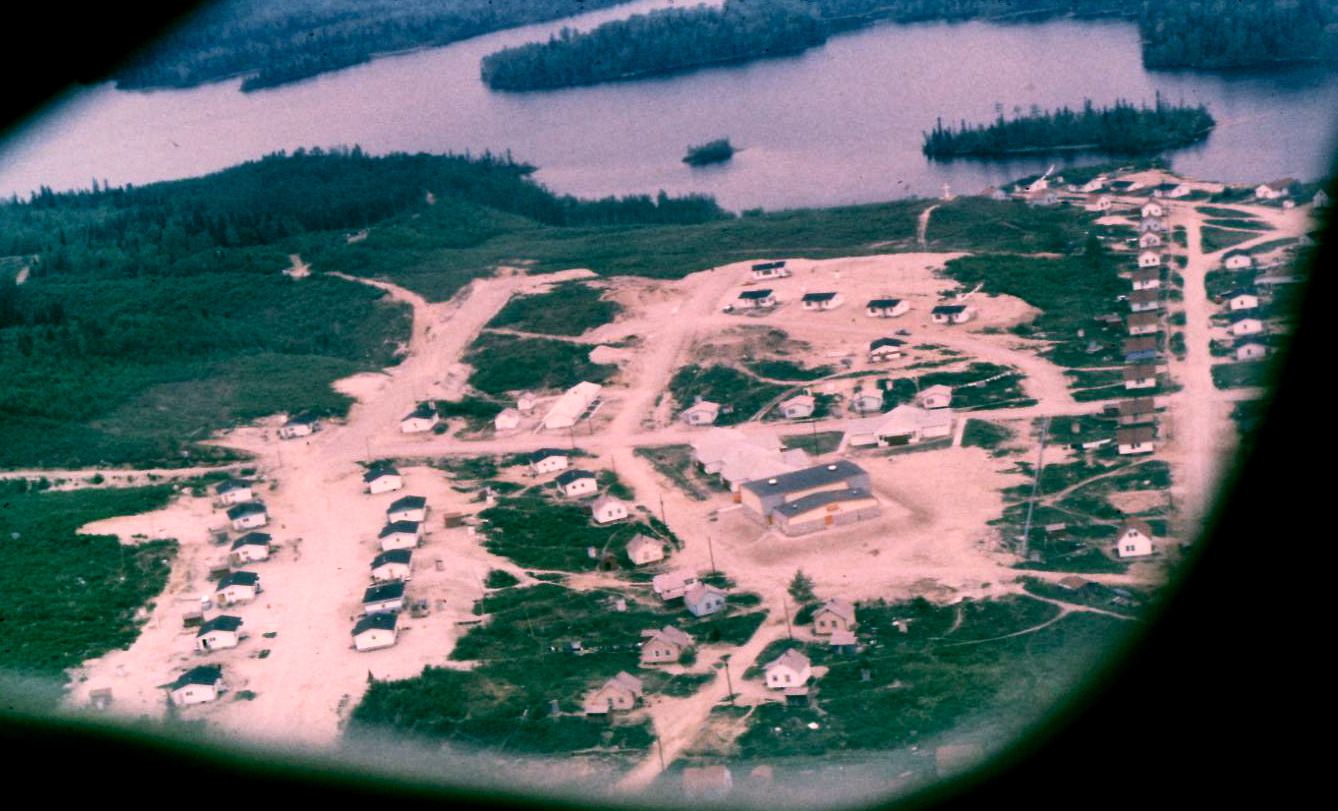
Aerial view of Manawan in 1971

- 1861-01-31: Act of 1861, aside land not exceeding 93,080 hectares (230,000 acres) for the use of Indians.
- 1906-05-25: Surveying land for reserve Manowan. Undivided land. Area: 771.32 hectares (1,906.0 acres).
- 1906-08-29: Order in Council 532, transfer of the management and administration of the Government of Quebec to Government of Canada. Undivided land. Area: 771.32 hectares (1,906.0 acres).

Current Situation

- Lands undivided, land acquired under the 1861 Act Transferring the management and administration of the Government of Quebec to Government of Canada by Order in Council 532 (1906-1908. - 29). Area: 771.32 hectares (1,906.0 acres)

== Demographics ==
Canada census – Manawan community profile

	2011
Population	2073 (12.5% from 2006)
Land area	7.74 km^{2} (2.99 sq mi)
Population density	267.9/km^{2} (694/sq mi)
Median age	19.4 (M: 18.4, F: 20.7)
Private dwellings	407 (total)
Median household income

References: 2011

Historic populations:

- Population in 2021: 2000
- Population in 2016: 2060
- Population in 2011: 2073
- Population in 2001: 1646
- Population in 1996: 1416
- Population in 1991: 1224

Mother tongue:

- English: 0.2%
- French: 2.4%
- Atikamekw: 97.1%
- Other: 0.2%

== Education ==
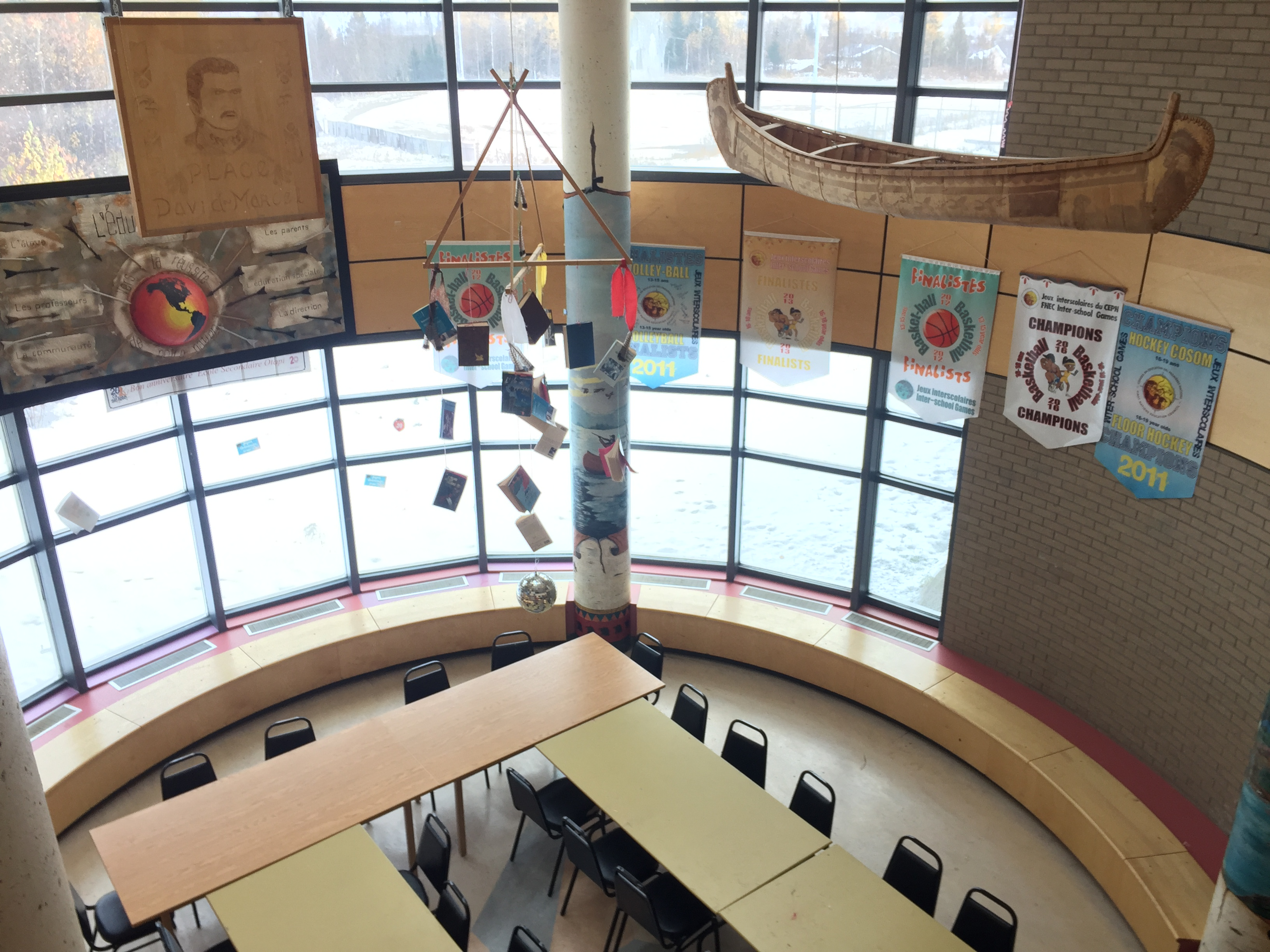
Agora of the Otapi High School

There are 2 schools on the reserve:

- École Simon P. Ottawa (Simon P. Ottawa School), pre-kindergarten to Elementary grade 6
- École secondaire Otapi (Otapi High School), grades Secondary 1 to Secondary 5

== See also ==
- Atikamekw of Manawan
- Conseil de la Nation Atikamekw
- André Quitich
