= Saint-Damien, Quebec =

Saint-Damien
- Parish municipality
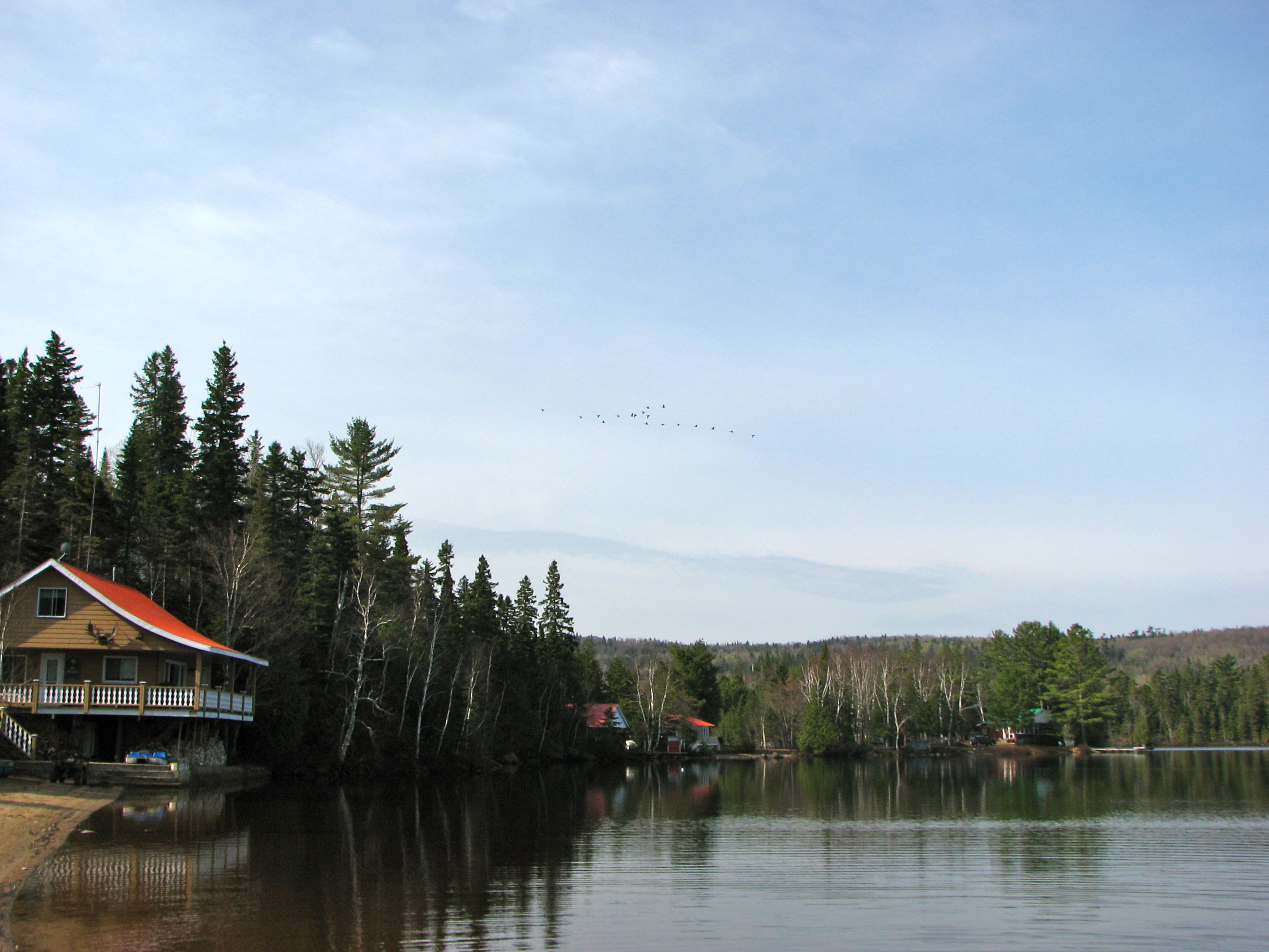
- Lake Gauthier

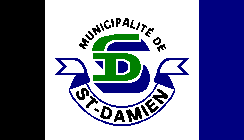
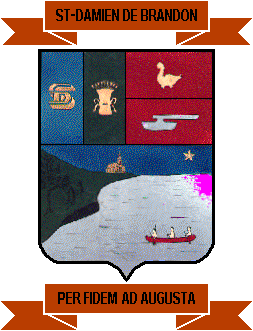
- Flag Coat of arms
- Motto: Per fidem ad Augusta
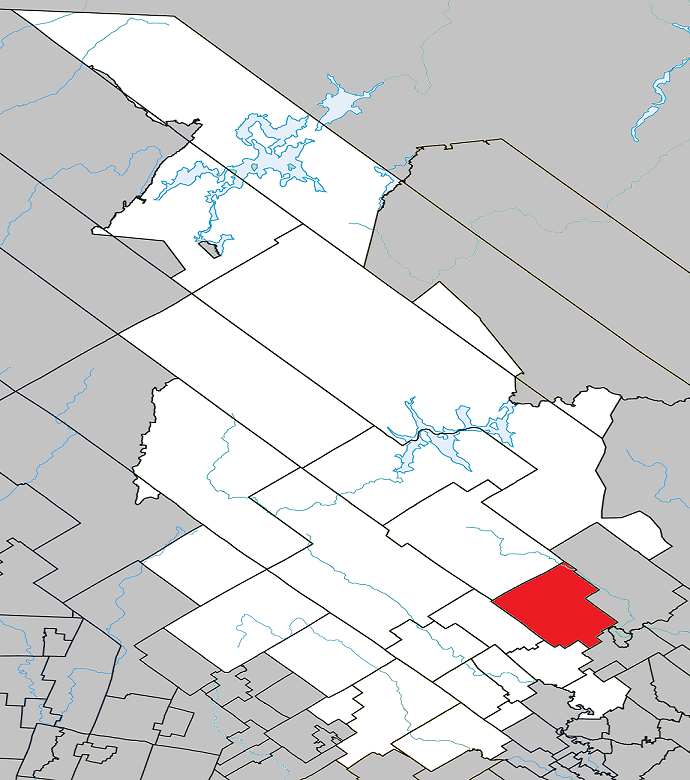
- Location within Matawinie RCM

- Location in central Quebec
- Coordinates: 46°20′N 73°29′W
- Country: Canada
- Province: Quebec
- Region: Lanaudière
- RCM: Matawinie
- Constituted: September 6, 1870

Government
  - Mayor: Pierre Charbonneau
  - Federal riding: Joliette—Manawan
  - Prov. riding: Berthier

Area
  - Total: 268.50 km^{2} (103.67 sq mi)
  - Land: 252.28 km^{2} (97.41 sq mi)

Population (2021)
  - Total: 2,393
  - Density: 9.5/km^{2} (25/sq mi)
  - Pop 2016-2021: ▲14.3%
  - Dwellings: 1,891
- Time zone: UTC−5 (EST)
  - Summer (DST): UTC−4 (EDT)
- Postal code(s): J0K 2E0
- Area code(s): 450, 579, and 354
- Highways: R-347
- Website: www.st-damien.com

Saint-Damien (French pronunciation: [sɛ̃ damjɛ̃]) is a parish municipality of 2,393 inhabitants in Quebec, Canada. It is located in Matawinie Regional County Municipality in the Lanaudière region.

== History ==
The town was founded the 6 September 1870. In French, people from the town are known as damiennois.

== Geography ==
Saint-Damien is located in the middle of Lanaudière region near Saint-Gabriel-de-Brandon municipality, about 100 kilometres (62 mi) north of Montreal, 270 kilometres (170 mi) west of Québec, and 63 kilometres (39 mi) south of Taureau Reservoir. The main street is named "Rue Principale" (meaning, literally, "main street") and it is served by Quebec Route 347 which runs from Quebec Route 158 at Sainte-Geneviève-de-Berthier (2 km west of exit 144 on Autoroute 40) through Saint-Gabriel-de-Brandon, Saint Damien, Sainte-Émélie-de-l'Énergie and Saint-Côme to Québec Route 125 in Notre-Dame-de-la-Merci.

The bordering municipalities of Saint-Damien are, starting from northwest and proceeding clockwise, Saint-Zénon (northwest), Mandeville (northeast, in D'Autray Regional County Municipality), Saint-Gabriel-de-Brandon (southeast, in D'Autray Regional County Municipality), Saint-Jean-de-Matha (south) and Sainte-Émélie-de-l'Énergie (west).

== Demographics ==
Historical Census Data - Saint-Damien, Quebec
Year	Pop.	±%
1881	1,170	—
1891	1,163	−0.6%
1901	1,194	+2.7%
1911	1,274	+6.7%
1921	1,043	−18.1%
1931	924	−11.4%
1941	1,007	+9.0%
1951	1,093	+8.5%
1956	1,065	−2.6%
1961	1,052	−1.2%
1966	931	−11.5%
1971	963	+3.4%
1976	1,126	+16.9%
1981	1,236	+9.8%
1986	1,328	+7.4%
1991	1,505	+13.3%
1996	1,760	+16.9%
2001	1,983	+12.7%
2006	2,178	+9.8%
2011	2,020	−7.3%
2016	2,094	+3.7%
2021	2,393	+14.3%

In the 2021 Census of Population conducted by Statistics Canada, Saint-Damien had a population of 2,393 living in 1,220 of its 1,891 total private dwellings, a change of 14.3% from its 2016 population of 2,094. With a land area of 252.28 km^{2} (97.41 sq mi), it had a population density of 9.5/km^{2} (24.6/sq mi) in 2021.

Canada census – Saint-Damien community profile

	2021	2016	2011
Population	2,393 (+14.3% from 2016)	2,094 (+3.7% from 2011)	2,020 (-7.3% from 2006)
Land area	252.28 km^{2} (97.41 sq mi)	255.87 km^{2} (98.79 sq mi)	255.16 km^{2} (98.52 sq mi)
Population density	9.5/km^{2} (25/sq mi)	8.2/km^{2} (21/sq mi)	7.9/km^{2} (20/sq mi)
Median age	57.2 (M: 58.4, F: 56.0)	56.6 (M: 56.6, F: 56.5)	53.7 (M: 54.3, F: 53.2)
Private dwellings	1,891 (total)	1,759 (total)	1,533 (total)
Median household income	$58,800	$46,541	$41,129

References: 2021 2016 2011

Canada Census Mother Tongue - Saint-Damien, Quebec
Census	Total	French			English			French & English			Other		
Year	Responses	Count	Trend	Pop %	Count	Trend	Pop %	Count	Trend	Pop %	Count	Trend	Pop %
2021	2,395	2,290	▲12.0%	95.6%	30	▲100.0%	1.3%	20	▲100.0%	0.8%	40	▲166.7%	1.7%
2016	2,095	2,045	▲3.5%	97.6%	15	0.0%	0.7%	10	▲100.0%	0.5%	15	▲50.0%	0.7%
2011	2,020	1,975	▼4.6%	97.8%	15	▼25.0%	0.7%	5	▼50.0%	0.2%	10	▼85.7%	0.5%
2006	2,165	2,070	▲8.1%	95.6%	20	▼33.3%	0.9%	10	▼33.3%	0.5%	70	▲ n/a%	3.2%
2001	1,965	1,915	▲12.0%	97.5%	30	▲200.0%	1.5%	15	▲ n/a%	0.8%	0	0.0%	0.0%
1996	1,735	1,710	n/a	98.6%	10	n/a	0.6%	0	n/a	0.0%	0	n/a	0.0%

== Education ==
The Commission scolaire des Samares operates francophone public schools, including:

- École Saint-Coeur-de-Marie

The Sir Wilfrid Laurier School Board operates anglophone public schools, including:

- Joliette Elementary School in Saint-Charles-Borromée
- Joliette High School in Joliette

== Famous people ==
- Marie Jean-Eudes (1897-1981), Canadian nun and botanist
- Raymond Gravel (b. 1952), Canadian politician

== See also ==
- List of parish municipalities in Quebec
