= Saint-Barthélemy, Quebec =

Saint-Barthélemy
- Parish municipality
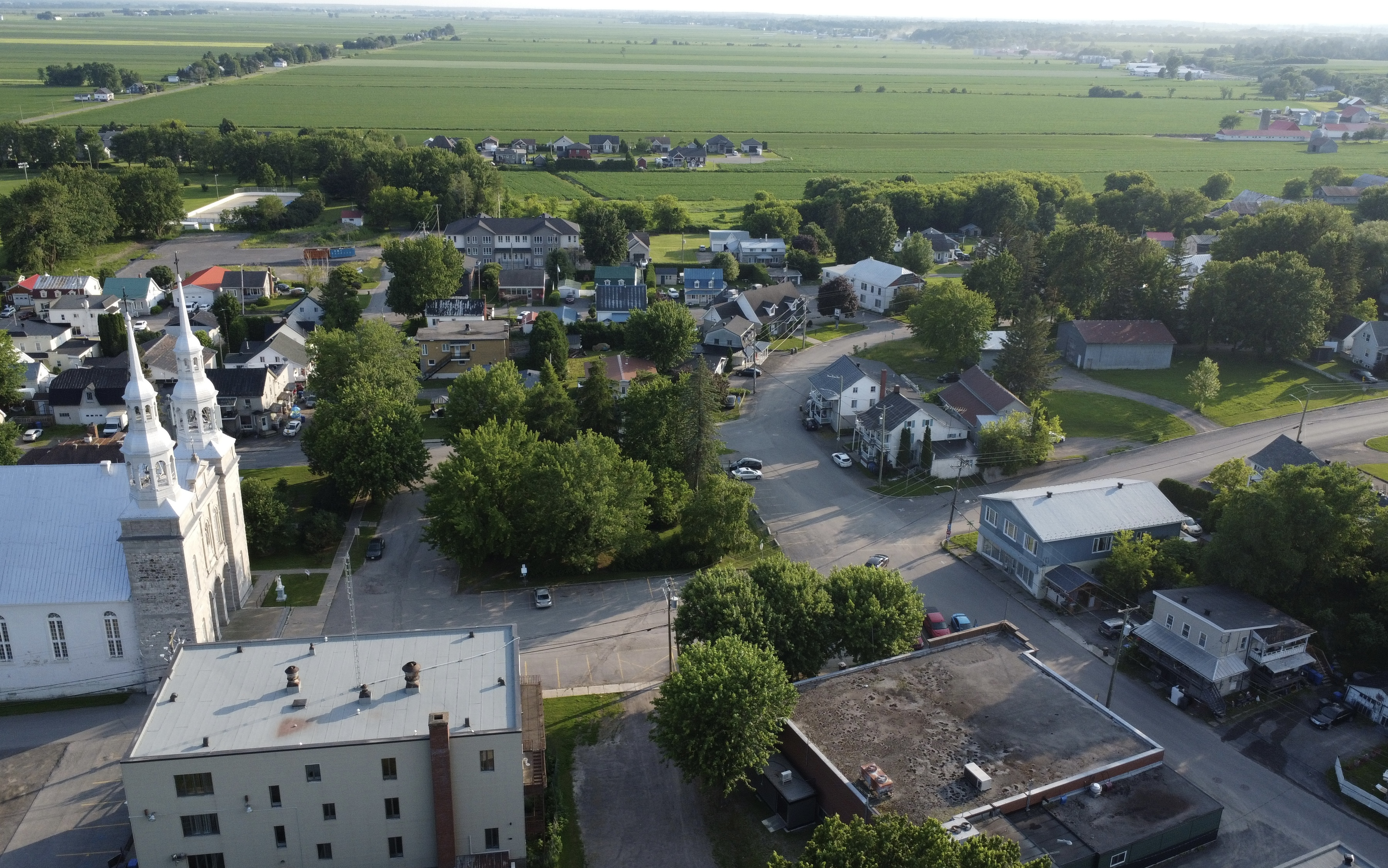

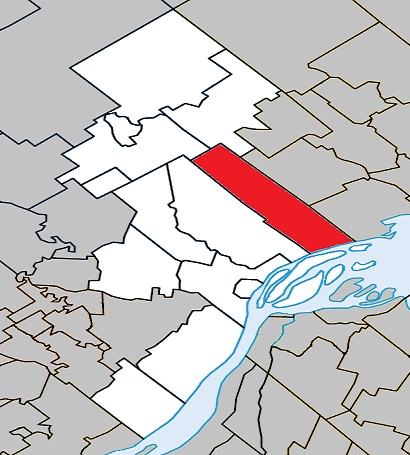
- Location within D'Autray RCM

- Location in central Quebec
- Coordinates: 46°11′N 73°08′W
- Country: Canada
- Province: Quebec
- Region: Lanaudière
- RCM: D'Autray
- Constituted: July 1, 1855

Government
  - Mayor: Robert Sylvestre
  - Fed. riding: Berthier—Maskinongé
  - Prov. riding: Berthier

Area
  - Total: 107.11 km^{2} (41.36 sq mi)
  - Land: 105.36 km^{2} (40.68 sq mi)

Population (2021)
  - Total: 2,087
  - Density: 19.8/km^{2} (51/sq mi)
  - Change 2016-21: ▲7.9%
  - Dwellings: 1,072
- Time zone: UTC−5 (EST)
  - Summer (DST): UTC−4 (EDT)
- Postal code(s): J0K 1X0
- Area codes: 450, 579
- Highways A-40: R-138
- Website: www.saint-barthelemy.ca

Saint-Barthélemy is a parish municipality in the Lanaudière region of Quebec, Canada, and part of the D'Autray Regional County Municipality. A rural community in the St. Lawrence lowlands, the central village is surrounded by fields that stretch all the way to the Saint Lawrence River. By 1895, the municipality was classified as a "post-village ... with several stores, and large trade in flour and lumber." Nowadays, the economy primarily relies on agriculture, tourism, and light industry, with many residents also involved in local businesses that cater to both the community and visitors.

Located near the historic Chemin du Roy, the municipality is also accessible to bike-friendly Route Verte's multi-use trails. For birdwatchers, the lowlands flood every spring, attracting two kinds of migratory geese and "more than fifteen different species of ducks."

== History ==
Erected by canonical decree of the bishop of Quebec in 1827, the municipality covers "the entire seigneury Du Sablé granted in 1739 to Sieur Louis-Adrien Dandonneau," which is why, in 1845, when the municipality was founded, the original parish name was combined with the seigneurial name, and Saint-Barthélemi-de-Dusablé was the result. By 1855, however, the name had been shortened to Saint-Barthélemi and, in 1981, it was altered to Saint-Barthélemy.

== Demographics ==
In the 2021 Census of Population conducted by Statistics Canada, Saint-Barthélemy had a population of 2,087 living in 951 of its 1,072 total private dwellings, a change of 7.9% from its 2016 population of 1,934. With a land area of 105.36 km^{2} (40.68 sq mi), it had a population density of 19.8/km^{2} (51.3/sq mi) in 2021.

Historical Census Data - Saint-Barthélemy, Quebec

Year	Pop.	±%
1861	2,429	—
1871	2,509	+3.3%
1881	2,812	+12.1%
1891	2,527	−10.1%
1901	2,562	+1.4%
1911	2,591	+1.1%
1921	2,382	−8.1%
1931	2,026	−14.9%
1941	2,111	+4.2%
1951	2,105	−0.3%
1956	2,122	+0.8%
1961	2,087	−1.6%

Year	Pop.	±%
1966	1,969	−5.7%
1971	1,981	+0.6%
1976	1,972	−0.5%
1981	1,921	−2.6%
1986	1,906	−0.8%
1991	1,945	+2.0%
1996	2,075	+6.7%
2001	2,000	−3.6%
2006	2,037	+1.8%
2011	1,883	−7.6%
2016	1,934	+2.7%
2021	2,087	+7.9%

Source: Statistics Canada

Mother tongue (2021):

- English as first language: 0.7%
- French as first language: 96.6%
- English and French as first languages: 1.2%
- Other as first language: 1.4%

== Education ==
Commission scolaire des Samares operates francophone public schools, including:

- École Dusablé

The Sir Wilfrid Laurier School Board operates anglophone public schools, including:

- Joliette Elementary School in Saint-Charles-Borromée
- Joliette High School in Joliette

== See also ==
- List of parish municipalities in Quebec
