= Matawinie Regional County Municipality =

Matawinie
- Regional county municipality
- Coordinates: 46°16′N 73°47′W
- Country: Canada
- Province: Quebec
- Region: Lanaudière
- Effective: January 1, 1982
- County seat: Rawdon

Government
  - Type: Prefecture
  - Prefect: Gaétan Morin

Area
  - Total: 10,430.00 km^{2} (4,027.05 sq mi)
  - Land: 9,423.15 km^{2} (3,638.30 sq mi)

Population (2021)
  - Total: 55,500
  - Density: 5.9/km^{2} (15/sq mi)
  - Change 2016-2021: ▲10%
  - Dwellings: 37,357
- Time zone: UTC−5 (EST)
  - Summer (DST): UTC−4 (EDT)
- Area codes: 450 and 579
- Website: www.matawinie.org

Matawinie (French pronunciation: [matawini]) is a regional county municipality in the region of Lanaudière in southwestern Quebec, Canada. Its seat is Rawdon. The population according to the 2021 Canadian Census was 55,500.

== Subdivisions ==
There are 27 subdivisions within the RCM:

Municipalities (14)

- Chertsey
- Entrelacs
- Notre-Dame-de-la-Merci
- Rawdon
- Saint-Alphonse-Rodriguez
- Sainte-Béatrix
- Saint-Côme
- Saint-Donat
- Sainte-Émélie-de-l'Énergie
- Saint-Félix-de-Valois
- Saint-Jean-de-Matha
- Sainte-Marcelline-de-Kildare
- Saint-Michel-des-Saints
- Saint-Zénon

Parishes (1)

- Saint-Damien

Unorganized Territory (12)

- Baie-Atibenne
- Baie-de-la-Bouteille
- Baie-Obaoca
- Lac-Cabasta
- Lac-des-Dix-Milles
- Lac-Devenyns
- Lac-du-Taureau
- Lac-Legendre
- Lac-Matawin
- Lac-Minaki
- Lac-Santé
- Saint-Guillaume-Nord

First Nations reserve (1)
(not associated with RCM)

- Manawan

== Demographics ==
=== Population ===
Canada census – Matawinie community profile

	2021	2016	2011
Population	55,500 (+10.0% from 2016)	50,235 (+1.9% from 2011)	49,516 (-0.4% from 2006)
Land area	9,423.15 km^{2} (3,638.30 sq mi)	9,528.19 km^{2} (3,678.85 sq mi)	9,527.58 km^{2} (3,678.62 sq mi)
Population density	5.9/km^{2} (15/sq mi)	5.3/km^{2} (14/sq mi)	5.2/km^{2} (13/sq mi)
Median age	54.4 (M: 54.4, F: 54.4)	52.6 (M: 52.5, F: 52.8)	49.4 (M: 49.3, F: 49.4)
Private dwellings	37,357 (total) 26,510 (occupied)	35,858 (total)	34,229 (total)
Median household income	$62,000	$32,697	$43,708

References: 2021 2016 2011

Historical Census Data - Matawinie Regional County Municipality, Quebec

Year	Pop.	±%
1991	36,095	—
1996	41,322	+14.5%
1996A	41,314	−0.0%
2001	43,177	+4.5%
2001A	43,093	−0.2%

Year	Pop.	±%
2006	49,717	+15.4%
2011	49,516	−0.4%
2016	50,435	+1.9%
2021	55,500	+10.0%

=== Language ===
French and Atikamekw are the main languages.

Canada Census Mother Tongue - Matawinie Regional County Municipality, Quebec
Census	Total	French			English			French & English			Other		
Year	Responses	Count	Trend	Pop %	Count	Trend	Pop %	Count	Trend	Pop %	Count	Trend	Pop %
2021	55,065	49,620	▲10.7%	90.1%	1,825	▼1.6%	3.3%	605	▲61.3%	1.1%	2,845	▼1.6%	5.2%
2016	49,955	44,835	▲1.9%	89.8%	1,855	▼6.1%	4.0%	375	▲19.0%	0.6%	2,890	▲4.1%	5.8%
2011	49,055	43,990	▼1.1%	89.7%	1,975	▲24.2%	4.0%	315	▲23.5%	0.6%	2,775	▼4.8%	5.7%
2006	49,250	44,490	▲16.3%	90.3%	1,590	▼11.7%	3.2%	255	▼5.6%	0.5%	2,915	▲28.7%	5.9%
2001	42,605	38,270	▲4.9%	89.8%	1,800	▼11.1%	4.2%	270	▼6.9%	0.6%	2,265	▲19.2%	5.3%
1996	40,710	36,495	n/a	89.7%	2,025	n/a	5.0%	290	n/a	0.7%	1,900	n/a	4.7%

== Transportation ==
=== Access Routes ===
Highways and numbered routes that run through the municipality, including external routes that start or finish at the county border:

- Autoroutes
  - None
- Principal Highways
  - R-125
  - R-131
- Secondary Highways
  - R-329
  - R-335
  - R-337
  - R-341
  - R-347
  - R-348
- External Routes
  - None

== See also ==
- List of regional county municipalities and equivalent territories in Quebec
