= Berczy =

Berczy may refer to:

- William Berczy, founder of Berczy Village in Upper Canada
- William Bent Berczy, a farmer, painter and political figure in Upper Canada
- Charles Albert Berczy
- Berczy Village, Ontario, the original settlement that grew to become Markham
- William Berczy Public School, a school named for the founder of the village
