= Sainte-Béatrix =

- Municipality
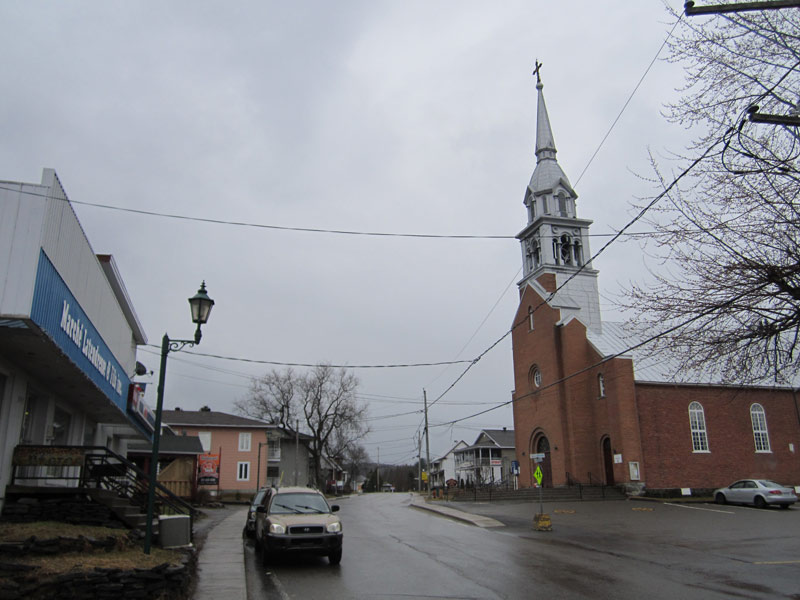

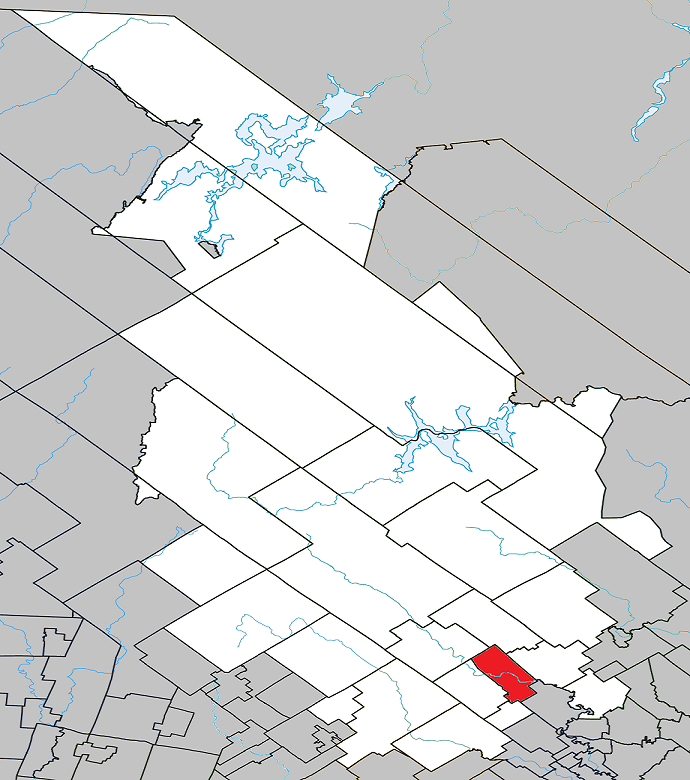
- Location within Matawinie RCM

- Location in central Quebec
- Coordinates: 46°12′N 73°37′W
- Country: Canada
- Province: Quebec
- Region: Lanaudière
- RCM: Matawinie
- Constituted: May 11, 1864

Government
  - Mayor: Sylvie Roberge
  - Federal riding: Joliette—Manawan
  - Prov. riding: Berthier

Area
  - Total: 83.70 km^{2} (32.32 sq mi)
  - Land: 82.96 km^{2} (32.03 sq mi)

Population (2021)
  - Total: 2,170
  - Density: 26.2/km^{2} (68/sq mi)
  - Pop 2016-2021: ▲11%
  - Dwellings: 1,300
- Time zone: UTC−5 (EST)
  - Summer (DST): UTC−4 (EDT)
- Postal code(s): J0K 1Y0
- Area codes: 450 and 579
- Highways: R-337
- Website: www.sainte-beatrix.com

Sainte-Béatrix is a municipality in the Lanaudière region of Quebec, Canada, part of the Matawinie Regional County Municipality.

== History ==
In 1736, Lord Jean d'Ailleboust d'Argenteuil receives a lordship that will bear his name. It won't be until 1864 that the municipality of Sainte-Béatrix be officially created by splitting away from the municipality of Sainte-Mélanie. Louise-Amélie Panet and her husband William Bent Berczy are considered to be the founders of Sainte-Béatrix.

== Demographics ==
=== Population ===
Historical Census Data - Sainte-Béatrix, Quebec

Year	Pop.	±%
1991	1,421	—
1996	1,617	+13.8%
2001	1,608	−0.6%

Year	Pop.	±%
2006	1,788	+11.2%
2011	1,849	+3.4%
2016	1,955	+5.7%

Year	Pop.	±%
2021	2,170	+11.0%

Private dwellings occupied by usual residents: 1041 (total dwellings: 1300)

=== Language ===
Mother tongue:

- English as first language: 2.3%
- French as first language: 95.1%
- English and French as first language: 0.9%
- Other as first language: 1.4%

== Education ==
Commission scolaire des Samares operates francophone public schools, including:

- École Panet

The Sir Wilfrid Laurier School Board operates anglophone public schools, including:

- Joliette Elementary School in Saint-Charles-Borromée
- Joliette High School in Joliette

== Notable people ==
Canadian artist Céline Boucher was born in Sainte-Béatrix.

== See also ==
- List of municipalities in Quebec
