= Angus Glen =

- Neighbourhood
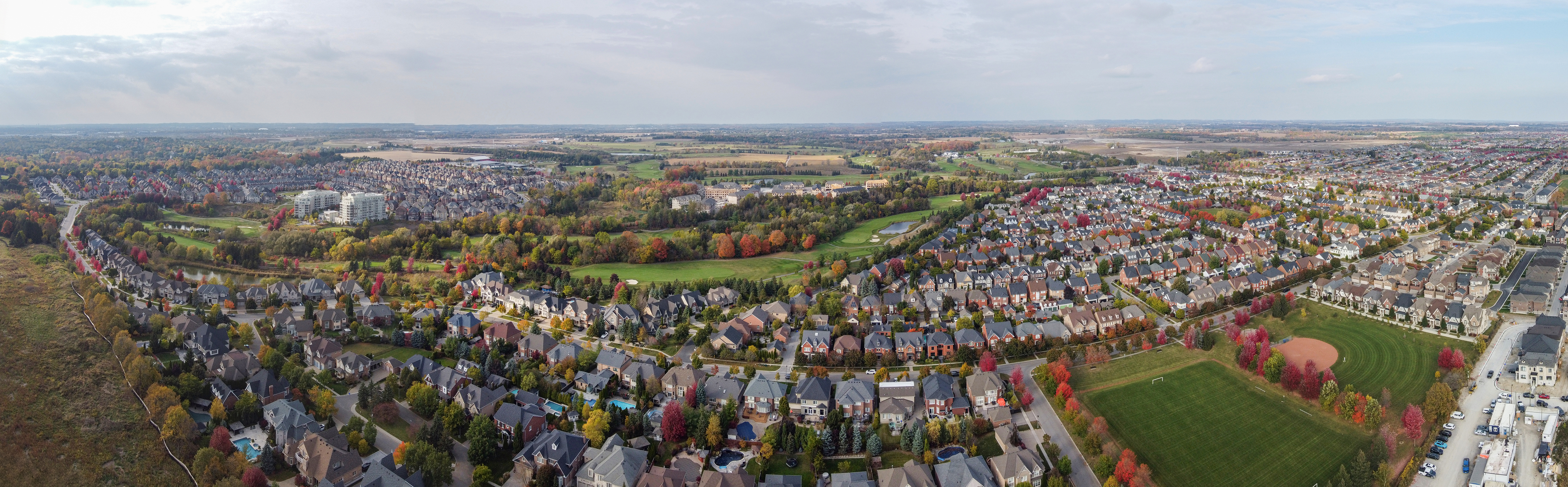
- Aerial view of Angus Glen

- Location of Angus Glen in Markham
- Coordinates: 43°53′34″N 79°19′16″W
- Country: Canada
- Province: Ontario
- Regional municipality: York
- City: Markham
- Established: 1990s (as Subdivision)

Government
  - MP: Paul Chiang (Markham— Unionville)
  - MPP: Billy Pang (Markham—Unionville)
  - Councillor: Amanda Yeung Collucci (Ward 6)

Population (2006)
  - Total: 2,596

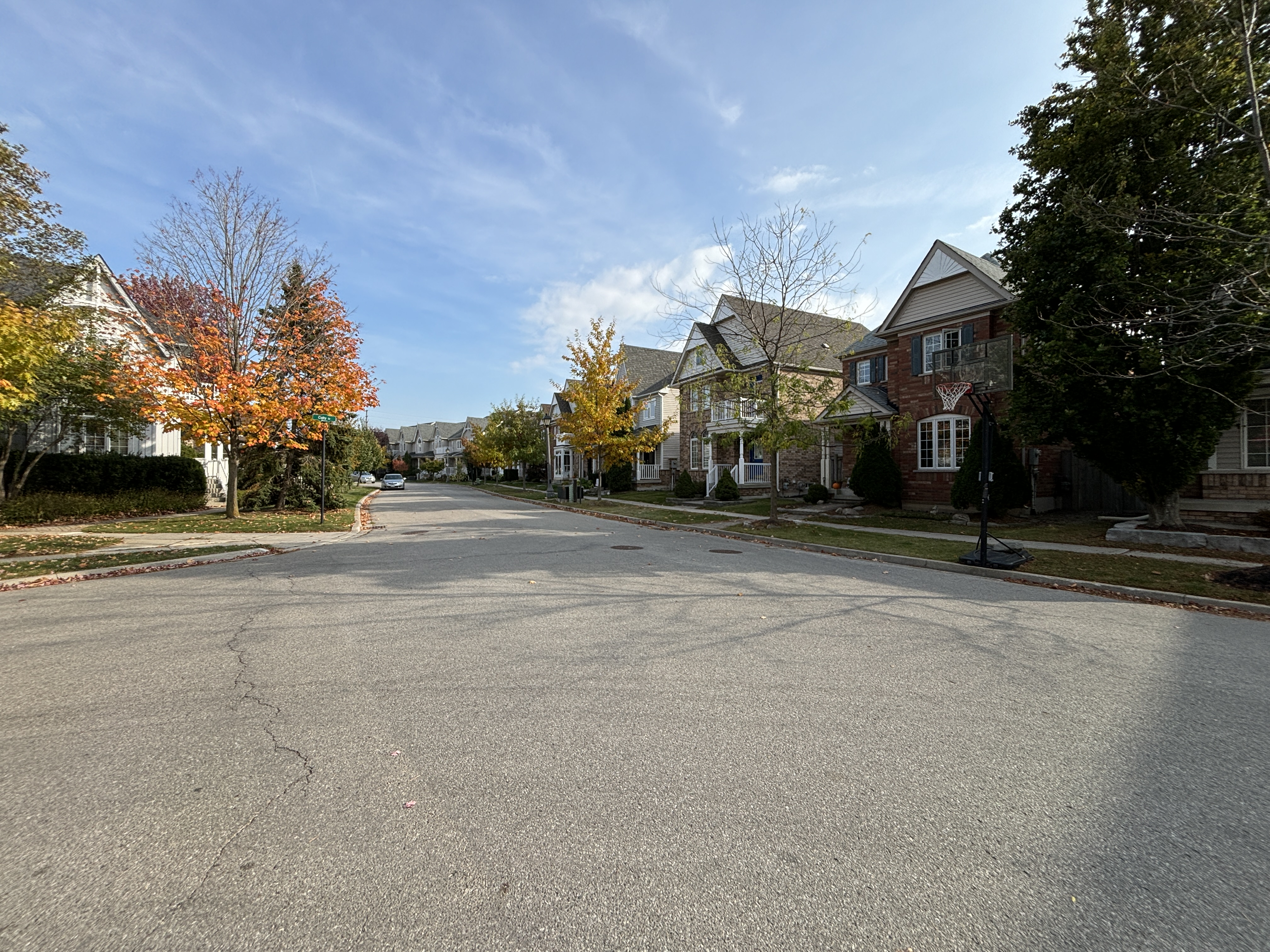
Victorian style housing in Bruce Creek Dr, completed in early 2000

Angus Glen (2006 Population 2,596) is a suburban neighbourhood in the city of Markham. It is roughly bounded by Warden Avenue on the west, Kennedy Road on the east, Sixteenth Avenue on the south, and Major Mackenzie Drive on the north. Developed in the late 1990s, the original Angus Glen East Village, comprising approximately 500 single family homes and townhouses, was planned with the "New Urbanism" concept, to allow for the homes to be designed with the appearance of historic houses, with separate garages on rear laneways. In the mid-2000s the land west of the small creek on the west border of the East Village section commenced development, and is still under construction, known as the West Village. Throughout this period the East Village had a tract of land which had originally been sold to the school board for a possible school. However, the demographic studies could not support a school and after many years of negotiations the developer re-purchased the land in early 2014 and the East Village has had approximately 50 homes under construction, just east of the baseball park and along the north border of the Union Village development (formerly York Downs Golf Club). These homes will increase the East Village's homes to close to 600 and the entire community to approximately 1,100.

Angus Glen is home to the Angus Glen Golf Club. In addition, the William Berczy Historic Cemetery, which contains the graves of the early settlers of the City of Markham, is located to the east.

== Demographics ==
Canada census – Angus Glen community profile

Population
Land area
Population density
Median age
Private dwellings
Median household income

N/A = Not Available

== Nearest places to Angus Glen ==
- Unionville, south
- Victoria Square, north-west
- Cachet, west
- Quartztown, south-east
- Berczy Village, east
- Cashel, north
- Cathedraltown, west

== Public transportation ==
York Region Transit (YRT) provides bus service in Angus Glen:

- Route #8: Kennedy Road (South)
- Route #18: Bur Oak Avenue (East-west): travels the entire east-west Angus Glen Boulevard through the community to the route's end at the Angus Glen Community Centre on Major Mackenzie Drive.
- Route #25: Major Mackenzie Drive (East-west)

== Landmarks/Attractions ==
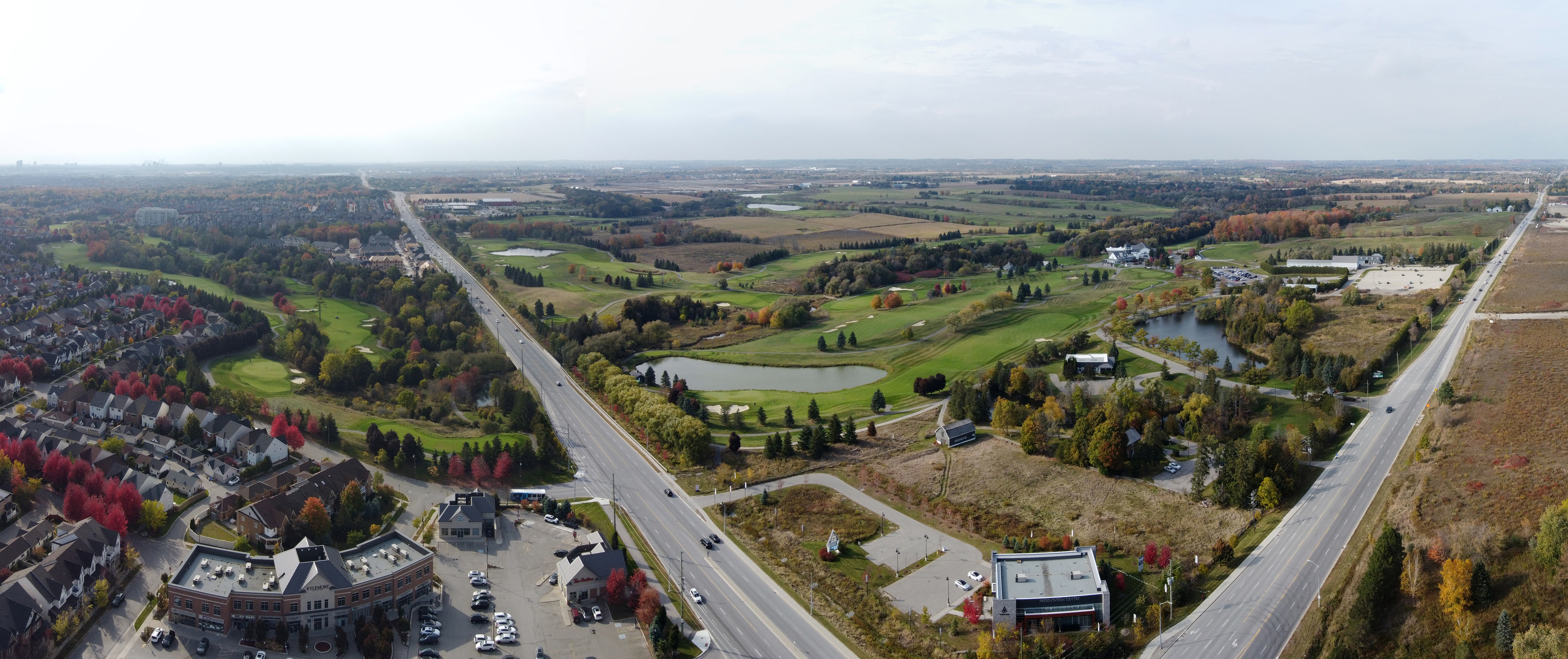
Angus Glen Golf Club

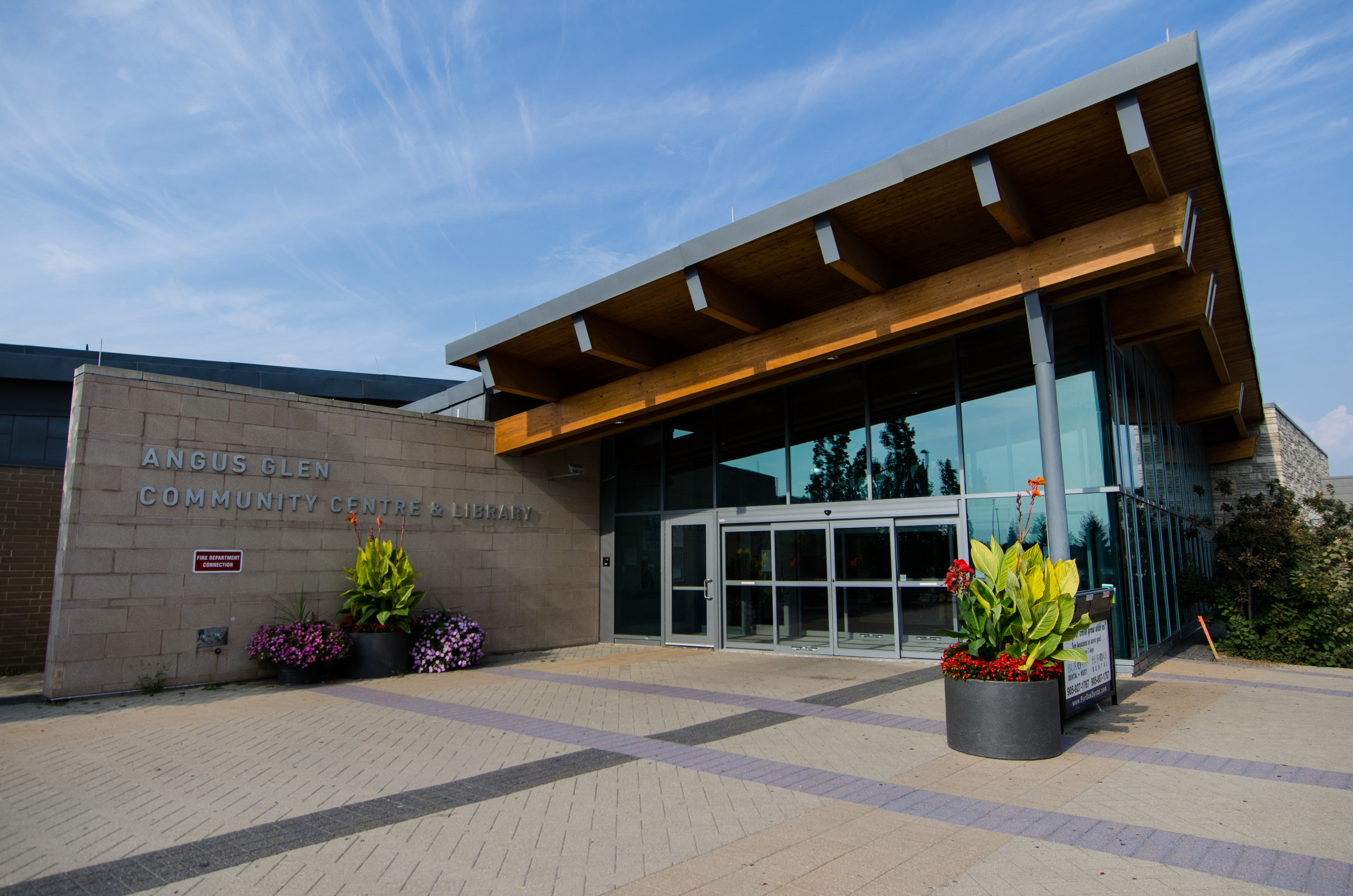
Angus Glen Community Centre

- Angus Glen Community Centre—Arena, Sport Centre, Markham Public Library, Swimming Pool, Conference Centre
- Angus Glen Golf Club - opened in 1995
- York Downs Golf and Golf Club - opened in 1969 after relocating from 1922 course in Toronto
