= Notre-Dame-de-Lourdes, Quebec =

Notre-Dame-de-Lourdes may refer to any of two separate parish municipalities in Quebec:

- Notre-Dame-de-Lourdes, Centre-du-Québec, Quebec, in L'Érable Regional County Municipality
- Notre-Dame-de-Lourdes, Lanaudière, Quebec, in Joliette Regional County Municipality
