= L'Assomption River =

L'Assomption River Rivière L'Assomption
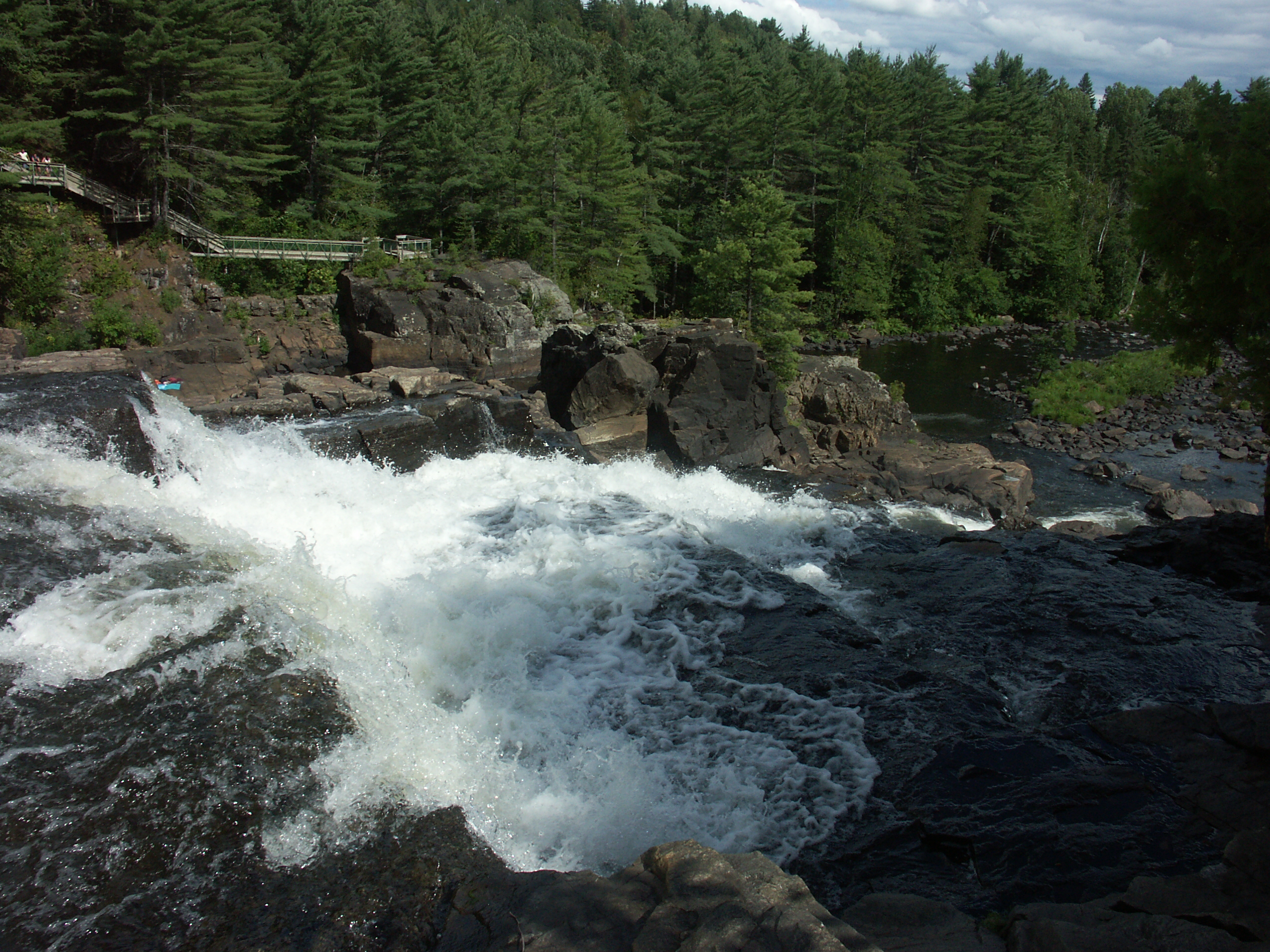
- Assomption River at Chutes Monte-à-Peine Park in Matawinie Regional County Municipality

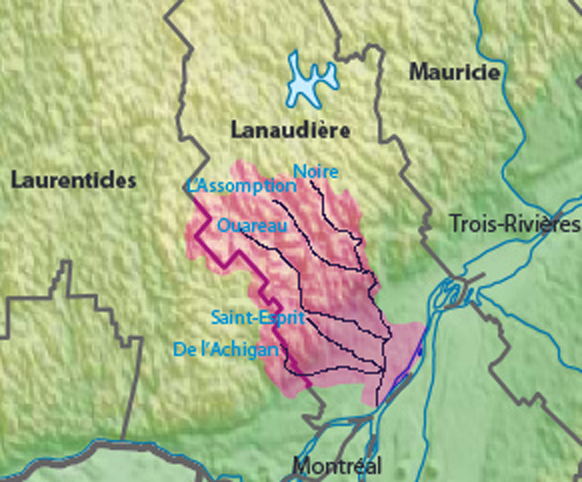

Location
- Country: Canada
- Province: Quebec
- Region: Lanaudière

Physical characteristics
- Source: L'Assomption Lake
  - location: Saint-Guillaume-Nord
  - coordinates: 46°27′45″N 74°03′16″W
- Mouth: Rivière des Prairies
  - location: Repentigny
  - coordinates: 45°42′52″N 73°28′51″W
- Length: 200 km (120 mi)
- Discharge
  - location: Rivière des Prairies

The Assomption River (in French Rivière l'Assomption [ʁivjɛʁ lasɔ̃psjɔ̃], named after the Assumption of Mary) is the most important waterway in the Lanaudière region of Quebec, Canada. It is over 200 kilometres (120 mi) long, and has a drainage basin (watershed) of 4,220 square kilometres (1,630 mi^{2}). Its source is the Mont Tremblant massif. Seven significant rivers flow into the Assomption (de la Boule, Versailles, Noire, la Chaloupe, Ouareau, Saint-Esprit, and Achigan) before it flows into the Rivière des Prairies at Repentigny, Quebec.

About 150,000 people live in the drainage area of this river.

== Geography ==
The L'Assomption River watershed overlaps two natural environments, the Laurentian Mountains and the St-Lawrence lowlands, which cover about a third of the watershed area. Its relief is a uniform plain with some hills—from 0 to 100 metres (0 to 328 ft)—dominated by agricultural lands. The texture of the soil is rather fine and rests on an impermeable argillaceous (clay) base.

The Laurentian Mountains form part of the Canadian Shield. They are separated from the lowlands by a well-defined escarpment that rises about 150 metres (490 ft). This escarpment has many waterfalls. The Laurentians Mountains have an average height of 230 metres (750 ft) in the south and 460 metres (1,510 ft) in the north. And there are even mountains of over 600 metres (2,000 ft) in the Mont Tremblant massif where the L'Assomption River forms.

== Hydrography ==
From north to south the average slope of the river decreases. The steeper slopes of the highlands create a fast current whereas the lowland flats produces a slower flow. Moreover, the river meanders a lot which is especially evident at the town of L'Assomption, almost completely surrounded by a large loop of the river.

The L'Assomption River watershed has 490 lakes of which 24 have a surface area larger than 1 square kilometre (250 acres). Most of the lakes are in the Laurentian highlands.

== Water quality ==
=== Urban and industrial pollution ===
The water quality of the L'Assomption River is seriously affected by the area's social-economic conditions. Since 1950, the situation has been complicated by the urbanization of the river banks, by diversified agriculture, and by industrialisation along the southern portion of the river. Although the source of pollution has changed since 1950, because of strict environmental laws and the use of water purification equipment, water pollution is still not fully curbed.

Over 150,000 people live in the river's watershed in 43 municipalities, of which the most important are Repentigny, Joliette, Le Gardeur, and L'Assomption. In addition, the northern portion of the river's watershed is a popular vacation area, swelling the population by about 45,000 people during the vacation season.

The majority of the municipalities take their drinking water from the river and provide it to more than 100,000 people. The drinking water supply to other residences and country cottages, distributed over approximately 90 percent of the watershed area, comes from water wells.

=== Agricultural pollution ===
Besides the urban and industrial pollution, agricultural pollution also contributes greatly to the environment's contamination.

Agriculture has a dominant position along the river: in 1995 there were 1,305 producers with 60,221 hectares (148,810 acres) under cultivation and possessing 73,563 animals.

Agricultural pollution takes several forms: direct pollution (discharge of manure directly in the rivers) and diffused pollution (infiltration of fertilizer products in the groundwater). Diffused pollution is difficult to control because it has a multitude of sources throughout the whole region. Yet without a solution to this problem the water quality of the river will never have the desired quality.

=== Drainage basin watercourses ===
Order	Label	Mouth	Coordinates	Length (km)	Source	Coordinates	Region
1	L'Assomption River	Rivière des Prairies	45.71444444°N 73.48083333°W	200	L'Assomption Lake	46.4625°N 74.054444°W	Lanaudière
2	L'Achigan River	L'Assomption River	45.84055°N 73.44583°W	83.8	L'Achigan Lake	45.923988°N 73.950733°W	Lanaudière
3	Jourdain River	L'Achigan River	45.831666666667°N 73.858611111111°W	19.4	Duquette Lake	45.847596°N 73.986294°W	Laurentides
4	Abercromby River	L'Achigan River	45.862222222222°N 73.886666666667°W	10.8	Connely Lake	45.890648°N 73.96662°W	Laurentides
5	Beauport River	L'Achigan River	45.889722222222°N 73.868888888889°W	20	Lac de la Crosse	46.012824°N 73.872441°W	Laurentides
6	La Petite Rivière	L'Achigan River	45.850833333333°N 73.771388888889°W	13	Saint-Calixte	45.850909°N 73.771444°W	Laurentides
7	Saint-Esprit River	L'Assomption River	45.861388888889°N 73.443055555556°W	90.4	Huard Lake	46.014012°N 73.812306°W	Lanaudière
8	Saint-George Creek	L'Assomption River	45.9035°N 73.437°W	19.2	Saint-Alexis	45.9035°N 73.437°W	Lanaudière
9	Ouareau River	L'Assomption River	45.94°N 73.4075°W	80	Ouareau Lake	46.28416°N 74.14306°W	Lanaudière
10	Burton River	Ouareau River	46.073888888889°N 73.846388888889°W	16.9	Racette Lake	46.08123°N 73.999314°W	Lanaudière; Laurentides
11	Jean-Venne River	Ouareau River	46.102222222222°N 73.8575°W	20.9	Lac des Îles	46.112507°N 74.020144°W	Lanaudière
12	Kenny River	Jean-Venne River	46.128333333333°N 73.938055555556°W	10.4	Heroux Lake	46.167139°N 73.992382°W	Lanaudière
13	Beaulne River	Ouareau River	46.203888888889°N 73.901388888889°W	9.2	Beaulne Lake	46.193574°N 74.003582°W	Lanaudière
14	Dufresne River	Ouareau River	46.265277777778°N 73.987777777778°W	29.6	Dufresne Lake	46.202595°N 74.220213°W	Lanaudière; Laurentides
15	Rouge River	Ouareau River	45.976388888889°N 73.476111111111°W	56.5	Couture Lake	46.172008°N 73.781444°W	Lanaudière
16	Blanche River	Rouge River	46.028611111111°N 73.63°W	17.8	Lac des Français	46.138178°N 73.620824°W	Lanaudière
17	Le Grand Ruisseau	Rouge River	46.018055555556°N 73.544166666667°W	15.1	Sainte-Mélanie	46.147722°N 73.534946°W	Lanaudière
18	Trudel River	Ouareau River	46.119722222222°N 73.85°W	7.6	Chertsey Lake	46.132314°N 73.814338°W	Lanaudière
19	Nord River	Ouareau River	46.196111111111°N 73.891666666667°W	6.5	Lac du Pin Rouge	46.239342°N 73.882407°W	Lanaudière
20	Versailles River	L'Assomption River	46.279722222222°N 73.790555555556°W	12.5	spring	46.256063°N 73.898856°W	Lanaudière
21	Grande rivière Swaggin	L'Assomption River	46.321111111111°N 73.841944444444°W	8.7	Lac des Cèdres	46.309754°N 73.939661°W	Lanaudière
22	Petite rivière Swaggin	Grande rivière Swaggin	46.318611111111°N 73.8575°W	12.6	Vauvert Lake	46.377806°N 73.967532°W	Lanaudière
23	McGee River	L'Assomption River	46.370277777778°N 73.881666666667°W	14.4	Marguerite Lake	46.399481°N 74.056659°W	Lanaudière
24	Lavigne River	L'Assomption River	46.383888888889°N 73.897222222222°W	16.9	St-Amour Lake	46.511624°N 73.914802°W	Lanaudière
25	Rivière de la Boule	L'Assomption River	46.273055555556°N 73.758055555556°W	14.7	Laré Lake	46.375985°N 73.780914°W	Lanaudière
26	Noire River, Matawinie	L'Assomption River	46.206388888889°N 73.562222222222°W	52.6	Lemieux Lake	46.54639°N 73.75333°W	Lanaudière
27	Blanche River	Noire River, Matawinie	46.248055555556°N 73.583888888889°W	10.8	Lac à Canards	46.254216°N 73.680872°W	Lanaudière
28	Leprohon River	Noire River, Matawinie	46.324722222222°N 73.638333333333°W	16	small lake	46.349062°N 73.735735°W	Lanaudière
29	Crique à David	Noire River, Matawinie	46.314136°N 73.484489°W	17	Lac à la Pluie	46.420118°N 73.633728°W	Lanaudière
30	Ruisseau du Point du Jour	L'Assomption River	45.836666666667°N 73.415555555556°W	20.6	Lanoraie	45.987099°N 73.310163°W	Lanaudière

== List of towns crossed ==
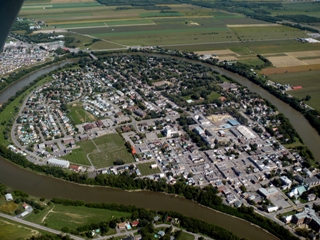
The large meander of the L'Assomption River at the Town of L'Assomption

- Saint-Côme
- Saint-Alphonse-Rodriguez
- Sainte-Béatrix
- Saint-Jean-de-Matha
- Saint-Félix-de-Valois
- Sainte-Mélanie
- Saint-Ambroise-de-Kildare
- Notre-Dame-de-Lourdes
- Notre-Dame-des-Prairies
- Saint-Charles-Borromée
- Joliette
- Saint-Thomas
- Saint-Paul
- L'Épiphanie
- L'Assomption
- Repentigny
- Charlemagne
