= Cashel, Markham =

Cashel
- Unincorporated community
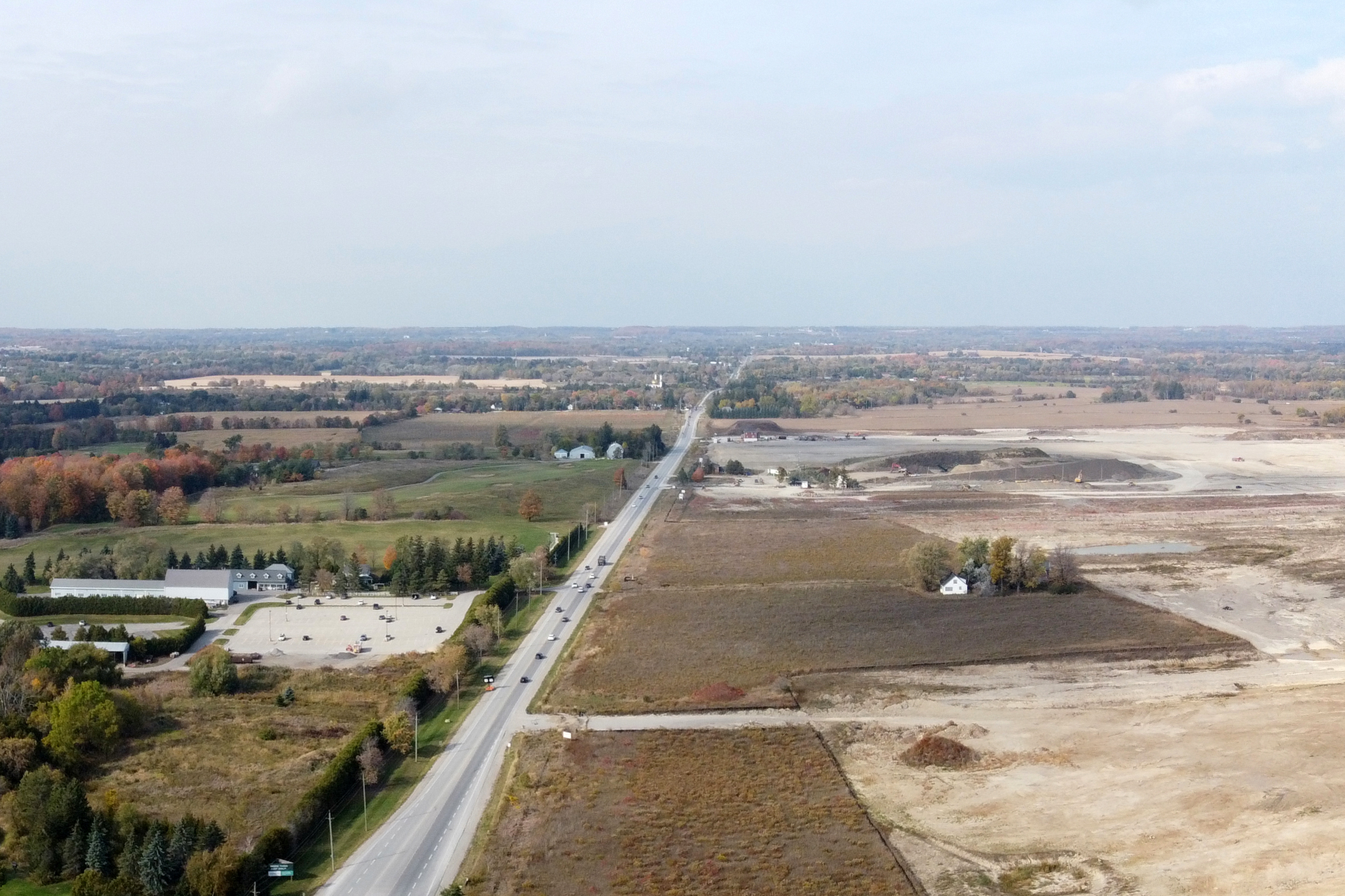
- Aerial view of Cashel in 2023, some of the land being prepared to develop housing
- Interactive map of Cashel
- Coordinates: 43°54′56″N 79°19′21″W
- Country: Canada
- Province: Ontario
- Regional municipality: York
- City: Unionville
- Elevation: 222 m (728 ft)
- Time zone: UTC-5 (EST)
  - Summer (DST): UTC-4 (EDT)
- Area codes: 905 and 289
- NTS Map: 030M14
- GNBC Code: FAPGL

Cashel, Ontario is a small hamlet situated in Unionville, Ontario located at the intersection of Elgin Mills Road and York Regional Road 67. Originally it was called Crosby Corners after John Crosby (born 1797), the village's first store owner, who came originally from New York State. The name was changed to Cashel in 1851 with the opening of its first post office (located at southwest corner of Major Mackenzie and McCowan Road). It was likely named after Cashel in Ireland. In 1851 the community had a sawmill, cobbler shop, blacksmith shop, wagon shop, inn and tavern, Masonic Lodge, and Presbyterian church. In 1890 Peaches United Church was built on land from farmer Thomas Peach at 10762 McCowan Road. The church is a historic site and not operating since the 1960s to 1970s, but cemetery remains in active use. The east west sideroad along the church was locally called Peaches (Peach's) Sideroad or otherwise known as Elgin Mills Road.

There are few dwellings located at the site, most of them near York Regional Road 3, the western boundary of this community. Other parts of the community is mainly farmlands. Cashel's northern boundary is the town of Whitchurch–Stouffville. The community is home to the Markham Fairgrounds.

The only reminder of Cashel is the Asa Henry Summerfeldt's 1860s British American Inn but built around 1851 by Robert McCormick opened by, now a private residence and before as Roadside Antiques.

== Nearby communities ==
- Stouffville, north
- Quartztown, south
- Historical Village of Markham, south-east
- Angus Glen, south-west
- Victoria Square, west
- Uxbridge, east
