= Louise-Amélie Panet =

French Canadian artist, educator and writer (1789-1862)

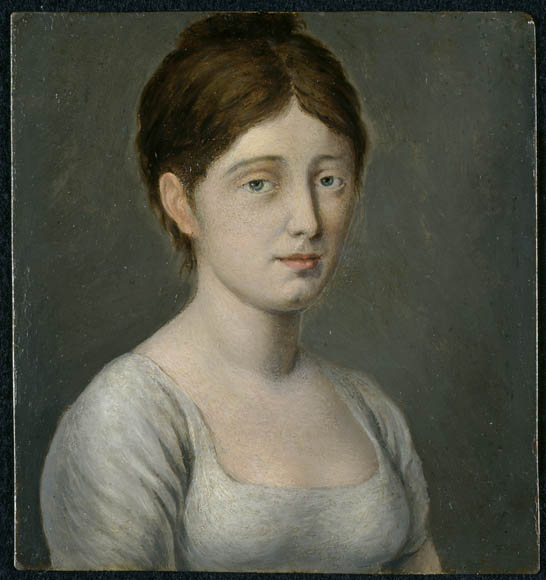
- Louise-Amélie Panet, 1800–1810, painted by the subject's father-in-law, William Berczy
- Born: January 27, 1789; Quebec City, Province of Quebec
- Died: March 24, 1862 (aged 73); Sainte-Mélanie, Province of Canada
- Resting place: St-John's Anglican Cemetery in Kildare
- Education: École des Ursulines, Quebec, Jeanne-Charlotte Allamand
- Known for: artist, writer
- Spouse: William Bent Berczy (1819-1862)

Louise-Amélie Panet (January 27, 1789 – March 24, 1862) was a French Canadian artist, educator and writer living in Lower Canada.

== Life ==
The daughter of judge Pierre-Louis Panet and Marie-Anne Cerré, she was born in Quebec City and was educated with the Quebec Ursulines and in Montreal. She continued her studies in art with Jeanne-Charlotte Allamand. In 1819, she married William Bent Berczy, Allamand's son. The couple moved to Amherstburg in Upper Canada and then to Quebec City. In 1832, the couple inherited the seigneury of Ailleboust and moved there.

Panet died in Sainte-Mélanie at the age of 73.

Her work is included in the collections of the Musée national des beaux-arts du Québec, the Royal Ontario Museum, the Université de Montréal and the Montreal Public Library.

Her poem Quelques traits particuliers Aux saisons du Bas Canada Et aux moeurs De l'habitant de ses Campagnes Il y a quelques quarante ans Mis en vers was republished in 2000.

Portraits of Panet by her father-in-law William Berczy are in the collections of the National Archives of Canada and the Royal Ontario Museum.

The public library in Sainte-Mélanie is named in her honour.
