= William Bent Berczy =

Canadian politician (1791–1873)

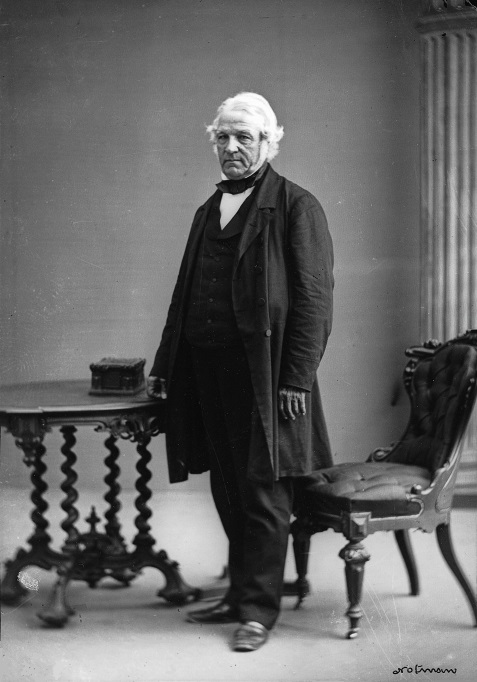
- Berczy in Montreal in 1862

Member of the Legislative Assembly of Upper Canada for Kent County, Ontario
- In office 1828 – 1834

Personal details
- Born: January 6, 1791 London, Great Britain
- Died: December 9, 1873 (aged 82) Sainte-Mélanie-d'Ailleboust, Quebec, Canada
- Spouse: Louise-Amélie Panet (m. 1819)
- Relations: Charles Albert Berczy (brother); Pierre-Louis Panet (father-in-law)
- Parent(s): William Berczy (father); Jeanne-Charlotte Allamand (mother)
- Occupation: Farmer, painter, politician

Military service
- Allegiance: Upper Canada; Lower Canada
- Branch/service: Canadian Militia
- Years of service: c. 1812; 1845–1863
- Rank: Colonel
- Unit: Canadian Chasseurs; 8th Military District
- Battles/wars: War of 1812; Battle of Crysler's Farm

William Bent Berczy (January 6, 1791 – December 9, 1873) was a farmer, painter and political figure in Upper Canada.

== Life ==
=== Early years ===
He was born in London, England in 1791, the son of German immigrants William Berczy and Jeanne-Charlotte Allamand, and came to old York County in Upper Canada with his family in 1794. He grew up in York (now Toronto) (1794-1798, 1802-1804), Montreal (1798-1802, 1804-1812) and Quebec City (1804-1812) - wherever his father's development work required the family to relocate.

=== War of 1812 and farming ===
He served in the Corps of Canadian Chasseurs during the War of 1812 and was at the Battle of Crysler's Farm. From 1818 to 1832, he lived on and off on a property near Sandwich (now Windsor), where he grew tobacco.

=== Politics ===
From 1828 to 1834, he represented Kent in the Legislative Assembly of Upper Canada from the 9th to 11th Parliament. Despite representing Kent, Berczy was residing mostly at York during legislative sitting or in Sainte-Mélanie in then Lower Canada after 1832.

=== Move to Lower Canada and later years ===
In 1832, he settled on the property at Sainte-Mélanie-d'Ailleboust of his wife, Louise-Amélie Panet (married 1819), who had inherited it from her father, seigneur Pierre-Louis Panet. Berczy was lieutenant-colonel in the Lower Canada with the 8th Military District, Canadian Militia unit based in Berthier, Quebec from 1845 to 1863, reaching the rank of colonel.

He died in Sainte-Mélanie-d'Ailleboust, Quebec in 1873, predeceased by his wife in 1863 and brother Charles Albert Berczy in 1858. Berczy and Panet died without having any children. He is buried at St-John's Anglican Cemetery in Kildare.

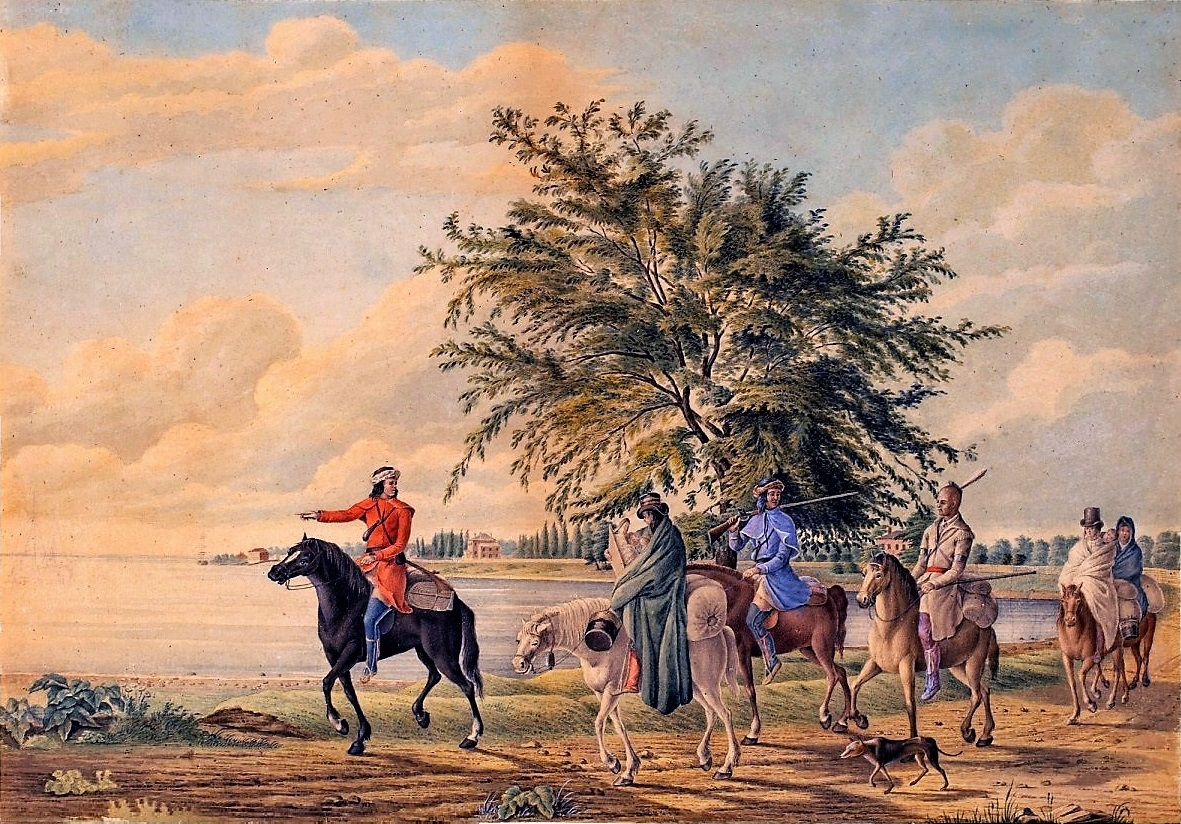
Huron Indians Leaving their Residence near Amherstburg, Upper Canada, on a Hunting Excursion

== Paintings ==
Like his father he was a painter. Two paintings by Berczy hang in the National Gallery of Canada, Huron Indians leaving residence near Amherstburg and Blessing of the Fields.
