= Charles Albert Berczy =

Canadian pioneer (1794–1858)

Charles Albert Berczy (August 22, 1794 – June 8, 1858) was the son of pioneer William Berczy, later as businessman and civic official in Toronto.

== Early years ==
Charles Albert was born in Newark, Upper Canada in 1794 to William and his wife Jeanne-Charlotte Allamand. Charles moved with his family to Montreal after a brief stay in York, Upper Canada in 1794.

In Montreal, Charles worked at the British Commissary General as a clerk and later as acting Deputy Assistant Commissary General (1814–1816).

In 1818, he moved back to Upper Canada and began a business selling tobacco with his brother William Bent Berczy in Amherstburg.

== Later years ==
His public life began with his appointment as Justice of the Peace for the Essex area in 1826. He moved to Toronto following his appointment as Post Office Surveyor and Inspector of Toronto (1835–1838), and later as the city's Post Master (1838–1853). Both appointments were the result of his close ties with Sir Francis Bond Head, the Lieutenant Governor of Upper Canada.

In Toronto, Charles further joined the ranks of the city's business elites. During his time in Toronto, he held such positions as:

- Director of the Bank of Upper Canada (1840–1843)
- President of the Toronto Building Society (est. 1846)
- Co-Founder and Shareholder of Toronto, Simcoe & Lake Huron Union Railroad (later as Northern Railway of Canada)
- Director and President of the Consumer' Gas Light and Water Company (1848–1856)

== Personal life ==
During his stay in Amherstburg, Berczy courted Ann Eliza Finch and married her on June 21, 1828. They had one son and seven daughters.

Towards the end however, Charles Albert Berczy's life began to unravel and as a result, he decided to end his own life in 1858 in Toronto (and based on records buried at St. James Cemetery Berczy was survived by his daughter Charlotte De Moll Berczy (1830-1909), who married James Knight Goold and died in Brantford, Ontario.

== See also ==
- William Bent Berczy
