= L'Assomption Lake =

Lake in Lanaudière, in Quebec, Canada

- Lac l'Assomption (French)
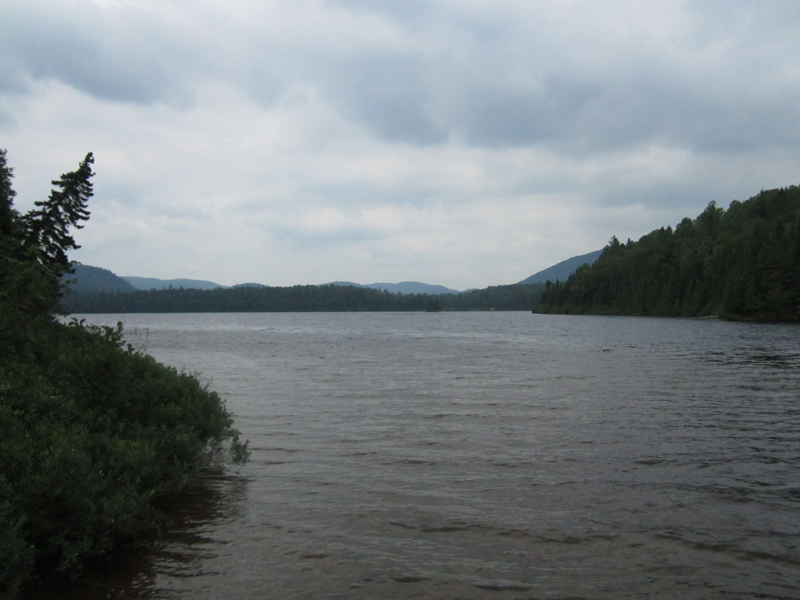
- View of Lake L'Assomption

- Location within Quebec
- Coordinates: 46.460978°N 74.052084°W
- Primary outflows: L'Assomption River
- Surface elevation: 300 metres (980 ft)

L'Assomption Lake (in French: Lac de l'Assomption) is a lake located in the Mont-Tremblant National Park (sector of L'Assomption), in the Municipality of Saint-Guillaume-Nord, in Matawinie Regional County Municipality, in the administrative region of Lanaudière, in Quebec, in Canada.

== Leisure ==
The lake is surrounded by a cycle path made of rock dust over a distance of seven kilometers.

== Toponymy ==
The toponym "Lac de L'Assomption" was formalized on December 5, 1968, at the Place name bank of the Commission de toponymie du Québec.

== See also ==
- List of lakes in Canada
