= Céline Boucher =

Canadian artist (born 1945)

- Born: 1945 (age 79–80); Sainte-Béatrix, Quebec, Canada
- Known for: Painter; Sculptor; Graphic artist

Céline Boucher (born 1945) is a Canadian artist working in the fields of painting, drawing and sculpture.

== Biography ==
Boucher was born in 1945 in Sainte-Béatrix, Quebec.

== Collections ==
- Comme un oiseau, painting, 1983, Musée national des beaux-arts du Québec
