= Bonaventure Panet =

Canadian politician (1765–1846)

Member of the Legislative Assembly of Lower Canada for Leinster
- In office 1792–1810

Personal details
- Born: July 27, 1765 Montreal, Canada
- Died: March 12, 1846 (aged 80)

Bonaventure Panet (July 27, 1765 – March 12, 1846) was a businessman and politician in Lower Canada.

== Background ==
Panet was born in Montreal in 1765, the son of Pierre Panet, who was a lawyer and a judge, and Marie-Anne Trefflé. He was one of the 17 children born to the family, six of whom died in infancy.

He studied at Montreal's Collège Saint-Raphaël. He then moved to Quebec where he set up in business as a merchant at L'Assomption.

In 1786, he married his cousin Marguerite, the daughter of Louis Dunière. He died at L'Assomption in 1846.

== Political career ==
Panet was elected to the 1st Parliament of Lower Canada for Leinster in 1792 and was reelected in 1796. His cousin, Jean-Antoine Panet, was elected as the first speaker for the assembly. His brother Pierre-Louis and father-in-law were also members of the legislative assembly. The former was elected MP for Cornwallis in the same year Panet was elected in his district.

Panet was elected again for Leinster in 1809; the assembly was dissolved by Governor James Henry Craig in 1810 and Panet did not run for elected office again. He served as captain in the militia during the War of 1812 and was promoted to major in 1818. Panet was named justice of the peace for Montreal district in 1821 and was also named to various commissions.
