= Jeanne-Charlotte Allamand =

Canadian artist (1760–1839)

- Born: 16 April 1760; Lausanne, Switzerland
- Died: 18 September 1839 (aged 79); Sainte-Mélanie, Quebec
- Occupations: educator, artist

Jeanne-Charlotte Allamand (April 16, 1760 – September 18, 1839) was a Swiss-born Canadian pioneer, educator and artist. She is best known for opening an academy to teach drawing, water-colour, music and language in Montreal, as well as her work dealing with the affairs of taking charge of German colonists during her husband William Berczy's travels.

== Early life ==
Allamand was born in Lausanne, Switzerland. She was the second of two daughters born of Jean-Emmanuel Allamand and Judith-Henriette-Françoise David. Her father worked as a draper and dyer, which allowed Allamand to receive a good education. In 1785, Jeanne met her husband Albert-Guillaume Berczy, who later called himself William. At this time, he was working as a painter of miniatures. The two were married near Lausanne on November 1, 1785. Shortly after, they had two sons, William Bent and Charles Albert.

== Personal life and education ==
The couple lived in Florence until about 1790, though they travelled frequently. In that year, they moved to London and both exhibited paintings at the Royal Academy of Arts. William exhibited a miniature and Allamand two genre scenes called "Tuscan kitchen interiors". She perhaps had received previous painting instruction through her education in Lausanne. She also received lessons later on from her husband in Florence. The following year in 1791, Allamand's husband accepted the task of recruiting German colonists and they led them to the Genesee Association in New York state. Allamand, her husband and their eldest son left with the first group of settlers in the spring of 1792. Shortly after, the agent of the American colonization group, Charles Williamson, did not meet the terms of their agreement and Berczy left the settlement to near present-day Canaseraga, New York late in 1793 to seek help. After her husband left, Allamand was left in charge of the immigrants for the winter of 1793–94, alongside the Lutheran minister who had accompanied the immigrants previously. Allamand taking charge of the colonists was a role which she was in frequently, upon her husband's departures and she did so capably.

After the first association was not a success, Allamand's husband assisted in the formation of a new association without Williamson's knowledge. The new German Company aimed to develop land in Upper Canada. Allamand and the pastor were left in charge of preparing the settlers for departure to the new location. The couple successfully led the colonists to Upper Canada where they were given land in Markham Township. Following this, Allamand and Berczy settled themselves in York, now known as Toronto. The Berczys and the new settlers struggled in the newly developing land and were running short of supplies much faster than anticipated. The Association backers were also reluctant to commit more money, which forced Berczy to again depart travelling extensively to secure food and tools, which he often put on credit. During her husband's extensive travelling, Allamand was once again left responsible for the affairs of the settlement.

In the later years of her life, Allamand had many difficult times where she struggled immensely with the lacking presence and support of her husband. She opened a haberdashery and textile shop to try and provide some source of income for her and her sons. Despite this attempt, she still lived in near poverty with little to none of the money owed to her husband by the settlers being repaid. The majority of the rest of Allamand's husband's life was occupied by travels in attempt to settle agreements and make ends meet. At one point, Berczy was forced to sell their house, and Allamand was nearly homeless if not for the sympathy of the new owner who allowed her to stay. Eventually, Berczy returned and moved his family to Montreal in 1798. He departed for England the following year and did not return again until 1802, once again leaving Allamand to fend for herself. She dealt with matters of the Markham settlements through agents, all while trying to support her family. For the rest of Allamand's life, her husband was only present briefly from time to time.

== Teaching career ==
When left to support herself alone in Montreal, Allamand opened an academy school for girls in her small rented accommodations to teach drawing, water-colour, music, and languages. Her school of arts was quite successful, with some quite notable pupils studying with her. Likely her most noted pupil was Louise-Amélie Panet, daughter of Pierre-Louis Panet. Louis-Amélie learned many things from Allamand's academy of the arts and later became a painter and art teacher. She also married Allamand's son, William Bent in 1819. Allamand passed on her artistic teachings to her younger son, Charles Albert as well. Allamand's husband died in New York in 1813, however she still continued to teach until 1817.

== Life after husband's death ==
At some point after 1817, she joined her son William Bent in his home in Sandwich (which is Windsor of today) in Upper Canada. Allamand lived the remainder of her years with her son as a quiet life, only occasionally painting as a hobby. Around 1832, Allamand's son and his wife moved to Sainte-Mélanie, in the seigneury of Ailleboust which Louis-Amélie had inherited. Allamand went with her son for this last move. She died there in the presence of her family in 1839. After her death, there were many letters discovered that were exchanged between her and her husband throughout their lives and during his constant travels. The letters are filled with expressions of love and respect for each other. It seems that despite their distance, Allamand and her husband remained strong throughout the journeys of their lives. Allamand was always a dutiful and supportive wife through all of her husband's trials and tribulations. It was clearly a strength and a talent that she possessed to maintain their family's strength even through difficult times during hid absences. Without Allamand's efforts, her husband's colonization scheme would have been much more difficult to carry out and their family could have very well fallen into poverty.
