= Notre-Dame-de-Lourdes, Lanaudière =

Notre-Dame-de-Lourdes
- Municipality
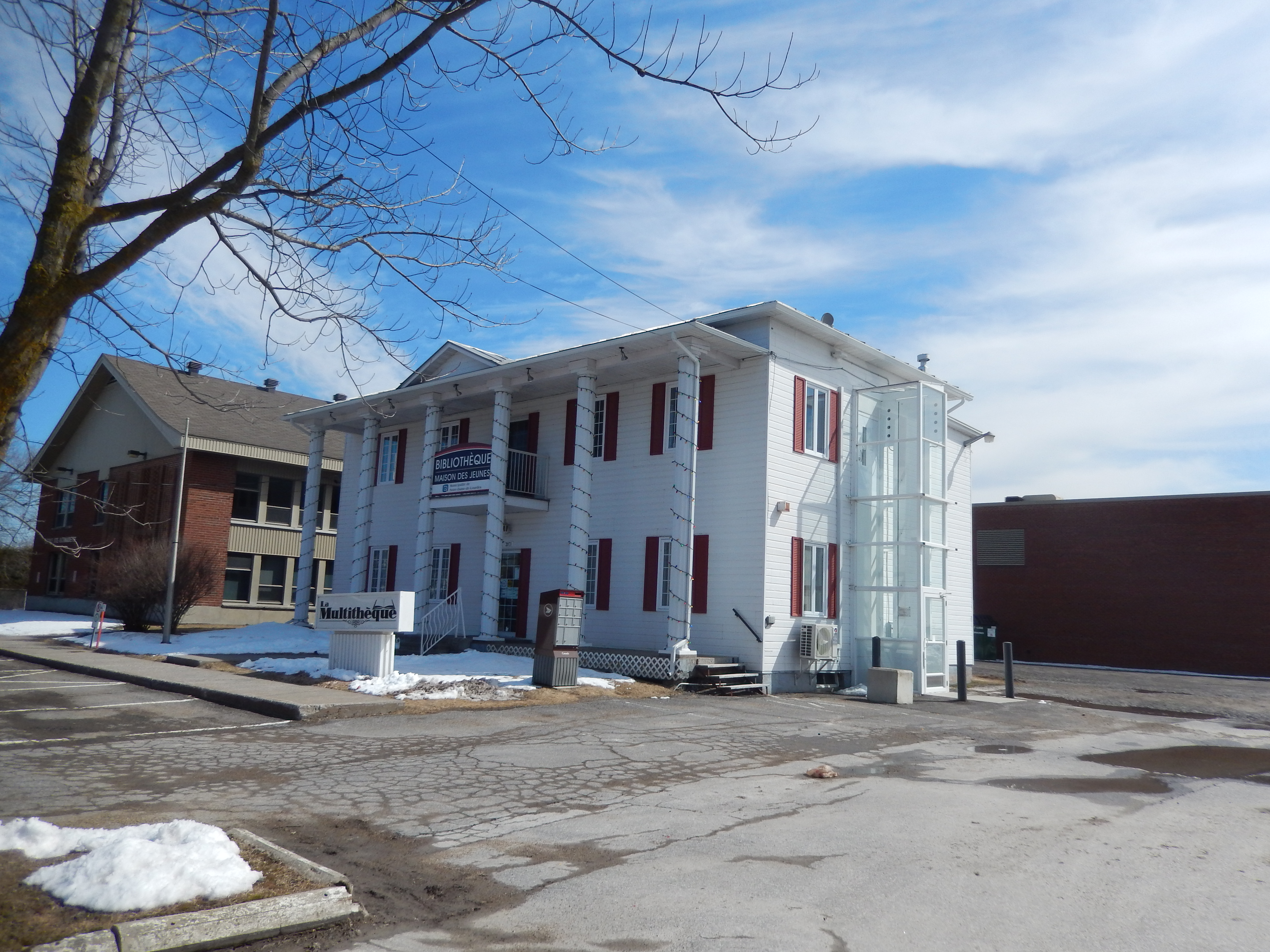
- Public Library

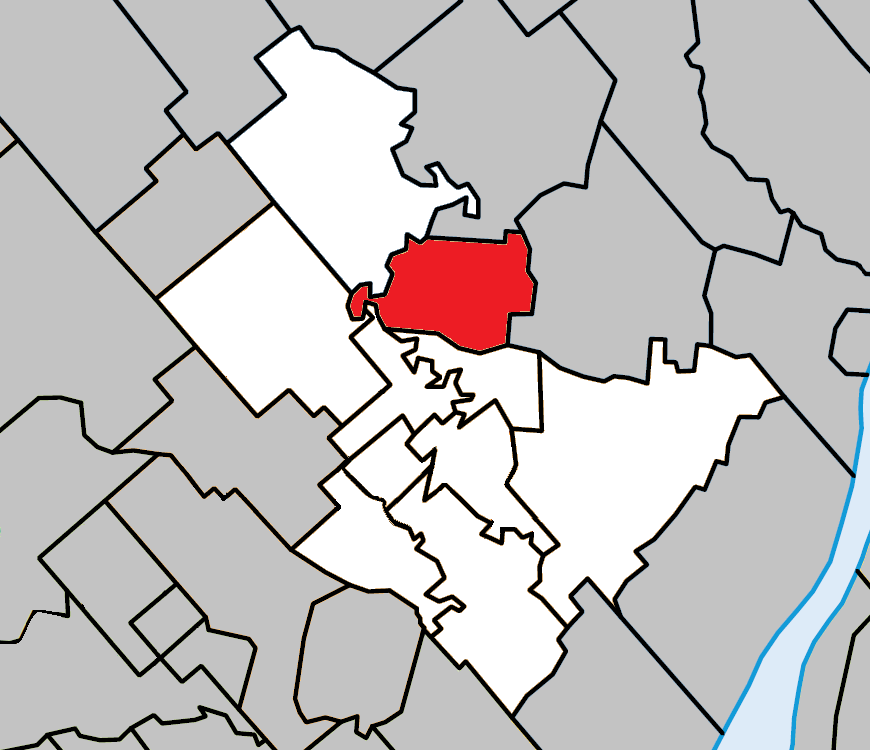
- Location within Joliette RCM

- Location in central Quebec
- Coordinates: 46°06′N 73°26′W
- Country: Canada
- Province: Quebec
- Region: Lanaudière
- RCM: Joliette
- Constituted: October 28, 1925

Government
  - Mayor: Céline Geoffroy
  - Federal riding: Joliette
  - Prov. riding: Joliette

Area
  - Total: 36.10 km^{2} (13.94 sq mi)
  - Land: 35.69 km^{2} (13.78 sq mi)

Population (2021)
  - Total: 3,141
  - Density: 88.2/km^{2} (228/sq mi)
  - Pop 2016-2021: ▲12.9%
  - Dwellings: 1,352
- Time zone: UTC−5 (EST)
  - Summer (DST): UTC−4 (EDT)
- Postal code(s): J0K 1K0
- Area codes: 450 and 579
- Highways: R-131
- Website: www.notredamedelourdes.ca

Notre-Dame-de-Lourdes (French pronunciation: [nɔtʁə dam də luʁd]) is a municipality in the Lanaudière region of Quebec, Canada, part of the Joliette Regional County Municipality. It is located along the eastern shores of the L'Assomption River.

== Demographics ==
Population trend:

- Population in 2021: 3141 (2016 to 2021 population change: 12.9%)
- Population in 2016: 2783 (2011 to 2016 population change: 7.2%)
- Population in 2011: 2595 (2006 to 2011 population change: 17.9%)
- Population in 2006: 2201 (2001 to 2006 population change: 1.1%)
- Population in 2001: 2176
- Population in 1996: 2087
- Population in 1991: 2060

Private dwellings occupied by usual residents: 1298 (total dwellings: 1352)

Mother tongue:

- English as first language: 0.8%
- French as first language: 97.2%
- English and French as first language: 0.8%
- Other as first language: 1%

== Education ==
Centre de services scolaire des Samares operates francophone public schools, including:

- École Sainte-Bernadette

The Sir Wilfrid Laurier School Board operates anglophone public schools, including:

- Joliette Elementary School in Saint-Charles-Borromée
- Joliette High School in Joliette

== See also ==
- List of municipalities in Quebec
