= Quantztown, Ontario =

Quantztown
- Unincorporated community
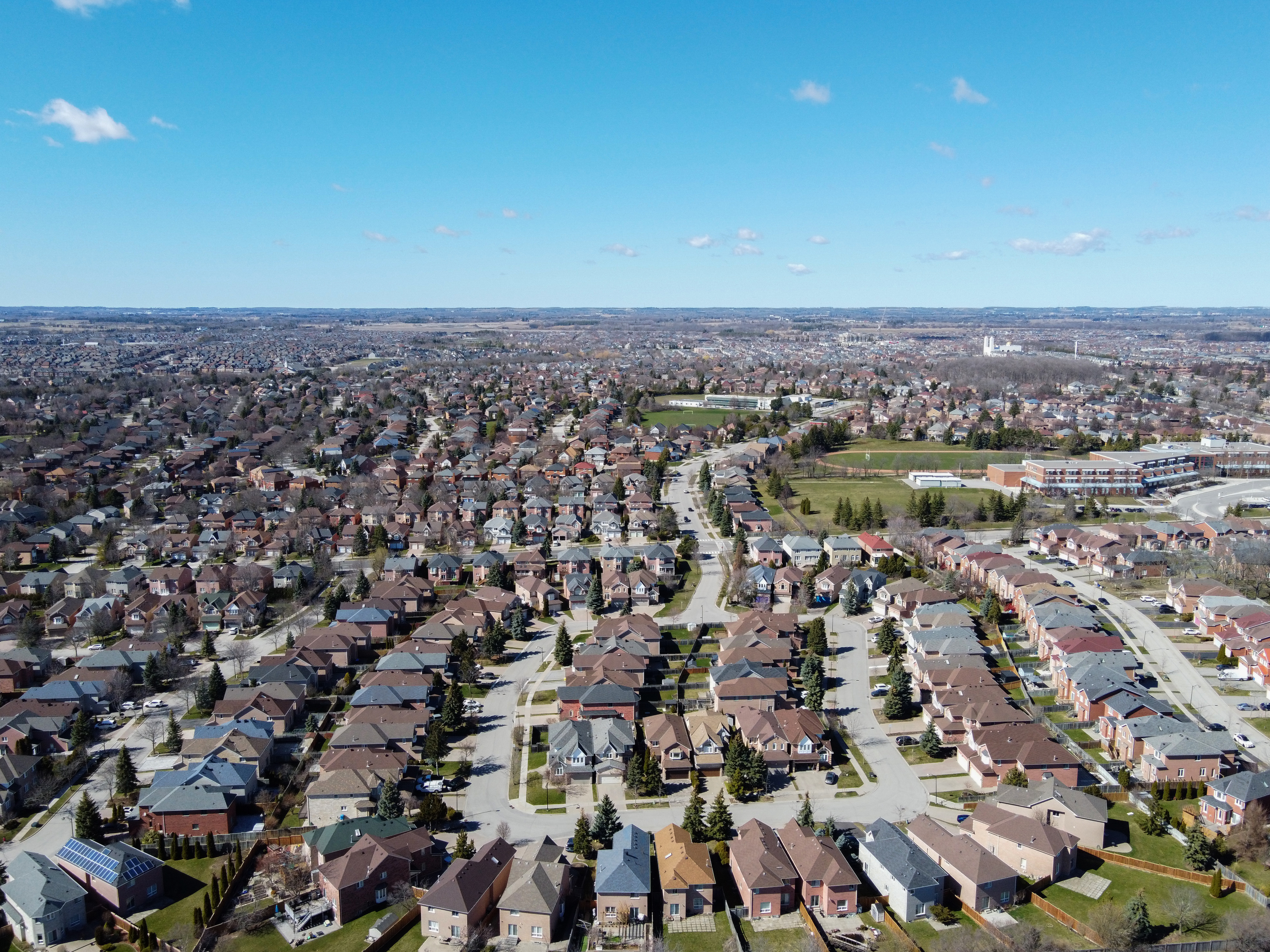
- Aerial view of Quantztown in 2024

- Location of Quantztown in Ontario
- Coordinates: 43°52′47″N 79°17′43″W
- Country: Canada
- Province: Ontario
- Regional municipality: York
- City: Markham
- Established: 1805
- Time zone: UTC-5 (EST)
  - Summer (DST): UTC-4 (EDT)
- Area codes: 905 and 289
- NTS Map: 030M14
- GNBC Code: FCIZE

Quantztown is an unincorporated community located in the city of Markham, Ontario, Canada, near McCowan Road and 16th Avenue. It is named for German settler Melchior Quantz (1749–1827), who arrived in 1794 along with William Berczy and other settlers.

== Development ==
As early as the 1990s, the area was still at the edge of residential development, with land north of 16th Avenue still agricultural. Since the late 1990s, however, the land has given way to single family homes. Home development began in the early 1980s along Longwater Chase in Unionville's Bridle Trail, and completed in the early 2000s along the west side of Manhattan Drive.

Since Markham has been quickly growing, there often is confusion as to where Quantztown really is. For example, west on Carlton Road, past McCowan Road there is a park area named "Quantztown Park", though the park itself actually lies outside of the actual area designated Quantztown. The actual Quantztown exists more so on the south-west corner of McCowan Road and 16th Avenue, where there is notably a cemetery named Quantztown Cemetery.

Quantztown Pond is located on the south side of Carlton road just east of Kennedy Road.

== Education ==
Currently, the area is served by three schools:

- Markville Secondary School and Central Park Public School with the York Region District School Board
- St. Matthew Catholic School with the York Catholic District School Board
- Central Park Public School

== Other community services ==
The area also contains the city's only police station, 5 District of the York Regional Police.

Quantztown Cemetery was opened in 1840s with first burial in 1844, last in 1946 and closed in 1952). A church was once located next to the cemetery but disappeared since. Later members of the Quantz family are buried here.

The area was once the original location of "The Village Grocer" up until 2011 before it moved north to the Angus Glen area.
