= Berczy Village =

- Neighbourhood
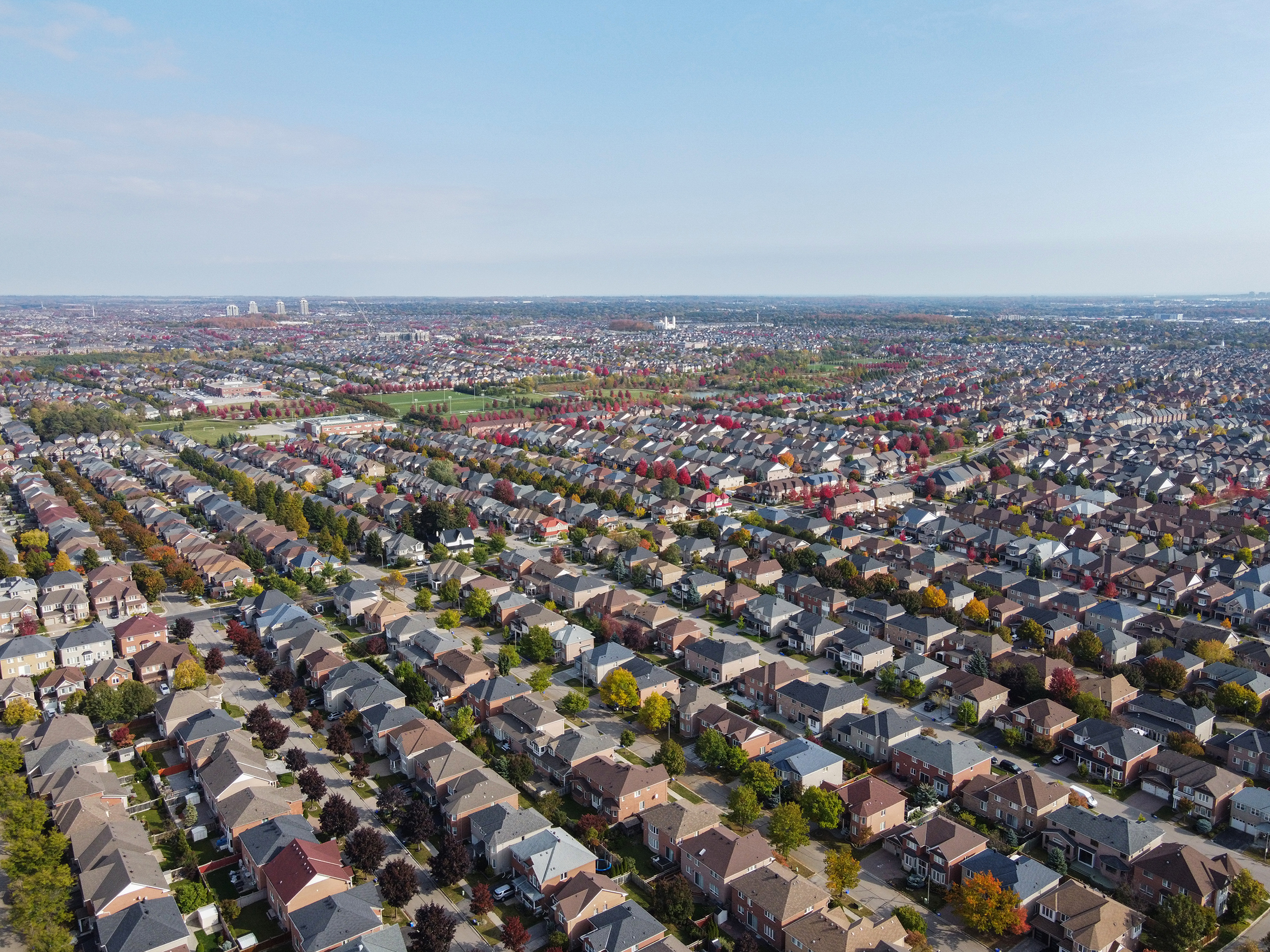
- Berczy Village

- Berczy Village within Markham

- Location within Regional Municipality of York
- Country: Canada
- Province: Ontario
- Regional Municipality: York
- City: Markham

Government
  - MP: Michael Ma (Markham— Unionville)
  - MPP: Billy Pang (Markham—Unionville)
  - Councillor: Amanda Yeung Collucci (Ward 6)

Area
  - Total: 1.69 sq mi (4.37 km^{2})

Population (2006 Population)
  - Total: 15,260
  - Density: 9,044.2/sq mi (3,491.99/km^{2})
- Postal Code span: L6C

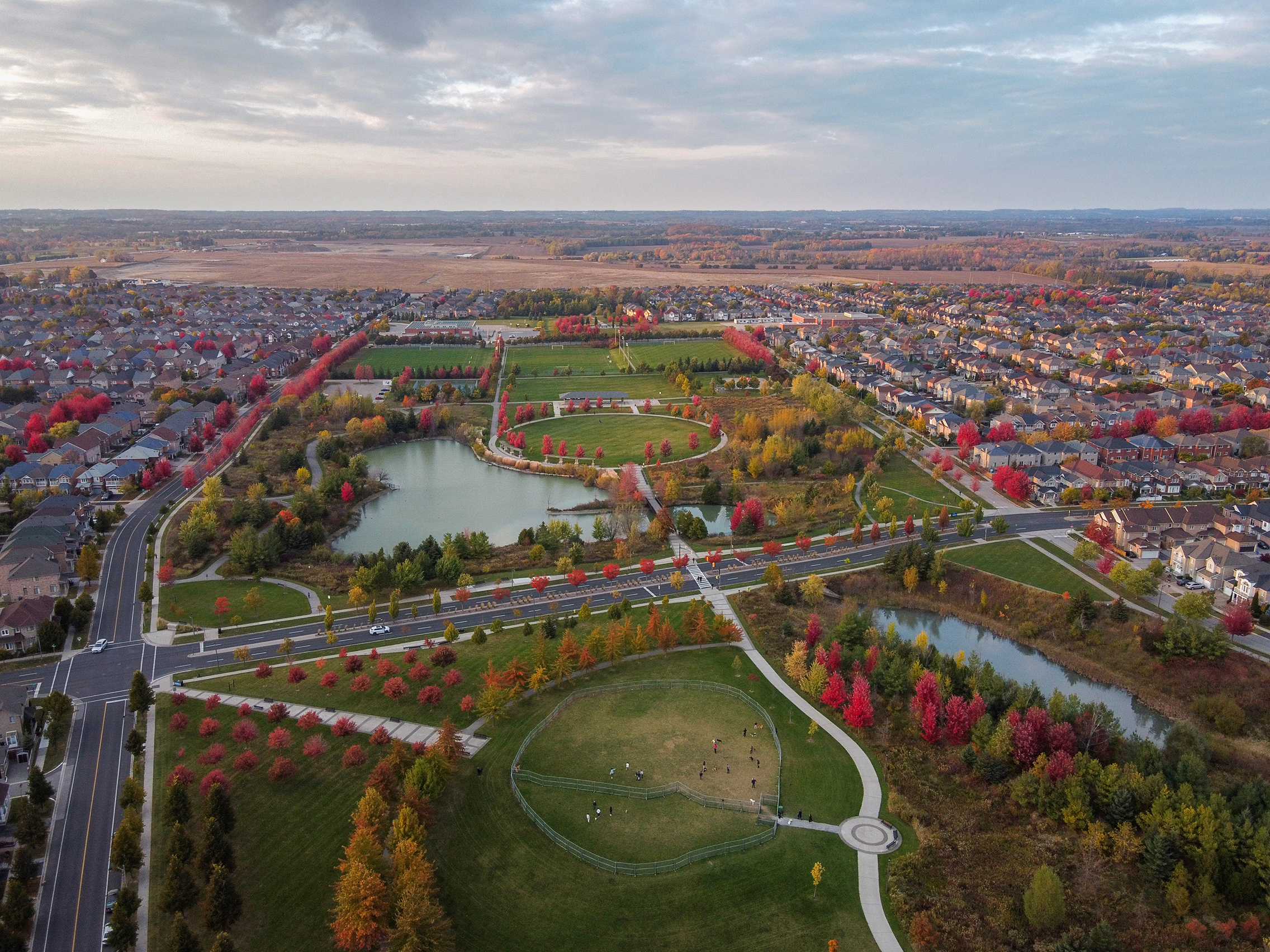
Berczy Park

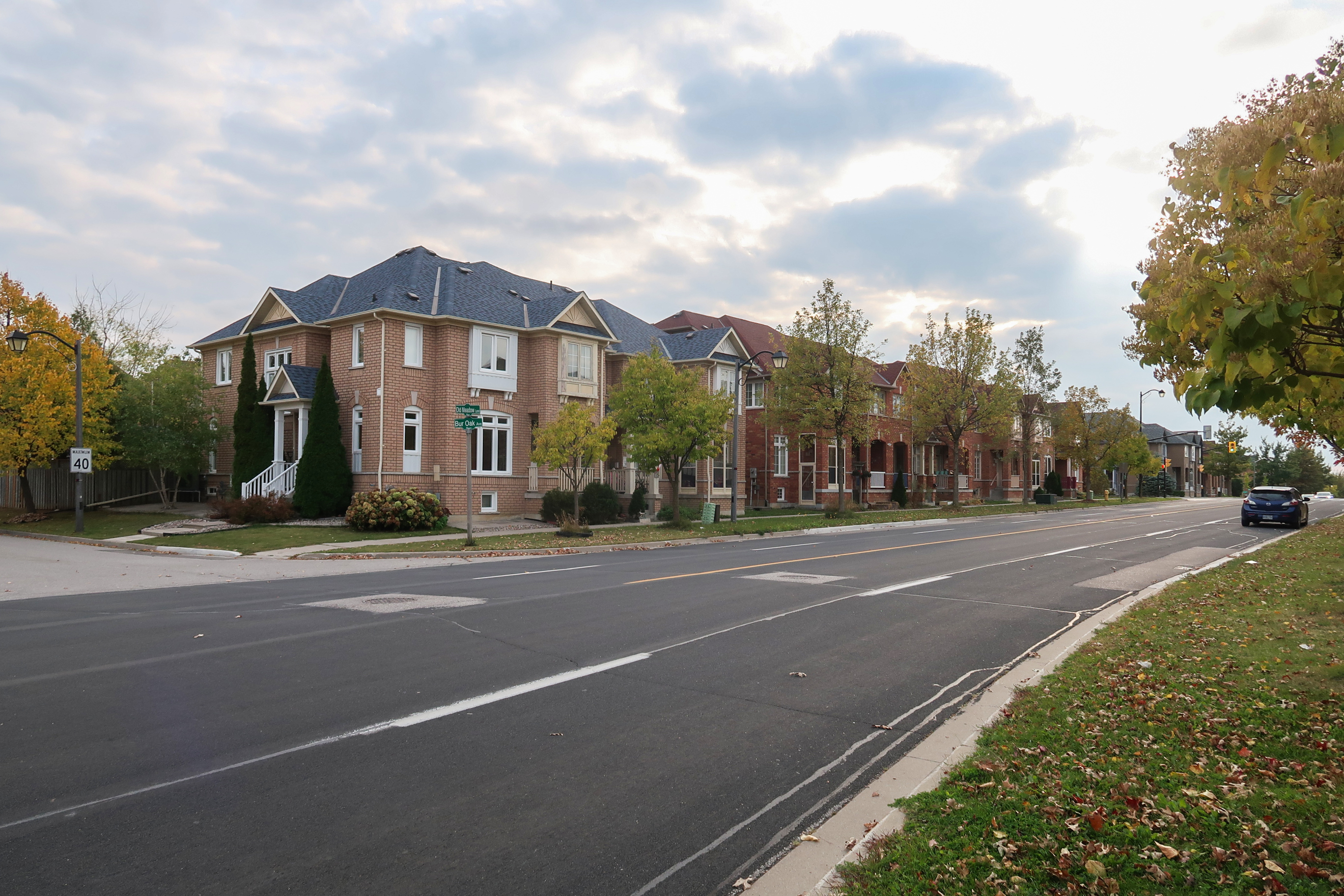
Bur Oak Avenue in Berczy Village.

Berczy Village /ˈbɜːrzi/ is a residential neighbourhood in Markham, Ontario, Canada. It is bounded to the north by Major Mackenzie Drive, to the east by McCowan Road, to the south by 16th Avenue, and to the west by Kennedy Road. This area is north of Unionville. The community is named after William Berczy, Markham's founder. The name appears on limestone plaques at the entrances to the community's arterial roads .

The community is known for its variety of mixed-income dwellings and the green space found in most subdivisions. Townhouses and some semi-detached homes can be found along Bur Oak Avenue, whereas semi-detached and detached homes are found on residential streets. It is also noted for the garage alleyways behind the townhomes and some semi-detached homes and the plentiful spacious catwalks.

Berczy Village adheres to the City of Markham's "Smart Growth" development plan. The carefully planned urban design scheme puts an emphasis on open space, protection of environmentally sensitive areas, and conservation of woodlots.

== History ==
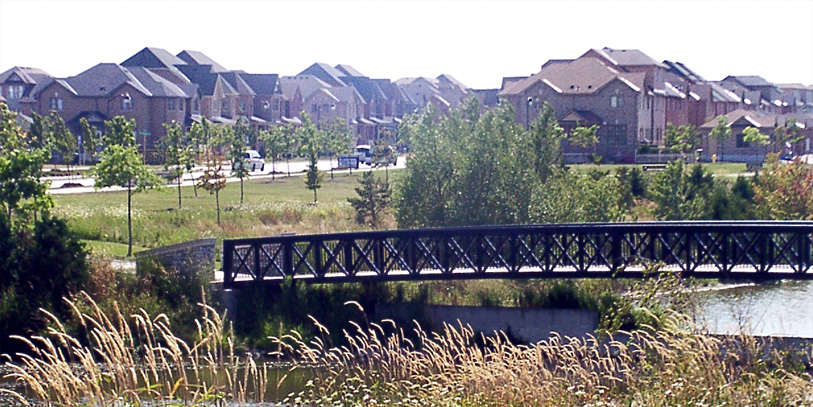
Bridge at Berczy Park with townhomes in the background.

Berczy Village was established over what was once farmland that belonged to Frederick Bagg, a prominent agriculturalist and Jersey cattle breeder, and his wife Emma. Old historical houses that once belonged to the owners of the land still exist and can be found within the neighbourhood. It is a highly residential neighbourhood and the construction of the community began in the mid-1990s, with a majority of homes being fully complete in the early 2000s. Many parts of the area are still undergoing development, mainly north of Madison Heights Blvd.

The southwestern portion of the community remains undeveloped; it was recently sold to four homebuilders for $100 million. When traveling north or south along Kennedy Road, one will notice a pathway to a house and barn, the Bethesda Lutheran Cemetery, and a few trees stranded in the middle of a massive wheat field. The developers have prepared a "tree nursery" to preserve these trees, including the "historic Bur Oak tree".

The Berzcy Village extension known as Upper Unionville was completed in 2017 and it was themed to resemble Unionville Main Street. The property was farmed by the Beckett family since 1917 until development began in 2011. Streets are named after the family and historic preservation of the farm home and historic Berzcy cabin has been incorporated into the Upper Unionville plan.

== Demographic Information ==
The demographics of Berczy Village is diverse with residents coming from predominantly East Asian (mostly Chinese Canadian) heritage. Residents of Berczy Village also include South Asian, Middle Eastern, European, African, and mixed heritage Canadian families.

	Census Tract 5350403.06 (North of Bur Oak Avenue)	Census Tract 5350403.07 (South of Bur Oak Avenue)	Berczy Village Total
Population in 2006	9,079	6,181	15,260
Population Growth from 2001	+180%	+119%	+151.61%
Total Private Dwellings	2,480	1,821	4,301
Private dwellings of usual residents	2,447	1,794	4,241
Population Density (Persons Per km^{2})	4,521.9	2,620.8	3,491.99
Land Area (km^{2})	2.01	2.36	4.37
Median age of residents	36.0	35.9	35.95
% of population over 15 years old	77.2	77.6	77.4

† Footnote: Based on the 2006 Census.

== Parks ==
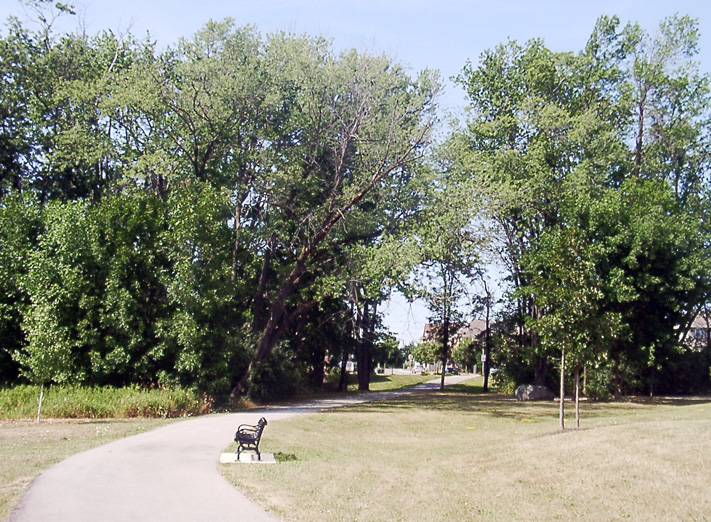
A pathway leading into a grove of trees, planted by the Bagg family in the early 1920s.

The community has many large open green spaces and forest groves.

The main parks in Berczy Village are:

- Berczy Park

Bur Oak Avenue divides this massive park in the village center. The north part has three soccer fields with bleachers, a playground, a circular pathway, a pond with a bridge, and a parking lot. The southern portion has an oval pathway with a baseball diamond and a little stream with a bridge over it.

- Frederick Bagg Park

Named in honour of the area's former land owner, this park east of All Saints Catholic Elementary School has a plaque honoring Bagg and his family and a circular pathway encircling a small playground and shelter.

- Nördlingen Park

Found in the southern portion of the village, close to 16th Avenue. It is dedicated in honour of Markham's twin city of Nördlingen in Bavaria, Germany. It contains a small pond with a playground area.

- Williamstown Green

An open space of grass and tall trees west of the Williamstown Plaza along Bur Oak Avenue.

- Berczy Square

A new park with a pond and a bronze statue of William Berczy will be built at the corner of Kennedy Road and 16th Avenue.

== Politics ==
Berczy Village is part of the following political districts:

- Ward 6, represented by Councilor Amanda Yeung Collucci
- Wards 2 & 6, English Public Trustee (York Region District School Board), represented by Ron Lynn
- Wards 1, 2, 3, & 6, English Catholic Trustee (York Catholic District School Board), represented by Carol Cotton
- Markham-Unionville, provincial electoral riding, represented by MPP Billy Pang (Progressive Conservative)
- Markham-Unionville, federal electoral riding, represented by MP Michael Ma (Liberal)

== William Berczy Settlement Historical Cemetery ==
Along Kennedy Road is the William Berczy Settlement Historical Cemetery, formerly Bethesda Church and Burying Ground. The site was once the home of Phillip Eckardt, then home to St. Phiilip's Lutheran Church from 1820 to 1910.

== Religious institutions ==
=== Churches ===
- Unionville Alliance Church
- Unionville Oasis

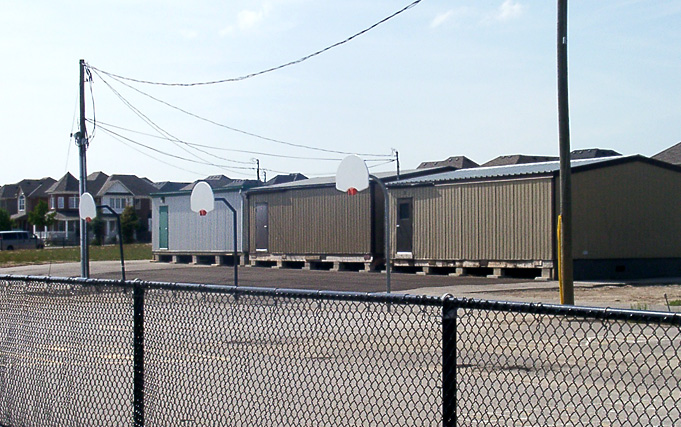
Portable buildings located in All Saints Catholic Elementary School's school grounds.

== Schools ==
- Pierre Elliott Trudeau High School
- All Saints Catholic Elementary School
- Beckett Farm Public School
- Castlemore Public School
- Stonebridge Public School

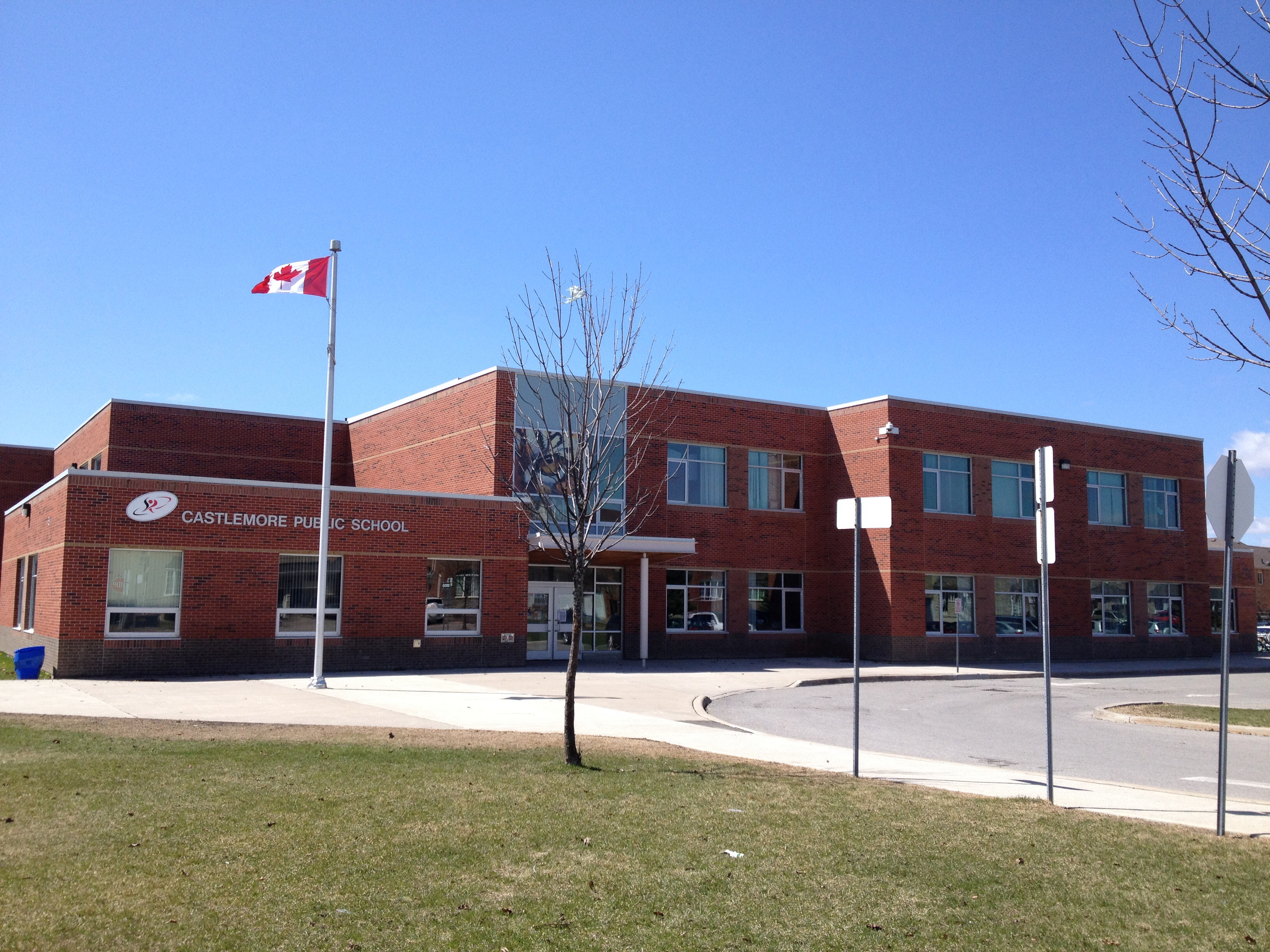
Castlemore Public School

== Transportation ==
The main arterial roads that pass through Berczy Village are Bur Oak Avenue, Castlemore Avenue, and The Bridle Walk. Other important arterial streets include Ridgecrest Road, Stonebridge Drive, and William Berczy Boulevard.

=== Public Transit ===
The following bus routes have services in and around this community:

- TTC Route 129A - McCowan North
- YRT Route 4A - Major MacKenzie
- YRT Route 8 - Kennedy
- YRT Route 18 - Bur Oak
- YRT Route 16 - 16th Avenue
- YRT Route 42/204 - Berczy South Unionville
