= Pierre-Louis Panet =

Canadian politician (1761–1812)

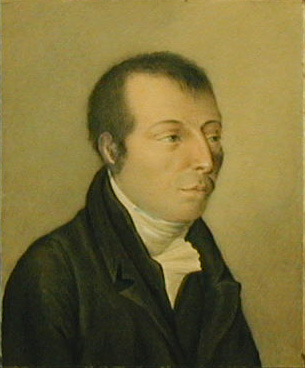
Pierre-Louis Panet, 1812, painted post-mortem by the subject's son-in-law, William Bent Berczy.

Pierre-Louis Panet (August 1, 1761 – December 2, 1812) was a Canadian lawyer, notary, seigneur, judge and political figure in Lower Canada.

He was born in Montreal in 1761, the son of Pierre Panet, a lawyer. Panet qualified to practice as a lawyer in 1779 and as a notary in 1780. He practiced as a notary at Montreal from 1781 to 1783 and at Quebec City from 1783 to 1785. In 1781, he purchased the seigneury of Argenteuil. In 1783, he was named French language clerk for the Court of Common Pleas in Quebec district. In 1785, he was appointed clerk in the Prerogative Court. Panet was elected to the Legislative Assembly of Lower Canada for Cornwallis in 1792 and was elected in Montreal East in 1800. In 1794, he was named clerk for the Court of King's Bench in Quebec District. He was named judge in the same court for Montreal district in 1795. He sold his property at Argenteuil in 1800 and bought the seigneuries of Ailleboust and Ramezay. In 1801, Panet became an honorary member of the Executive Council serving as judge and executive councillor until his death.

He died of a stroke at Montreal in 1812 was entombed at the Notre Dame des Neiges Cemetery in Montreal.

In 1781, he married Marie-Anne, the daughter of Jean-Gabriel Cerré. His brother Bonaventure also served in the legislative assembly. His cousin, Jean-Antoine Panet, served as speaker of the assembly. His daughter Charlotte-Mélanie Panet (1794–1872) and her husband, Marc-Antoine-Louis Lévesque (1782–1833), were instrumental in the formation of Sainte-Mélanie, a town within the Ailleboust Seignory.

His daughter married Upper and Lower Canada politician William Bent Berczy.
