= William Berczy =

Canadian pioneer and painter (1744–1813)

William von Moll Berczy
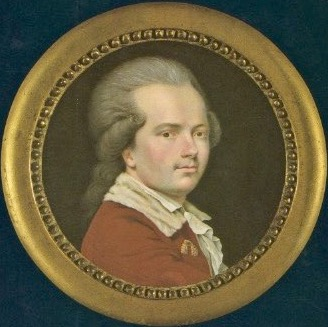
- Self-portrait, 1783
- Born: Johann Albrecht Ulrich Moll; December 10, 1744; Wallerstein, Bavaria
- Died: February 5, 1813 (aged 68); New York City
- Other name: William Burksay (the name on his coffin)
- Occupations: Diplomat; artist; land speculator; architect
- Spouse: Jeanne-Charlotte Allamand

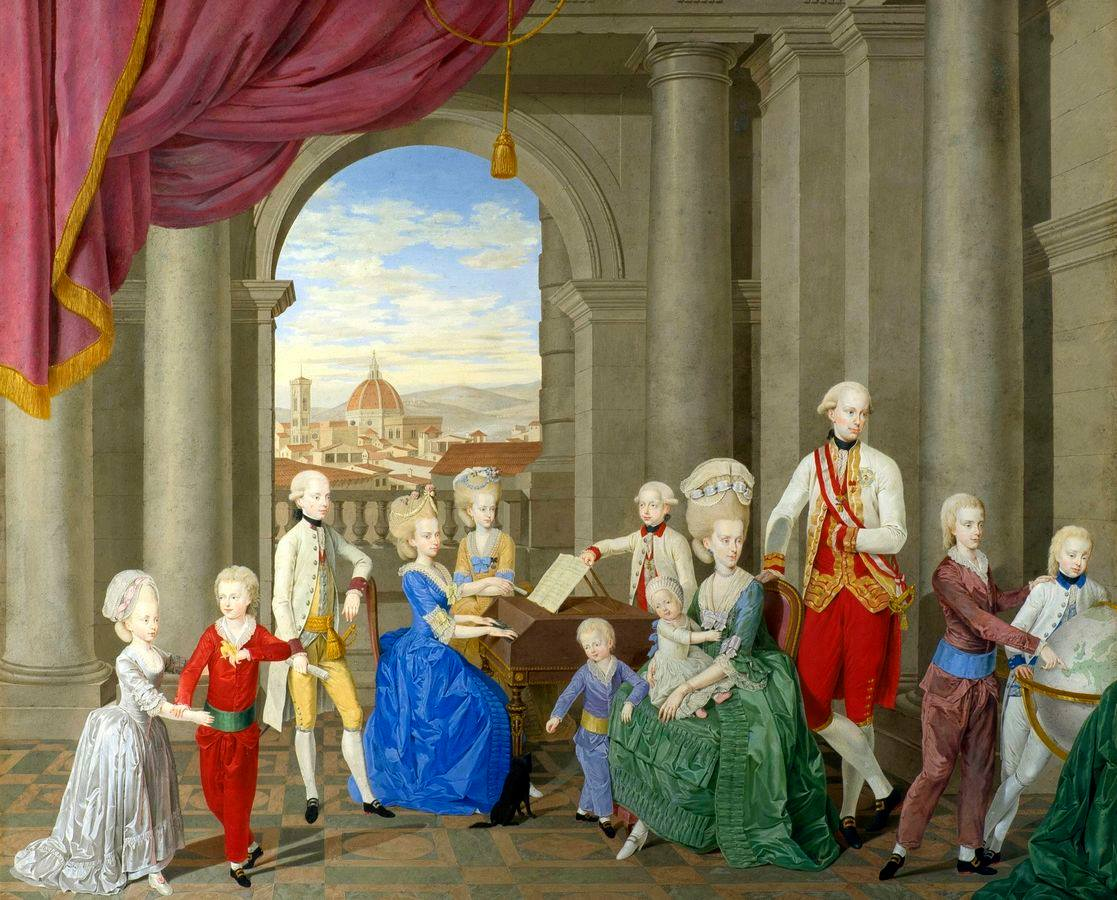
William Berczy, The family of Peter Leopold of Tuscany, 1781–1782, Galleria d'Arte moderna, Florence

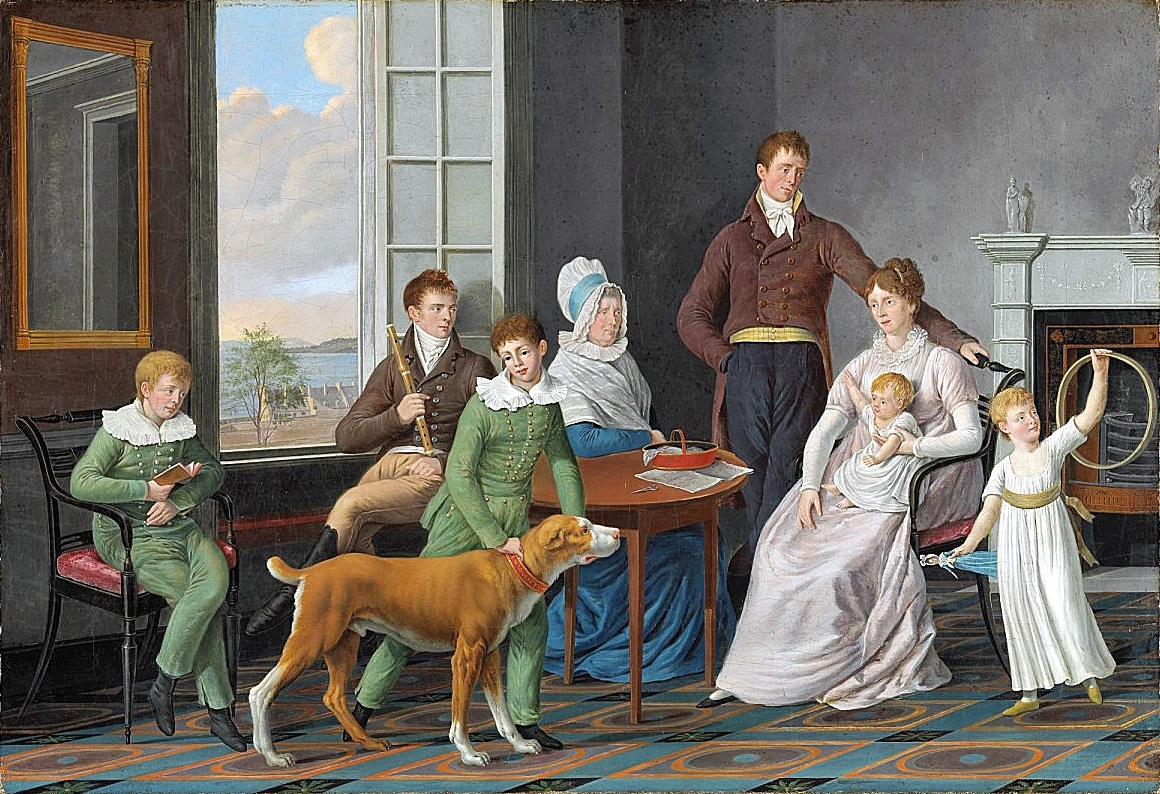
William Berczy, The Woolsey Family (1809)

William von Moll Berczy (December 10, 1744 – February 5, 1813) was a German-born Upper Canada pioneer and painter. He is considered one of the co-founders of the Town of York, Upper Canada, now Toronto, Ontario, Canada and one of Canada's pre-eminent pre-Confederation artists.

== Biography ==
Berczy was born in Wallerstein, Swabia, Electorate of Bavaria (part of the Holy Roman Empire and now in Germany) as a son of the Wirklicher Hofrat (Albrecht Theodor Moll) and Johanna Josepha Walpurga Moll (née Hefele). Berczy was originally named Johann Albrecht Ulrich Moll, but started going by the name William Berczy in the 1770s after having received the nickname “Berczy” from a Hungarian militia troop leader he met during his diplomatic mission in Poland. After his marriage, he officially changed his name.

He studied at the Akademie der bildenden Künste in Vienna and at the University of Jena in Saxony. His early career was spent in several European countries, including Poland, Switzerland, and Italy. In 1792, Berczy sailed for the Americas, settling in Philadelphia, then setting up a business in York, Upper Canada (now Toronto). A few years later, his work took him to Lower Canada (Quebec).

Berczy married, on November 1, 1785, Jeanne-Charlotte Berczy née Allamand (1760–1839) of Lausanne (canton of Bern, now - since 1803 - canton of Vaud), Switzerland. They had two sons, William Bent Berczy and Charles Albert Berczy. His son Charles Albert Berczy became the second postmaster of Toronto.

Berczy helped John Graves Simcoe establish a settlement north of York, called German Mills with his migrants under the German Land Company, which later became the town of Markham.

"William Berczy, co-founder of Toronto, along with his German Pioneers, cleared part of the townsite of York (Toronto), erected houses and a magazine, built 15 miles of Yonge street (Eglinton to Elgin Mills some without shoes) in addition to 30 miles of roads in Markham township and also cleared 24 miles of the Rouge river waterway for navigation."

Berczy built homes in York and Markham, including Russell Abbey in York.

Berczy painted. His two best-known pictures are a full-length portrait of the Mohawk chief Thayendanegea (Joseph Brant) (c. 1807) and a group portrait of the Woolsey Family (1809). Although best known for his portraits, he also carried out religious paintings and architectural work, including plans for the Anglican Christ Church Cathedral in Montreal in 1803, and was a surveyor.

Berczy travelled to New York City during the War of 1812 and was stranded when attempting to travel. He first stayed in Middlebury, Vermont, with friends, then to Albany, New York, then to New York City from which he planned to travel to England. He fell ill while in New York and died while in the care of friends. He was buried in an unmarked grave at Trinity Church as William Burksay. His wife moved in with her son William and died on September 18, 1839, in Sainte-Mélanie, Lower Canada. Berczy was also survived by his other son, Charles Albert Berczy.

== Legacy ==
An elementary school in central Markham (Unionville) is named William Berczy Public School in his honour. The school, founded in 1967, has approximately 600 students in grades K–8. Also in honour of this founder, the then Town of Markham named one of its densely populated neighbourhoods after him, the Berczy Village. Berczy Creek is a tributary of the Rouge River in Markham. A bronze statue of Berczy will be situated in at Berczy Square, a park to be built at Berczy Village near Kennedy Road and 16th Avenue in Markham. Within Berczy Village is William Berczy Settlement Historical Cemetery.

William Berczy Boulevard is a major road from Major Mackenzie Drive to 16th Avenue in Berczy Village, Berczy Gate is a short street near Highway 7 and Ninth Line and Berczy Creek Way is a short road near 16th Avenue and Warden Avenue in Markham. In Toronto a roadway called Leader Lane was renamed from Berczy Lane. There is also Berczy Street in Aurora running next to the train station.

Berczy Park is a small park located behind the Gooderham Building at Front Street and Wellington Street in Toronto, Ontario. The park had been vacant for many decades and once used as a parking lot after the buildings on the site were demolished. A tree-lined city park emerged after the late 1980s and has undergone renovations from 2015 to 2016.

Berczy Street Park and Berczy Street are found in Barrie, Ontario. Berczy-Strasse is a street named for him in Wallerstein, Bavaria.

In 2016, Berczy was named a National Historic Person.

=== In fiction ===
Berczy is the subject of John Steffler's biographical novel German Mills: A Novel Pertaining to the Life and Times of William Berczy at Google Books (Gaspereau Press, 2015).
