= Sainte-Mélanie, Quebec =

Sainte-Mélanie
- Municipality
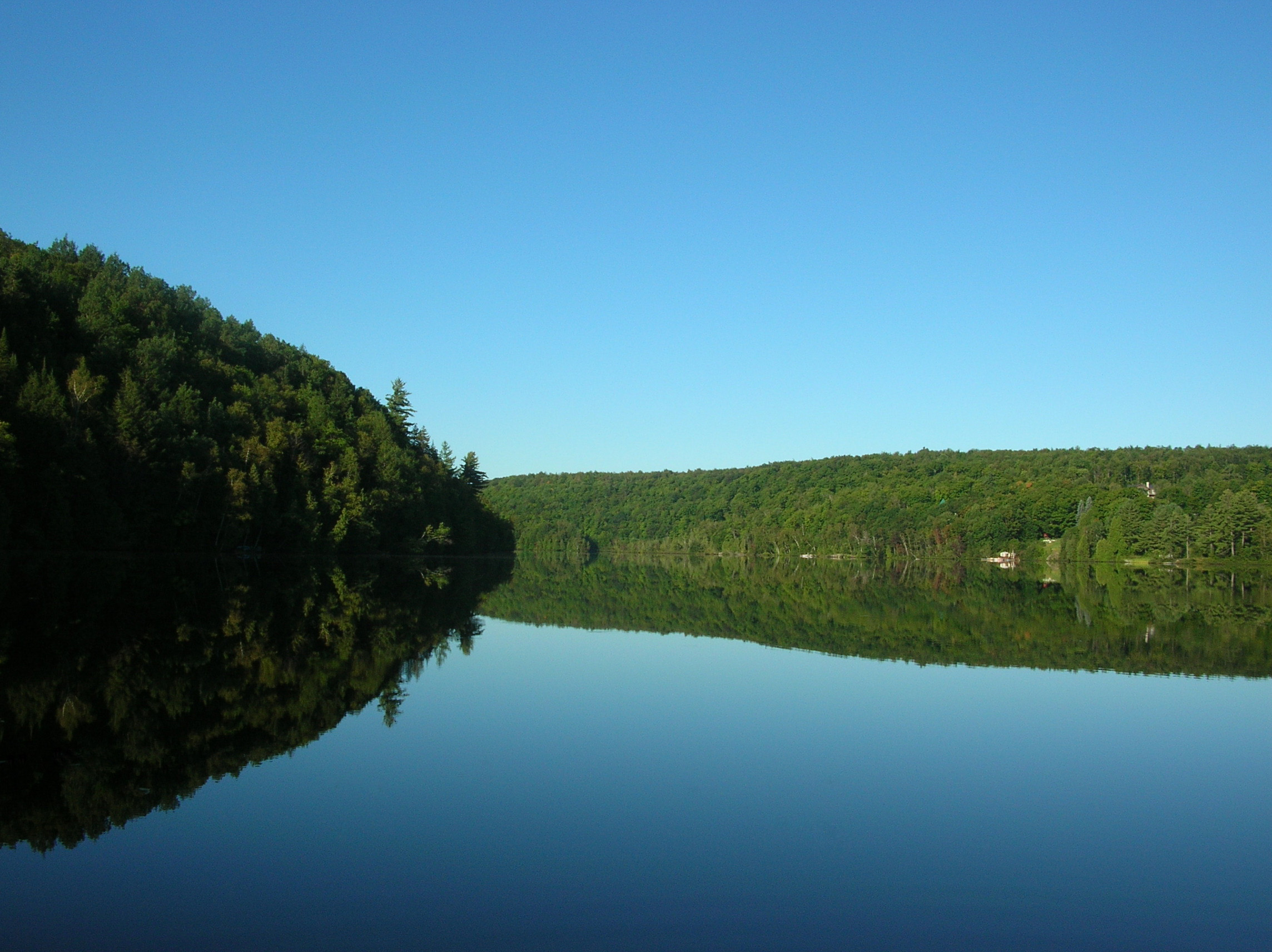
- Rocher Lake, largest lake within the municipality

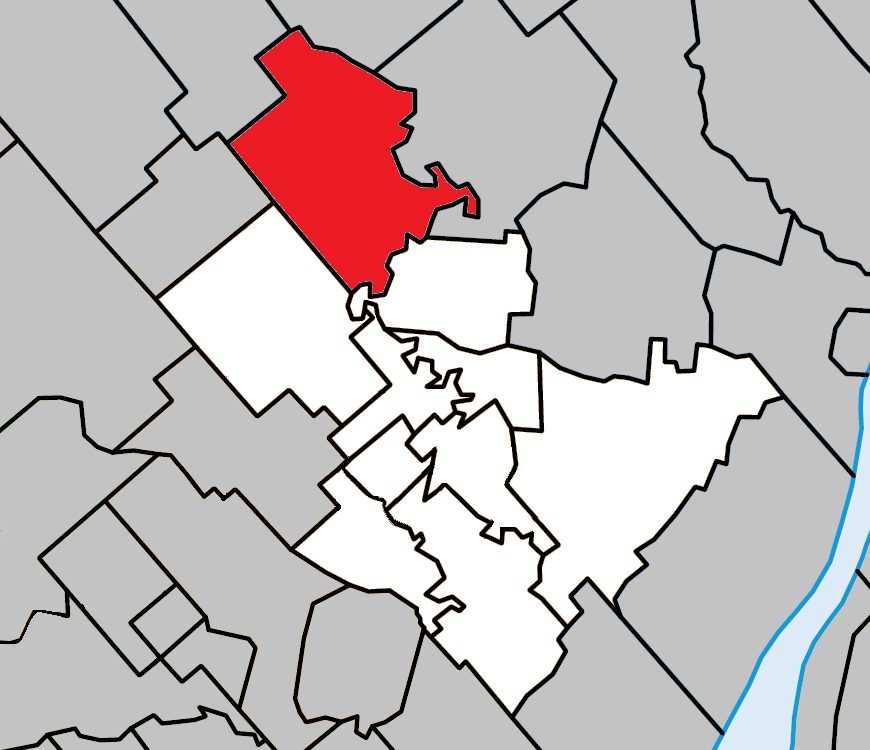
- Location within Joliette RCM.

- Location in central Quebec.
- Coordinates: 46°08′N 73°31′W
- Country: Canada
- Province: Quebec
- Region: Lanaudière
- RCM: Joliette
- Constituted: July 1, 1855

Government
  - Mayor: Yves Beaulieu
  - Federal riding: Joliette
  - Prov. riding: Joliette

Area
  - Total: 78.30 km^{2} (30.23 sq mi)
  - Land: 76.10 km^{2} (29.38 sq mi)

Population (2021)
  - Total: 3,250
  - Density: 42.7/km^{2} (111/sq mi)
  - Pop 2016-2021: ▲8.7%
  - Dwellings: 1,518
- Time zone: UTC−5 (EST)
  - Summer (DST): UTC−4 (EDT)
- Postal code(s): J0K 3A0
- Area codes: 450 and 579
- Highways: R-348
- Website: www.sainte-melanie.ca

Sainte-Mélanie (French pronunciation: [sɛ̃t melani]) is a municipality in the Lanaudière region of Quebec, Canada, part of the Joliette Regional County Municipality. It is located along the western shores of the L'Assomption River.

== History ==
Sainte-Mélanie was formerly part of the territory of the Ailleboust Seignory, granted to Jean d'Ailleboust d'Argenteuil (1694-1785) in 1736. By 1800, Pierre-Louis Panet (1761-1812) was Lord of Ailleboust, whose daughter Charlotte-Mélanie Panet (1794-1872) may have been the source of the name Sainte-Mélanie, also a reference to Melania the Younger (383-439). Charlotte-Mélanie's husband, Marc-Antoine-Louis Lévesque (1782-1833), donated the land in 1814 for a chapel that was eventually built in 1830. The Parish of Sainte-Mélanie was founded in 1832, and four years later in 1836, the post office opened under the name Daillebout.

The municipality officially started in 1845, was soon after abolished, and reestablished in 1855 as Sainte-Mélanie-d'Ailleboust. In 1881, the post office was renamed to Sainte-Mélanie, and more than a century later in 1986, the municipality followed suit by also adopting this shortened name.

== Demographics ==
Historical population
Year	Pop.	±%
1991	2,282	—
1996	2,474	+8.4%
2001	2,633	+6.4%
2006	2,765	+5.0%
2011	2,892	+4.6%
2016	2,989	+3.4%
2021	3,250	+8.7%
Source: Statistics Canada

Private dwellings occupied by usual residents: 1,394 (total dwellings: 1,518)

Mother tongue:

- English as first language: 0.9%
- French as first language: 97.8%
- English and French as first language: 0%
- Other as first language: 1.3%

== Education ==
Commission scolaire des Samares operates francophone public schools, including:

- École Sainte-Hélène

The Sir Wilfrid Laurier School Board operates anglophone public schools, including:

- Joliette Elementary School in Saint-Charles-Borromée
- Joliette High School in Joliette

== Notable people from Sainte-Mélanie ==
- Aimé Pelletier (1914-2010), surgeon and well-known Quebec novelist, under the pen name of Bertrand Vac. Pelletier, who spent the majority of his professional career in Montreal, is interred with his ancestors at the Sainte-Mélanie cemetery.
- Louise-Amélie Panet (1789-1862), artist and poet, wife of the seigneur of Ailleboust, died in Sainte-Mélanie; the public library there is named in her honour.

== See also ==
- List of municipalities in Quebec
