= Dugas =

Dugas is a surname. Notable people with the surname include:

- May Dugas de Pallandt van Eerde (1869–1937), Baroness and conwoman
- Firmin Dugas (1830–1889), businessman and politician
- François Octave Dugas (1852–1918), politician
- Gaëtan Dugas (1953–1984), AIDS victim
- Gus Dugas (1907–1997), baseball player
- Jean-Baptiste Dugas-Montbel, translator
- Jeanne Dugas (1731–1817), Acadian woman
- Joseph Louis Euclide Dugas (1861–1943), farmer and politician
- Lucien Dugas (1897–1985), educator, lawyer and politician
- Martin Dugas (born 1972), soccer player
- Taylor Dugas (born 1989), American baseball player
- William Dugas (1809–unknown), millwright and politician

== See also ==
- Dugas, New Brunswick
