= Octave Magnan =

Canadian politician

Member of the Legislative Assembly of Quebec for Montcalm
- In office 1878–1881
- Preceded by: Louis-Gustave Martin
- Succeeded by: Jean-Baptiste-Trefflé Richard
- In office 1892–1897
- Preceded by: Joseph-Alcide Martin
- Succeeded by: Pierre-Julien-Léonidas Bissonnette

Personal details
- Born: April 23, 1836 Saint-Jacques, Lower Canada
- Died: May 7, 1921 (aged 85) Saint-Jacques, Quebec
- Party: Conservative

Octave Magnan (April 23, 1836 – May 7, 1921) was a former farmer and political figure in Quebec. He represented Montcalm in the Legislative Assembly of Quebec from 1878 to 1881 and from 1892 to 1897 as a Conservative.

He was born in Saint-Jacques, Lower Canada, the son of Gabriel Magnan and Rosalie Brouillet, and was educated at Saint-Alexis. In 1858, he married Odile Duval at Saint-Alexis. He ran unsuccessfully for the Quebec assembly seat in Montcalm in an 1874 by-election. He was elected in 1878 and defeated by Jean-Baptiste-Trefflé Richard when he ran for reelection in 1881. Magnan was elected again in 1892 and defeated by Pierre-Julien-Léonidas Bissonnette in 1897. He also ran unsuccessfully for a seat in the House of Commons in 1882 and 1891. He died in Saint-Jacques at the age of 85.
