= Victor Allard =

Canadian politician

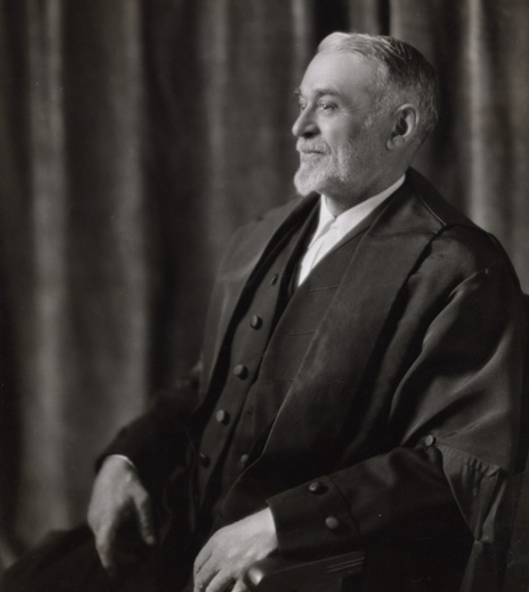

Member of the Legislative Assembly of Quebec for Berthier
- In office 1892–1897
- Preceded by: Cuthbert-Alphonse Chênevert
- Succeeded by: Cuthbert-Alphonse Chênevert

Personal details
- Born: February 1, 1860 Saint-Cuthbert, Canada East
- Died: June 3, 1931 (aged 71) Montreal, Quebec
- Party: Conservative

Victor Allard (February 1, 1860 – June 3, 1931) was a lawyer, judge and political figure in Quebec. He represented Berthier in the Legislative Assembly of Quebec from 1892 to 1897 as a Conservative.

He was born in Saint-Cuthbert, Canada East, the son of Prospère Allard and Geneviève Aurez Laférière, and was educated at the Collège de l'Assomption and the Université Laval. He articled with Joseph-Aldric Ouimet, was called to the Quebec bar in 1884 and set up practice in Berthierville. In 1885, he married Blanche Dorval. Allard was mayor of Berthier from 1899 to 1903 and from 1912 to 1915. He was an unsuccessful candidate for a seat in the Quebec assembly in 1890, losing to Cuthbert-Alphonse Chênevert. He defeated Chênevert in 1892 and then was defeated when he ran for reelection in 1897. Allard was an unsuccessful candidate again in a 1904 by-election. He was also defeated when he ran for a federal seat for Berthier in 1891 and 1908. In 1916, he was named to the Quebec Superior Court for Montreal district; he was named to the Court of King's Bench at Montreal in 1920. Allard died in Montreal at the age of 71.
