= Cuthbert-Alphonse Chênevert =

Canadian politician (1859–1920)

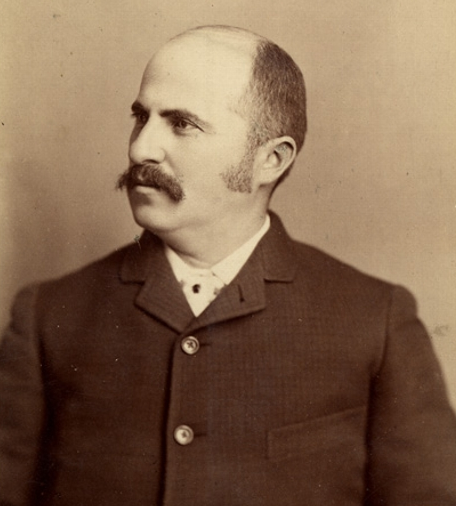

Member of the Legislative Assembly of Quebec for Berthier
- In office 1890–1892
- Preceded by: Omer Dostaler
- Succeeded by: Victor Allard

Personal details
- Born: May 22, 1859 Saint-Cuthbert, Canada East
- Died: July 7, 1920 (aged 61) Berthier, Quebec
- Party: Liberal

Cuthbert-Alphonse Chênevert (May 22, 1859 – July 7, 1920) was a lawyer and political figure in Quebec. He represented Berthier in the Legislative Assembly of Quebec from 1890 to 1892 and from 1897 to 1903 as a Liberal.

He was born in Saint-Cuthbert, Canada East, the son of Théophile Chênevert and Mathilde Filteau, and was educated in Saint-Cuthbert, at the Collège de l'Assomption, at the Collège Sainte-Marie and the Université Laval. Chênevert was called to the Quebec bar in 1883 and practised law in Saint-Cuthbert, Berthier and Montreal, in partnership with Joseph-Émery Robidoux and then Georges-Albini Lacombe. Chênevert founded La Gazette de Berthier in 1880 and was owner and editor until 1906. He was defeated by Victor Allard when he ran for reelection to the Quebec assembly in 1892. Chênevert was married twice: to Marie-Berthe-Valérie Rocher in 1884 and to Marie Melchers in 1907. In 1901, he founded Le Courrier de Sorel, also serving as editor. In the same year, he was named King's Counsel. He resigned his seat in the Quebec assembly in 1903 after being named recorder for the Quebec Court of Appeal in Montreal district. Chênevert died in Berther at the age of 61.
