= Jean-Louis Martin (politician) =

Canadian politician

Jean-Louis Martin (February 1823 – December 16, 1861) was a farmer and political figure in Quebec. He was elected to represent Montcalm in the Legislative Assembly of the Province of Canada in 1861 but died before taking his seat. His name also appears as Jean-Louis M. Martin.

He was born in Saint-Jacques-de-l'Achigan, Lower Canada, the son of Charles Martin and Marguerite Mireault. Martin was married twice: to Céline Dupuis in 1845 and to Félicité Prud'homme in 1854. He died at Saint-Jacques-de-l'Achigan at the age of 38.

His sons Joseph-Alcide and Louis-Gustave both represented Montcalm in the Quebec assembly.
