= Jean-Luc Migué =

Canadian economist (1933–2025)

Jean-Luc Migué (1933 – October 11, 2025) was a Canadian economist. He was a senior fellow at the Fraser Institute of Vancouver and at the Montreal Economic Institute.

== Early life and education ==
Migué was born in Saint-Jacques, Quebec in 1933. He graduated in 1953, with a cum laude mention, from the Collège de l'Assomption and held a master's degree in economics from the Université de Montréal. From 1958 to 1960, he was a research student at the London School of Economics and Political Science. In 1968, he received a PhD in economics from the American University of Washington.

== Career ==
Migué was an international expert on public choice theory. He was a professor at Université Laval and l’École nationale d’administration publique (ÉNAP), a researcher at the Bank of Canada and the Economic Council of Canada, and chairman of the academic board of the Montreal Economic Institute.

He was a member of many working groups and a consultant for several public and private organisations. He was a member of the Mont Pelerin Society and a Fellow of the Royal Society of Canada.

Migué was a member of the Canadian Economics Association, the Canadian Society of Economic Science, the Public Choice Society and the American Economic Association. Moreover, he often participated in public debates in newspapers, news magazines, and radio and television broadcasts.

== Death ==
Migué died on October 11, 2025, at the age of 92.

== Filmography ==
Migué is featured in the documentary The Encirclement in which he outlined his libertarian arguments. One of his points was that particular family allowances paid to single women raising children leads women to have children outside of marriage.

== Bibliography ==
- Le Québec d'aujourd'hui : regards d'universitaires, Montréal, HMH Hurtubise, 1971.
- Le prix de la santé, with Gérard Bélanger, Montréal, Hurtubise HMH, 1972. (Also published in English)
- Le prix du transport au Québec, with Gérard Bélanger et Michel Boucher, Québec, Éditeur officiel/Ministère des transports, 1978.
- L'économiste et la chose publique, Montréal, Presses de l'Université du Québec/Toronto, Institut d'administration publique du Canada, 1979.

=== Articles and chapters ===
Migué published numerous articles in Canadian and international journals, such as the Canadian Journal of Economics/Revue Canadienne d'Économique, the Cato Journal, the Actualité économique, the Journal of Law and Economics, the Revue économique, Public Choice, the Revue Française de Finances Publiques, Hacienda Publica Española, and the Journal des Économistes et des Études Humaines.
