= Montcalm (federal electoral district) =

Federal electoral district in Quebec, Canada

Quebec electoral district
- Interactive map of riding boundaries from the 2025 federal election

Federal electoral district
- Legislature: House of Commons
MP
Luc Thériault
Bloc Québécois
- District created: 2003
- First contested: 2004
- Last contested: 2021
- District webpage: profile, map

Demographics
- Population (2016): 107,981
- Electors (2019): 88,525
- Area (km²): 906
- Pop. density (per km²): 119.2
- Census division(s): Les Moulins; Montcalm
- Census subdivision(s): Mascouche, Saint-Lin–Laurentides, Sainte-Julienne, L'Épiphanie, Saint-Roch-de-l'Achigan, Saint-Jacques, Saint-Liguori, Saint-Esprit, Saint-Alexis, Sainte-Marie-Salomé

Montcalm (French pronunciation: [mɔ̃kalm]) is a federal electoral district in Quebec, Canada, which has been represented in the House of Commons of Canada from 1867 to 1917 and since 2004.

In the 2004 election, the Bloc Québécois won a larger percentage of the vote than in any other riding, with 71% of the vote. It held the seat until 2011, when it was defeated by the NDP.

== Geography ==
The riding is located to the northeast of the Montreal region, in the Quebec region of Lanaudière. It consists of:

- the Montcalm RCM, excepting the Municipality of Saint-Calixte;
- the cites of L'Épiphanie, as well as Mascouche.

The neighbouring ridings are Joliette—Manawan, Repentigny, Terrebonne, Rivière-du-Nord, and Les Pays-d'en-Haut.

== Demographics ==
According to the 2021 Canadian census

Ethnic groups: 92.4% White, 3.0% Black, 1.8% Indigenous, 1.0% Latin American

Languages: 92.8% French, 1.8% English, 1.0% Spanish

Religions: 66.8% Christian (59.4% Catholic, 7.4% Other), 1.2% Muslim, 31.6% none

Median income: $42,400 (2020)

Average income: $48,640 (2020)

== History ==
Montcalm riding was created by the British North America Act 1867. It was abolished in 1914 when it was merged into L'Assomption—Montcalm riding.

It was re-created in 2003 from parts of the ridings of Berthier—Montcalm, Repentigny, and Terrebonne—Blainville.

This riding lost territory to Terrebonne and gained some territory from Repentigny during the 2012 electoral redistribution.

Following the 2022 Canadian federal electoral redistribution, it lost Saint-Calixte to Les Pays-d'en-Haut.

=== Members of Parliament ===
This riding has elected the following members of Parliament:

| Parliament | Years | Member | Party |
|---|---|---|---|
Montcalm
| 1st | 1867–1871 | Joseph Dufresne | Conservative |
| 1st | 1871–1872 | Firmin Dugas | Conservative |
| 2nd | 1872–1874 | Firmin Dugas | Conservative |
| 3rd | 1874–1878 | Firmin Dugas | Conservative |
| 4th | 1878–1882 | Firmin Dugas | Conservative |
| 5th | 1882–1887 | Firmin Dugas | Conservative |
| 6th | 1887–1891 | Olaüs Thérien | Conservative |
| 7th | 1891–1892 | Joseph Louis Euclide Dugas | Conservative |
| 7th | 1892–1896 | Joseph Louis Euclide Dugas | Conservative |
| 8th | 1896–1900 | Joseph Louis Euclide Dugas | Conservative |
| 9th | 1900–1904 | François Octave Dugas | Liberal |
| 10th | 1904–1908 | François Octave Dugas | Liberal |
| 11th | 1908–1909 | François Octave Dugas | Liberal |
| 11th | 1909–1911 | David Arthur Lafortune | Independent Liberal |
| 12th | 1911–1917 | David Arthur Lafortune | Liberal |
Riding dissolved into L'Assomption—Montcalm
Riding re-created from Berthier—Montcalm, Repentigny and Terrebonne—Blainville
| 38th | 2004–2006 | Roger Gaudet | Bloc Québécois |
| 39th | 2006–2008 | Roger Gaudet | Bloc Québécois |
| 40th | 2008–2011 | Roger Gaudet | Bloc Québécois |
| 41st | 2011–2014 | Manon Perreault | New Democratic |
| 41st | 2014–2015 | Manon Perreault | Independent |
| 41st | 2015–2015 | Manon Perreault | Strength in Democracy |
| 42nd | 2015–2018 | Luc Thériault | Bloc Québécois |
| 42nd | 2018–2018 | Luc Thériault | Groupe parlementaire québécois |
| 42nd | 2018–2019 | Luc Thériault | Bloc Québécois |
| 43rd | 2019–2021 | Luc Thériault | Bloc Québécois |
| 44th | 2021–2025 | Luc Thériault | Bloc Québécois |
| 45th | 2025–present | Luc Thériault | Bloc Québécois |

== Election results ==
=== 2004–present ===
View source data.
Graph of election results in Montcalm (minor parties that never got 2% of the vote or didn't run consistently are omitted)

2025 Canadian federal election
| Party | Candidate | Votes | % | ±% | Expenditures |
|---|---|---|---|---|---|
| Bloc Québécois | Luc Thériault | 27,268 | 46.60 | −6.62 | $37,243.06 |
| Liberal | Fatima Badran | 15,769 | 26.95 | +6.97 | $4,455.21 |
| Conservative | Jean-Sébastien Lepage | 13,589 | 23.22 | +11.54 | $1,976.87 |
| New Democratic | Denis Perreault | 1,893 | 3.23 | −3.04 | $0.00 |
| Total valid votes/expense limit | | 58,519 | 97.84 | – | $138,742.89 |
| Total rejected ballots | | 1,291 | 2.16 | | |
| Turnout | | 59,810 | 64.10 | | |
| Eligible voters | | 93,303 | | | |
| Bloc Québécois notional hold | | Swing | | −6.80 | |
Source: Elections Canada
Note: number of eligible voters does not include voting day registrations.

2021 federal election redistributed results
| Party | Vote | % |
|---|---|---|
| Bloc Québécois | 25,917 | 53.22 |
| Liberal | 9,730 | 19.98 |
| Conservative | 5,686 | 11.68 |
| New Democratic | 3,054 | 6.27 |
| People's | 2,085 | 4.28 |
| Green | 1,244 | 2.55 |
| Others | 984 | 2.02 |

2021 Canadian federal election
| Party | Candidate | Votes | % | ±% | Expenditures |
|---|---|---|---|---|---|
| Bloc Québécois | Luc Thériault | 27,378 | 53.2 | -4.8 | $28,966.29 |
| Liberal | Javeria Qureshi | 10,196 | 19.8 | -0.6 | $5,445.75 |
| Conservative | Gisèle Desroches | 6,011 | 11.7 | +2.7 | $6,098.27 |
| New Democratic | Oulai B. Goué | 3,218 | 6.3 | -0.1 | $287.44 |
| People's | Bruno Beaudry | 2,258 | 4.4 | +3.4 | $0.00 |
| Green | Mathieu Goyette | 1,317 | 2.6 | -1.8 | $0.00 |
| Free | Robert Bellerose | 1,074 | 2.1 | N/A | $0.00 |
| Total valid votes/expense limit | | 51,452 | 97.5 | – | $120,692.56 |
| Total rejected ballots | | 1,337 | 2.5 | | |
| Turnout | | 52,789 | 57.0 | | |
| Eligible voters | | 92,547 | | | |
| Bloc Québécois hold | | Swing | | +2.1 | |
Source: Elections Canada

2019 Canadian federal election
| Party | Candidate | Votes | % | ±% | Expenditures |
|---|---|---|---|---|---|
| Bloc Québécois | Luc Thériault | 31,791 | 58.01 | +21.40 | $43,460.97 |
| Liberal | Isabel Sayegh | 11,200 | 20.44 | -6.88 | $33,958.89 |
| Conservative | Gisèle DesRoches | 4,942 | 9.02 | -0.59 | none listed |
| New Democratic | Julian Bonello-Stauch | 3,514 | 6.41 | -17.04 | $0.10 |
| Green | Mathieu Goyette | 2,416 | 4.41 | +2.57 | none listed |
| People's | Hugo Clenin | 524 | 0.96 | – | none listed |
| Indépendance du Québec | Marc Labelle | 419 | 0.76 | – | $0.00 |
| Total valid votes/expense limit | | 54,806 | 100.0 | | |
| Total rejected ballots | | 1,311 | 1.48 | -0.72 | |
| Turnout | | 56,117 | 63.39 | -1.53 | |
| Eligible voters | | 88,525 | | | |
| Bloc Québécois hold | | Swing | | +14.14 | |
Source: Elections Canada

2015 Canadian federal election
| Party | Candidate | Votes | % | ±% | Expenditures |
|---|---|---|---|---|---|
| Bloc Québécois | Luc Thériault | 19,405 | 36.61 | +5.17 | $17,567.65 |
| Liberal | Louis-Charles Thouin | 14,484 | 27.32 | +22.4 | $70,923.39 |
| New Democratic | Martin Leclerc | 12,431 | 23.45 | -28.45 | $65,982.01 |
| Conservative | Gisèle Desroches | 5,093 | 9.61 | +1.66 | $6,282.61 |
| Green | Yumi Yow Mei Ang | 976 | 1.84 | -1.95 | – |
| Strength in Democracy | Manon Perreault | 620 | 1.17 | –51.80 | $4,015.36 |
| Total valid votes/expense limit | | 53,009 | 100.0 | | $220,941.63 |
| Total rejected ballots | | 1,226 | 2.20 | +0.41 | |
| Turnout | | 54,235 | 64.92 | +3.16 | |
| Eligible voters | | 83,532 | | | |
| Bloc Québécois notional gain from Strength in Democracy | | Swing | | +16.78 | |
Source: Elections Canada

2011 federal election redistributed results
| Party | Vote | % |
|---|---|---|
| New Democratic | 23,228 | 51.90 |
| Bloc Québécois | 14,070 | 31.44 |
| Conservative | 3,556 | 7.95 |
| Liberal | 2,204 | 4.92 |
| Green | 1,697 | 3.79 |

2011 Canadian federal election
| Party | Candidate | Votes | % | ±% |
|---|---|---|---|---|
| New Democratic | Manon Perreault | 34,434 | 52.97 | +39.12 |
| Bloc Québécois | Roger Gaudet | 19,609 | 30.16 | -25.52 |
| Conservative | Jason Fuoco | 5,118 | 7.87 | -5.58 |
| Liberal | Yves Dufour | 3,501 | 5.39 | -8.55 |
| Green | Marianne Girard | 2,347 | 3.61 | +0.53 |
| Total valid votes | | 65,009 | 98.21 | |
| Total rejected ballots | | 1,183 | 1.79 | -0.26 |
| Turnout | | 66,192 | 61.47 | -0.26 |
| Eligible voters | | 107,677 | – | – |
| New Democratic gain from Bloc Québécois | | Swing | | +32.32 |

2008 Canadian federal election
| Party | Candidate | Votes | % | ±% | Expenditures |
|---|---|---|---|---|---|
| Bloc Québécois | Roger Gaudet | 33,519 | 55.69 | -6.59 | $73,797 |
| Liberal | David Grégoire | 8,387 | 13.93 | +5.66 | $7,023 |
| New Democratic | Marie-Josée Beauchamp | 8,337 | 13.85 | +7.14 | none listed |
| Conservative | Claude Marc Boudreau | 8,096 | 13.45 | -5.81 | $79,804 |
| Green | Michel Paulette | 1,854 | 3.08 | -0.40 | $722 |
| Total valid votes | | 60,193 | 97.89 | | |
| Total rejected ballots | | 1,296 | 2.11 | +0.03 | |
| Turnout | | 61,489 | 61.73 | -1.86 | |
| Electors on the lists | | 99,604 | | | |
| Bloc Québécois hold | | Swing | | -6.13 | |
Sources: Official Results, Elections Canada and Financial Returns, Elections Canada.

2006 Canadian federal election
| Party | Candidate | Votes | % | ±% | Expenditures |
|---|---|---|---|---|---|
| Bloc Québécois | Roger Gaudet | 34,975 | 62.28 | -8.96 | |
| Conservative | Michel Paulette | 10,818 | 19.26 | +13.40 | $6,764 |
| Liberal | Luc Fortin | 4,645 | 8.27 | -8.13 | $9,690 |
| New Democratic | Nancy Leclerc | 3,766 | 6.71 | +3.53 | $0 |
| Green | Wendy Gorchinsky | 1,954 | 3.48 | +0.15 | |
| Total | | 56,158 | 97.92 | – | $86,039 |
| Total rejected ballots | | 1,193 | 2.08 | -1.13 | |
| Turnout | | 57,351 | 63.59 | +4.38 | |
| Electors on the lists | | 90,186 | | | |
| Bloc Québécois hold | | Swing | | -11.18 | |

2004 Canadian federal election
| Party | Candidate | Votes | % | ±% | Expenditures |
|---|---|---|---|---|---|
| Bloc Québécois | Roger Gaudet | 34,383 | 71.24 | +11.78 | $61,436 |
| Liberal | Daniel Brazeau | 7,915 | 16.40 | -9.43 | $78,151 |
| Conservative | Michel Paulette | 2,831 | 5.87 | -3.82 | $3,730 |
| Green | Serge Bellemare | 1,606 | 3.33 | – | $0 |
| New Democratic | François Rivest | 1,531 | 3.17 | +1.57 | |
| Total valid votes/expense limit | | 48,266 | 96.79 | $81,149 | |
| Total rejected ballots | | 1,601 | 3.21 | | |
| Turnout | | 49,867 | 59.22 | | |
| Electors on the lists | | 84,211 | | | |
| Bloc Québécois hold | | Swing | | +10.60 | |
Percentage change figures are factored for redistribution. Conservative Party percentages are contrasted with the combined Canadian Alliance and Progressive Conservative percentages from 2000.

2000 federal election redistributed results
| Party | Vote | % |
|---|---|---|
| Bloc Québécois | 25,622 | 70.90 |
| Liberal | 4,175 | 11.55 |
| Canadian Alliance | 2,317 | 6.41 |
| Progressive Conservative | 1,858 | 5.14 |
| Marijuana | 1,478 | 4.09 |
| New Democratic | 690 | 1.91 |

=== 1867–1917 ===
1911 Canadian federal election
| Party | Candidate | Votes | % | ±% |
|---|---|---|---|---|
| Liberal | David Arthur Lafortune | 1,432 | 51.0 | +5.3 |
| Conservative | Joseph-Eugène-Edmond Marion | 1,374 | 49.0 | |
| Total valid votes | | 2,806 | 100.0 | |

Canadian federal by-election, 25 September 1909
| Party | Candidate | Votes | % | ±% |
|---|---|---|---|---|
On Mr. Dugas being appointed Judge of the Quebec Superior Court, 6 September 1909
| Independent Liberal | David Arthur Lafortune | 1,256 | 54.3 | |
| Liberal | Omer Lapierre | 1,058 | 45.7 | -7.6 |
| Total valid votes | | 2,314 | 100.0 | |

1908 Canadian federal election
| Party | Candidate | Votes | % | ±% |
|---|---|---|---|---|
| Liberal | François Octave Dugas | 1,432 | 53.3 | +0.1 |
| Conservative | Joseph-Adolphe Renaud | 1,256 | 46.7 | -0.1 |
| Total valid votes | | 2,688 | 100.0 | |

1904 Canadian federal election
| Party | Candidate | Votes | % | ±% |
|---|---|---|---|---|
| Liberal | François Octave Dugas | 1,227 | 53.2 | -1.0 |
| Conservative | J.E.E. Marion | 1,079 | 46.8 | +1.0 |
| Total valid votes | | 2,306 | 100.0 | |

1900 Canadian federal election
| Party | Candidate | Votes | % | ±% |
|---|---|---|---|---|
| Liberal | François Octave Dugas | 1,212 | 54.2 | +11.2 |
| Conservative | Louis Euclide Dugas | 1,024 | 45.8 | -11.2 |
| Total valid votes | | 2,236 | 100.0 | |

1896 Canadian federal election
| Party | Candidate | Votes | % |
|---|---|---|---|
| Conservative | Joseph-Louis-Euclide Dugas | 1,202 | 57.0 |
| Liberal | Louis Victor Labelle | 907 | 43.0 |
| Total valid votes | | 2,109 | 100.0 |

By-election on 5 March 1892 On election being declared void, 28 January 1892
| Party | Candidate | Votes |
| Conservative | Joseph-Louis-Euclide Dugas | acclaimed |

1891 Canadian federal election
| Party | Candidate | Votes | % | ±% |
|---|---|---|---|---|
| Conservative | Louis Dugas | 673 | 37.0 | |
| Conservative | Olaüs Thérien | 632 | 34.7 | -18.6 |
| Conservative | Octave Magnan | 516 | 28.3 | |
| Total valid votes | | 1,821 | 100.0 | |

1887 Canadian federal election
| Party | Candidate | Votes | % | ±% |
|---|---|---|---|---|
| Conservative | Olaüs Thérien | 953 | 53.3 | +2.8 |
| Nationalist | Firmin Dugas | 835 | 46.7 | |
| Total valid votes | | 1,788 | 100.0 | |

1882 Canadian federal election
| Party | Candidate | Votes | % | ±% |
|---|---|---|---|---|
| Conservative | Firmin Dugas | 828 | 50.5 | +0.6 |
| Unknown | Octave Magnan | 812 | 49.5 | |
| Total valid votes | | 1,640 | 100.0 | |

1878 Canadian federal election
| Party | Candidate | Votes | % |
|---|---|---|---|
| Conservative | Firmin Dugas | 698 | 49.9 |
| Unknown | N. Forest | 374 | 26.8 |
| Unknown | I.B. Deslongchamp | 240 | 17.2 |
| Unknown | V.J.E. Brouillet | 86 | 6.2 |
| Total valid votes | | 1,398 | 100.0 |

1874 Canadian federal election
| Party | Candidate | Votes |
|---|---|---|
| Conservative | Firmin Dugas | acclaimed |
Source: lop.parl.ca

1872 Canadian federal election
| Party | Candidate | Votes |
|---|---|---|
| Conservative | Firmin Dugas | acclaimed |
Source: Canadian Elections Database

By-election on 15 September 1871 On Mr. Dufresne's resignation, to become Sheriff of the County of St. John, 13 July 1871
| Party | Candidate | Votes |
| Conservative | Firmin Dugas | acclaimed |

1867 Canadian federal election
| Party | Candidate | Votes |
|---|---|---|
| Conservative | Joseph Dufresne | acclaimed |
Source: Canadian Elections Database

== See also ==
- List of Canadian electoral districts
- Historical federal electoral districts of Canada
