= Montcalm (provincial electoral district) =

Quebec electoral district

Defunct provincial electoral district
- Legislature: National Assembly of Quebec
- District created: 1867
- District abolished: 1972
- First contested: 1867
- Last contested: 1970

Montcalm (French pronunciation: [mɔ̃kalm]) was a provincial electoral district in the Lanaudière region of Quebec, Canada that elected members to the National Assembly of Quebec.

It was created for the 1867 election (and an electoral district of that name existed earlier in the Legislative Assembly of the Province of Canada). Its final election was in 1970. It disappeared in the 1973 election and its successor electoral district was Joliette-Montcalm.

Montcalm was named in honour of Louis-Joseph de Montcalm, a French general who led the French side at the Battle of the Plains of Abraham.

== Members of the Legislative Assembly / National Assembly ==
- Firmin Dugas, Conservative Party (1867–1874)
- Louis-Gustave Martin, Conservative Party (1874–1878)
- Octave Magnan, Conservative Party (1878–1881)
- Jean-Baptiste-Trefflé Richard, Conservative Party (1881–1886)
- Louis-Olivier Taillon, Conservative Party (1886–1890)
- Joseph-Alcide Martin, Conservative Party (1890–1892)
- Octave Magnan, Conservative Party (1892–1897)
- Pierre-Julien-Léonidas Bissonnette, Liberal (1897–1908)
- Joseph Sylvestre, Conservative Party (1908–1916)
- Joseph-Alcide Dupuis, Liberal (1916–1917)
- Joseph-Ferdinand Daniel, Liberal (1917–1929)
- Joseph-Léonide Perron, Liberal (1929–1931)
- Médéric Duval, Liberal (1931–1935)
- Jean-Gaétan Daniel, Liberal (1935–1936)
- Maurice Tellier, Union Nationale (1936–1939)
- Joseph-Odilon Duval, Liberal (1939–1944)
- Maurice Tellier, Union Nationale (1944–1962)
- Gérard Martin, Liberal (1962–1966)
- Marcel Masse, Union Nationale (1966–1973)
