= Collège de l'Assomption =

School in Quebec, Canada

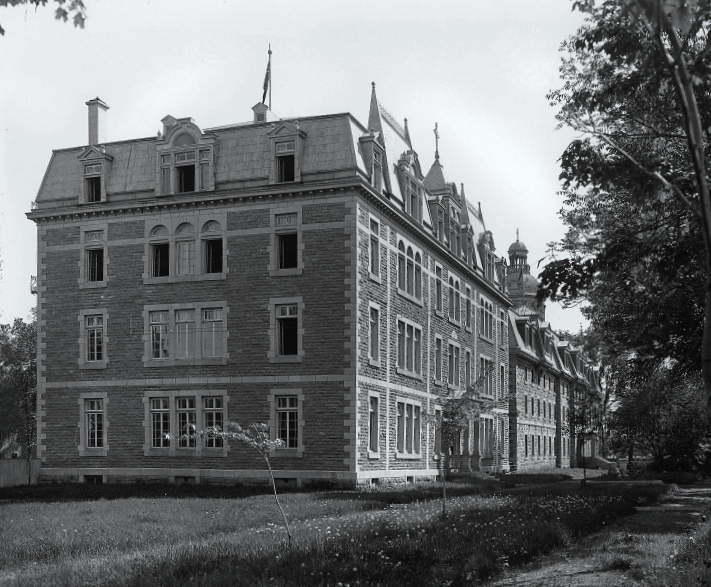
1908 photograph of the Collège de l'Assomption

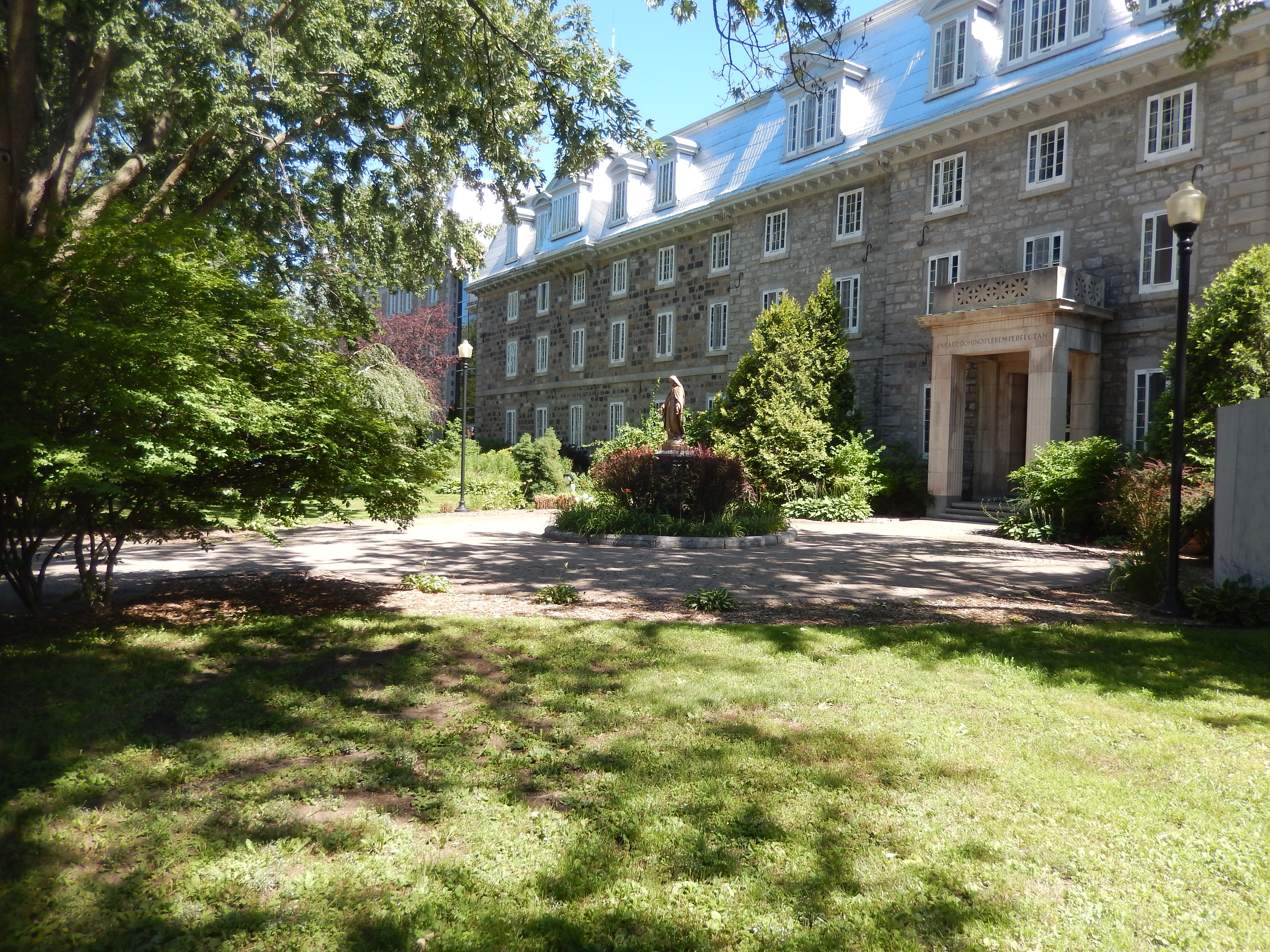
2020 photograph of the Collège de l'Assomption

Collège de l'Assomption (English: College of the Assumption) is a private secondary school located in the municipality of L'Assomption near Montreal. It was founded in 1832 by Jean-Baptiste Meilleur. Meilleur served as the first superintendent of education for Lower Canada from 1842 to 1855. Canada's seventh prime minister, Wilfrid Laurier, is an alumnus of the school. In 1864 a book on the history of the school, Annales historiques du Collège de l'Assomption depuis sa fondation by Canadian journalist Arthur Dansereau, was published by Eusèbe Senécal. A second history of the college, Histoire du Collège de l'Assomption by Anastase Forget, was published in 1933 by Imprimerie populaire; an imprint of Le Devoir.

== Alumni ==
- Victor Allard (1860–1931), lawyer, judge, and politician
- Alexandre Archambault (1829–1879), lawyer and politician
- Horace Archambeault (1857–1918), politician, judge, and law professor
- Joseph-Alfred Archambeault (1859–1913), Roman Catholic priest and bishop
- Bernard Bissonnette (1898–1964), lawyer, merchant, educator, judge and politician
- Raymond Brouillet (born 1933), politician
- Jean-Baptiste Brousseau (1841–1925), lawyer, journalist and politician
- Louis-Pierre-Paul Cardin (1840–1917), notary and politician
- Francis Cassidy (1827–1873), lawyer and politician
- Ovide Charlebois (1862–1933), vicar and missionary
- Cuthbert-Alphonse Chênevert (1859–1920), lawyer and politician
- Firmin Dugas (1830–1889), politician and businessman who served in the Parliament of Canada
- Ludger Forest (1826–1903), physician and politician
- Amédée Geoffrion (1867–1935), lawyer and politician
- Joseph Pierre Octave Guilbault (1870–1924), notary and politician
- Louis-Amable Jetté (1836–1920), lawyer, politician, judge, and professor
- Albert Lacombe (1827–1916), Roman Catholic missionary
- Joseph Lafontaine (1865–1920), farmer and politician
- Joseph Lafontaine (1829–1907), notary, journalist, and politician
- David Arthur Lafortune (1848–1922), lawyer and politician
- Achille Larose (1839–1904), farmer and politician
- Ruben Charles Laurier (1868–1947), physician and politician
- Wilfrid Laurier (1841–1919), the seventh prime minister of Canada
- Joseph Marion (1837–1923), politician and notary
- Oscar Martel (1848–1924), violinist, composer, and music educator
- Joseph-Alcide Martin (1858–1922), surveyor, civil engineer and politician
- Louis-Gustave Martin (1846–1879), architect and politician
- Joseph-Norbert-Alfred McConville (1839–1912), lawyer, newspaper owner, and politician
- Roch Moïse Samuel Mignault (1837–1913), physician and politician
- Jean-Luc Migué (born 1933), economist
- Louis-Siméon Morin (1831–1879), lawyer and politician
- Joseph Papin (1825–1862), lawyer and politician
- Louis Conrad Pelletier (1852–1929), lawyer and politician
- Onésime Pelletier (1833–1881), physician and politician
- Jacques Picard (1828–1905), notary and politician
- Eugène-Urgel Piché (1824–1894), lawyer and politician
- Wilfrid Prévost (1832–1898), lawyer and politician
- Jean-Baptiste-Trefflé Richard (1856–1927), farmer, notary and politician
- Louis-Joseph Riopel (1841–1915), lawyer, notary and politician
- Paul-Arthur Séguin (1875–1946), politician and notary
- Louis Sylvestre (1832–1914), politician and farmer

== Academic staff ==
- Alexis Contant (1858–1918), composer, organist, pianist, and educator
- Jean-Baptiste Meilleur (1796–1878), medical doctor, educator, politician, and founder of Collège de l'Assomption
