= Pierre-Julien-Léonidas Bissonnette =

Canadian politician

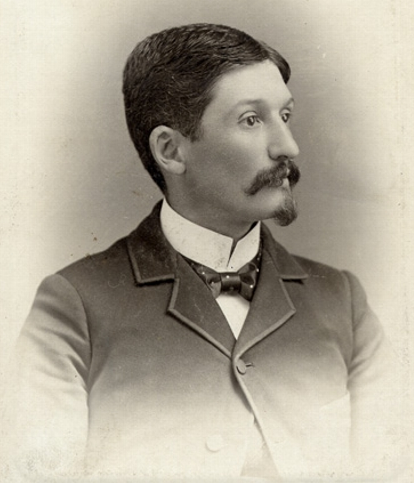

Member of the Canadian Parliament for Montcalm
- In office 1897–1908
- Preceded by: Octave Magnan
- Succeeded by: Joseph Sylvestre

Personal details
- Born: February 25, 1861 La Prairie, Canada East
- Died: May 11, 1914 (aged 53) Saint-Esprit, Quebec
- Party: Liberal
- Children: Bernard Bissonnette

Pierre-Julien-Léonidas Bissonnette (February 25, 1861 – May 11, 1914) was a physician and political figure in Quebec. He represented Montcalm in the Legislative Assembly of Quebec from 1897 to 1908 as a Liberal.

He was born in La Prairie, Canada East, the son of Pierre Bissonnette and Esther Gélineau. He was educated at the Victoria medical school in Montreal, qualified as a physician in 1887 and set up practice in Saint-Esprit. In 1889, he married Juliette Lamarche. He was governor of the Quebec College of Physicians and Surgeons. Bissonnette served twelves years as a member of the provincial board of hygiene. He was defeated when he ran for reelection in 1908. Bissonnette was registrar for Montcalm County from 1908 to 1914. He died at Saint-Esprit at the age of 53.

His son Bernard also served in the Quebec assembly.
