= Saint-Jacques, Quebec (village municipality) =

District in Canada

the village municipality of Saint-Jacques (French pronunciation: [sɛ̃ ʒak]) is a former village now part of the current municipality of Saint-Jacques, Quebec, Canada.

Prior to February 4, 1998, the village of Saint-Jacques was an independent municipality; on that date, it and the parish of Saint-Jacques were merged into the new municipality of Saint-Jacques.

== History ==
The sector was originally part of the parish of Saint-Jacques. In 1912, the sector became an independent municipality under the name of Saint-Jacques-de-l'Achigan. In 1917, the municipality changed its name to simply Saint-Jacques. In 1987, the village was merged with the parish to create the current municipality of Saint-Jacques.

== Demographics ==
Historical census populations – Saint-Jacques (Village)

Year	Pop.	±%
1921	1,332	—
1931	1,529	+14.8%
1941	1,634	+6.9%
1951	1,729	+5.8%
1956	1,979	+14.5%

Year	Pop.	±%
1961	2,038	+3.0%
1966	2,000	−1.9%
1971	1,975	−1.2%
1976	2,095	+6.1%
1981	2,152	+2.7%

Year	Pop.	±%
1986	2,153	+0.0%
1991	2,251	+4.6%
1996	2,261	+0.4%

Source: Statistics Canada
