= Olaüs Thérien =

Canadian politician

Member of the Canadian Parliament for Montcalm
- In office 1887–1891
- Preceded by: Firmin Dugas
- Succeeded by: Joseph Louis Euclide Dugas

Personal details
- Born: September 3, 1860 Ste-Anne-des-Plaines, Canada East
- Died: December 31, 1929 (aged 69)
- Party: Conservative

Olaüs Thérien (September 3, 1860 – December 31, 1929) was a Canadian lawyer, editor and political figure in Quebec, Canada. He represented Montcalm in the House of Commons of Canada from 1887 to 1891 as a Conservative member.

He was born in Ste-Anne-des-Plaines, Canada East, the son of Pierre Thérien and Claire Derouin, and was educated at the Petit Séminaire de Saint-Thérèse and Université Laval. He was called to the Quebec bar in 1885. Thérien was defeated when he ran for reelection in 1891.

1891 Canadian federal election: Montcalm
Party	Candidate	Votes	%	±%
Conservative	Louis Dugas	673	37.0	
Conservative	Olaüs Thérien	632	34.7	-18.6
Conservative	Octave Magnan	516	28.3	
Total valid votes		1,821	100.0	

1887 Canadian federal election: Montcalm
Party	Candidate	Votes	%	±%
Conservative	Olaüs Thérien	953	53.3	+2.8
Nationalist	Firmin Dugas	835	46.7	
Total valid votes		1,788	100.0	
