= Bernard Bissonnette =

Canadian politician

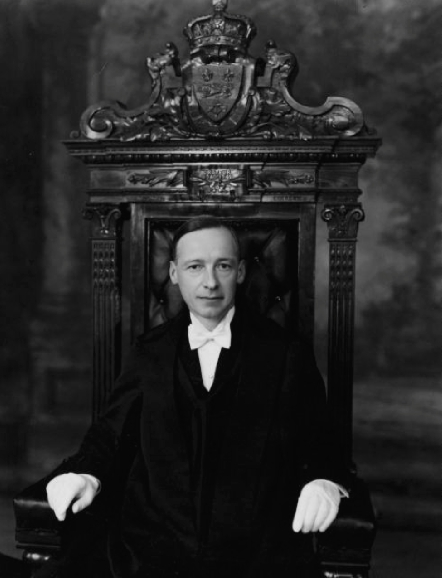

Member of the Legislative Assembly of Quebec for L'Assomption
- In office 1939–1944
- Preceded by: Adhémar Raynault
- Succeeded by: Victor-Stanislas Chartrand

22nd Speaker of the Legislative Assembly of Quebec
- In office 1940–1942
- Preceded by: Paul Sauvé
- Succeeded by: Valmore Bienvenue

Personal details
- Born: January 15, 1898 Saint-Esprit, Quebec
- Died: November 11, 1964 (aged 66) Montreal, Quebec
- Resting place: Notre Dame des Neiges Cemetery
- Party: Liberal
- Spouse: Jacqueline Masson
- Relations: Pierre-Julien-Léonidas Bissonnette, father

Bernard Bissonnette (January 15, 1898 – November 11, 1964) was a lawyer, merchant, educator, judge and political figure in Quebec. He represented L'Assomption in the Legislative Assembly of Quebec from 1939 to 1944 as a Liberal. Bissonnette was Speaker of the Legislative Assembly from 1940 to 1942.

== Early life ==
He was born in Saint-Esprit, Quebec, the son of Pierre-Julien-Léonidas Bissonnette and Juliette Lamarche. Bissonnette was educated at the Collège de l'Assomption and the Université de Montréal.

== Career ==
He articled in law with Amédée Monet, was called to the Quebec bar in 1920 and set up practice in Montréal. He later practised in partnership with Honoré Mercier and with Roch Pinard. In 1931, he was named King's Counsel. He was a co-founder of the L'Assomption Shoe company. He resigned his seat in 1942 after he was named to the Court of King's Bench.

He taught constitutional law and civil law in the law faculty of the Université de Montréal. Bissonnette was secretary of the Barreau de Montréal in 1927. In 1935, he married Jacqueline Masson.

Bissonnette died in Montreal at the age of 66 and was buried in the Notre Dame des Neiges Cemetery.
