= Joseph-Odilon Duval =

Canadian politician

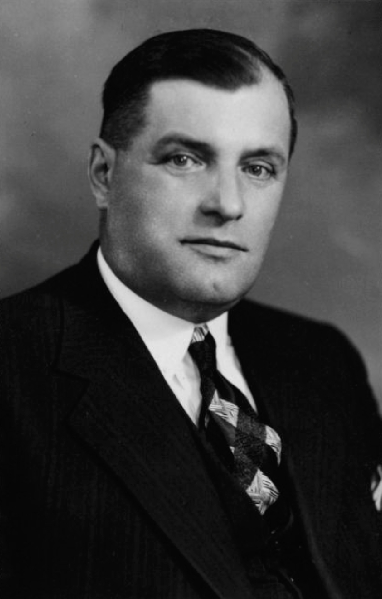

Member of the Legislative Assembly of Quebec for Montcalm
- In office 1939–1944
- Preceded by: Maurice Tellier
- Succeeded by: Maurice Tellier

Personal details
- Born: May 13, 1895 Saint-Calixte, Quebec
- Died: March 16, 1966 (aged 70) Saint-Calixte, Quebec
- Party: Liberal
- Relations: Médéric Duval, father

Joseph-Odilon Duval (May 13, 1895 – March 16, 1966) was a Canadian politician.

Born in Saint-Calixte, Quebec, Duval was the member of the Legislative Assembly of Quebec for Montcalm from 1939 to 1944.
