= Louis-Gustave Martin =

Canadian politician

Louis-Gustave Martin (August 22, 1846 – September 5, 1879) was an architect and political figure in Quebec. He represented Montcalm in the Legislative Assembly of Quebec from 1874 to 1878 as a Conservative.

He was born in Saint Jacques, Canada East, the son of Jean-Louis Martin and Céline Dupuis. He was educated at the Collège de l'Assomption and the École Polytechnique de Montréal. Martin was a member of the firm Poitras et Martin in Montreal. He designed the Sainte-Brigide de Kildare church Martin was elected to the legislative assembly in an 1874 by-election held after Firmin Dugas resigned his seat after it became illegal to hold seats in both the Quebec assembly and the House of Commons. Martin was reelected in 1875 but was defeated when he ran for reelection in 1878. He died in Saint-Jacques at the age of 33.

His brother Joseph-Alcide also represented Montcalm in the Quebec assembly.
