= Joseph-Alcide Martin =

Canadian politician

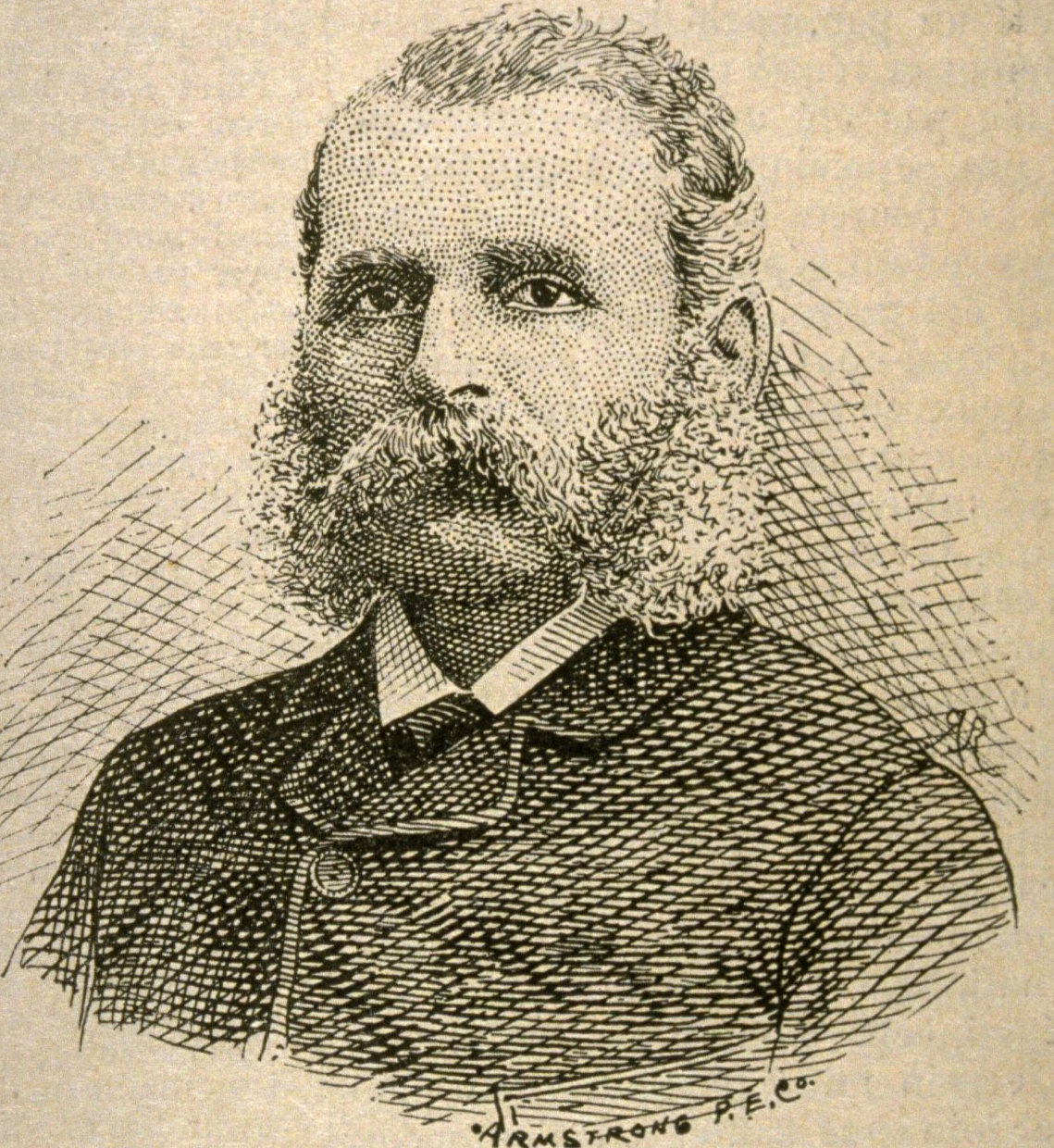
Dr Joseph-Alcide Martin

Joseph-Alcide Martin (June 27, 1858 – September 7, 1922) was a surveyor, civil engineer and political figure in Quebec. He represented Montcalm in

the Legislative Assembly of Quebec from 1890 to 1892 as a Conservative.

He was born in Saint-Jacques, the son of Jean-Louis Martin and Félicité Prud'homme. Martin was educated at the Collège de l'Assomption and the École Polytechnique de Montréal. He lived in Montreal until 1890, when he moved to Joliette. In 1888, he married Marie-Anne Grignon. He was named a land agent at Joliette in 1895. Martin was official engineer for the municipality of Joliette from 1904 to 1922. He also served as president of the Saint Vincent de Paul Society. He died in Joliette at the age of 64.

His brother Louis-Gustave had also represented Montcalm in the Quebec assembly.
