= Eugène-Urgel Piché =

Canadian lawyer and politician

Eugène-Urgel Piché, QC (July 13, 1824 – March 8, 1894) was a lawyer and political figure in Canada East. He represented Berthier in the Legislative Assembly of the Province of Canada from 1858 to 1861.

He was born Amable-Eugène-Bonaventure Piché in Saint-Sulpice, the son of Bonaventure Piché and Émilie Lefebvre. Piché was educated at the Collège de l'Assomption, studied law in Montreal with Norbert Dumas and was admitted to the Quebec bar in 1845. In 1846, he married Marie-Célina "Nina" Marion. In 1855, Piché served as mayor of Berthier and prefect of the county. He was defeated when he ran for reelection to the assembly in 1861. He served as crown prosecutor for the Court of Queen's Bench from 1864 to 1871. In 1867, Piché was named Queen's Counsel. He was admitted to the Manitoba bar in 1872. He served as assistant clerk for the Canadian House of Commons from 1873 to 1879, when he returned to the practice of law in Montreal. Piché was an unsuccessful candidate for a seat in the Quebec assembly in 1886. He died in Lanoraie at the age of 69.
