= Saint-Jacques, Quebec (parish municipality) =

District in Canada

The parish municipality of Saint-Jacques (French pronunciation: [sɛ̃ ʒak]) is a former parish municipality now part of the current regular municipality of Saint-Jacques, Quebec, Canada.

Prior to February 4, 1998, the parish of Saint-Jacques was an independent municipality; on that date, it and the village of Saint-Jacques were merged into the new municipality of Saint-Jacques.

== History ==
The parish was founded in 1855 on territory that was commonly known as Saint-Jacques-de-Saint-Sulpice. In 1912, the more urban sector split to became the village municipality of Saint-Jacques-de-l'Achigan. Those two territories were then merged one again, in 1998, for the creation of the current Saint-Jacques.

== Demographics ==
Historical census populations – Saint-Jacques Parish (1855–1998)

| Year | Pop. | ±% |
|---|---|---|
| 1871 | 2,754 | — |
| 1881 | 2,975 | +8.0% |
| 1891 | 2,423 | −18.6% |
| 1901 | 2,580 | +6.5% |
| 1911 | 2,753 | +6.7% |
| 1921 | 1,714 | −37.7% |

| Year | Pop. | ±% |
|---|---|---|
| 1931 | 1,356 | −20.9% |
| 1941 | 1,339 | −1.3% |
| 1951 | 1,429 | +6.7% |
| 1956 | 1,459 | +2.1% |
| 1961 | 1,447 | −0.8% |
| 1966 | 1,494 | +3.2% |

| Year | Pop. | ±% |
|---|---|---|
| 1971 | 1,472 | −1.5% |
| 1976 | 1,434 | −2.6% |
| 1981 | 1,580 | +10.2% |
| 1986 | 1,564 | −1.0% |
| 1991 | 1,542 | −1.4% |
| 1996 | 1,554 | +0.8% |

Source: Statistics Canada
