= Alexandre Archambault =

Canadian politician and lawyer

Alexandre Archambault (French pronunciation: [alɛksɑ̃dʁ aʁʃɑ̃bo]; June 7, 1829 – July 12, 1879) was a Canadian politician and lawyer in Canada East. He represented L'Assomption in the Legislative Assembly of the Province of Canada from 1861 to 1863.

He was born Alexandre-Amable Archambeault in L'Assomption, the son of Amable Archambeault and Madeleine Bruguière, was educated at the Collège de l'Assomption and articled in law in Montreal with Joseph Papin and was called to the Quebec bar in 1851, setting up practice in L'Assomption. Archambault also served as a captain in the militia, was mayor of L'Assomption from 1858 to 1870 and was county prefect for two terms. In 1852, he married Léocadie Homier. He was defeated when he ran for reelection to the assembly in 1863. He died in L'Assomption at the age of 50.

His brother Pierre-Urgel Archambault also served in the assembly and was a member of the Canadian House of Commons. His daughter Eugénie married Henri-Benjamin Rainville.
