= Joseph Dufresne =

Canadian politician

Joseph Dufresne (February 2, 1805 – November 5, 1873) was a Quebec notary and political figure. He was a Conservative member of the House of Commons of Canada representing Montcalm from 1867 to 1871.

He was born in Saint-Paul-de-Lavaltrie, Lower Canada in 1805. He qualified as a notary in 1834 and set up practice in Saint-Jacques-de-l'Achigan, then Saint-Lin, Saint-Alexis and finally Montreal. In 1854, he was elected to the 5th Parliament of the Province of Canada for Montcalm; he was re-elected in 1858 but defeated by Jean-Louis Martin in 1861. When Martin died before taking his seat, Dufresne was elected to the seat in a by-election in February 1862. He was re-elected in 1863 and, in 1867, was elected to the Parliament of Canada in the same riding. He resigned in 1871, when he was appointed sheriff for Saint-Jean County.

He died two years later at Saint-Jean-sur-Richelieu.

1867 Canadian federal election: Montcalm
Party	Candidate	Votes
Conservative	Joseph Dufresne	acclaimed
Source: Canadian Elections Database

Parliament of Canada
Preceded by None	Member of Parliament from Montcalm; 1867–1871	Succeeded by Firmin Dugas
