= Maurice Tellier =

Canadian politician

Member of the Legislative Assembly of Quebec for Montcalm
- In office 1936–1939
- Preceded by: Jean-Gaétan Daniel
- Succeeded by: Joseph-Odilon Duval
- In office 1944–1962
- Preceded by: Joseph-Odilon Duval
- Succeeded by: Gérard Martin

President of the Legislative Assembly of Quebec
- In office December 15, 1955 – September 20, 1960
- Preceded by: Alexandre Taché
- Succeeded by: Lucien Cliche

Personal details
- Born: June 14, 1896 Joliette, Quebec
- Died: March 28, 1966 (aged 69) Montreal, Quebec
- Party: Union Nationale
- Relations: Louis Tellier, uncle

Maurice Tellier (French pronunciation: [mɔʁis tɛlje]; June 14, 1896 – March 28, 1966) was a lawyer and political figure in Quebec. He represented Montcalm in the Legislative Assembly of Quebec from 1936 to 1939 and from 1944 to 1962 as a Union Nationale member. Tellier was Speaker of the Legislative Assembly from 1955 to 1960.

He was born in Joliette, Quebec, the son of Joseph-Mathias Tellier and Maria Désilets. Tellier was educated at the Séminaire de Joliette, the Université de Montréal and in Toronto, where he articled with C.M. Heclick. He was admitted to the Quebec bar in 1922 and set up practice in Joliette, in partnership with his fellow future legislator Maurice Majeau, among others. In 1923, Tellier married Éva Bouvier. He was named King's Counsel in 1938.

Tellier ran unsuccessfully for a seat in the Quebec assembly as a Conservative in 1935; he also suffered defeats when he ran for reelection to the Quebec assembly in 1939 and in 1962. He was bâtonnier for the Laurentides area from 1957 to 1959.

He died in Montreal at the age of 69 and was buried in Joliette.

His uncle Louis Tellier was a member of the House of Commons.
