= Joseph Louis Euclide Dugas =

Canadian politician

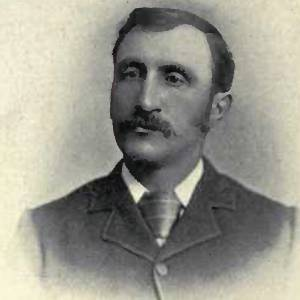

Member of the Canadian Parliament for Montcalm
- In office 1891–1900
- Preceded by: Olaüs Thérien
- Succeeded by: François Octave Dugas

Personal details
- Born: 30 August 1861 Montcalm, Canada East
- Died: 27 December 1943 (aged 82)
- Party: Conservative
- Relations: Firmin Dugas, father

Joseph-Louis-Euclide Dugas (30 August 1861 – 27 December 1943) was a farmer and political figure in Quebec. He represented Montcalm in the House of Commons of Canada from 1891 to 1900 as a Conservative member.

He was born in Montcalm, Canada East, the son of Firmin Dugas, and was educated at the Collège de Joliette and the Collège d'Ottawa. Dugas also served as a school commissioner. In 1883, he married Lizzie Rowan. Dugas' election in 1891 was overturned after an appeal but he won the by-election which followed in 1892. He was reelected in 1896 but was defeated by François Octave Dugas when he ran for reelection in 1900.

== Electoral record ==
1900 Canadian federal election: Montcalm
Party	Candidate	Votes	%	±%
Liberal	François Octave Dugas	1,212	54.2	+11.2
Conservative	Louis Euclide Dugas	1,024	45.8	-11.2
Total valid votes		2,236	100.0	

1896 Canadian federal election: Montcalm
Party	Candidate	Votes	%
Conservative	Joseph-Louis-Euclide Dugas	1,202	57.0
Liberal	Louis Victor Labelle	907	43.0
Total valid votes		2,109	100.0

By-election on 5 March 1892 On election being declared void, 28 January 1892
Party	Candidate	Votes
Conservative	Joseph-Louis-Euclide Dugas	acclaimed
