= Jean-Baptiste Dugas-Montbel =

French translator

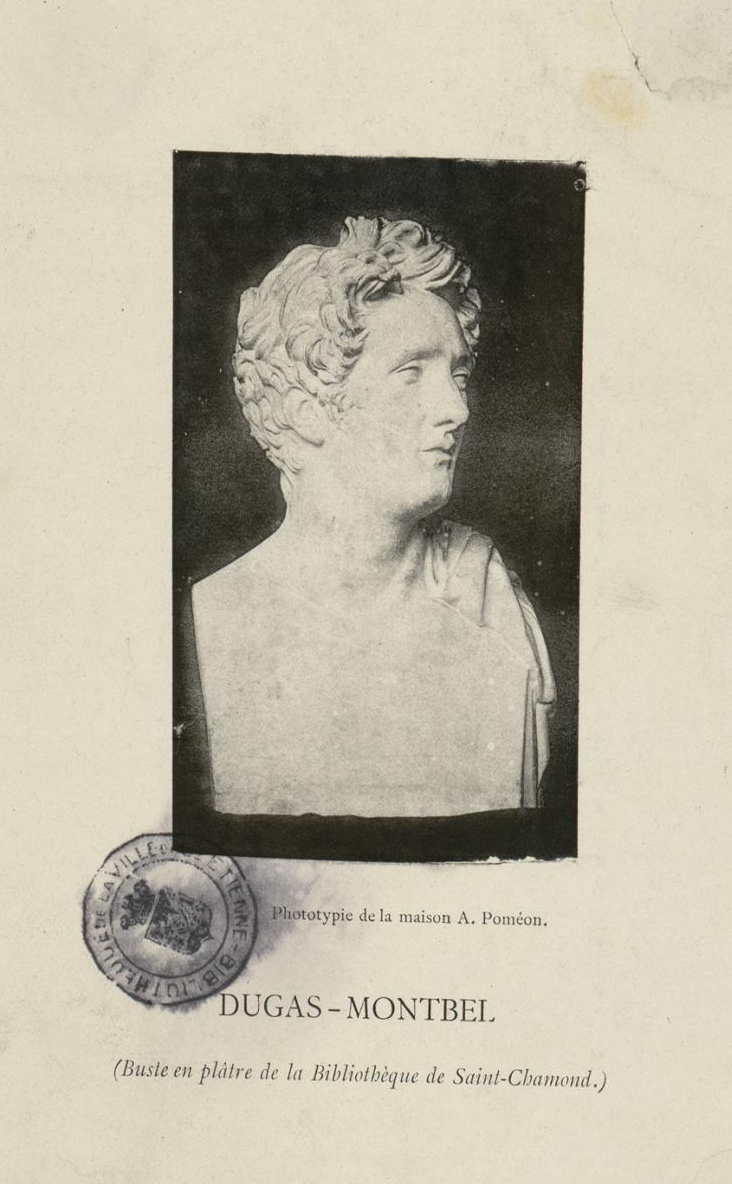
Jean-Baptiste Dugas-Montbel

Jean-Baptiste Dugas-Montbel (11 March 1776, Saint-Chamond, Loire – 30 November 1834) was a French translator and Hellenist.

== Early life and education ==
Jean-Baptiste Dugas-Montbel was born in Saint-Chamond, Loire, in the Auvergne-Rhône-Alpes region of France to Camille Dugas, a ribbon merchant and manufacturer, and his wife, Antoinette Victoire Crozet. His mother died in 1784, when Dugas-Montbel was eight years old. Dugas-Montbel was educated in a school run by the Oratorians in Lyon, but performed poorly. He briefly served in a volunteer battalion during the French Revolution, aged sixteen, but quickly returned to working for his father's business.

== Life and career ==
Camille Dugas died in 1799, and Dugas-Montbel took over his father's business alongside his older brother, Thomas. Dugas-Montbel's work often took him to Paris, and having developed an interest in literature, began to study the it further, alongside other subjects, notably ancient languages. He also associated with other contemporary intellectuals such as Jean-Baptiste Dumas and André-Marie Ampère.

Dugas-Montbel became a member of the Academy of Lyon in 1803, and left his family's business to pursue his interest in ancient Greek language and literature in 1810. In 1815, Dugas-Montbel published a translation of Homer's Iliad into French, and published translations of Homer's Odyssey, Batrachomyomachia, and the Homeric Hymns in 1818. These translations were well-received during Dugas-Montbel's time, and he became known as a prolific author of articles and essays on ancient Greek literature in France.

Dugas-Montbel became a member of the Académie des Inscriptions et Belles-Lettres and the Institut de France in 1830. He was elected to a local government position in his native region of Rhône on July 3 the same year. He was re-elected twice, on July 5, 1831, and June 23, 1834. He received the Legion of Honour in 1833.

Dugas-Montbel died in Paris in on November 30, 1834. He was unmarried and had no children. In his will, he gifted his personal library to the town of Saint-Chamond, along with 8,000 francs for upkeep of the collection and 10,000 additional francs for a savings fund for the town. This collection was partially destroyed by a fire in 1841. He is buried in Père Lachaise Cemetery, Paris.
