= May Dugas de Pallandt van Eerde =

American blackmailer, extortionist (1869–1937)

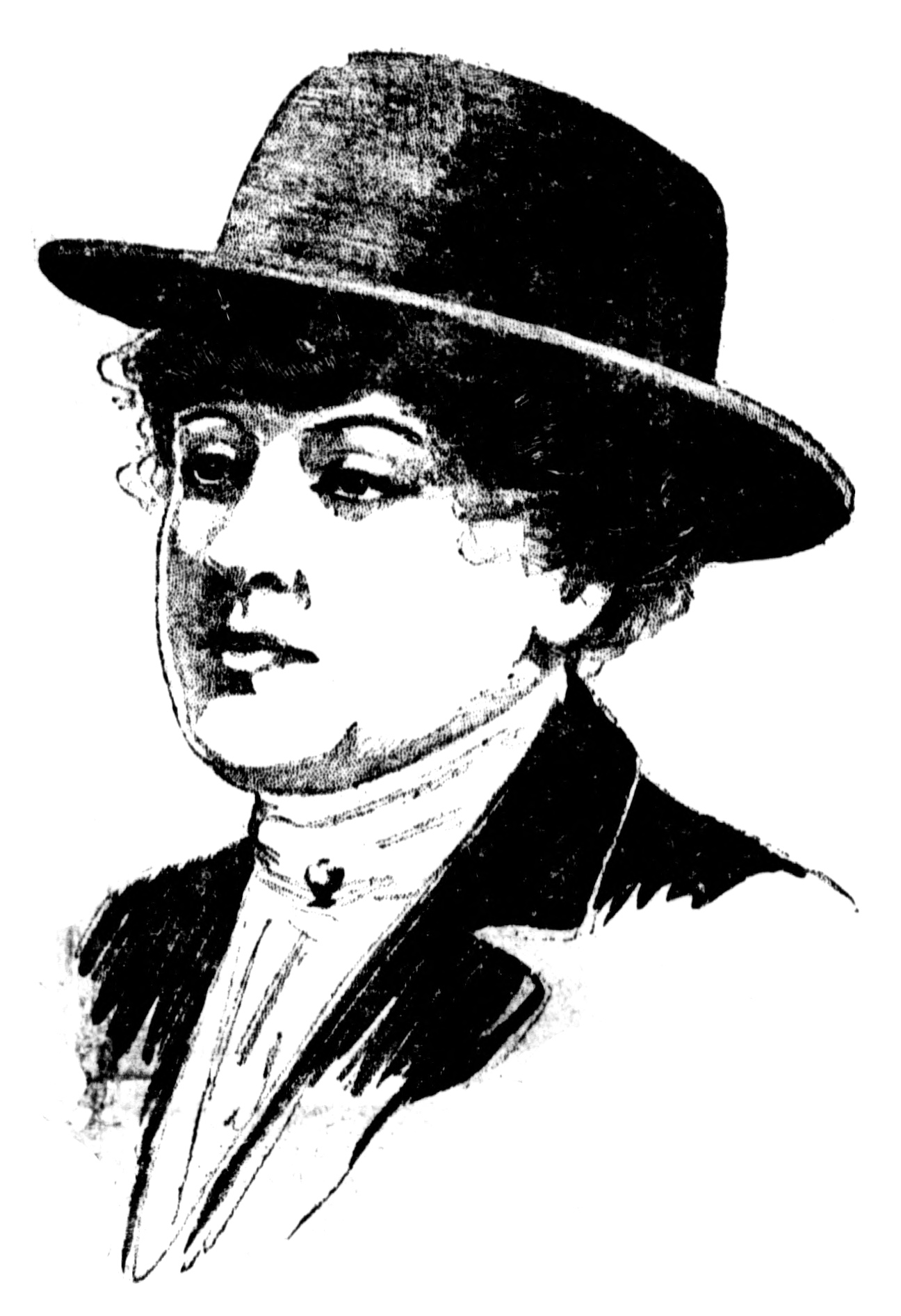
- Baroness de Pallandt, 1916
- Born: May Dugas; 23 May 1869; Chicago, Illinois, U.S.
- Died: 10 March 1937 (aged 67); New York City, U.S.
- Other names: Pauline Davidson; Pauline Townsend; Maude Jackson
- Occupations: Blackmailer; extortionist
- Spouse: Rudolph de Pallandt van Eerde

May Dugas de Pallandt van Eerde (23 May 1869 – 10 March 1937) is reputed to have earned an estimated $2 million from blackmail schemes and various business ventures during her life. She was sued by long-time friend Frank Gray Shaver for extortion and pursued by Pinkerton detectives for numerous blackmail, defrauding, and extortion incidents.

The Pinkerton detective who hunted Dugas across three continents told the story of her blackmail and extortion cons to Lloyd Wendt, reporter for the Chicago Daily Tribune in the 1940s. Wendt published that report in a series of Tribune articles running from late 1946 to early 1947. Dugas herself did not leave any written record of her life.

== Early life ==
She was born May Dugas on May 23, 1869, in the Chicago area. Her French-Canadian immigrant parents, Eugene and Sophie, had two other children, older son Paul and younger son Eugene. At the time of Dugas's birth the family was living in the Chicago area but by 1880 had moved to Muskegon, Michigan. Dugas's father worked there as a saloonkeeper and died between 1883 and 1885. After his death the family moved to Menominee, Michigan, where Dugas graduated from high school. By all reports she was a precocious student.

In 1887, when Dugas was 18, she left Menominee for Chicago. There is no record of her early months in Chicago but within a year of her arrival she took up residence at the city's most infamous bordello, Carrie Watson's at 441 South Clark Street. She also enrolled in some university courses and studied psychology, French, and business law. She managed to attract the attentions of a young man from a wealthy family, and he proposed marriage. But the young man's father became suspicious and hired a Pinkerton detective to investigate her. Detective Edwards (this name appears to be an alias) set up a trap, inviting her to participate in a scheme to earn "millions in fake copper mine stocks." When she fell for the bait he upended the engagement. But she extracted $20,000 from the father in exchange for a promise to save his son's reputation by not divulging the engagement.

Dugas next traveled to New York and then to Portland, Oregon, where she took up residence at another well-known bordello at that time, Emma Wingard's. During her residence there she met the woman who became her companion and accomplice for a short time, Fanny Lisle. Dugas and Lisle left Portland and, around 1889, journeyed to San Francisco. Lisle found work at Lillie Winter's bordello in North Beach. Meantime, Dugas entered into a romantic liaison with a Guatemalan coffee dealer, frequenting the Palm Court, Poodle Dog, and Cliff House with him. He put her up in an apartment on Powell Street, and she and Lisle formulated a plan to rob him of his money. However, their plan went awry and they were arrested in 1890 and held in the San Francisco jail on charges of larceny. They managed to break out of jail and flee the country. In 1892, San Francisco Municipal Reports identified them as fugitives from justice.

Dugas and Lisle journeyed to Shanghai, where they parted ways. Dugas met a British mining executive there and accompanied him to Hong Kong, where she blackmailed him for $25,000.

Dugas later traveled to Tokyo and took up residence at the Imperial Hotel. There she met a young John Kilpatrick. They embarked on an affair, and Kilpatrick delayed his return home to New York. His family became concerned about his ever-lengthening travels and dwindling funds and hired a Pinkerton detective to travel to Tokyo to determine what was delaying him. Upon discovering that May Dugas was the source of Kilpatrick's delay, Detective Edwards used what leverage he could, primarily his knowledge of Dugas's life as a prostitute, to persuade her to release Kilpatrick from her clutches. Dugas did leave Kilpatrick, who returned to New York, only to commit suicide a few months later. One of the coroners on the case suggested that it was a matter of homicide, not suicide, and another source asserted that heartbreak over Dugas was the reason for his suicide.

Dugas herself left Tokyo after breaking with Kilpatrick, first traveling to New York. There she advertised for and hired the woman who was to become her long-time companion and accomplice, Belle (Daisy) Andrews. Around 1890 they left New York for London.

== Baroness van Eerde ==
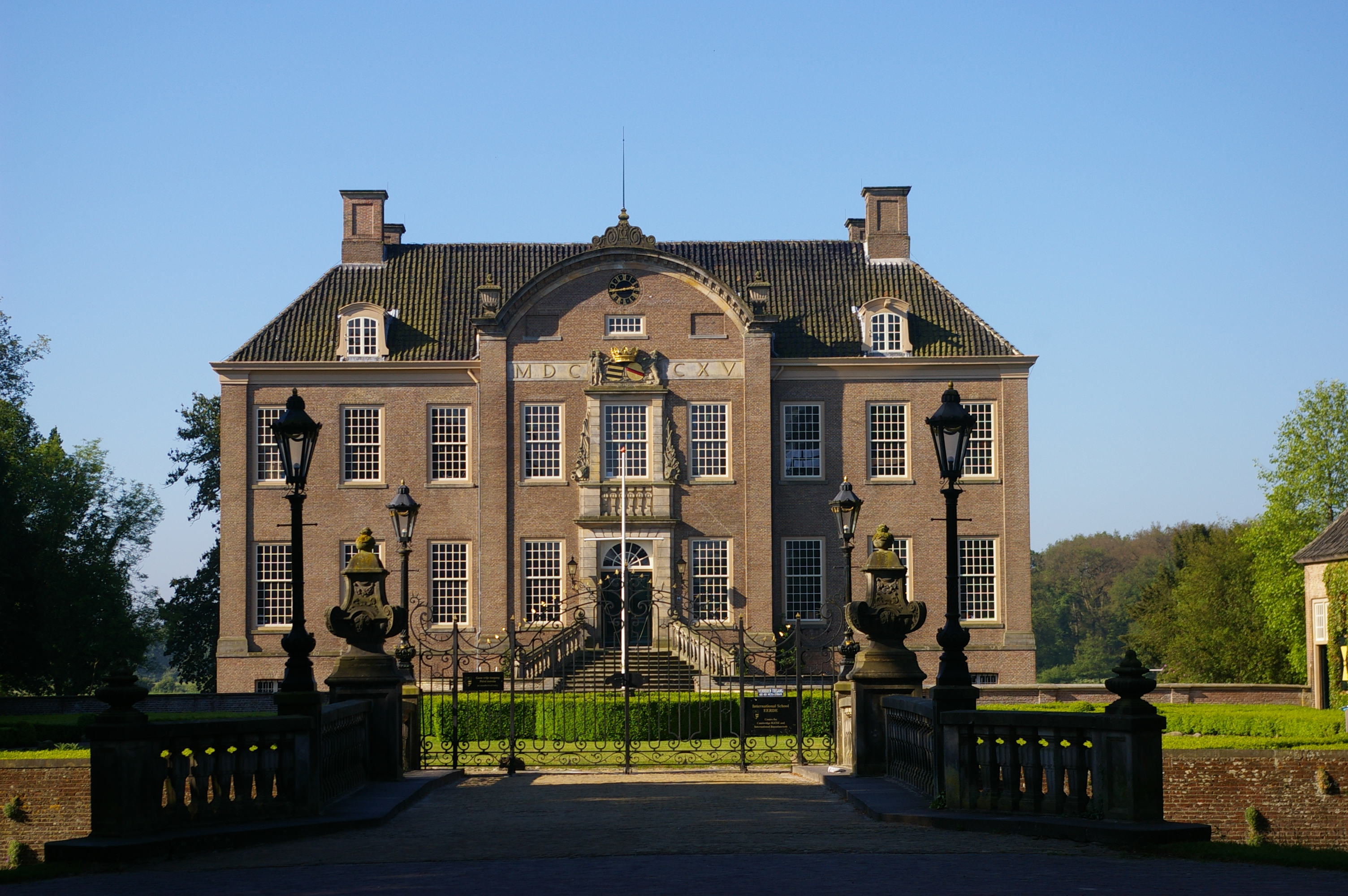
Castle Eerde c. 2011

It was in London that Dugas met Rudolph de Pallandt van Eerde. He pursued her and they were married November 20, 1892, at his estate in the Netherlands. Dugas, at age 23, became a baroness. She and her husband split their time between his Dutch country estate, Castle Eerde, and London. While in London the Baroness enjoyed life in the circles of high society and royalty. Her husband was master of hounds for the Princess of Wales and brother-in-law of Baroness Greenings van McEllen, lady-in-waiting to the Dowager Queen of the Netherlands. Sometime around 1900 the Baroness and her assistant, Daisy, left London for the United States.

In 1899, the Baron became disenchanted with the Baroness's long absences and began to press her for a divorce. She was reluctant to grant a divorce even though they never again resided together. In November 1899, the Baron and Baroness signed a deed of separation in Antwerp, which defined the financial terms of their legal separation. The Baron agreed to pay her £6000 when the deed was signed. According to one report Dugas inherited a small fortune at the time of the Baron's death. She maintained her title as Baroness until her death.

=== Life in the U.S. and liaison with Frank Shaver ===
The Baroness met Miss Frank Gray Shaver, an attorney living in the Chicago area, in 1901 and they became friends and traveling companions.

Around 1901, acting on a tip about a racetrack soon to be built outside Hot Springs, Arkansas, the Baroness traveled there and bought the Potash Sulphur Springs Hotel. She spent a good amount of time and money renovating the hotel and sold it for a tidy profit prior to the opening of the racetrack in 1903. Shaver acted as her legal advisor on matters related to this real estate deal.

Around 1902, Shaver became engaged to Dugas's younger brother, Gene, but Shaver grew increasingly uncomfortable with his habit of borrowing money from her and broke off the engagement around 1903. This led to a falling out between the Baroness and Frank Shaver, who suspended their friendship until 1912.

=== Life in London with Ernest Appleby ===
The Baroness met Ernest Appleby on a train in 1903, four years after she and the Baron separated. He made an offer of marriage that she declined, although the two began to live together as husband and wife and she represented herself as Mrs. Appleby. In 1906, they took up residence on the outskirts of London, at Bray Lodge in Maidenhead on the Thames. Appleby enjoyed gambling, and he and the Baroness took several took trips together to Monte Carlo, where he was so successful that one year he won $50,000 at the gambling tables there. On one of these Monte Carlo trips he purchased an expensive pearl necklace for the Baroness, which later became the subject of dispute. Appleby claimed he had only loaned her the money for this, but she said he had gifted the piece to her. Appleby sued her in 1914 for $20,000. The Baroness collapsed during the trial after being confronted about her arrest in San Francisco in 1890. The trial was adjourned due to her "sudden illness" and settled out of court in April 1914. The settlement terms were not disclosed.

In 1912, the Baroness sued Lloyd's Insurance Company and Gresham Insurance Company for payment on a black pearl and diamond brooch which she claimed was lost at the Shakespeare Ball in London. Lloyd's threatened to put her on the stand "to make a full statement of her life." The suit was settled out of court in February 1912, and terms were not disclosed.

== Menominee trial ==
In 1912, when Miss Shaver's father died, the Baroness sought her out and reestablished the friendship. The Baroness asked Shaver to accompany her to Menominee and invest a half-interest in the family's Menominee home, which Shaver agreed to do. Shaver took up residence in the Menominee home and oversaw some improvements in the home. However, she quickly ran through the inheritance from her father and asked that the Baroness repay all the money she had loaned her over the years, funds totaling some $100,000. But the Baroness claimed that she did not owe Miss Shaver any money and that Miss Shaver had signed a release absolving her of any indebtedness. Shaver, seeing no other recourse, sued the Baroness for extortion. The trial took place in Menominee in 1917 and was settled out of court, with the Baroness being required to repay $13,515.

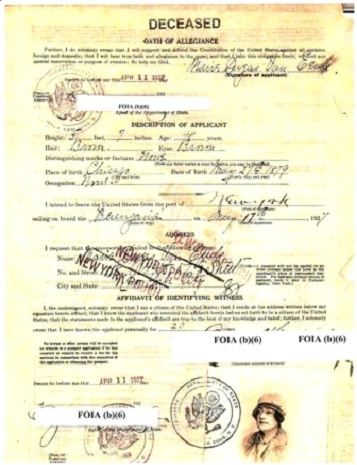
Passport Application 1927

== Adoption ==
Little is known of the Baroness's life after the conclusion of the 1917 Menominee trial. She adopted an infant boy in 1917 (she was 47 or 48 at the time) and named him John Andrew van Eerde. National Archives ship records show the Baroness and her son traveling in the summer months to Europe during his childhood and adolescent years. John van Eerde attended Harvard and became a Professor of Romance Languages at Lehigh University. He served with distinction during World War II (as in interpreter of Italian prisoner mail for Allied Intelligence), married, had one child, and died in 2006.

== Death ==
The Baroness died in New York City on March 10, 1937. Her death certificate identified her as May de Pallandt van Eerde and the cause of death was noted as cancer. The newspaper death notice listed her as beloved wife Marie of Edward Allen Morrisey, who worked for the Zanuck Movie Company.
