= Jean-Baptiste-Trefflé Richard =

Canadian politician

Jean-Baptiste-Trefflé Richard (November 23, 1856 – March 30, 1927) was a farmer, notary and political figure in Quebec. He represented Montcalm in the Legislative Assembly of Quebec from 1881 to 1886 as a Conservative.

He was born in Saint-Liguori, Canada East, the son of Simon Richard and Éléonore Forest, and was educated there and at the Collège de l'Assomption. Richard established himself on a farm at Saint-Liguori. He was elected to the Quebec assembly in 1881 and again in 1886, but resigned his seat in 1886 after being named a crown lands agent. Richard served as clerk for the Executive Council in 1887. Around 1891, he became customs inspector for Joliette County. In 1891, he married Marie-Paméla Hénault. Richard articled as a notary, was qualified to practise in 1898 and set up practice at Saint-Liguori and later L'Épiphanie. He was an unsuccessful candidate for a seat in the House of Commons in 1917. He served as secretary-treasurer for L'Épiphanie from 1907 to 1913 and in 1921. He died in Montreal at the age of 70.
