= François Octave Dugas =

Canadian politician

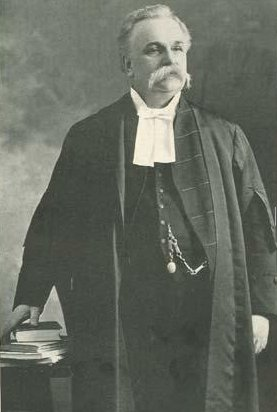

Member of the Canadian Parliament for Montcalm
- In office 1900–1909
- Preceded by: Joseph Louis Euclide Dugas
- Succeeded by: David Arthur Lafortune

Personal details
- Born: April 12, 1852 St-Jacques de l'Achigan, Montcalm County, Canada East
- Died: June 22, 1918 (aged 66)
- Party: Liberal

François Octave Dugas, KC (April 12, 1852 – June 22, 1918) was a Canadian politician.

Born in St-Jacques de l'Achigan, Montcalm County, Canada East, the son of Aimé Dugas and Sophie Poirier, Dugas was educated at St. Mary's College in Montreal and McGill University. He was admitted to the Quebec bar in 1880 and set up practice as a lawyer in Joliette. Dugas was Crown Prosecutor for the District of Joliette from 1887 to 1892 and again from 1897 to 1909. He also served as solicitor for the town of Joliette from 1890 to 1900. Dugas was created a King's Counsel in 1899. He was first elected to the House of Commons of Canada for the electoral district of Montcalm in the general elections of 1900. A Liberal, He was re-elected in 1904 and 1908.

In 1909, he was named judge in the Quebec Superior Court for Joliette district. He died at Joliette at the age of 66.

His son Lucien served as a member of the Quebec assembly.

== Electoral record ==
1908 Canadian federal election: Montcalm
Party	Candidate	Votes	%	±%
Liberal	François Octave Dugas	1,432	53.3	+0.1
Conservative	Joseph-Adolphe Renaud	1,256	46.7	-0.1
Total valid votes		2,688	100.0	

1904 Canadian federal election: Montcalm
Party	Candidate	Votes	%	±%
Liberal	François Octave Dugas	1,227	53.2	-1.0
Conservative	J.E.E. Marion	1,079	46.8	+1.0
Total valid votes		2,306	100.0	

1900 Canadian federal election: Montcalm
Party	Candidate	Votes	%	±%
Liberal	François Octave Dugas	1,212	54.2	+11.2
Conservative	Louis Euclide Dugas	1,024	45.8	-11.2
Total valid votes		2,236	100.0	
