= Firmin Dugas =

Canadian politician

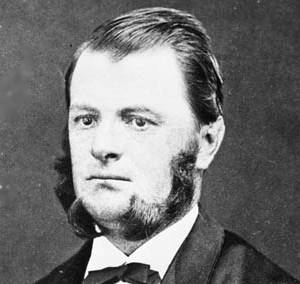
- Source: Library and Archives Canada

Member of the Canadian Parliament for Montcalm
- In office 1871–1887
- Preceded by: Joseph Dufresne
- Succeeded by: Olaüs Thérien

Member of the Legislative Assembly of Quebec for Montcalm
- In office 1867–1874
- Succeeded by: Louis-Gustave Martin

Personal details
- Born: March 8, 1830 Rawdon, Lower Canada
- Died: March 16, 1889 (aged 59)
- Party: Conservative

Firmin Dugas (March 8, 1830 – March 16, 1889) was a Quebec businessman and political figure. He was a Conservative member of the House of Commons of Canada representing Montcalm from 1871 to 1887 and in the Legislative Assembly of Quebec from 1867 to 1874.

He was born in Rawdon Township, Lower Canada in 1830 and studied at Collège de l'Assomption. Dugas owned and operated several sawmills and flour mills at Saint-Liguori. He was mayor of Saint-Liguori from 1860 to 1862. He was elected to the Quebec assembly in 1867; he was elected to the House of Commons in an 1871 by-election after Joseph Dufresne resigned his seat to accept a post as sheriff. Dugas resigned his seat in the Quebec assembly in 1874 when it became illegal to hold seats in both houses.

He died at Saint-Liguori in 1889.

His son Joseph-Louis-Euclide also later represented Montcalm in the House of Commons.

1887 Canadian federal election: Montcalm
Party	Candidate	Votes	%	±%
Conservative	Olaüs Thérien	953	53.3	+2.8
Nationalist	Firmin Dugas	835	46.7	
Total valid votes		1,788	100.0	

1882 Canadian federal election: Montcalm
Party	Candidate	Votes	%	±%
Conservative	Firmin Dugas	828	50.5	+0.6
Unknown	Octave Magnan	812	49.5	
Total valid votes		1,640	100.0	

1878 Canadian federal election: Montcalm
Party	Candidate	Votes	%
Conservative	Firmin Dugas	698	49.9
Unknown	N. Forest	374	26.8
Unknown	I.B. Deslongchamp	240	17.2
Unknown	V.J.E. Brouillet	86	6.2
Total valid votes		1,398	100.0

1874 Canadian federal election: Montcalm
Party	Candidate	Votes
Conservative	Firmin Dugas	acclaimed
Source: lop.parl.ca

1872 Canadian federal election: Montcalm
Party	Candidate	Votes
Conservative	Firmin Dugas	acclaimed
Source: Canadian Elections Database

By-election on 15 September 1871 On Mr. Dufresne's resignation, to become Sheriff of the County of St. John, 13 July 1871
Party	Candidate	Votes
Conservative	Firmin Dugas	acclaimed
