= Saint-Cuthbert, Quebec =

Saint-Cuthbert
- Municipality
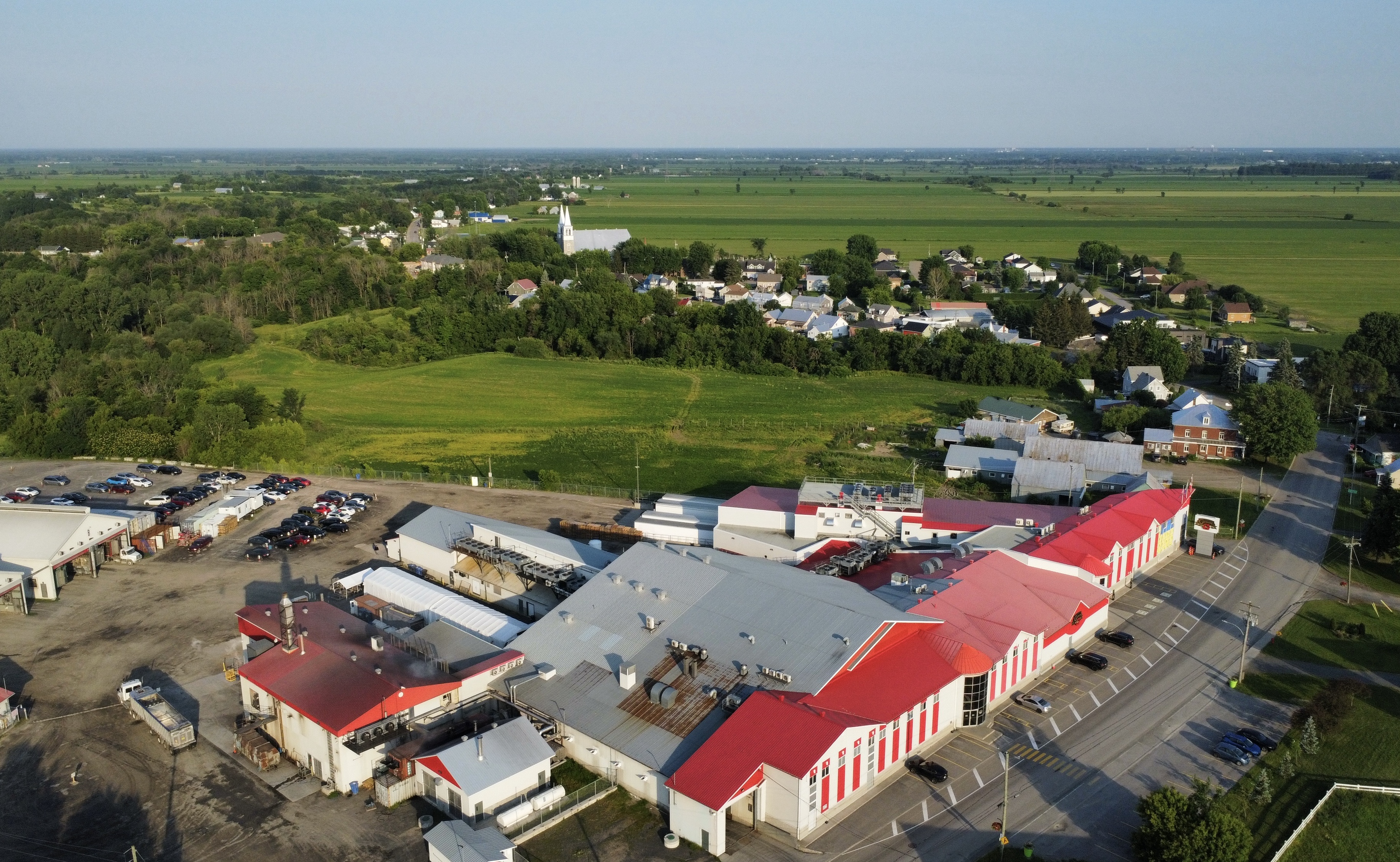

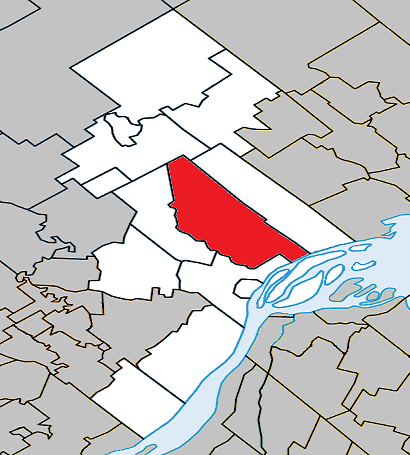
- Location within D'Autray RCM

- Location in central Quebec
- Coordinates: 46°09′N 73°14′W
- Country: Canada
- Province: Quebec
- Region: Lanaudière
- RCM: D'Autray
- Settled: 1740
- Constituted: January 7, 1998

Government
  - Mayor: Richard Belhumeur
  - Federal riding: Berthier—Maskinongé
  - Prov. riding: Berthier

Area
  - Total: 131.47 km^{2} (50.76 sq mi)
  - Land: 131.72 km^{2} (50.86 sq mi)
- There is an apparent contradiction between two authoritative sources.

Population (2021)
  - Total: 1,821
  - Density: 13.8/km^{2} (36/sq mi)
  - Pop (2016-21): ▼2.2%
  - Dwellings: 917
- Time zone: UTC−5 (EST)
  - Summer (DST): UTC−4 (EDT)
- Postal code(s): J0K 2C0
- Area codes: 450 and 579
- Highways A-40: R-138
- Website: st-cuthbert.qc.ca

Saint-Cuthbert is a municipality in Quebec, Canada, located between Montreal and Trois-Rivieres, just north of Berthierville. It is part of the D'Autray Regional County Municipality in the Lanaudière administrative region. The population as of the 2021 Canadian census was 1,821.

== History ==
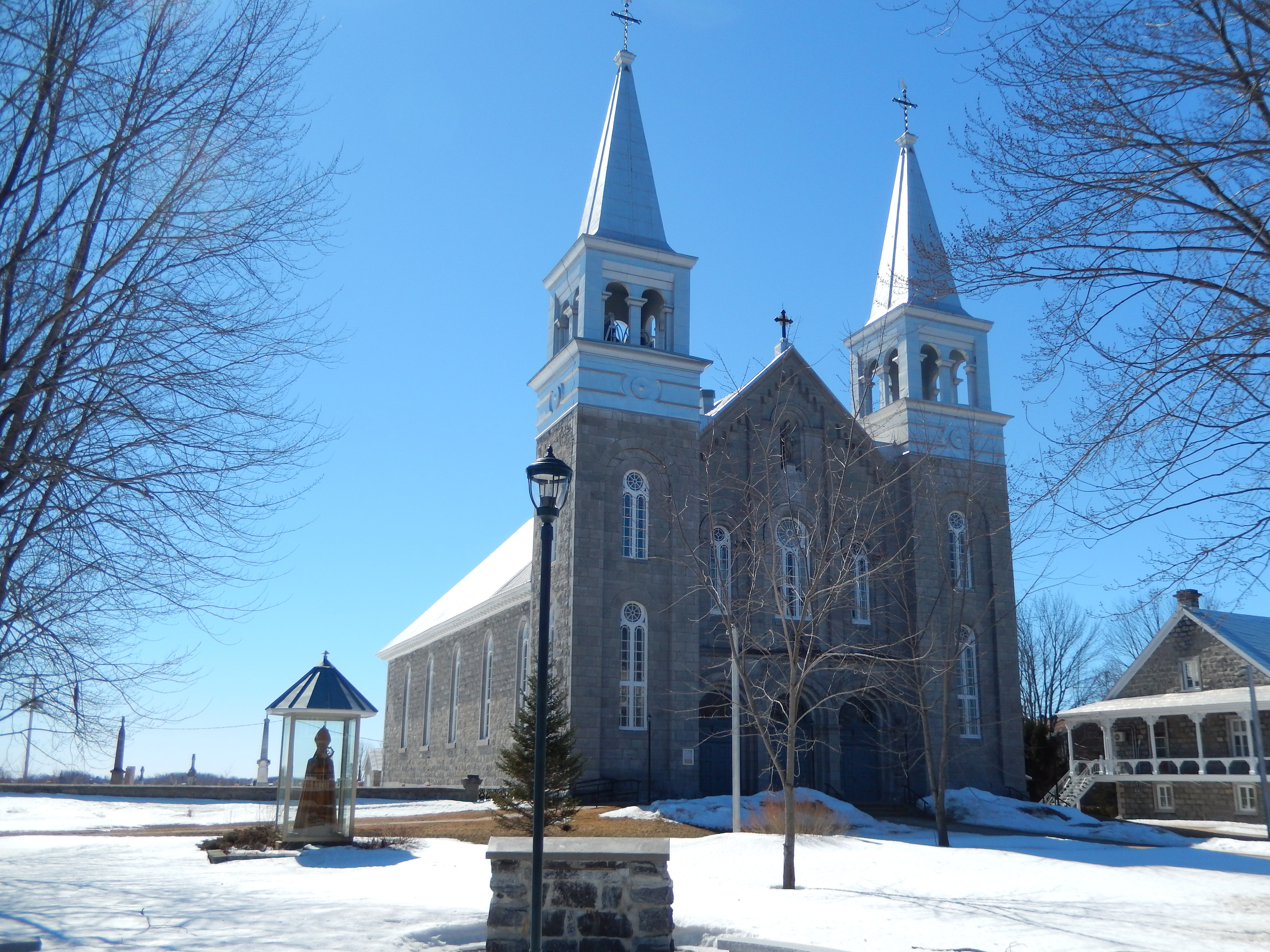
Church, St. Cuthbert, 2015

The area had its first settlers as early as 1740. In 1766, James Cuthbert (ca. 1719-1798), member of General Murray's staff and lord of the Berthier seignory, donated land to build a church, provided that its patron saint was Saint Cuthbert.

In 1845, the Municipality of Saint Cuthbert was originally established, but abolished in 1847. It was reestablished as a parish municipality in 1855. In 1851, its post office opened. In 1912, Saint-Cuthbert ceded part of its territory to create the Parish Municipality of Saint-Viateur.

On January 7, 1998, the Parish Municipality of Saint-Cuthbert and the Parish Municipality of Saint-Viateur merged to form the Municipality of Saint-Cuthbert.

== Demographics ==
In the 2021 Census of Population conducted by Statistics Canada, Saint-Cuthbert had a population of 1,821, living in 843 private dwellings out of its 917 total dwellings. With a land area of 131.72 square kilometres (50.86 sq mi) Saint-Cuthbert had a population density of 13.8 per square kilometre (36/sq mi).

Historical Census Data - Saint Cuthbert, Quebec

Year	Pop.	±%
1921	2,185	—
1931	1,794	−17.9%
1941	1,792	−0.1%
1951	1,779	−0.7%
1956	1,740	−2.2%
1961	1,654	−4.9%

Year	Pop.	±%
1966	1,726	+4.4%
1971	1,643	−4.8%
1976	1,532	−6.8%
1981	1,730	+12.9%
1986	1,687	−2.5%
1991	1,645	−2.5%

Year	Pop.	±%
1996	1,722	+4.7%
2001	1,899	+10.3%
2006	1,938	+2.1%
2011	1,839	−5.1%
2016	1,862	+1.3%
2021	1,821	−2.2%

Population counts are not adjusted for boundary changes and mergers.
Source: Statistics Canada

Historical census populations – Saint-Viateur

Year	Pop.	±%
1921	251	—
1931	277	+10.4%
1941	284	+2.5%
1951	271	−4.6%
1956	291	+7.4%
1961	335	+15.1%
1966	272	−18.8%

Year	Pop.	±%
1971	288	+5.9%
1976	248	−13.9%
1981	184	−25.8%
1986	235	+27.7%
1991	230	−2.1%
1996	201	−12.6%

The Parish Municipality of Saint-Viateur existed from 1912 to 1998, when it was merged with Saint-Cuthbert.
Source: Statistics Canada

Mother tongue (2021):

Language	Population	Pct (%)
French	1770	97.3
English	15	0.8%
English and French	10	0.5%
Other	15	0.8%

== Education ==
The Commission scolaire des Samares is a francophone school district headquartered in Saint-Félix-de-Valois. It serves the Lanaudière region and oversees several primary schools and high schools including:

- École Sainte-Anne

The Sir Wilfrid Laurier School Board, headquartered in Rosemere, it serves 14,000 students across 26 elementary schools and operates anglophone public schools, including:

- Joliette Elementary School in Saint-Charles-Borromée
- Joliette High School in Joliette

== Notable people ==
- François-Marie-Thomas Chevalier de Lorimier

== See also ==
- List of municipalities in Quebec
- James Cuthbert Jr. - son of James Cuthbert, founder of Saint-Cuthbert
