= Saint-Jacques, Quebec =

Saint-Jacques
- Municipality
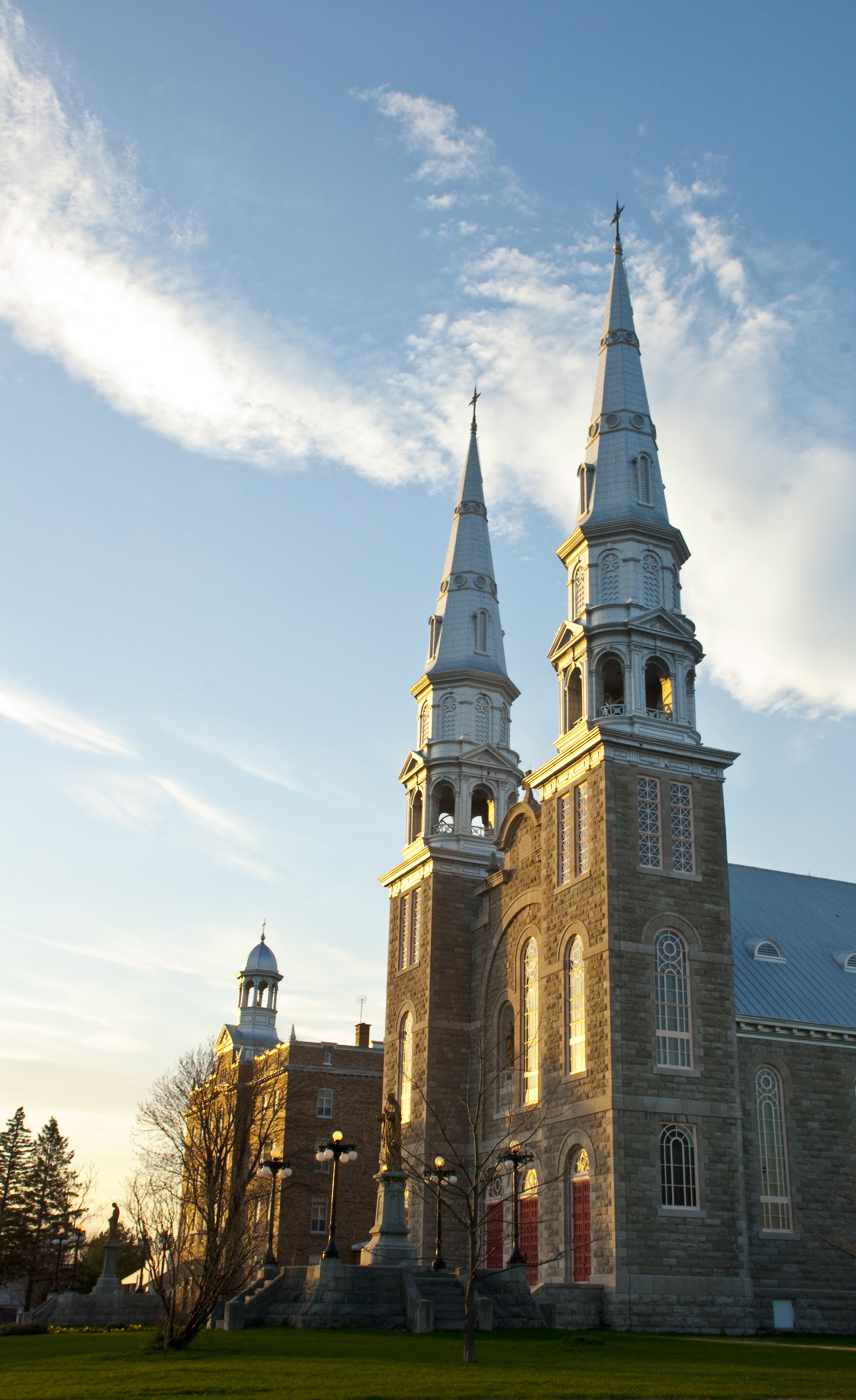
- The Church of Saint-Jacques, ca. 1915–1918, replaced an early nineteenth-century church destroyed by fire in 1914.

- Coat of arms

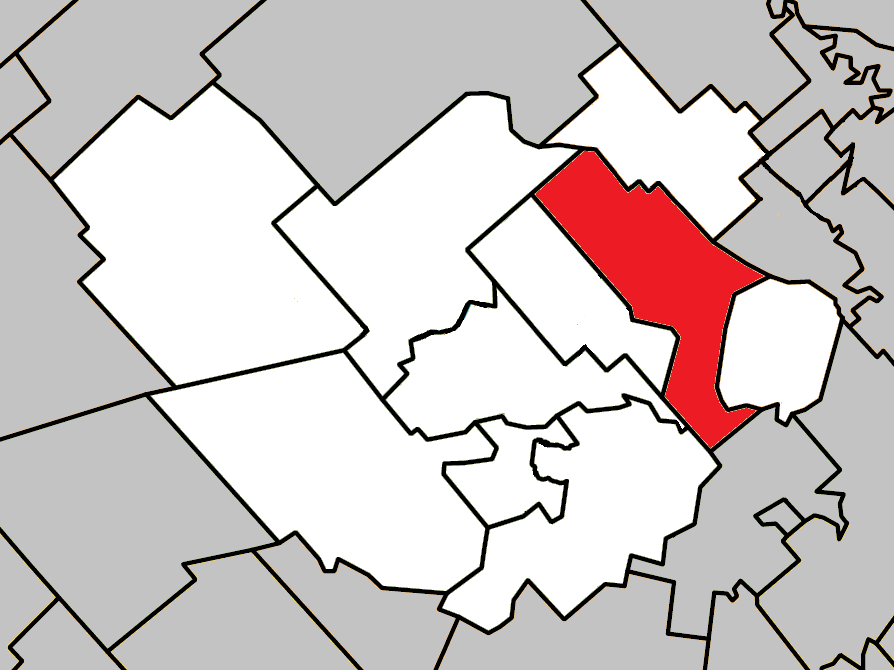
- Location within Montcalm RCM

- Location in central Quebec
- Coordinates: 45°57′N 73°34′W
- Country: Canada
- Province: Quebec
- Region: Lanaudière
- RCM: Montcalm
- Settled: Mid 18th-century
- Constituted: May 20, 1998
- Named for: Jacques Degeay

Government
  - Mayor: Josyanne Forest
  - Federal riding: Montcalm
  - Prov. riding: Rousseau

Area
  - Municipality: 67.20 km^{2} (25.95 sq mi)
  - Land: 67.17 km^{2} (25.93 sq mi)
  - Urban: 3.31 km^{2} (1.28 sq mi)

Population (2021)
  - Municipality: 4,302
  - Density: 64/km^{2} (170/sq mi)
  - Urban: 2,647
  - Urban density: 800/km^{2} (2,100/sq mi)
  - Pop (2016–21): ▲8.3%
  - Dwellings: 1,939
- Time zone: UTC−5 (EST)
  - Summer (DST): UTC−4 (EDT)
- Postal code(s): J0K 2R0
- Area codes: 450 and 579
- Highways: R-158 R-341
- Website: www.st-jacques.org

Saint-Jacques (French pronunciation: [sɛ̃ ʒak]) is a 26 mi² (67.34 km²) rural municipality in the Lanaudière region of Quebec, Canada, part of the Montcalm Regional County Municipality with a population of 4,300 year-round residents. Known for its natural beauty and horticulture, the municipality's northwest boundary is formed by the Ouareau River, and the Saint‑Georges stream flows southeast and marks the southern boundary. Officially founded in 1774 by thirty Acadian families who managed to escape by boat to Quebec after forced expulsion, Saint-Jacques is part of the region known as the "Acadian cradle of Lanaudière."

"The Great Upheaval" (Fr. "le Grand Dérangement") began in the fall of 1755 and lasted until 1778. "The first removals ... [of] approximately 7,000 people were from settlements around the Bay of Fundy" in present-day Nova Scotia. The majority were expelled by ship to the "continental colonies or France," but 225 fled south to Quebec. They would go on to found a handful of new Acadian villages, or “Little Cadies,” including Saint-Jacques, which is why the Saint-Jacques coat of arms uses the same colors as the Acadian flag.

The municipality was named Saint-Jacques in honour of Jacques Degeay (1717–1774), priest of L'Assomption from 1742 to 1774, who supported the Acadians in 1766.

== History ==
Originally called Saint-Jacques-de-la-Nouvelle-Acadie to commemorate the Acadians' second pioneering effort and Father Jacques Degeay who helped them, the municipality provided the settlers key resources for living off the land. The site provided ready access to "hardwood ... with which [to] build homes, barns, poultry houses, hog barns, sheep pens.... ploughs, tables, chairs, or tool handles ... and "soft wood" — the white pine especially — [for] cabinets, hutches, bowls and shoes." Although the first houses, built in 1768, were wood, by the beginning of the 1800s, they were being built of stone, which was also plentiful. An oft-repeated adage explained such abundance this way: "Our fathers lost Acadia; In return, [we] found the richest lands of Lower Canada.... In [our] veins flow[s] the purest French blood."

Over the years, the territory has been known by various names:

- Saint-Jacques-de-la-Nouvelle-Acadie (ca. 1770)
- Saint-Jacques-de-l'Achigan (1832-1917)
- Saint-Jacques-de-Saint-Sulpice
- L'Achigan
- Nouvelle-Acadie
- Terres-Promises
- Saint-Jacques-de-Montcalm

In 1772, the parish of Saint-Jacques-de-l'Achigan was founded. That same year, the villagers hired a priest and, in 1775, they built their first church. Nine years later, they began cultivating tobacco, which became so essential it is pictured on one of the four quadrants of the municipality's coat of arms. Other agricultural crops followed: corn, grain, as well as dairy farms in the swine industry, vegetable farming, the farming of mink, and maple trees, eventually leading to the development of off-season industries and factories.

In 1835, its post office opened with the abbreviated name of Saint-Jacques. In 1845, the Parish Municipality of Saint-Jacques-de-Saint-Sulpice or L'Achigan was formed, but abolished in 1847 to become part of the County Municipality of L'Assomption. In 1855, the Parish Municipality of Saint-Jacques(-de-l'Achigan) was reestablished. By 1895, Lippincott's Gazetteer of the World: A Complete Pronouncing Gazetteer Or Geographical Dictionary of the World Containing Notices of Over One Hundred and Twenty-five Thousand Places described Saint-Jacques this way:

SAINT JACQUES DE L’ACHIGAN, a post-village of Québec, co. of Montcalm, 13 miles N.N.W. of L'Assomption. It has a church, a convent, a brewery, &c. Pop. 800.

In 1912, the Village Municipality of Saint-Jacques-de-l'Achigan was created when it ceded from the parish municipality. Its name was shortened to Saint-Jacques in 1917, and three years later, the name of the parish municipality was also abbreviated.

In 1998, the village municipality and the parish municipality merged to form the new Municipality of Saint-Jacques.

== Demographics ==
=== Population ===
Historical Census Populations Saint-Jacques, Quebec
Year	Pop.	±%
2001	3,692	—
2006	3,706	+0.4%
2011	4,021	+8.5%
2016	3,971	−1.2%
2021	4,302	+8.3%
Source: Statistics Canada

Private dwellings occupied by usual residents (2021): 1,892 (total dwellings: 1,939)

Language
Mother Tongue (2021)	Population	Pct (%)
French only	4,120	97.1%
English only	25	0.6%
Both English and French	40	0.9%
Other languages	55	1.3%

== Attractions ==
- Saint-Jacques is a destination for outdoor activities such as snowshoeing, cross-country skiing, and hiking.
- In addition to the Parc des Cultures, which uses arts, horticulture and ornament to memorialize the municipality's history, it also hosts the hiker-friendly Parc de la Coulée.
- The Maison de la Nouvelle-Acadie (Home of the New Acadia) is a small museum that traces the eight-part story of the Acadian arrival in Canada from 1604 to the foundation of Saint-Jacques in 1774.
- Several structures are listed on both the Répertoire du patrimoine culturel du Québec and the Canadian Register of Historic Places:
  - l'ancien bureau de poste
  - l’église de Saint-Jacques
  - la maison Louise-Pariseau
  - le parc des cultures
  - le parc Grand-Pré
  - la maison de la Nouvelle-Acadie
  - le couvent des sœurs de Sainte-Anne
  - le centre culturel du Vieux-Collège

== Education ==
French-language Schools		English-language Schools
Governance	Commission scolaire des Samares	The Sir Wilfrid Laurier School Board
Elementary	École de Grand-Pré	Joliette Elementary School in Saint-Charles-Borromée
High school	École Saint-Louis-de-France	Joliette High School in Joliette

== Notable people ==
- Francis Cassidy (1827–1873), lawyer and Mayor of Montreal for three months, dying in office
- Bernard Landry (1937–2018), Premier of Quebéc from 2001–2003

== Gallery ==
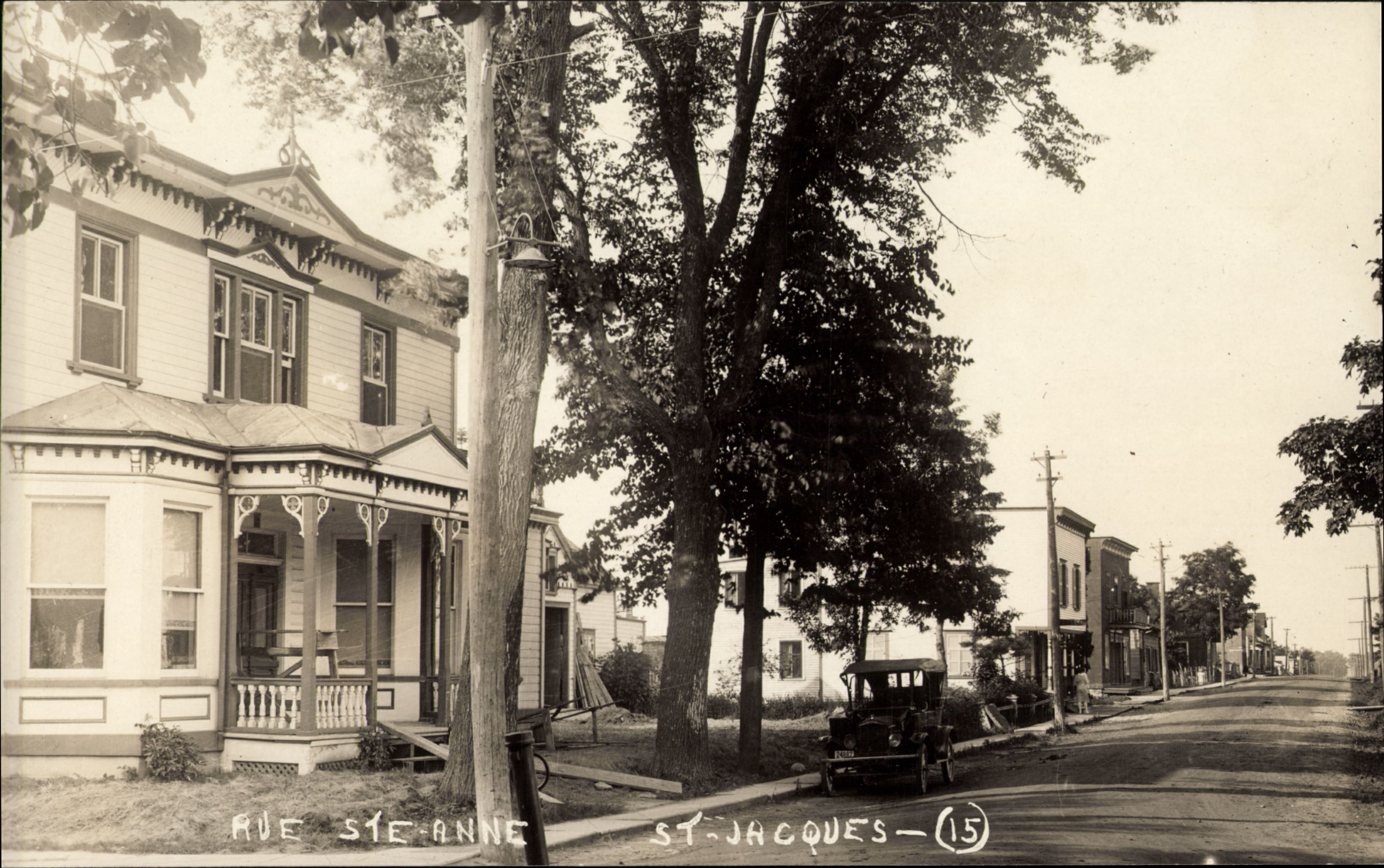
Constructed prior to the 18th century, Rue Ste-Anne is one of the municipality's oldest streets.

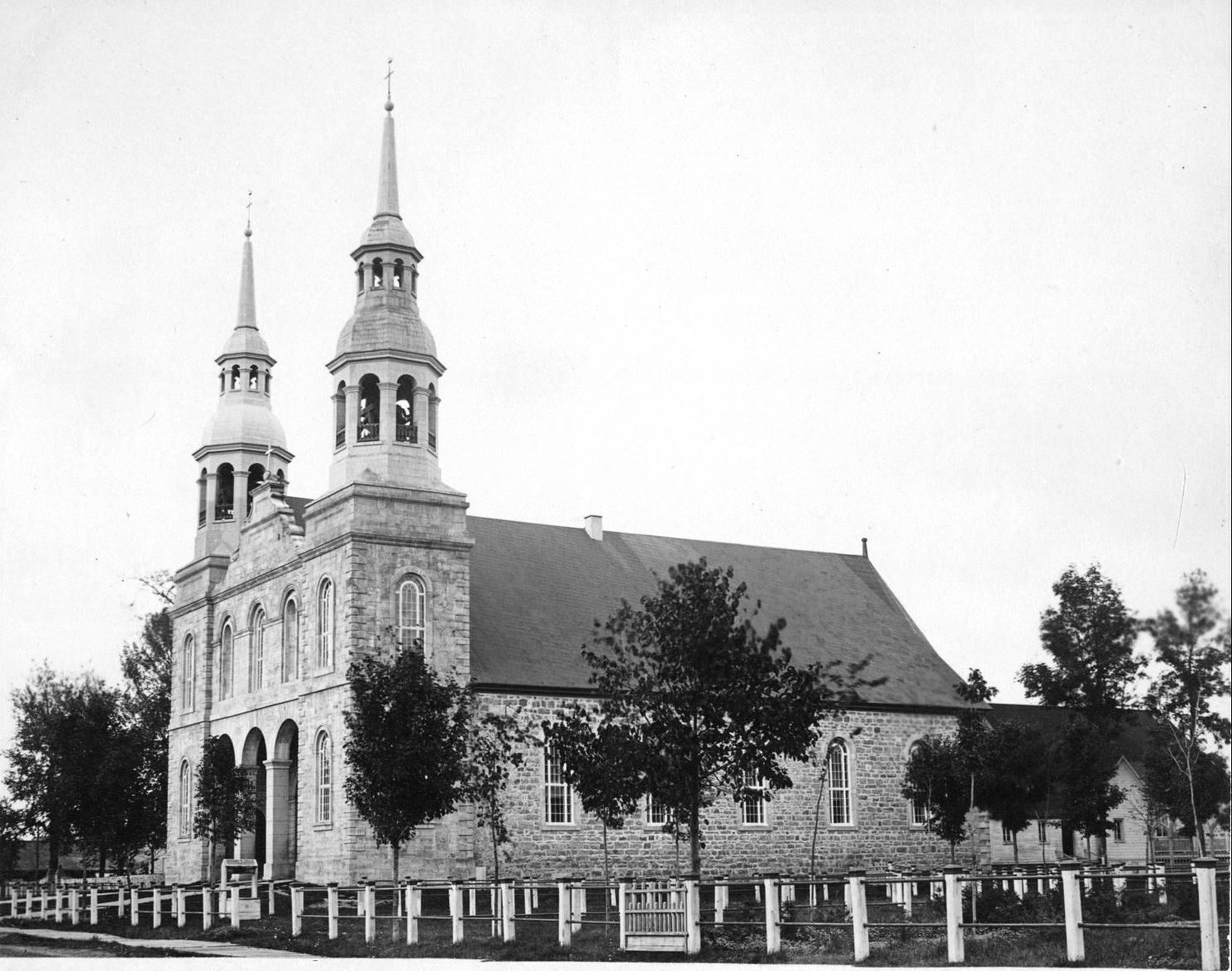
Saint-Jacques-le-Majeur de L'Achigan was destroyed by fire in 1914.

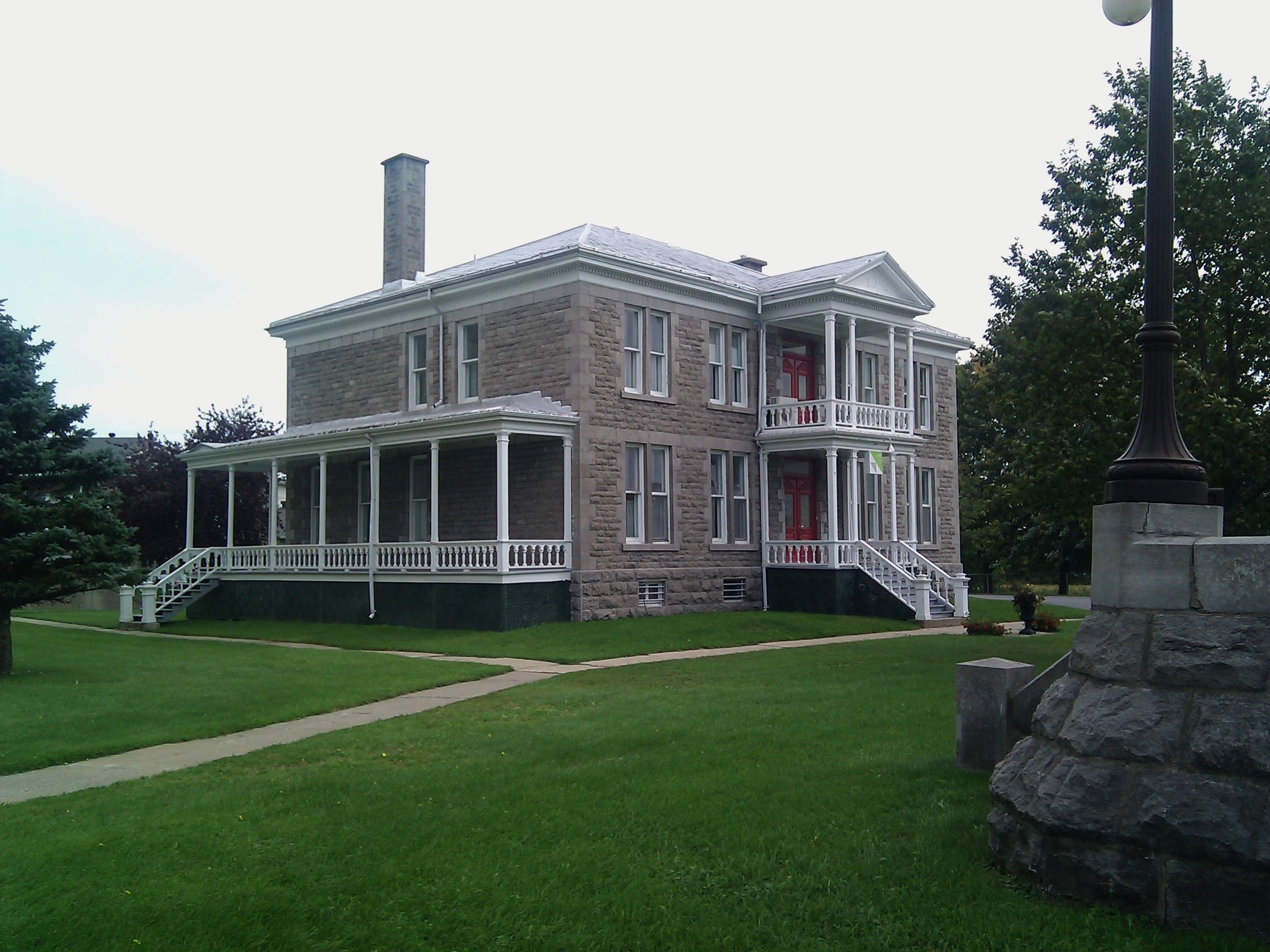
Built in 1897, the Saint-Jacques Presbytery is now on the Canadian Register of Historic Places.

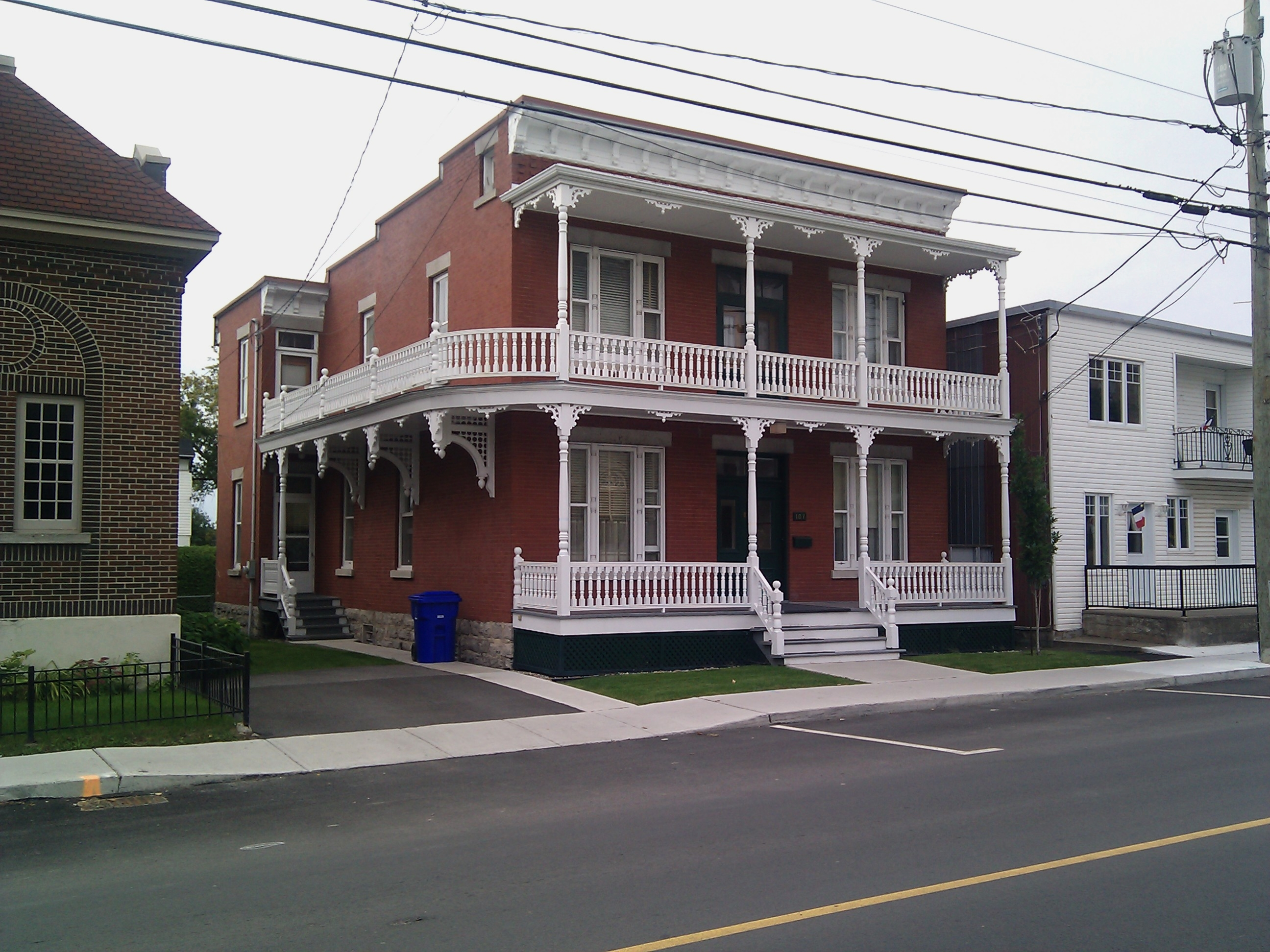
Built in 1905 as a residence, the Maison Louise-Pariseau is now on the Canadian Register of Historic Places.

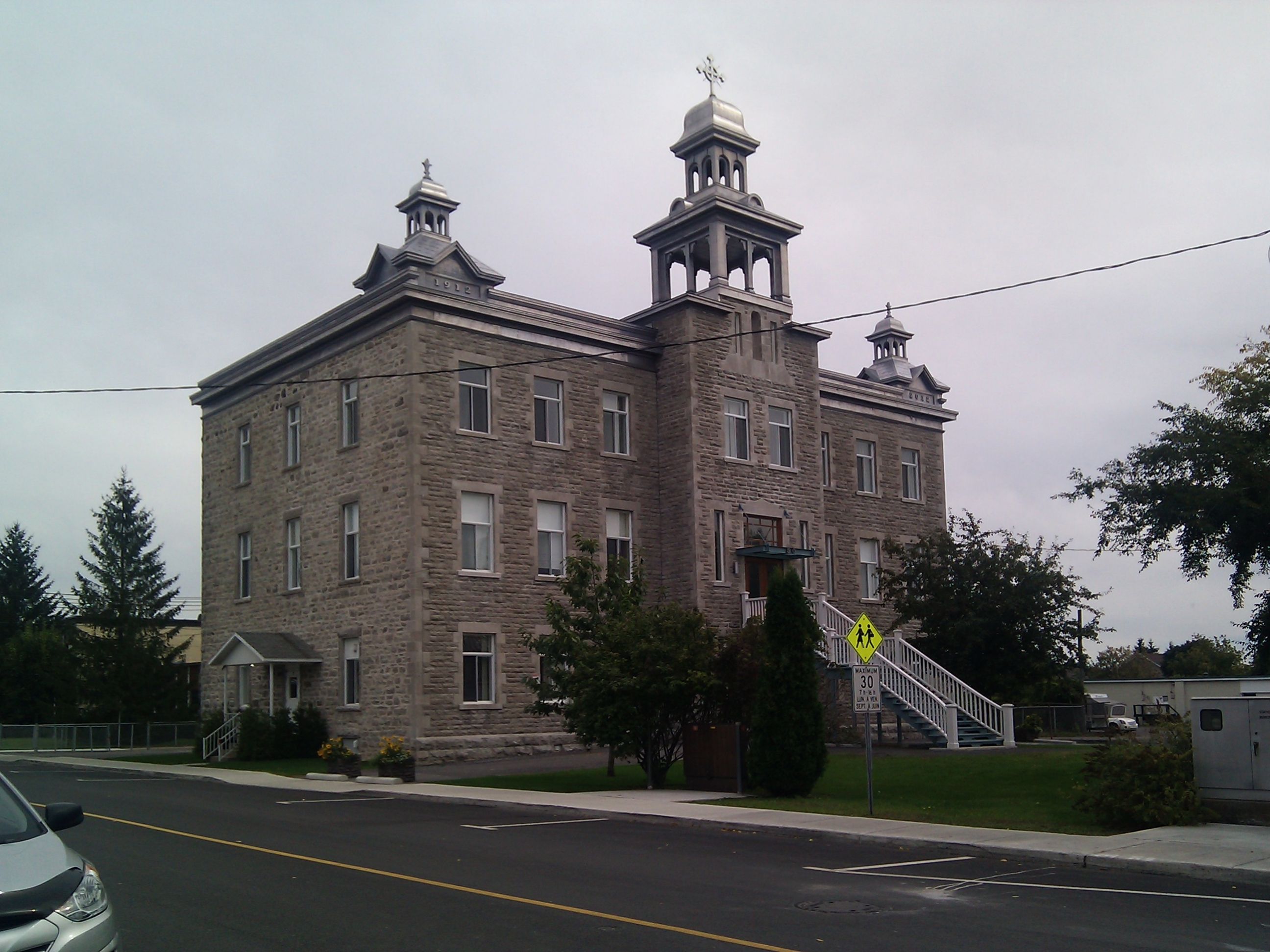
Built in 1912, Vieux Collège Saint-Jacques is on the Canadian Register of Historic Places.

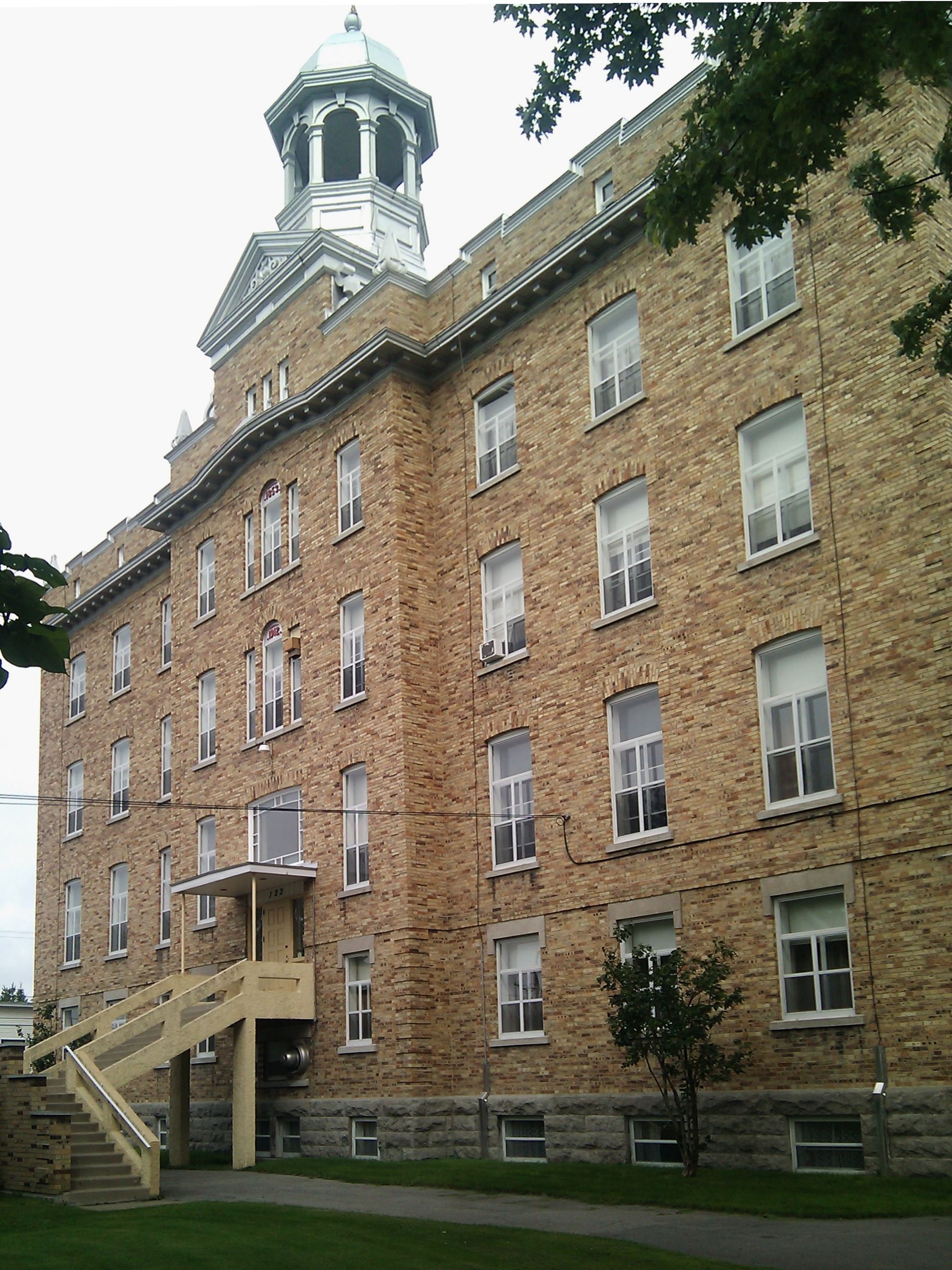
Built in 1913, the Couvent des Sœurs de Sainte-Anne is on the Canadian Register of Historic Places.

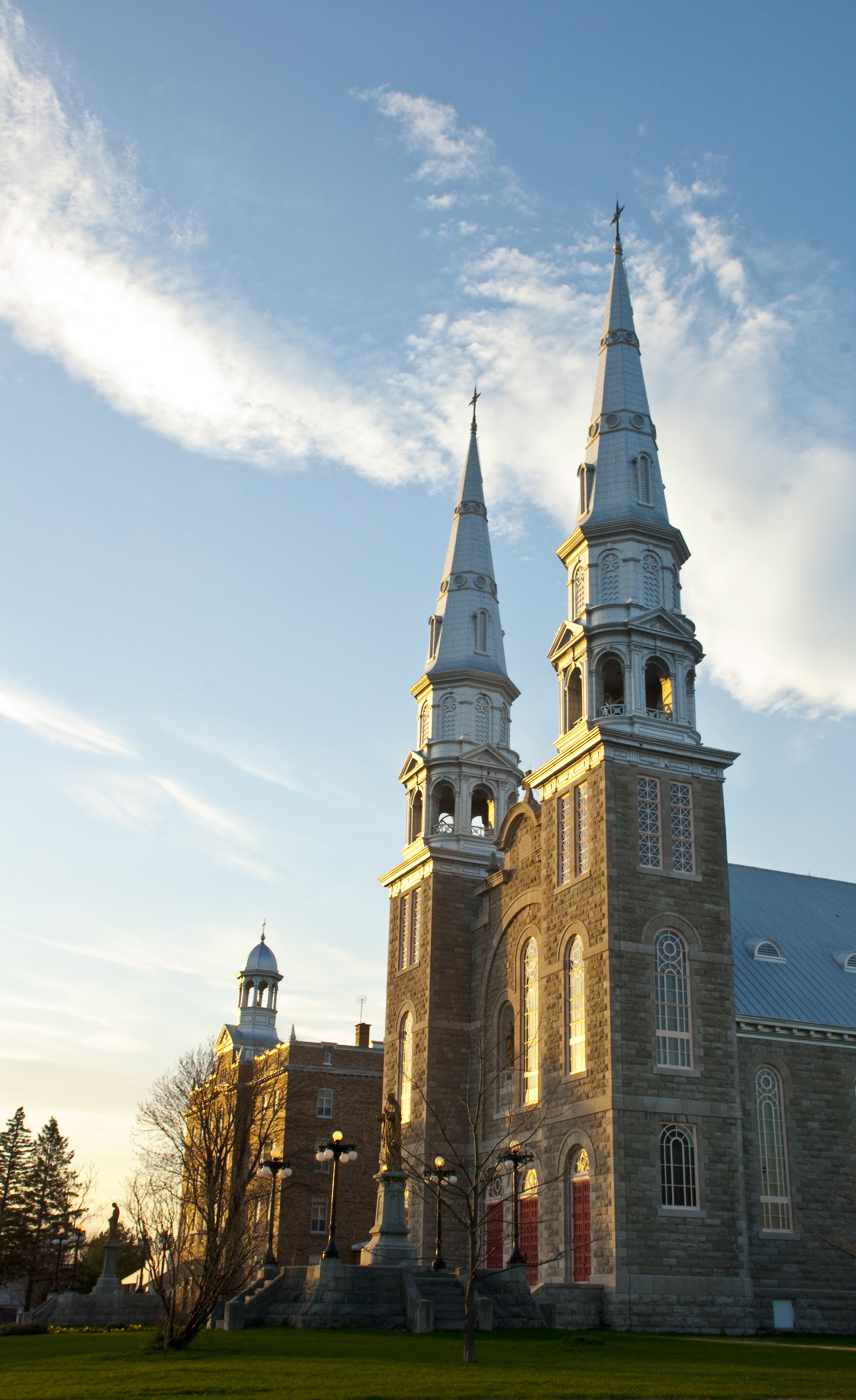
Built between 1915-1918, the Eglise-Saint-Jacques was built immediately after the original church burnt down.

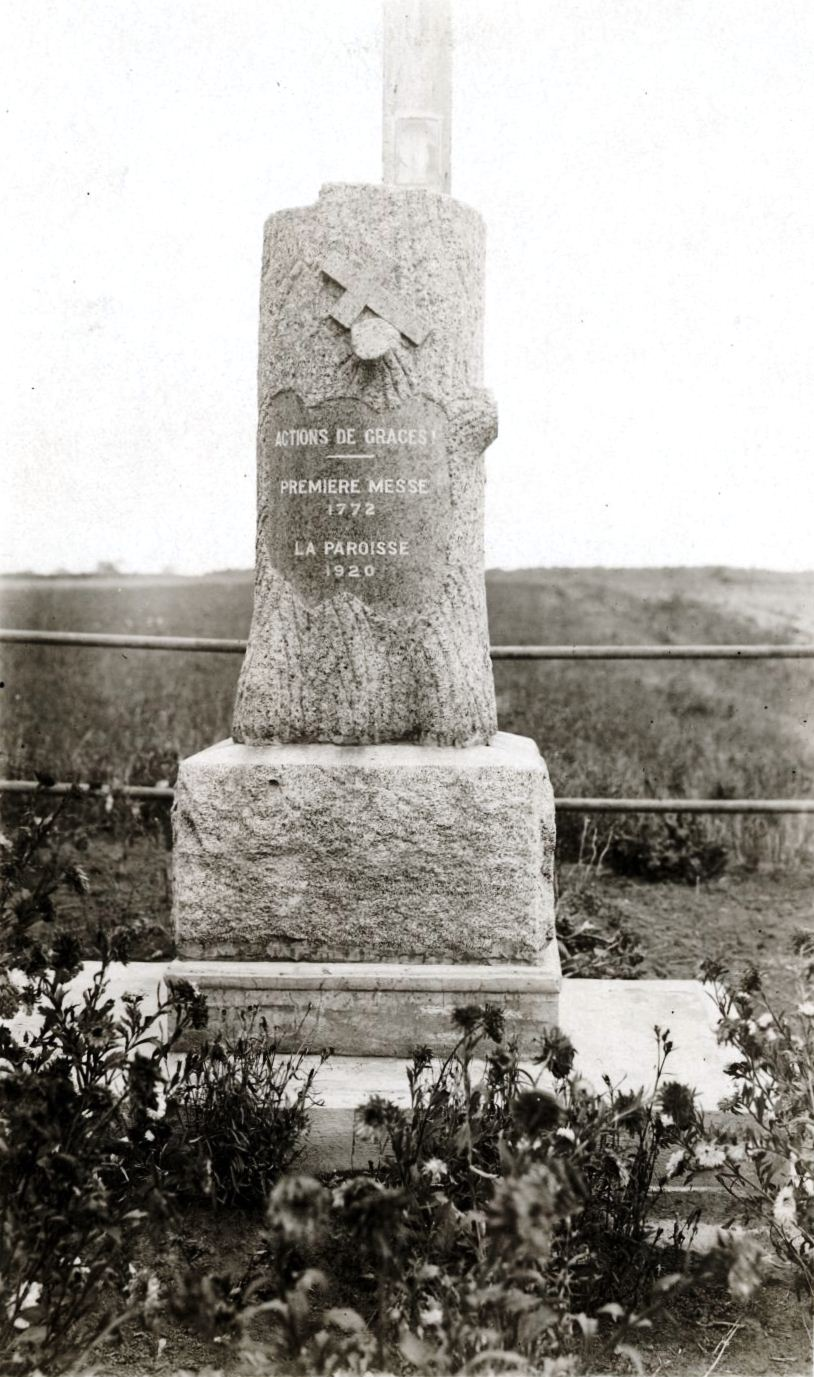
Built in 1920, Croix de Chemin, or Wayside Cross, commemorates the first mass at Bas-de-l’Église Nord.

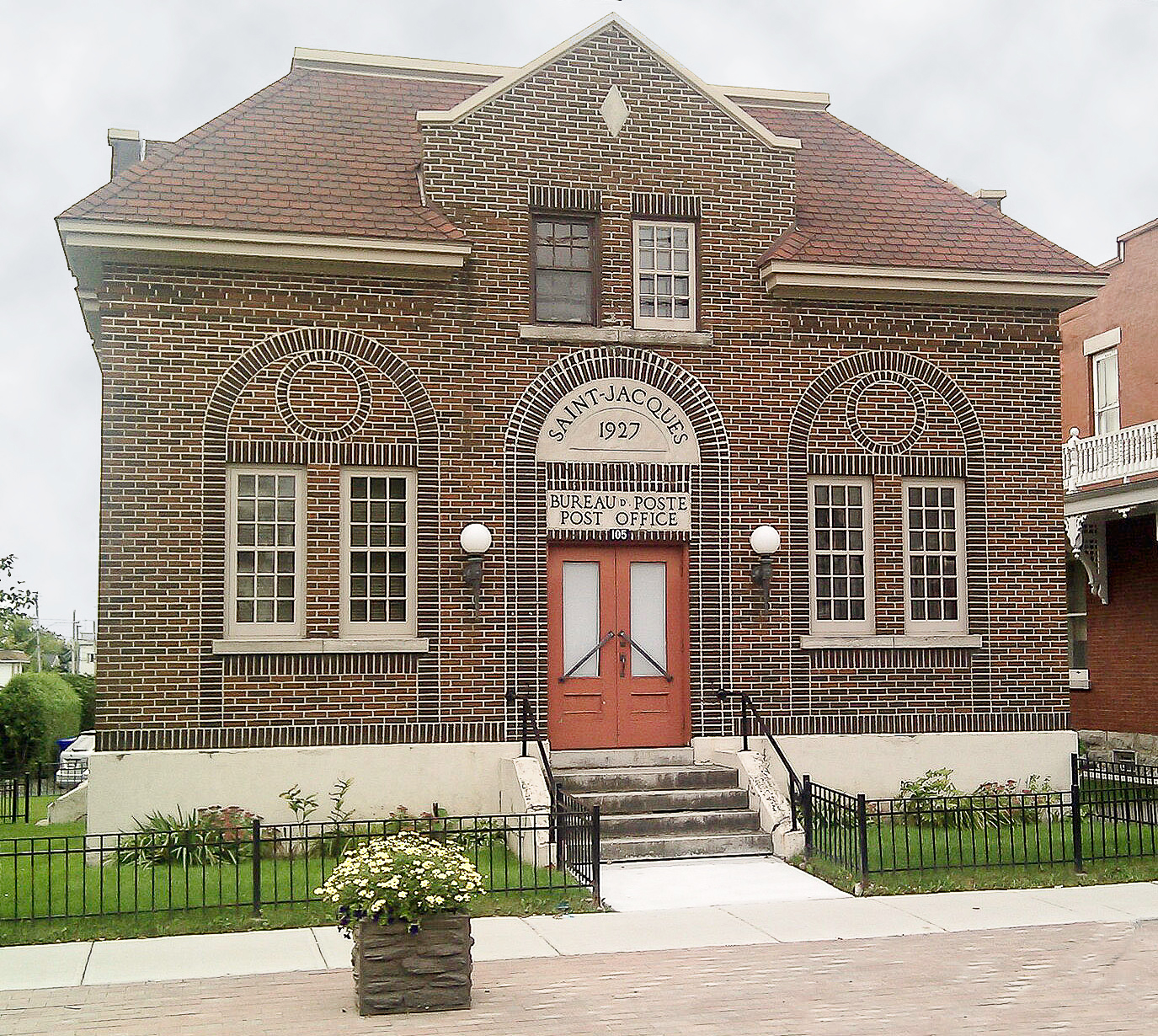
Built ca. 1927, l'Ancien Bureau de Poste is the earliest post office in the municipality. It is now on the Canadian Register of Historic Places.
