= Ouareau =

Ouareau may refer to:

- Camp Ouareau, a vacation camp, in Notre-Dame-de-la-Merci, Quebec, Canada
- Lake Ouareau, in municipality of Saint-Donat, Quebec, Canada
- Ouareau River, Saint-Paul, Quebec, Canada
- Forêt-Ouareau Regional Park, a regional park in Matawinie, Lanaudière, Quebec, Canada
