= Rouge River (Ouareau River) =

River in Canada

Location
- Country: Canada
- Province: Quebec
- Region: Lanaudière
- Regional County Municipality: Matawinie Regional County Municipality, Montcalm Regional County Municipality, Joliette Regional County Municipality

Physical characteristics
- Source: Couture lake
  - location: Chertsey
  - coordinates: 46°10′08″N 73°46′59″W
  - elevation: 284 m
- Mouth: Ouareau River
  - location: Crabtree
  - coordinates: 45°58′35″N 73°28′32″W
  - elevation: 31 m
- Length: 56.5 km (35.1 mi)

Basin features
- Progression: Ouareau River, L'Assomption River, Saint Lawrence River
- Tributaries
  - left: (upward from the mouth) Le Grand Ruisseau, Blanche River, outlet of Lac Marchand, outlet of Lac Pinatel, outlet of Lac Crépeau, outlet of Lac Gareau.
  - right: (upward from the mouth) Discharge from Lake at Shields, discharge from Lake Lévis, discharge from Lake Morgan, discharge from Lac à Foin and Lac Curley.

The Rivière Rouge (English: Red River) is a tributary of the Ouareau River, flowing in the administrative region of Lanaudière, in the province of Quebec, in Canada.

- MRC de Matawinie: municipalities of Chertsey, Saint-Alphonse-Rodriguez and Rawdon;
- MRC de Montcalm: Saint-Liguori;
- MRC of Joliette Regional County Municipality: municipalities of Saint-Ambroise-de-Kildare and Crabtree.

The course of the river passes on the south side of the village of Rawdon.

Forestry s the main economic activity in the upper part of the valley, but there is also agriculture in the middle and the lower parts except in the villages.

== Geography ==
The Red River takes its source at the mouth of Couture Lake (length: 0.8 km (0.50 mi); altitude: 281 m (922 ft)), taking the shape of a mushroom and located in the north-eastern part of Chertsey. The mouth of this lake is located 12.1 km (7.5 mi) west of the center of the village of Sainte-Béatrix, at 14.6 km (9.1 mi) north of the center of village of Rawdon, at 6.5 km (4.0 mi) east of the Ouareau river.

From the mouth of Couture Lake, the Rouge River flows over 56.5 km (35.1 mi), with a drop of 253 m (830 ft), according to the following segments:

Upper course of Rouge River (segment of 24.6 km (15.3 mi))

- 1.2 km (0.75 mi) towards the south-east, up to the limit of Saint-Alphonse-Rodriguez;
- 1.0 km (0.62 mi) north in Saint-Alphonse-Rodriguez, to the outlet of Lac Gareau (coming from the north);
- 2.8 km (1.7 mi) towards the northeast, to the northern end of Lac Gareau;
- 2.8 km (1.7 mi) towards the south, successively crossing Lac Joly, Lac de la Fromantière (length: 1.5 km (0.93 mi); altitude: 221 km (137 mi)) and Lake Dontigny (length: 1.3 km (0.81 mi); altitude: 221 km (137 mi)), to the dam to the south of the latter;
- 2.5 km (1.6 mi) south to the outlet of Morgan Lake (coming from the west);
- 0.8 km (0.50 mi) towards the south-east, along the limit between Saint-Alphonse-Rodriguez and Chertsey, to the outlet of lac Marchand (coming from the east);
- 3.6 km (2.2 mi) south into Chertsey, to the forest road bridge;
- 7.7 km (4.8 mi) southward, to the north shore of Rawdon lake;
- 2.2 km (1.4 mi) towards the south, crossing Rawdon lake (length: 2.9 km (1.8 mi); altitude: 155 m (509 ft)) over its full length, up to at the dam at its mouth. Note: Rawdon lake follows the shape of the letter L, the foot of which is oriented towards the east; this lake is located in the village of Rawdon;

Intermediate course of the Rouge River (segment of 31.9 km (19.8 mi))

From the mouth of Rawdon Lake, the Rouge River flows over:

- 2.6 km (1.6 mi) east passing north of the village, forming a hook south, then a large S, to the route 348 (Kildare Road);
- 8.2 km (5.1 mi) (or 2.9 km (1.8 mi) in a direct line) to the east, first forming a loop to the north, then two loops to the south, collecting the discharge (coming from the southwest) of Lake Joe which is located in the middle of a campground, and meandering until crossing the Nadeau road, until the confluence of the Blanche river (coming from the northwest );
- 6.8 km (4.2 mi) (or 4.1 km (2.5 mi) in a direct line) eastward, crossing Lane Road, 5th Rang Road/Wilfrid Road and chemin du 4th Rang, and winding up to the limit of Saint-Ambroise-de-Kildare;
- 1.1 km (0.68 mi) (or 0.5 km (0.31 mi) in a direct line) towards the south-east, winding up to the limit of Chertsey;
- 2.1 km (1.3 mi) (or 1.5 km (0.93 mi) in a direct line) south-east in Chertsey, winding up to the route 346 (rue Héroux-Rang Double);
- 5.5 km (3.4 mi) (or 2.3 km (1.4 mi) in a direct line) towards the southeast, collecting the waters of Le Grand Ruisseau (Red River) (coming from the north) and meandering to the edge of Crabtree;
- 5.6 km (3.5 mi) (or 4.4 km (2.7 mi) in a direct line) south-east in Crabtree, crossing the chemin Saint-Jacques and the route 158 at the end of the segment and winding up to the confluence of the river.

The Red River empties on the north bank of the Ouareau river which descends towards the southeast to the north bank of the L'Assomption River. This confluence is located at:

- 17.0 km (10.6 mi) northwest of the St. Lawrence River;
- 1.2 km (0.75 mi) north of the Crabtree bridge spanning the Ouareau river;
- 5.9 km (3.7 mi) southeast of downtown Joliette.

== Toponymy ==
The toponym Rivière Rouge was made official on December 5, 1968 at the Commission de toponymie du Québec.

== See also ==
- Matawinie Regional County Municipality
