= Ouareau River =

River in Lanaudière, Quebec, Canada

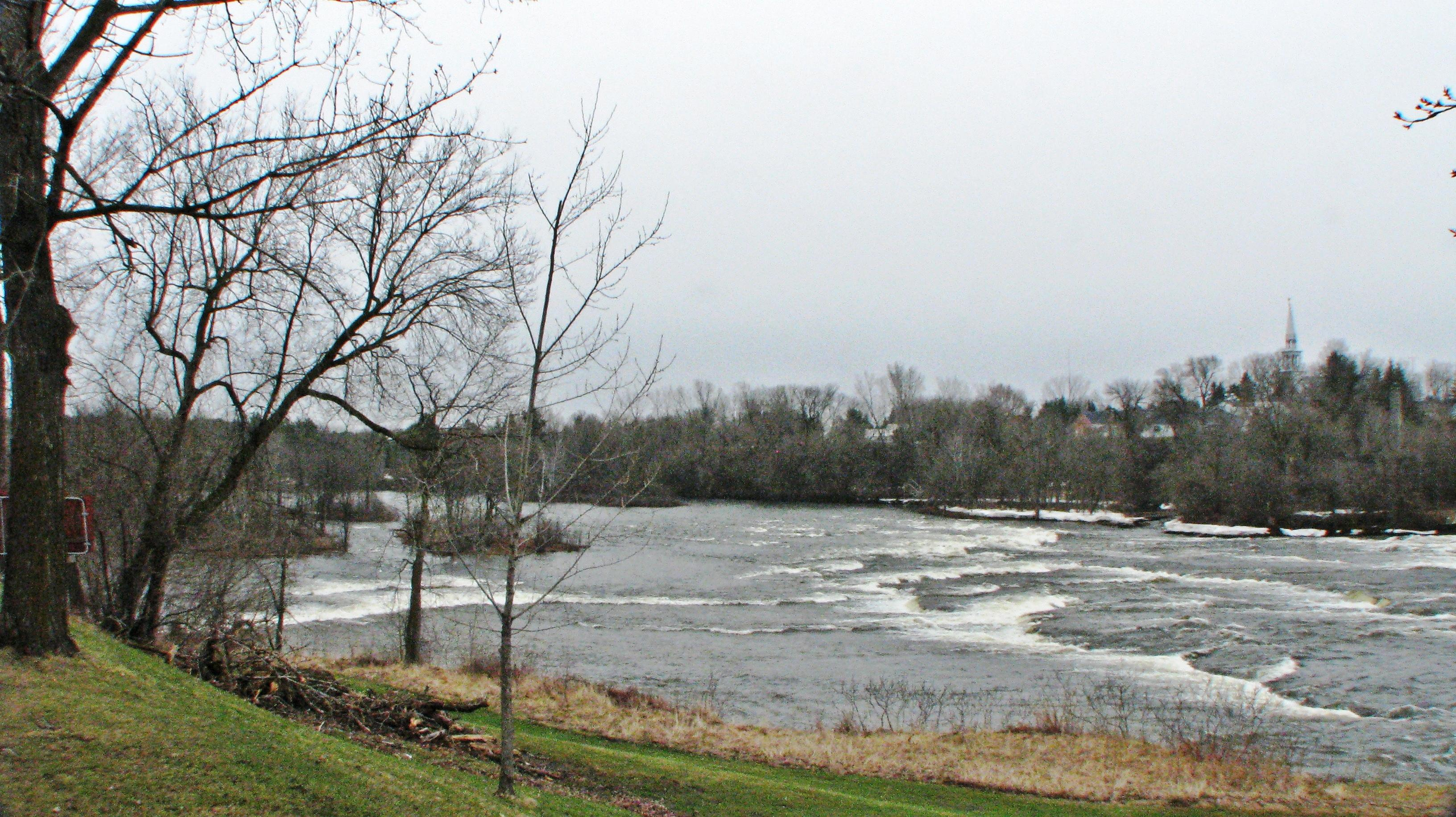
- Ouareau River in Saint-Liguori.

Location
- Country: Canada
- Province: Quebec
- Region: Lanaudière
- Regional County Municipalities: Matawinie Regional County Municipality, Montcalm Regional County Municipality and Joliette Regional County Municipality

Physical characteristics
- Source: Lake Ouareau
  - location: Saint-Donat, Quebec
  - coordinates: 46.317324°N 74.127811°W
  - elevation: 387 m (1,270 ft)
- Mouth: L'Assomption River
  - location: L'Épiphanie, Quebec (town)
  - coordinates: 45.94°N 73.4075°W
  - elevation: 9 m (30 ft)
- Length: 83.8 km (52.1 mi)

Basin features
- Tributaries
  - left: (Upward from the mouth) Rouge River, Trudel River, Gour Creek, Beaurivage Creek, North River, Cadieux Creek, outlet of the Lacs du Beaver, discharge from Lake Provost, from Lake to the Island, Lake Prévost, Lake Georges and Lac Blanc, Pagé Creek, discharge from Sombre Lake, Caribou Creek, discharge from Baribeau Lake.
  - right: (Upward from the mouth) Burton River, Jean-Venne River, Perreault brook, Paré lake outlet, Voir brook, Baulne River, Dufresne River, Lafrenière cove.

The Ouareau River is a tributary of the Assomption River crossing the administrative region of Lanaudière, in Quebec, in Canada.

- MRC of Matawinie Regional County Municipality: municipalities of Saint-Donat, Notre-Dame-de-la-Merci, Chertsey, Rawdon;
- MRC of Montcalm Regional County Municipality: municipalities of Sainte-Julienne, Saint-Liguori, Saint-Jacques;
- MRC of Joliette Regional County Municipality: municipalities of Crabtree, Saint-Paul.

The course of the river passes near the villages of Chertsey, Rawdon, Saint-Liguori and Crabtree.

The lower part of the Ouareau valley is served mainly by (from the mouth): the route 346, the route 125, the chemin Archambault at Crabtree, chemin du rang de l'Église (at Saint-Liguori, route 343 and boulevard Pontbriand.

The surface of the Ouareau River (except the rapids areas) is generally frozen from mid-December to the end of March; safe circulation on the ice is generally done from the end of December to the beginning of March. The water level of the river varies with the seasons and the precipitation.

== Geography ==
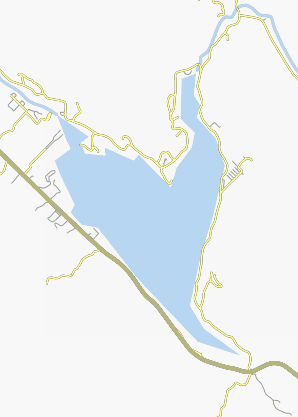
Geography of Lake Ouareau

The Ouareau river has its source in the territory of the municipality of Saint-Donat-de-Montcalm, 12.4 km from the village (by Ouareau North road), at the dam erected at the northeast mouth of Lake Ouareau (length: 7.6 kilometres (4.7 mi); width: 4.1 kilometres (2.5 mi); altitude: 387 metres (1,270 ft)). The mouth of this lake is located 14.4 kilometres (8.9 mi) north of the village of Notre-Dame-de-la-Merci (via the 125 and the chemin St-Guillaume), 50.4 kilometres (31.3 mi) northwest of the village center of Rawdon, 71.8 kilometres (44.6 mi) northwest of the center-town of Joliette.

It descends in a south-easterly direction, traversing some 83.8 kilometres (52.1 mi). In its course, it receives the waters of:

- Pagé Creek
- Dufresne River
- Beaulne River
- Noir stream
- Beaurivage Creek
- Gour stream
- Trudel River
- Rivière du Nord (Ouareau River)
- Jean-Venne River
- Burton River
- Rouge River
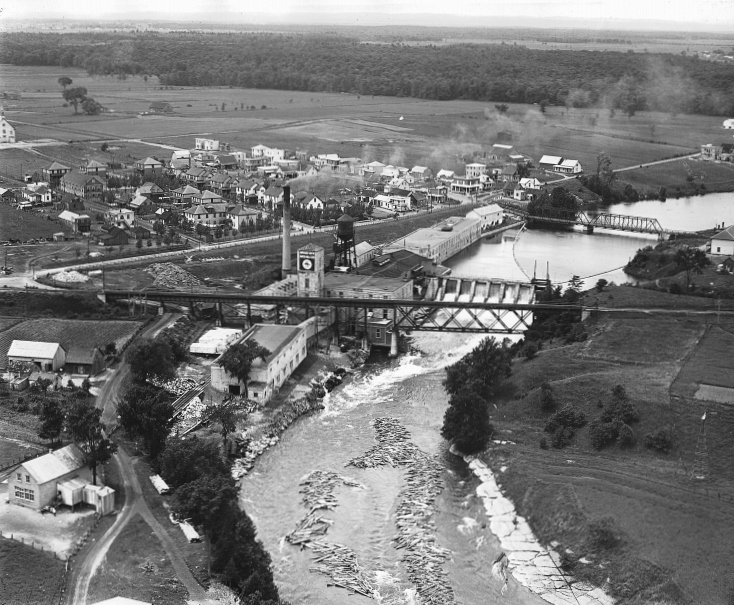
Crabtree, 1925

From the dam at the mouth of lake Ouareau, the Ouareau river flows over 83.8 kilometres (52.1 mi) according to the following segments:

Upper course of the Ouareau river (segment of 23.0 kilometres (14.3 mi))

- 1.9 kilometres (1.2 mi) north-east in Saint-Donat, crossing the southern part of lac Chambord (which receives the waters of lac Croche), until at the bridge on Chemin Saint-Guillaume;
- 2.9 kilometres (1.8 mi) towards the south-east, collecting the waters of the outlet of Lac Sombre (coming from the East), up to the limit of Notre-Dame-de-la-Merci;
- 3.7 kilometres (2.3 mi) south-east in the canton of Chilton, in the municipality of Notre-Dame-de-la-Merci, up to Crique Lafrenière (coming from Where is);
- 6.6 kilometres (4.1 mi) towards the south-east, crossing Les Cinq Chutes, up to the bridge of the route 347;
- 7.9 kilometres (4.9 mi) towards the south-east, collecting at the start of the segment the discharge from a group of lakes (Lac à l'Île, Prévost, Georges and Blanc), collecting the waters of the discharge (coming from the East) from the Lacs du Castor and the North River (Ouareau River) (coming from the northeast) and crossing the Ouareau Forest Regional Park, until bordering on Chertsey;

Intermediate course of the Ouareau river (segment of 31.0 kilometres (19.3 mi))

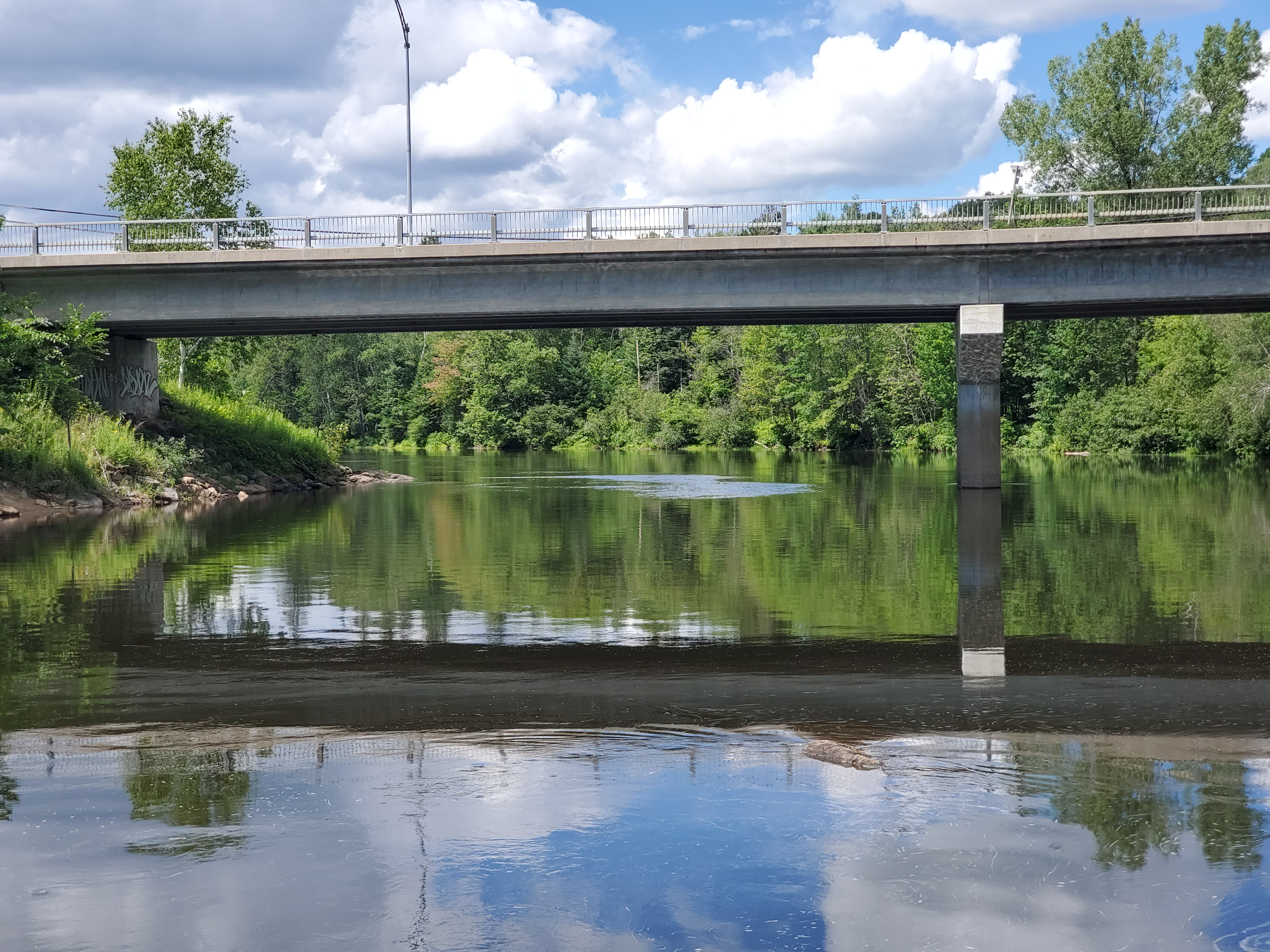
Route 348 bridge spanning the Ouareau River, in Rawdon, Lanaudière, Quebec in late July. This bridge is located southwest of the village.

- 8.5 kilometres (5.3 mi) southwards in Chertsey, collecting the waters of the Baulne River (coming from the west), of the Black stream (coming from the west), from the North river (coming from the north), and bypassing the village of Grande-Vallée on the east side, up to the outlet of the lake Beavers, located south of the village;
- 5.5 kilometres (3.4 mi) to the south, collecting the waters of Beaurivage brook (coming from the northeast) and Perreault brook (coming from the west), up to the bridge on Chemin de l'Église;
- 2.2 kilometres (1.4 mi) towards the south by crossing rapids and falls, until the confluence of the Jean-Venne River (coming from the west);
- 3.8 kilometres (2.4 mi) to the south, crossing several rapids and falls, until the confluence of the Burton River;
- 0.9 kilometres (0.56 mi) south-east, until the limit of Rawdon;
- 3.7 kilometres (2.3 mi) south-east in Rawdon, to Les Cascades rapids, located at the entrance to Lac Pontbriand;
- 6.4 kilometres (4.0 mi) to the east, crossing Pontbriand Lake (altitude: 157 kilometres (98 mi)) over its full length, to the Rawdon dam, located in the village of Rawdon;

Lower course of the Ouareau river (segment of 29.8 kilometres (18.5 mi))

- 3.2 kilometres (2.0 mi) towards the south-east, passing south of Rawdon and under the bridge of the route 348 in Mansonville (on the shore southwest), to the route 337 bridge (1e Avenue);
- 8.8 kilometres (5.5 mi) south-east, passing through the Parc des Chutes-Dorwin south of Rawdon, crossing Manchester Falls and forming the boundary between Saint-Jacques and Saint-Liguori, to the bridge at route 341;
- 1.0 kilometre (0.62 mi) towards the south-east, forming the limit between Saint-Jacques and Saint-Liguori;
- 4.5 kilometres (2.8 mi) south-east, up to the route 346 bridge in the village of Saint-Liguori;
- 4.8 kilometres (3.0 mi) towards the south-east, bypassing Archange-Godbout Island, up to the limit of Crabtree;
- 3.6 kilometres (2.2 mi) south-east in Crabtree, to route 158;
- 1.1 kilometres (0.68 mi) south-east, until the confluence of the Rouge River (coming from the north-west);
- 2.8 kilometres (1.7 mi) towards the south-east, passing by the village of Crabtree which is located on the south-west bank of the Ouareau river;
- 1.6 kilometres (0.99 mi) towards the south-east, forming the limit between Crabtree and Saint-Paul;
- 3.4 kilometres (2.1 mi) to the south-east, forming a large S to Pointe à Forget where the confluence of the river is located.

The Ouareau River flows on the west bank of the Assomption River, at the end of Pointe à Forget, in the municipality of Saint-Paul, at south of the city of Joliette. This confluence is located at:

- 11.6 kilometres (7.2 mi) north-west of the St. Lawrence River;
- 5.6 kilometres (3.5 mi) south-east of the Crabtree bridge;
- 9.4 kilometres (5.8 mi) south of downtown Joliette.

== Toponymy ==
Its name comes from Algonquin and means in the distance.

The river Ouareau toponym was formalized on December 5, 1968, at the Commission de toponymie du Québec.

== Ecology ==
The water quality is better upstream of Crabtree than downstream, where we observe a decline in the quality of the fish, due to urban, industrial and agricultural pollution.

=== See also ===
- List of rivers of L'Assomption basin
- List of rivers of Quebec
