= Forêt-Ouareau Regional Park =

Park in Matawinie, Québec, Canada

Coordinates: 46.21°N 73.96°W

- (in French) Parc régional de la Forêt-Ouareau
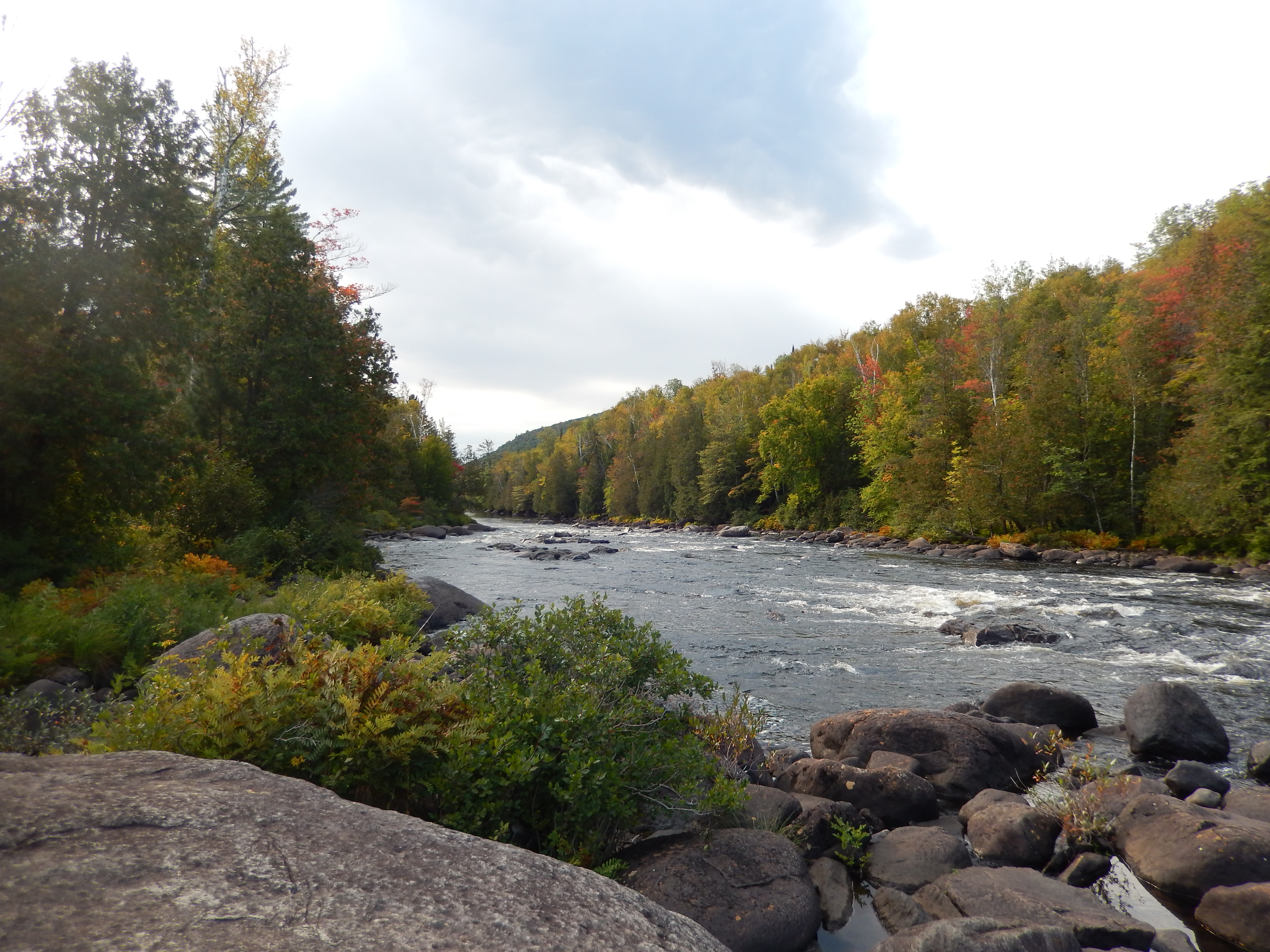
- Ouareau River crossing the park.
- Interactive map of Forêt-Ouareau Regional Park
- Location: Notre-Dame-de-la-Merci, Chersey, Matawinie and Antoine-Labelle RCMs, Quebec, Canada
- Nearest city: Chertsey

The Parc régional de la Forêt-Ouareau ((in English) Forêt-Ouareau Regional Park) is a park for outdoor activities, in the regional county municipality (MRC) of Matawinie, in the administrative region of Lanaudière, in Quebec, in Canada. This park extends in the municipalities of Notre-Dame-de-la-Merci, Entrelacs, Saint-Côme (small area) and Chertsey.

Visitors can access the trails and other sites in the park from the following sectors: Massif, Grande-Jetée, Grande-Vallée, Suspension Bridge and Foothills. The main entrance is located on the east side of the village Notre-Dame-de-la-Merci; a second entrance is located north of the village of Chertsey, between the Grande-Jetée sector and the Grande-Vallée sector of the park.

== Toponymy ==
The Forêt-Ouareau regional park takes the name of the Ouareau River which crosses it. "Ouareau" is an original Algonquin word which means "far away." The name appears on a map by surveyor William Rankins in 1789 under my mention "The river Lac Ouareau". The toponym was made official on September 24, 2003, at the Place Names Bank of the Commission de toponymie du Québec.

== Geography ==
This regional park extends over more than 150 km^{2} (58 sq mi) in a territory more or less resembling the rounded cap of a silo. This park has a length of 16.45 km (10.22 mi) and a width of 14.9 km (9.3 mi). The territory of the park is located north of the village of Chertsey and south of Mont-Tremblant National Park, namely between:

- Route 125 which more or less delimits the western limit of the park;
- the Dufresne River which delimits the north-western limit of the park;
- the Route 347 which more or less delimits the northern part of the park;
- the southwestern limit of the municipality of Saint-Côme (except for a small area).

The Ouareau River crosses this park to the south-east. The multifunctional bridge spanning the Ouareau River is located in the south-eastern part of the park, between the Grande-Jetée sector and the Grande-Vallée sector. The other main streams crossing the park are: riviere du Nord, the Beaurivage stream, Versailles River, Dufresne River, Kenny River and Beaulne River.

The park includes the mountains of Grande-Ourse (altitude: 660 m (2,170 ft)), Tête-Dure (altitude: 645 m (2,116 ft)) and mount 107 (altitude: 635 m (2,083 ft))

== Main activities of the park ==
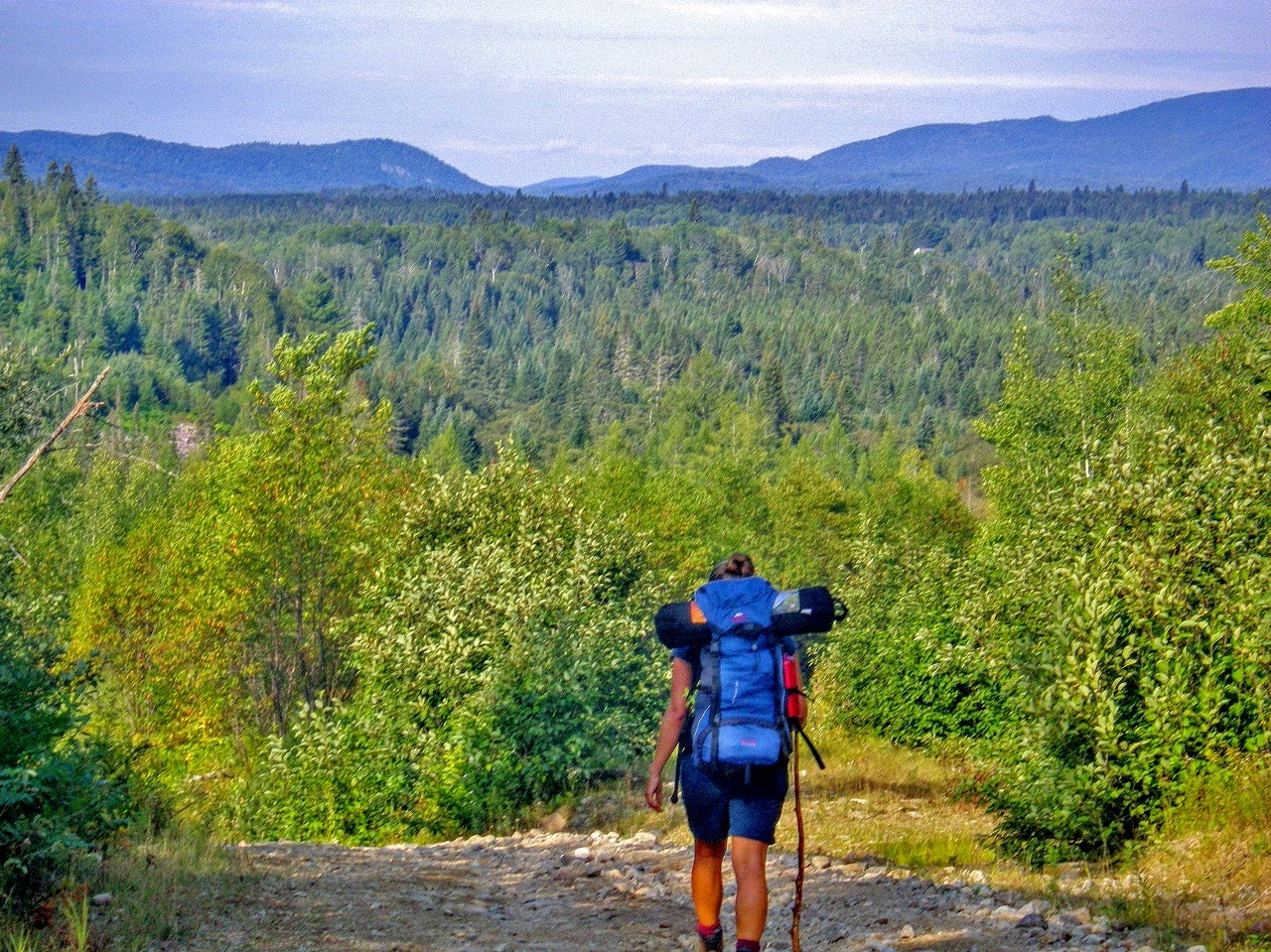
Hiker near the National Trail.

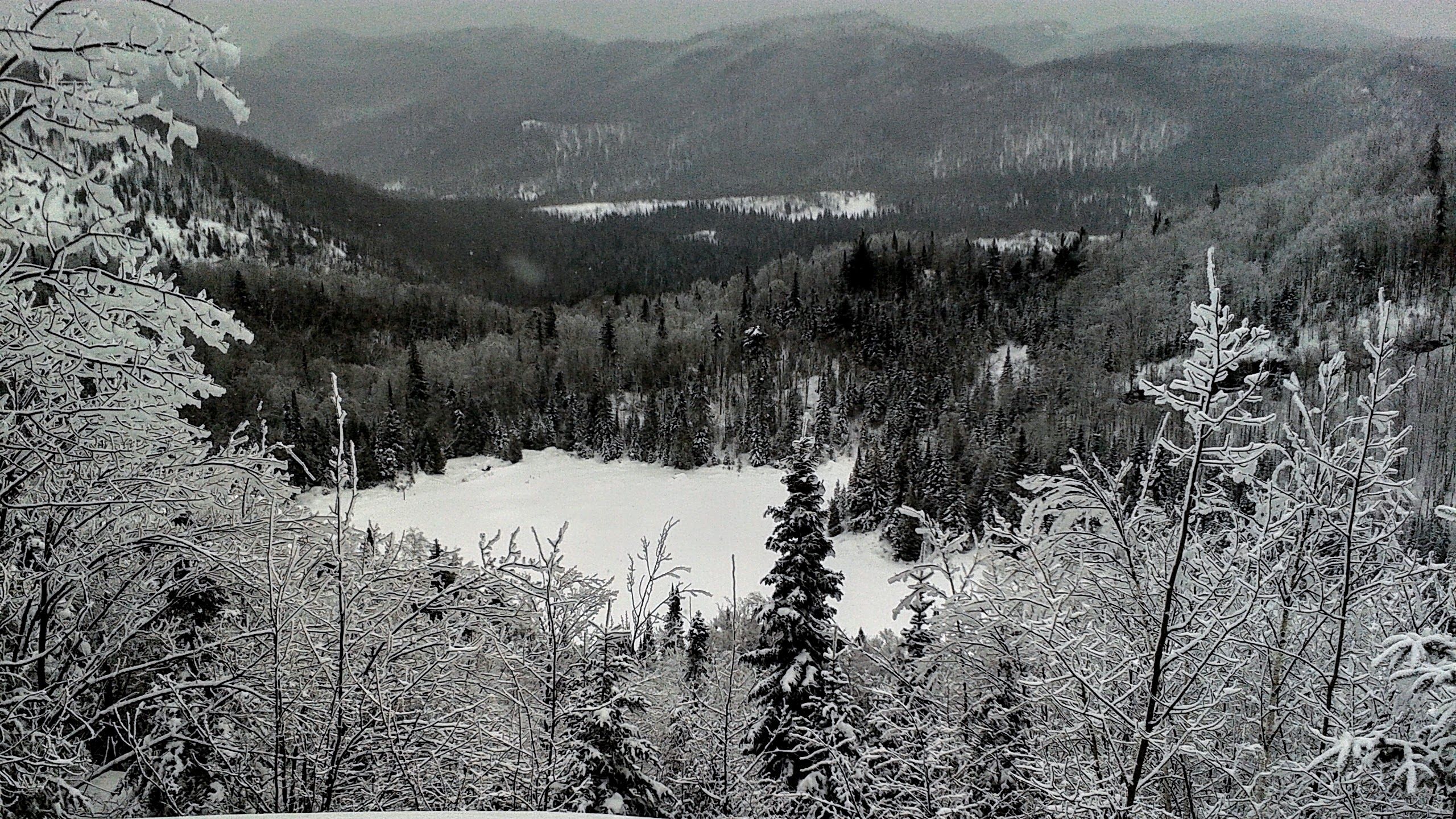
View of the hills of the park from the National Trail in winter

This regional park has a network of multifunctional trails (walking, cycling, cross-country skiing and snowshoeing) over more than 120 km (75 mi). Some trails go through the mountain range of the park. In addition, the Ouareau Forest highlights many wild lakes. Stopovers can climb three climbing walls at Lac Blanc and the Murmures Trail; these walls are recognized and managed by the Quebec Federation of Mountain and Climbing.

Visitors can also rent snowshoes, canoes, etc. Activities on the Ouareau River are dependent on conditions related to temperature and water level.

About ten hebertism game modules are available in the Pont-Suspendu sector. In addition, fun games for children are available at the Pont-suspension campsite or at the Capucines refuge, in the heart of a pine forest.

During the summer, enthusiasts can practice mountain biking in the cross-country ski trails. In winter, snowshoers can venture out particularly in the Massif sector. In addition, ski touring is popular: classic cross-country skiing (30 km) or Nordic, because of the exceptional snow conditions. In winter, the park provides the public with two tube sliding lanes in the Massif sector, at Notre-Dame-de-la-Merci.

The new Petite Rivière du Nord trail was inaugurated in 2016, in the Grande-Jetée sector, in Chertsey. This is an educational and family trail, with five interpretive panels that highlight the life cycle of the brook trout and its habitat.

The amateurs can indulge in sport fishing. Each angler must hold a valid provincial license and apply the rules for sport fishing.

In addition, an accommodation service (by reservation) in rustic camping, in a chalet or in one of the five shelters is offered by the park. To facilitate access to the shelters, the park offers a luggage transport service. The park also offers taxi and bus transportation.

Park users are required to follow the fire index, which varies according to weather conditions.

=== Footpaths ===
The park offers ideas for day to day hikes on marked trails to enjoy the wilderness.

Day hikes

| No. | Name | Length | Difficulty level | Trail entrance | Notes |
|---|---|---|---|---|---|
| 1 | Cross viewpoint loop | 2.5 km (1.6 mi) | Intermediate | Massif sector (Notre-Dame-de-la-Merci) | Summer Winter |
| 2 | Mont-Prud'homme loop Including the outward and return trip via km 1 and 2 of the National Trail. | 7.4 km (4.6 mi) | Intermediate | Massif sector (Notre-Dame-de-la-Merci) | Summer Winter. |
| 3 | The views of the Sentier du Massif (National trail, via loops A and B) | 12.5 km (7.8 mi) | Difficult | Massif sector (Notre-Dame-de-la-Merci) | Summer/winter |
| 4 | The Pelletier refuge | 4 km (2.5 mi) | Intermediate | Massif sector (Notre-Dame-de-la-Merci) | Summer / winter |
| 5 | La Loutre refuge | 8 km (5.0 mi) | Intermediate | Massif sector (Notre-Dame-de-la-Merci) | Summer / winter |
| 6 | The summit | 7.8 km (4.8 mi) | Intermediate | Grande-Vallée sector (Chertsey) | Summer / winter |
| 7 | Les Murmures | Varied | Easy | Pont Suspendu or Grande-Jetée sector | Summer |
| 8 | Little rivière du Nord trail | 4.0 km (2.5 mi) | Easy to intermediate | Grande-Jetée sector (Chertsey) | Summer |
