= Camp Ouareau =

Canadian summer camp

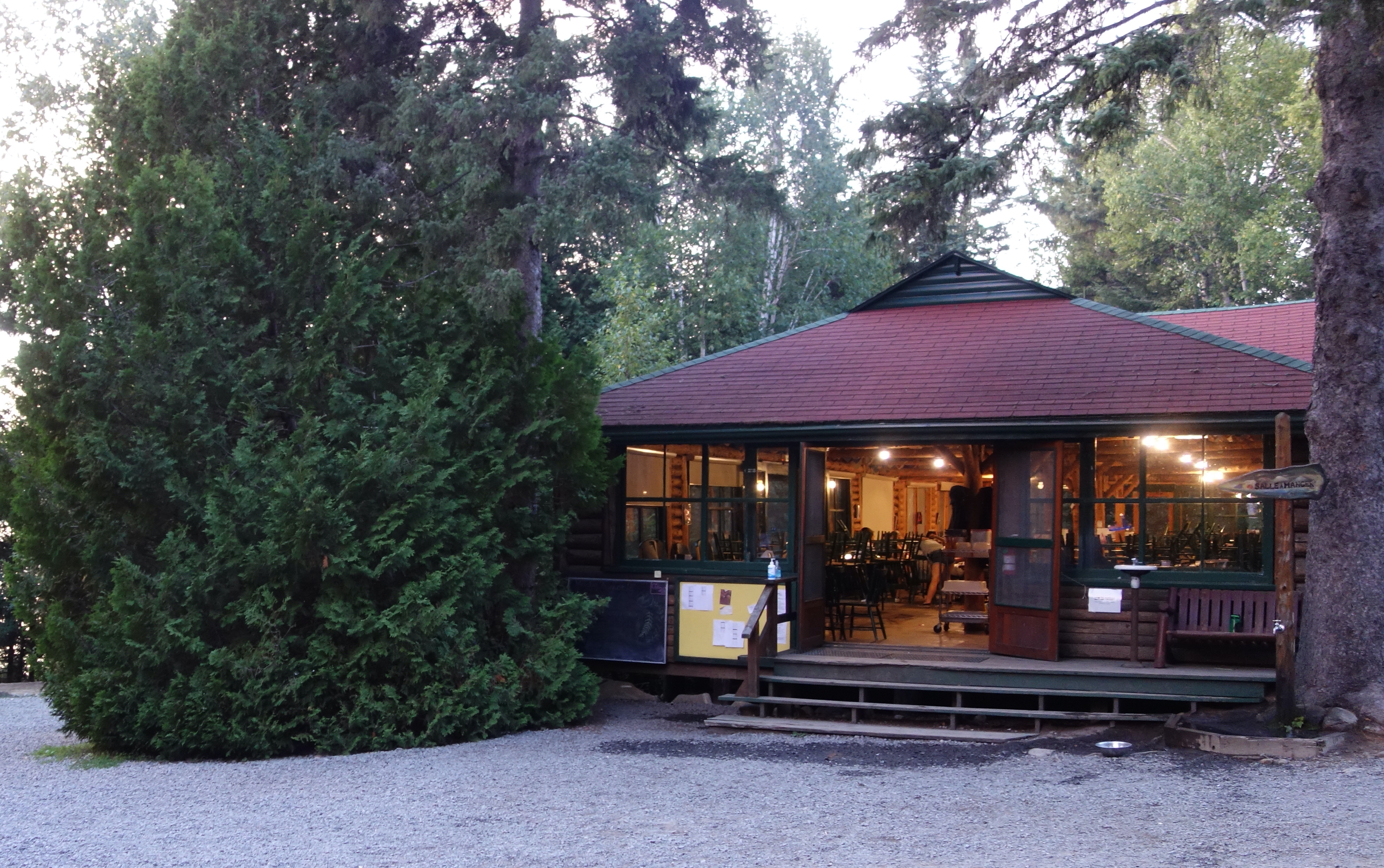
- Main entrance to the Dining Room at Camp Ouareau

- Location within Quebec
- Coordinates: 46.250°N 74.122°W
- Elevation: 403
- Type: Vacation camp
- Season: Summer
- Operated by: Camp Ouareau inc
- Owner: Jacqui Raill et Don Raill
- Established: 1922
- Closed: September
- Website: www.ouareau.com

The Camp Ouareau, established in 1922, is one of the two oldest summer camps exclusively dedicated to young girls and still active in Canada. Camp Ouareau is located at Notre-Dame-de-la-Merci, in the regional county municipality (MRC) of Matawinie, in the administrative region of Lanaudière, Quebec, Canada.

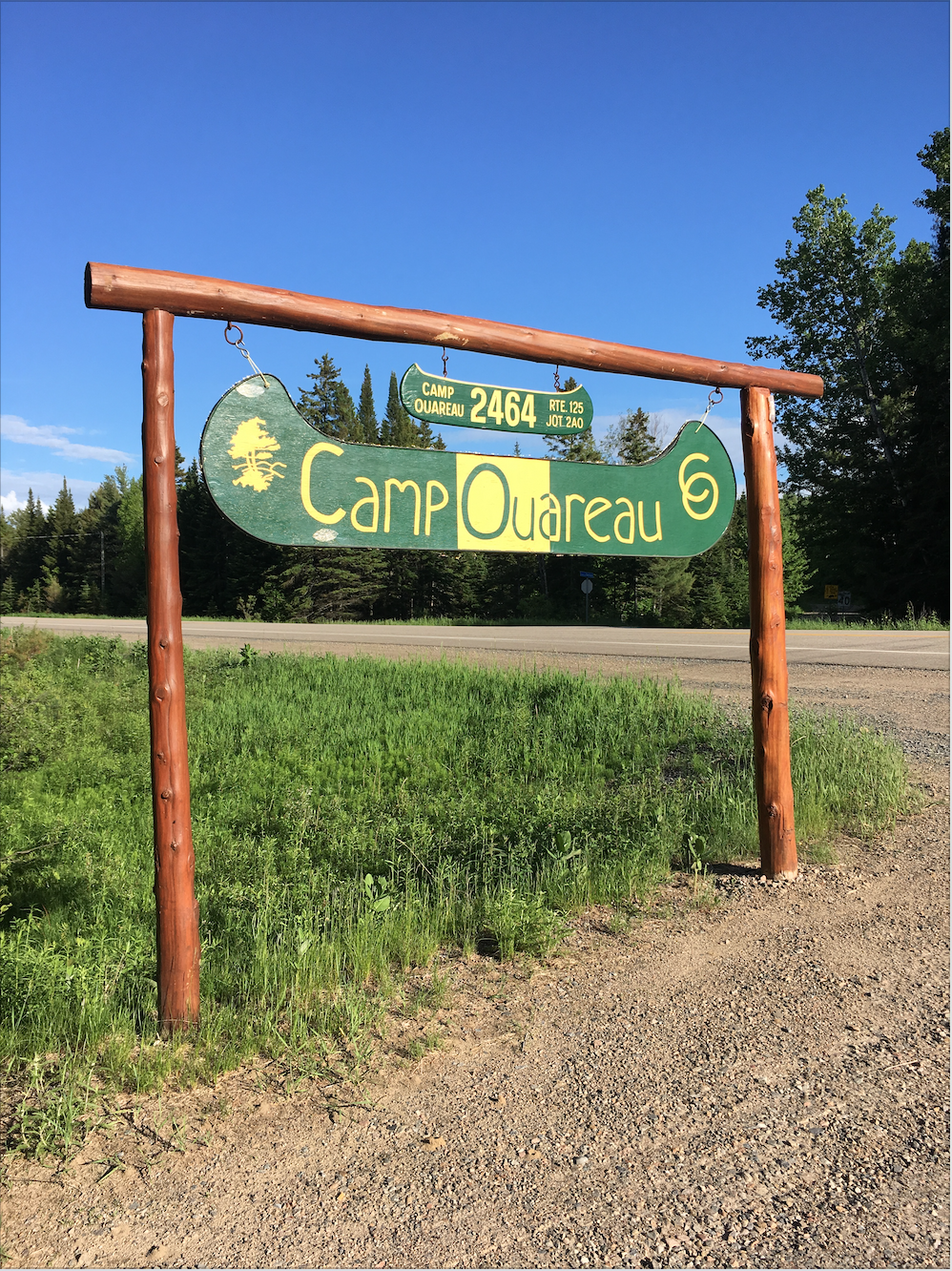
Sign at the entrance to Camp Ouareau

== Mission ==
In 1922, the original mission of this English-speaking camp for young girls, above all for girls wishing, in addition to the pleasures of life in the open air, courses in land and water sports, horse riding, the study of nature, crafts, etc., and the opportunity to go camping and canoeing expeditions in the great outdoors. This summer camp also received groups of adults in late summer and early fall.

This vacation colony has perpetuated its fundamental mission and traditions since its foundation. Today, the camp's mission is: "Camp Ouareau, where girls and young women can discover and be who they really are."

Although camp activities were conducted in English until 1976, a minority of French-speaking campers signed up. In 1976, the camp became bilingual with the introduction of the language program; now about 50% of registrations come from French-speaking girls and 50% from English-speaking people. Since 1976, activities at the camp have been carried out for two days in French and two days in English, alternating and language courses are offered; the objective being to ensure an exchange of language and cultures while discovering the different activities of camp life.

== Geography ==
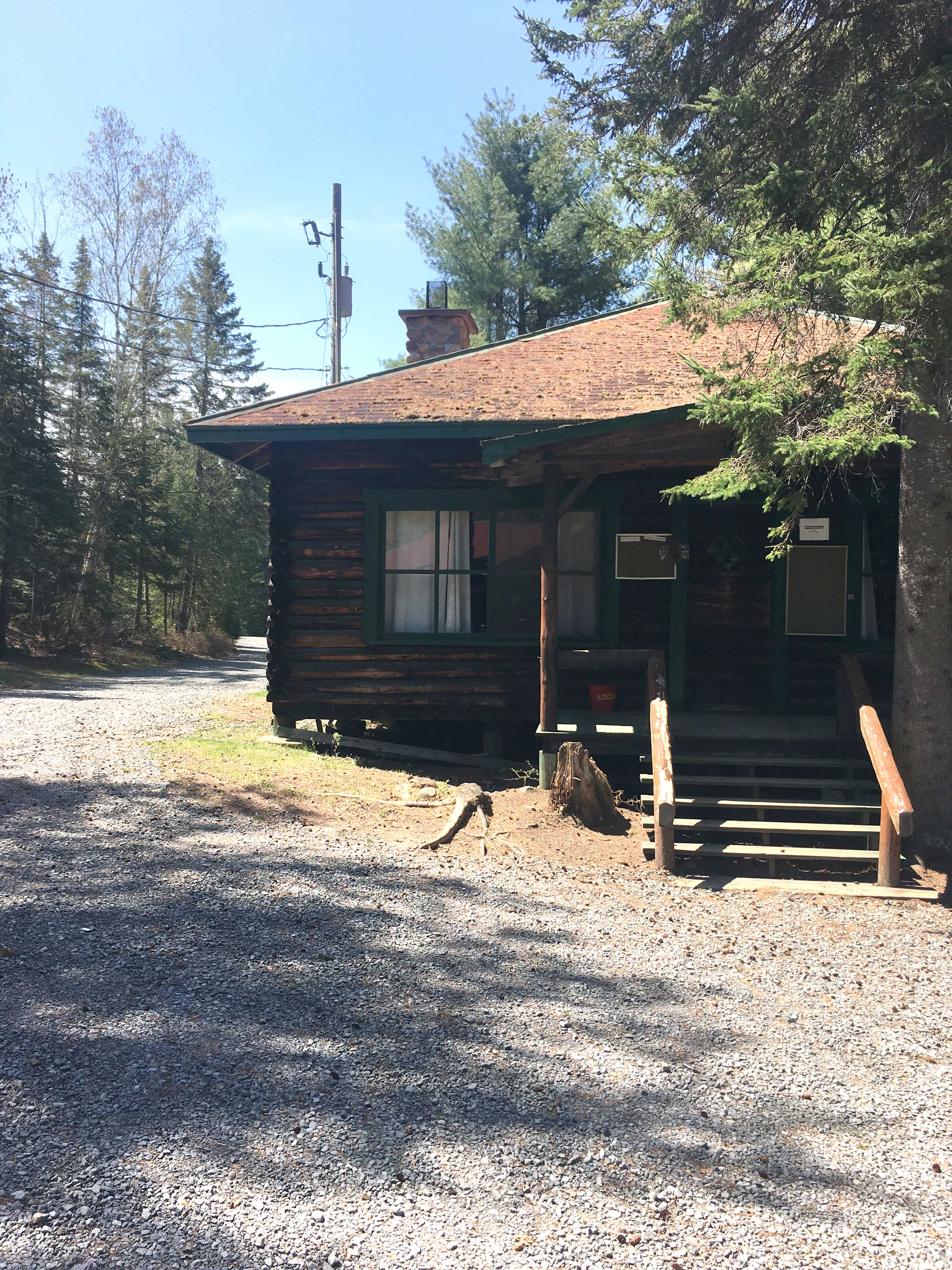
View of the Lodge of Camp Ouareau

Camp Ouareau is located in a forest zone on the north side of route 125. The estate includes a peninsula on the south side of Leguerrier Bay, as well as two islands on Lake Ouareau. Lac Ouareau is connected to the Ouareau River via a strait leading to lake Archambault.

The camp site covers 14.5 hectares and stretches for 0.25 km along the southern shore of Leguerrier Bay of Lac Ouareau. The main entrance to the camp is located on the east side of the trailhead leading to Mont Ouareau.

== Buildings and other facilities ==
In 1922, the two main buildings were a recreation building and a spacious log lodge. The recreation building featured a large stone fireplace, and was equipped with a stage, library area, desks, games, piano and gramophone. Outdoor amenities included a diving raft, row boats, canoes, tennis court, playgrounds and a horse riding course.

In 2020, the site included a dining room, lodge (main building), multifunction building with a teaching kitchen (called Le Chalet), 30 chalets, 17 Prospector-style tents, beach (with four docks), 45-foot artificial climbing wall, toilets and showers, as well as seven other buildings used as offices, or to host activities. Five of the six original buildings, built in 1921 or 1922, are still in use today, including:

- the dining room which was fitted with glass in 1937 and which was enlarged a few decades ago;
- the Lodge which was renovated in 1939.

Camp Ouareau never had a building specifically serving as a chapel. In the past, Sunday morning gatherings were held either in the lodge (in case of rain) or in an outdoor space designated "chapel"; this space has moved a lot over the years depending on the construction of new cabins or tents. The Ouareau camp archives keep a large collection of religious music, especially in Latin and English. The camp still has a small portable organ which is no longer in use. Today, the Ouareau camp no longer holds religious services or rituals; however, the space once occupied by the chapel is used for campfires and various activities.

== Sporting and cultural activities ==
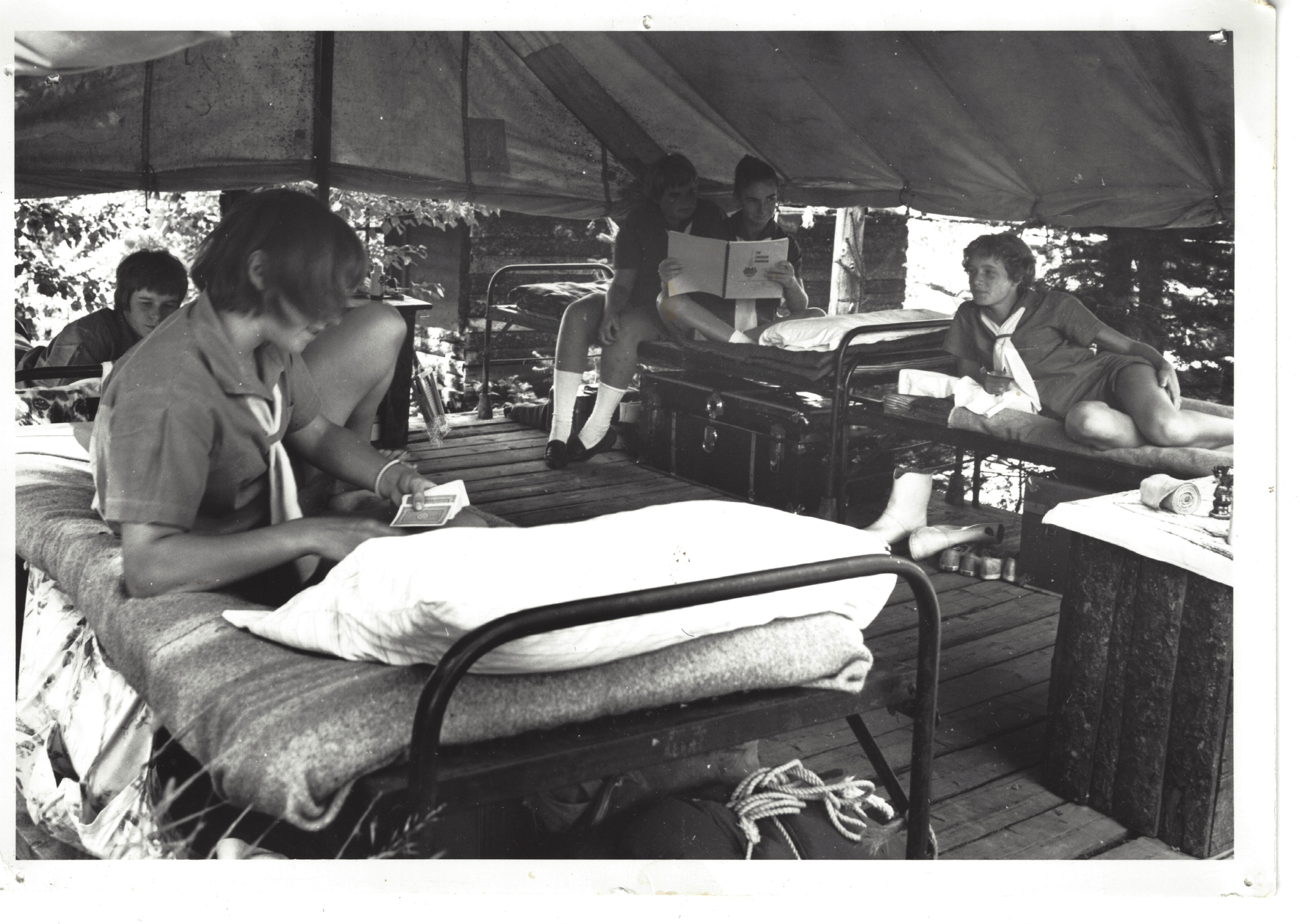
Campers playing in their tent at Camp Ouareau, 1940s

In 2020, the camp had a capacity of 143 campers each 2-week session and nearly 500 campers aged 6 to 16 each summer. The camp is divided into three age groups, called units Nova (6–11 years old), Luna (12–13 years old) and Senior (14–16 years old). An 8-week Apprentice Monitor program is also available to campers aged 16.

The sports activities offered by the camp include: swimming, canoeing, kayaking, windsurfing, sailing, survival in the forest, hebertism, archery, climbing, tennis, basketball. The non-sporting activities organized by the camp include: plastic arts, pottery, dance, theater, language courses and culinary arts.

The camp also offers a language program which encourages campers to develop their language skills. The program is split into four levels (Understand, Speak, Conversation, Extended). Campers get the opportunity to practice their French and English skills throughout their time at camp, during meals and activities.

== History of Camp Ouareau ==
Camp Ouareau was established in 1922, the same year as Glen Bernard Camp in Huntsville, Ontario; these two camps are the oldest camps still in operation in Canada and which are exclusive to young girls.

In 1921, Mabel C. Jamieson and Ferna G. Halliday; both then residents of Montreal, jointly acquired the land from Mr. Leguerrier, where Camp Ouareau will be located. These two university women and teachers already had considerable experience of camping and summer camp activities. From 1918 to 1921, Miss Halliday served as secretary of the Christian Association of Young Women of Montreal; she was also responsible for young girls at Camp Oolahwan in the Laurentians.

=== The main directors of Camp Ouareau ===
In the spring of 1922, Ferna G. Halliday was on an information tour, notably to Sherbrooke, to promote the opening of the camp to young girls. Miss Halliday co-directed the camp in 1922 and 1923. She then became the director of Camp Oconto which began operations in the summer of 1924 in Tichborne, north of Kingston, Ontario. Both camps continued to operate on the same mission and following similar traditions, including opening and closing rituals, which include a candlelight ceremony with classical music, poetry, and tableaux vivants.

From 1924, Mabel C. Jamieson directed the operations of Camp Ouareau. In 1915, she was National Student Secretary of the Christian Association of Young Women of Canada. After completing her studies in 1918 at Pupils College in Richmond, she became secretary general of the Y.M.C.A. of Montreal at least from 1915 to 1920, and was a member of the Committee of the Sixteen in 1919 which had received the mandate to purify morals in Montreal. She made a career in teaching.

Dorothy Percival became director of Camp Ouareau in 1934, then she acquired the site in 1937.

Joyce Bertram became manager in 1954 and owner the same year, having purchased from Mrs. Percival. Bertram had composed several songs for the camp, several of which are still sung today. She was also the program coordinator at Havergal College in Toronto until 1985. She was editor of the Canadian Camping Association journal and has also published there; most can be viewed online. She was the recipient of the Honorary Life Member Award from the Ontario Camp Association.

Madeleine Ferguson Allen became director and owner in 1971. In 1976, she implemented the language program that kept the camp going. At the end of her career, she was a writer and was deeply involved in the Lennoxville municipal library where she resided.

Jacqui Raill became director in 1994. She and her husband, Don Raill, became co-owners of Camp Ouareau in 2002. She received the Ron Johnstone Award from the Canadian Camps Association in 2019 and the Association's Tribute Award. of Camps du Québec in 2009. Their daughter, Gabrielle Raill became assistant director in 2004 and then co-director since 2011. The latter received the Ron and Mickey Johnston youth leadership award from the Ontario Camps Association in 2006 and the Jack Pearse Award of Honor from the Association des Camps du Canada in 2017. She is the Canadian Ambassador for the International Camping Fellowship.

== Important events in the history of the camp ==
The significant events in the history of this holiday camp are:

- In May 1941, a forest fire located south of Lake Ouareau threatened the camp facilities and its opening for the season; finally, the camp installations are spared.
- In the 1960s, the expropriation of a southern portion of the land was used for the construction of Route 125.
- In 1976, the camp repositioned itself with the addition of the bilingual linguistic program and cultural exchanges; now, half of the campers are anglophone and the other half are francophone.
- July 17, 1982, celebration of the 60th anniversary by bringing together 250 former campers and their families.
- In August 2002, celebration of the 80th anniversary during a great reunion of the former at Camp Ouareau.
- In March 2003, the Ouareau camp received a mention of exceptional quality for its organization, the level of its services, its programs, its personnel, its infrastructures as well as its site.
- 100th anniversary of YWCA Camp Oolawhan (1917-2005), celebrated by alumni during a weekend in September 2017 at Camp Ouareau. It was an English-speaking camp exclusively for young girls, created in 1917 by the YWCA-Montreal in Sainte-Marguerite-du-Lac-Masson, in the Laurentians.
- Cancellation of the 2020 summer season due to the global Coronavirus Covid-19 pandemic.

A special committee made up of members of the permanent team and alumni of the camp is preparing the centenary celebrations of Camp Ouareau. The 100th summer season of the camp is scheduled to be celebrated in the summer of 2021 and the 100th anniversary of the camp will be in 2022.

== Toponymy ==
This summer camp is located on the shores of Lac Ouareau, hence its name. The term “Ouareau” is of Algonquin origin, meaning “far away” or “distant.” The toponym "Camp Ouareau" has been known since at least 1922; however, it has not yet been formalized at the Commission de toponymie du Québec.

Formerly, "Camp Ouareau" was confused with the "student village of Lac Ouareau" which had been established in 1948 on the southwest shore of Lac Ouareau, within the limits of Saint-Donat-de-Montcalm, near rue Notre-Dame, near the entrance to Baie Leguerrier, about one km northwest of Camp Ouareau. This student village exclusively for girls was operated by the J.É.C. (Jeunesse Étudiante Catholique) who owned the land. This student village was designated the "La Cordée Youth Center" in 1956, administered by the "Ordre de Bon Temps" (Order of Good Times). This vacation colony would have ceased to exist after February 1957.

In addition, the hamlet "Camp-Ouareau", located about one kilometer east of the camp, that is to say in the area near the end of the Leguerrier bay of Lake Ouareau, was formalized on December 5, 1968 at the Bank of names. of places of the Commission de toponymie du Québec.

== See also ==
=== Bibliography ===
- Official web site of Camp Ouareau

=== Related Articles ===
- Notre-Dame-de-la-Merci
- Lake Ouareau
- List of summer camps in the world
