= Lake Ouareau =

Lake in Quebec, Canada

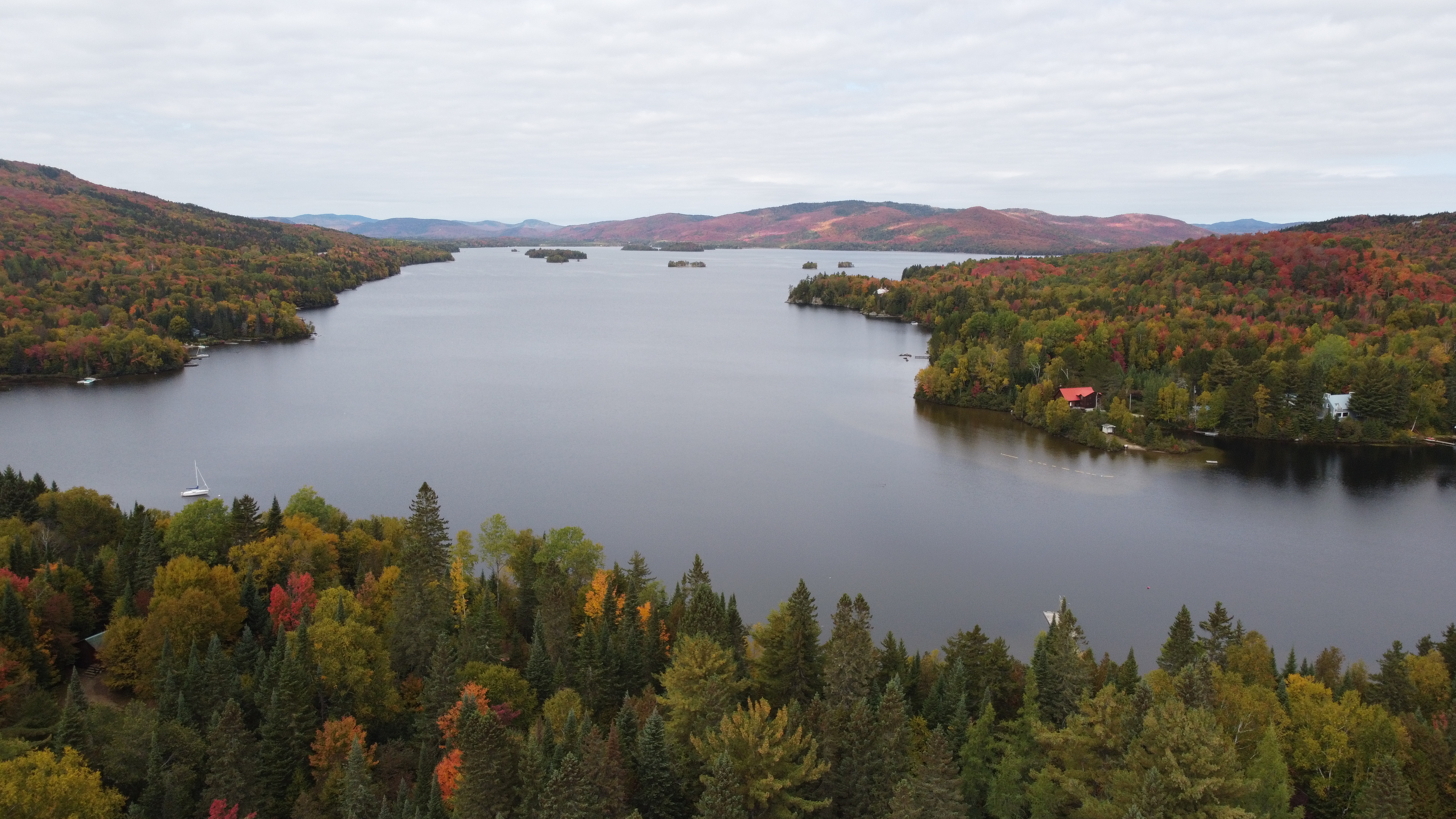
- Aerial view of Lac Ouareau from Camp Ouareau in 2020

- Location within Quebec

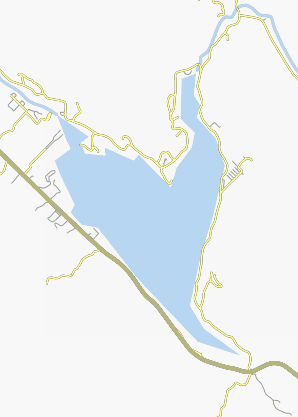
- Location: Saint-Donat / Notre-Dame-de-la-Merci, Matawinie Regional County Municipality, Quebec
- Coordinates: 46°17′03″N 74°08′34″W
- Primary inflows: Ouareau River
- Primary outflows: Ouareau River
- Basin countries: Canada
- Max. length: 13 kilometres (8.1 mi)
- Max. width: 4 kilometres (2.5 mi)
- Surface area: 14.9 square kilometres (5.8 sq mi)
- Average depth: 54 metres (177 ft)
- Surface elevation: 384 metres (1,260 ft)

Lac (Lake) Ouareau is a fairly large lake located near the town of Saint-Donat, in Matawinie Regional County Municipality, Quebec, in administrative region of Lanaudière, in the province of Quebec, Canada.

It is approximately 100 minutes by car north of downtown Montreal in the Laurentian Highlands and is located on the outskirts of Saint-Donat. Celine Dion currently owns a summer house on Lac Ouareau.

Today, Archambault and Ouareau lakes receive thousands of vacationers who enjoy the many outdoor activities available in the region.

The southwest shore of Lake Ouareau is served by the route 125 South which runs along the shore. The eastern part of the lake is served by the Saint-Guillaume path. The northern part (including the Baie de la Dame is served by the Ouareau North path. Recreational and tourist activities, notably vacationing, are the main economic activities in this area.

The surface of Lake Ouareau is generally frozen from mid-December to the end of March; safe circulation on the ice is generally done from the end of December to the beginning of March.

== Geography ==
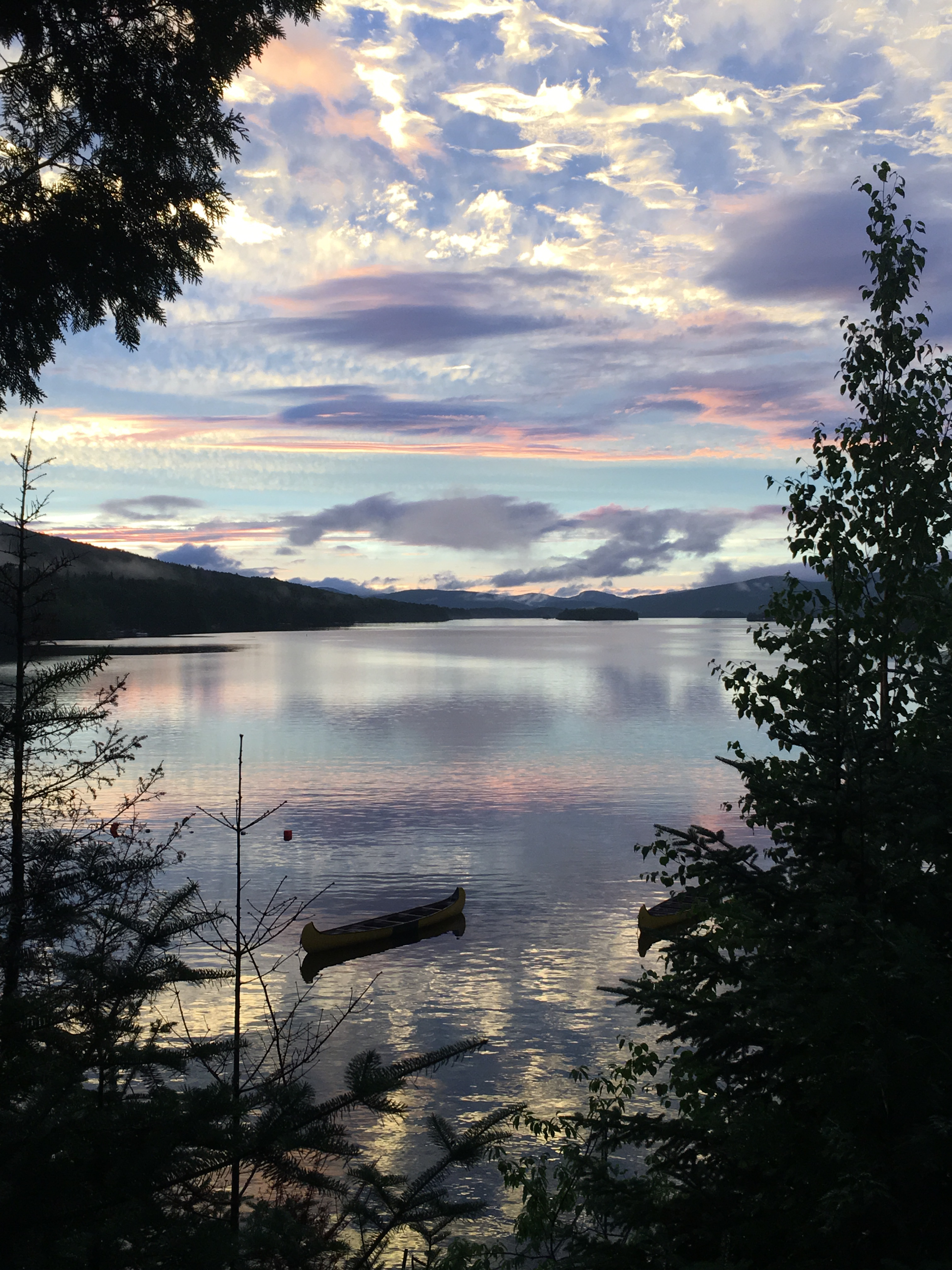
Summer sunset over Lac Ouareau, taken from the "Magic View" at Camp Ouareau

This lake is about 70 minutes from Montreal. The V-shaped lake has a length of 13 kilometres (8.1 mi), a width of 4 kilometres (2.5 mi), an area of 14.9 square kilometres (5.8 sq mi) and an average depth of 54 metres (177 ft).

Lake Ouareau includes the Baie de la Dame which sinks 3.6 kilometres (2.2 mi) on the north shore to the mouth of the lake. The entrance to the bay is 1.3 kilometres (0.81 mi) wide. The lake also includes Leguerrier Bay (length: 1.9 kilometres (1.2 mi); width at its entrance: 0.76 kilometres (0.47 mi)), located southeast of the lake. The Saint-Loup creek pours there at the bottom of the bay. The two main islands are: Cave Island (located near the southwest shore) and Rupert Island (located in the western area).

== Flora and fauna ==
The lake is home to many ideal freshwater sport fish such as largemouth bass, yellow perch, smallmouth bass, and, in some areas, muskellunge. The lake is also home to many microorganisms that have been known to thrive in very clean, or "nutritious" Northern lakes. The temperature of the water is 55 to 78 degrees Fahrenheit in the summer.

== Youth camps around the lake ==
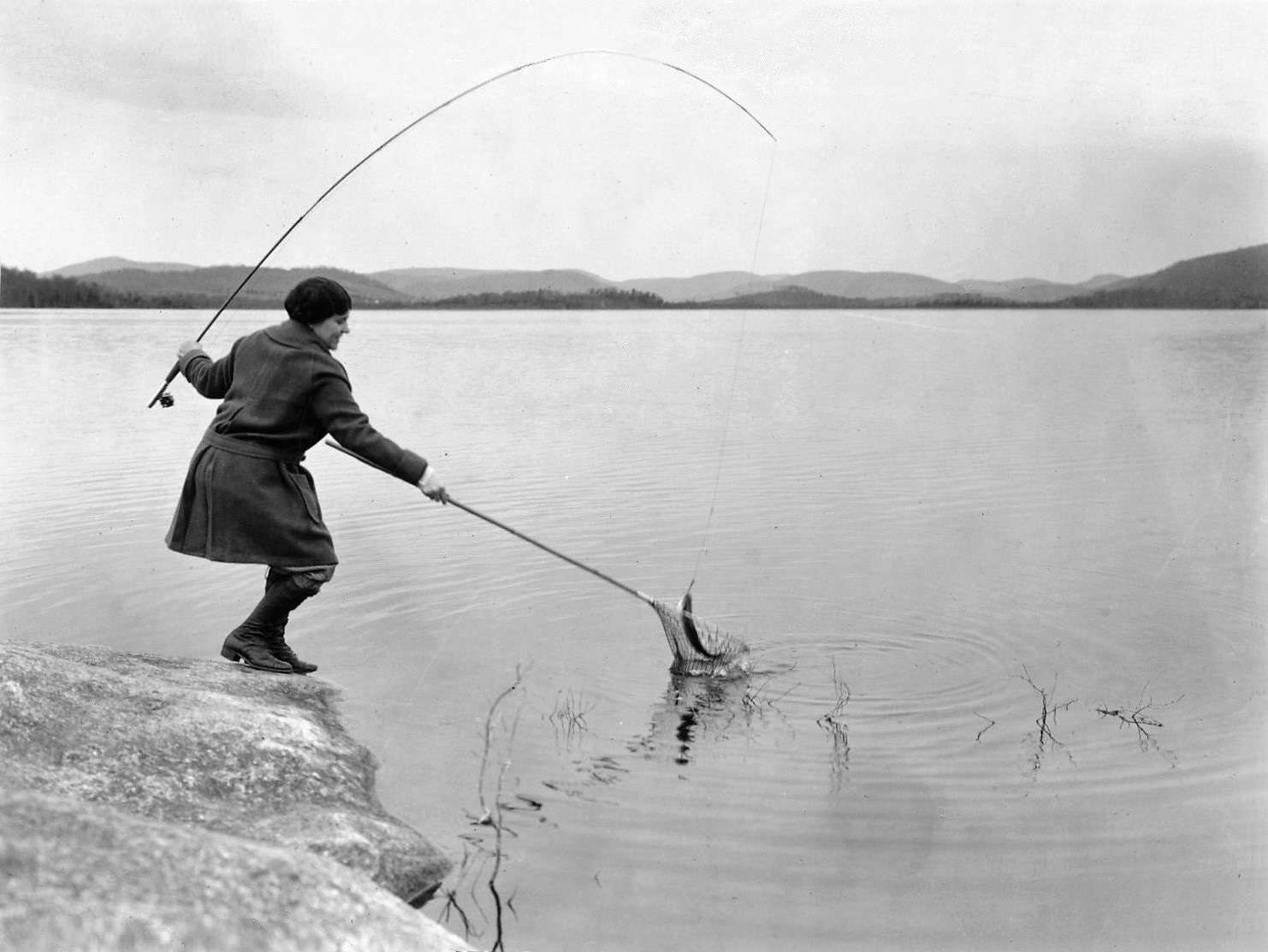
A fisherwoman and her catch at Lac Ouareau, 1925

Three summer camps were established around Lake Ouareau: Camp Ouareau (founded in 1922, for girls), the student village of Lake Ouareau (founded in 1948, for girls) and the Mother Clarac camp (founded in 1957, for boys and girls).

=== Camp Ouareau ===
An all-girls camp is located on the borders of Leguerrier Bay of lake Ouareau, hence its name, "Camp Ouareau". Camp Ouareau was established in 1922 by two women: Mabel C. Jamieson and Ferna G. Halliday. They jointly ran the camp in 1922 and 1923. Since 1924, Jamieson remained at Ouareau camp and Halliday went on to be a founder of Oconto camp, an all-girls camp, located since 1924 in Tichborne, in Ontario.

Allegedly, while Camp Ouareau & Camp Oconto are structurally & fundamentally different they are said to have similar traditions (i.e., opening & closing traditions, which are candle lit ceremonies complete with classical music & poetry).

Originally an English camp, the director at the time decided in 1976 to start accepting 50% francophone campers. Each individual age group has 50% anglophone & 50% francophone enrolment in order to ensure an exchange of the language & cultures while experiencing the different areas of camp life: activities, dining room, in cabins/tents, etc.

=== Student village of Lake Ouareau ===
The concept of student village has officially existed since 1944. Nevertheless, the site of the Student Village of Lake Ouareau was established in 1948 on land acquired from Dr. Albert Guilbault, by the J.E.C. (Jeunesse Étudiante Catholique) on the southwest shore of Lac Ouareau. The latter donated land adjacent to the camp in the summer of 1948 to build a chapel. The J.E.C. at the time, it was funding holiday study camps for young girls at this camp on Lac Ouareau and at the camp on Île aux Noix, on the Richelieu river, for young boys. The accommodation capacity of the Ouareau camp was 130 young people. According to the historical press review, the last mention of this Student Village was in September 1955. In 1956, this camp became the La Cordée Youth Center, administered by the "Ordre du Bon Temps" (Order of Good Times) which had been founded in 1946 with the aim of to promote the organization of popular leisure activities. This group organized an annual ten-day camp-school in July (in particular at the Student Village of Lac Ouareau in 1953), for young recreational leaders looking for techniques and training. At the time, as a complement, the La Cordée Youth Center operated a youth hostel in Val-Morin in winter and offered winter sports activities. The historic press does not indicate any other mention of this Youth Center after February 1957.

=== Camp Mère Clarac ===
Created in 1957 by the Sisters of Charity of Sainte-Marie, this summer camp for boys and girls covers 115 acres and can now accommodate up to 210 young people per week. The entrance to the site is located 1.1 kilometres (0.68 mi) west of Lake Ouareau, at 959 Principale Street in Saint-Donat-de-Montcalm.

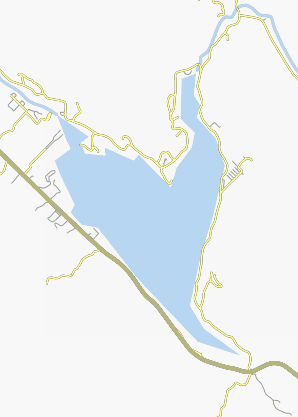
Map of lake Ouareau sector

== Forest fires ==
Two major forest fires marked the history of Lake Ouareau:

- In May 1941, a forest fire located south of Lac Ouareau reached Lac Ouareau and threatened the facilities of Camp Ouareau as well as its opening for the summer season; finally, the camp facilities are spared. Up to 300 forest rangers and volunteers fought against the brazier.
- In July 1949, the village of Saint-Donat, near Lac Ouareau, was threatened by two forest fires, one near Lac Ouareau, the other near Lac Long. More than 150 volunteer firefighters worked to dig trenches and water the brazier. Over 2,000 feet of hoses burned. On July 23, 1949, the wind turned and the forest fire climbed the mountain to the fire guard's tower, then took the direction of Notre-Dame-de-la-Merci. The Lac Ouareau Student Village was evacuated. However, no house was set on fire.

== Toponymy ==
The term "Ouareau" is of Algonquin origin meaning far or distant. This term is part of the toponym of the river and its head lake. The term Ouareau has been known since the end of the 18th century. This term appears on the plan of the surveyor William Rankins (1789) under the spelling: "The river Lac Ouareau". Joseph Bouchette also mentions this term in his Topographic Description of the Province of Lower Canada (1815). The toponym "Lake Ouareau" is also noted on the map of Francis P. Quinn, drawn up in 1858. The lake and the Ouareau river were used to transport logs by floating at the turn in the second half of the 19th and the first half from the 20th century.

The toponym Lac Ouareau was formalized on December 5, 1968.

== See also ==
- Matawinie Regional County Municipality
- Saint-Donat, une municipalité
- Notre-Dame-de-la-Merci, une municipalité
- Ouareau River, un cours d'eau
- Camp Ouareau, a summer camp
