= Sainte-Marie-Salomé =

- municipality
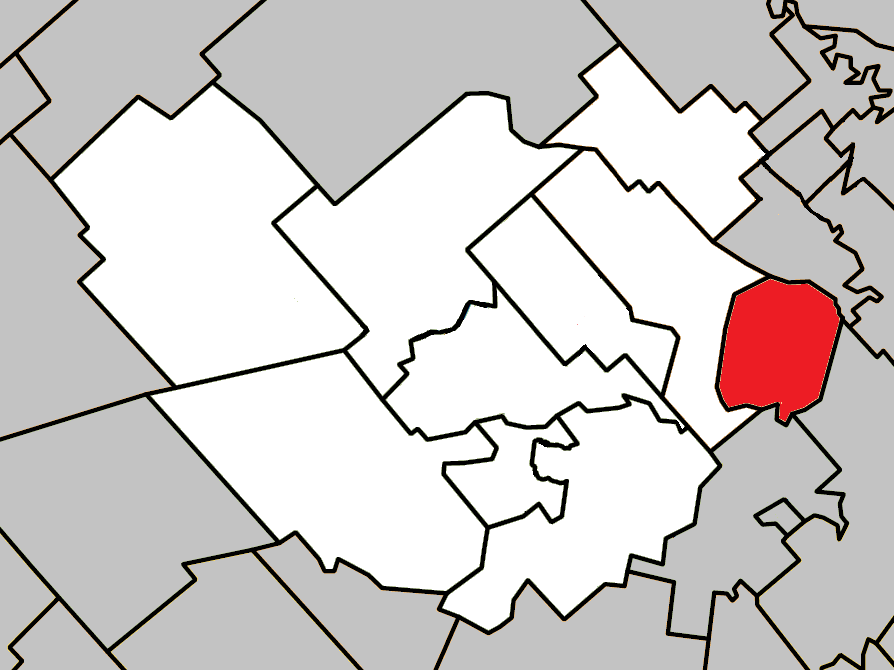
- Location within Montcalm RCM

- Location in central Quebec
- Coordinates: 45°56′N 73°30′W
- Country: Canada
- Province: Quebec
- Region: Lanaudière
- RCM: Montcalm
- Settled: 1765
- Constituted: December 27, 1888

Government
  - Mayor: Veronique Venne
  - Fed. riding: Montcalm
  - Prov. riding: Joliette

Area
  - Total: 33.55 km^{2} (12.95 sq mi)
  - Land: 33.79 km^{2} (13.05 sq mi)
- There is an apparent discrepancy between 2 authoritative sources.

Population (2021)
  - Total: 1,221
  - Density: 36.1/km^{2} (93/sq mi)
  - Pop (2016–21): ▲1.0%
- Time zone: UTC−5 (EST)
  - Summer (DST): UTC−4 (EDT)
- Postal code(s): J0K 2Z0
- Area codes: 450, 579
- Highways: No major routes
- Website: www.sainte-marie-salome.ca

Sainte-Marie-Salomé (French pronunciation: [sɛ̃t maʁi salɔme]) is a municipality in the Lanaudière region of Quebec, Canada, part of the Montcalm Regional County Municipality.

== History ==
In 1765, the first wave of colonization occurred as a result of the Great Upheaval when Acadians from Boston arrived and settled on the south bank of the Vacher Creek (French: ruisseau Vacher) in the Seignory of Saint-Sulpice. The settlement was called Bas-du-Ruisseau-Vacher (meaning "Lower Vacher Creek"), named after a certain Vacher who accompanied surveyor John Péladeau in 1767 on the seignory's territory. In 1790, the settlement grew when families from Château-Richer arrived. Actual clearing of the area began around 1820.

In March 1883, Sainte-Marie-Salomé became home to the second creamery of Quebec.

In 1888, the parish municipality of Sainte-Marie-Salomé was established by separating from Saint-Jacques-de-l'Achigan, and named after Mary Salome. Its letters patent used the misspelled "Salomée", which was not corrected until 1986. In 1889, the local post office opened. During the 1890s, the location was also known as Sainte-Marie-Salomé-de-Port-Royal, indicating the origin of its Acadian settlers.

== Demographics ==
Historical census populations – Sainte-Marie-Salomé

Year	Pop.	±%
1891	655	—
1901	704	+7.5%
1911	774	+9.9%
1921	813	+5.0%
1931	678	−16.6%
1941	759	+11.9%
1951	793	+4.5%

Year	Pop.	±%
1956	798	+0.6%
1961	820	+2.8%
1966	847	+3.3%
1971	875	+3.3%
1976	978	+11.8%
1981	1,013	+3.6%
1986	1,074	+6.0%

Year	Pop.	±%
1991	1,116	+3.9%
1996	1,189	+6.5%
2001	1,166	−1.9%
2006	1,256	+7.7%
2011	1,164	−7.3%
2016	1,209	+3.9%
2021	1,221	+1.0%

Source: Statistics Canada

Private dwellings occupied by usual residents (2021): 516 (total dwellings: 542)

Mother tongue (2021):

- English as first language: 0.8%
- French as first language: 97.1%
- English and French as first languages: 0.8%
- Other as first language: 1.2%

== Economy ==
Being in the fertile land of the St. Lawrence Lowlands, agriculture is the most important economic function of the municipality.

== Government ==
List of former mayors:

- Azarie Mireault (1889–1892)
- Misaël Duprat (1892–1898)
- Lucien Martin (1898–1903; 1906–1927)
- Ludger Brien (1903–1906)
- Gustave Richard (1927–1935)
- Joseph Melançon (1935–1939)
- Antonio Johnson (1939–1951)
- Joseph Narcisse Benoni Arthur Dalpé (1951–1953)
- Marc Brien (1953–1955; 1959–1961)
- Roger Bourgeois (1955–1959)
- Wellie Granger (1961–1967)
- Jean Guy Melançon (1967–1974; 1983–1994)
- André Bourgeois (1974–1977; 1980–1983)
- Joseph Yves Guillaume Bernard Dalpé (1977–1980)
- Maurice Richard (1994–2013)
- Véronique Venne (2013–present)

== Education ==
Commission scolaire des Samares operates francophone public schools, including:

- École de Sainte-Marie-Salomé

The Sir Wilfrid Laurier School Board operates anglophone public schools, including:

- Joliette Elementary School in Saint-Charles-Borromée
- Joliette High School in Joliette
