= Sainte-Julienne =

- Municipality
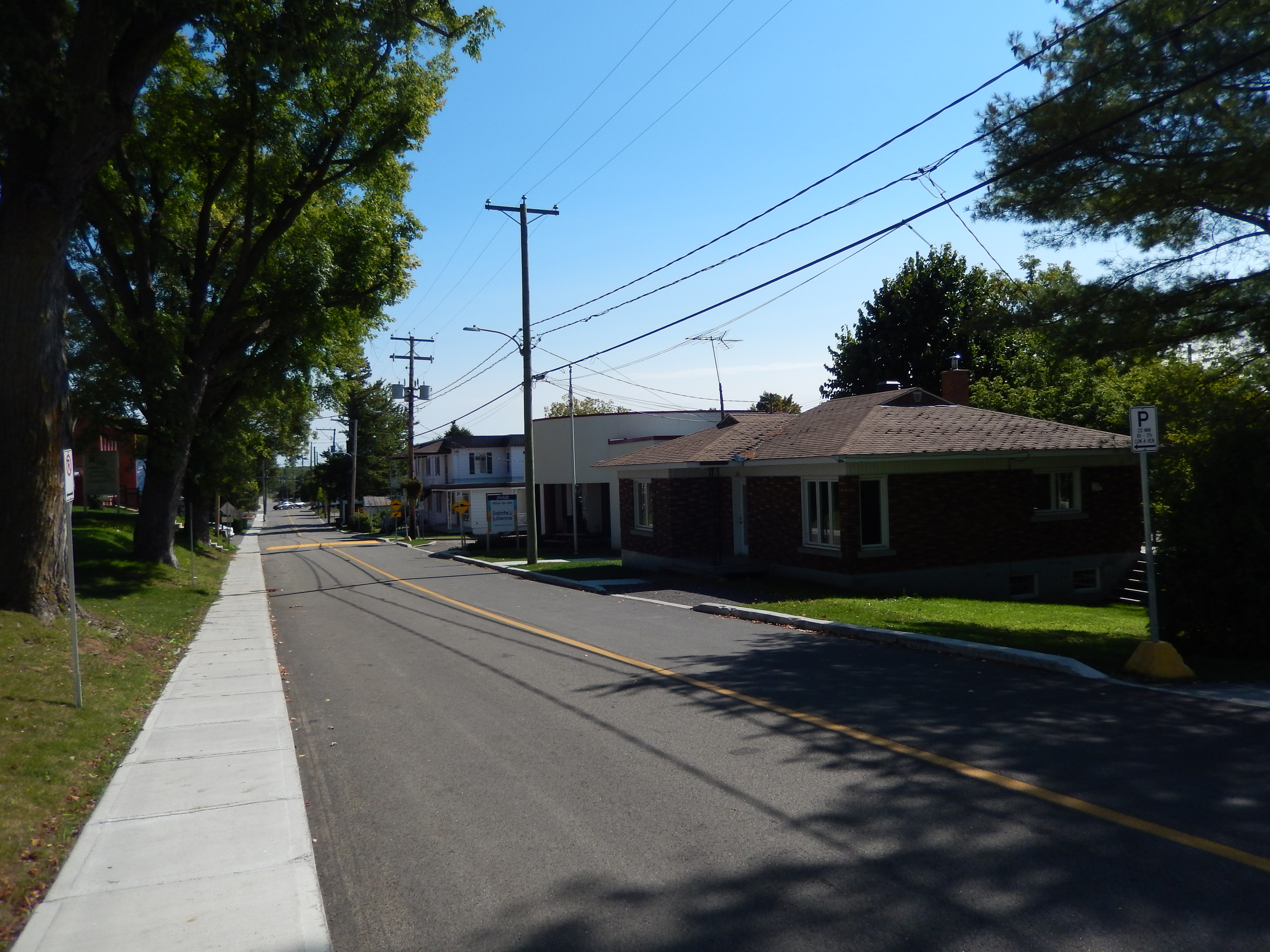
- rue Victoria

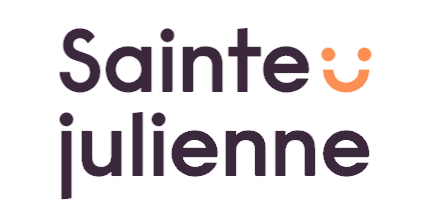
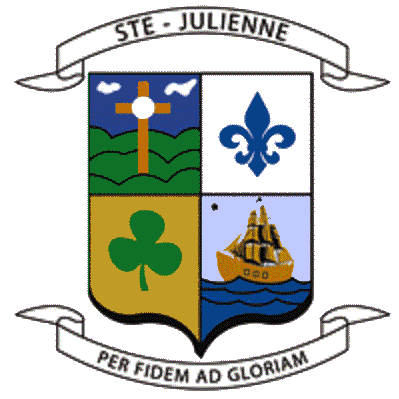
- Flag Coat of arms

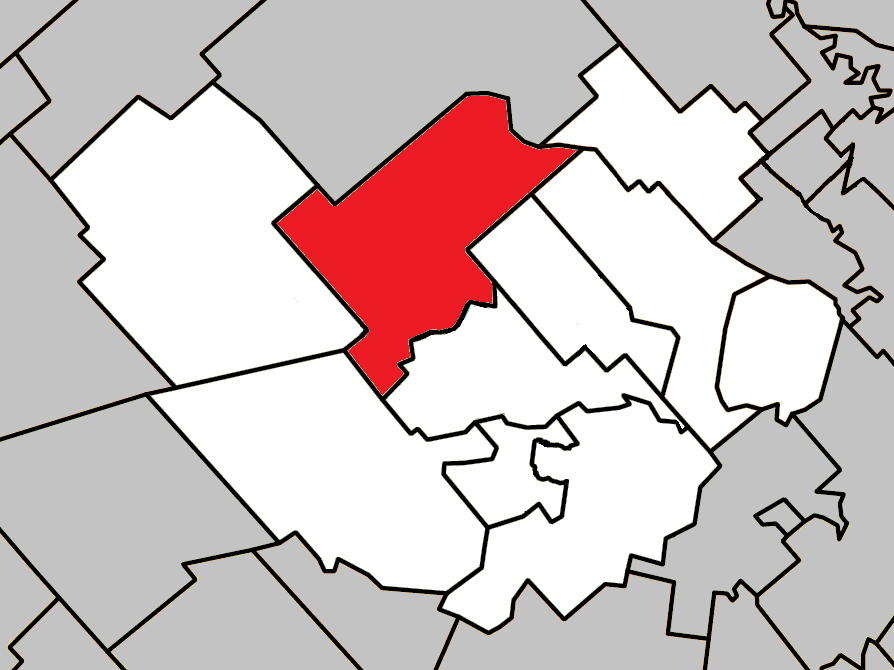
- Location within Montcalm RCM

- Location in central Quebec
- Coordinates: 45°58′N 73°43′W
- Country: Canada
- Province: Quebec
- Region: Lanaudière
- RCM: Montcalm
- Settled: 1840
- Constituted: July 1, 1855

Government
  - Mayor: Jean-Pierre Charron
  - Fed. riding: Montcalm
  - Prov. riding: Rousseau

Area
  - Municipality: 100.36 km^{2} (38.75 sq mi)
  - Land: 99.42 km^{2} (38.39 sq mi)
  - Urban: 6.49 km^{2} (2.51 sq mi)

Population (2021)
  - Municipality: 11,173
  - Density: 112.4/km^{2} (291/sq mi)
  - Urban: 3,469
  - Urban density: 534.2/km^{2} (1,384/sq mi)
  - Pop (2016–21): ▲12.3%
- Time zone: UTC−05:00 (EST)
  - Summer (DST): UTC−04:00 (EDT)
- Postal code(s): J0K 2T0
- Area codes: 450, 579
- Highways: R-125; R-337; R-346
- Website: www.sainte-julienne.com

Sainte-Julienne (French pronunciation: [sɛ̃t ʒyljɛn]) is a community and municipality in Lanaudière, Quebec, Canada. It is the seat of the Montcalm Regional County Municipality. According to the 2021 Canadian census, the community has a population of 11,173. It is home to the now-closed Sainte-Julienne Aerodrome.

== History ==
Around 1840, the first settlers arrived from Lachenaie, Saint-Sulpice, and Saint-Jacques-de-l'Achigan. The place was known as Village Beaupré until 1870, after Joseph-Édouard Beaupré (1817-1880), who built the first sawmill on the site and donated the land for the construction of the chapel. In 1848, the parish of Sainte-Julienne-de-Rawdon was created, named in honour of Juliana Falconieri, while Rawdon refers to its location within the geographic township of Rawdon. In 1853, its post office opened.

In 1855, the Parish Municipality of Sainte-Julienne-de-Rawdon was established, with Joseph-Édouard Beaupré as first mayor.

In 1910, telephone service was installed, followed by electricity in the village centre in 1913.

In 1967, the municipal name was shortened to just Sainte-Julienne, and in 1998, its status changed from parish municipality to (regular) municipality.

== Demographics ==
In the 2021 Census of Population conducted by Statistics Canada, Sainte-Julienne had a population of 11,173 living in 4,573 of its 4,930 total private dwellings, a change of 12.3% from its 2016 population of 9,953. With a land area of 99.42 km^{2} (38.39 sq mi), it had a population density of 112.4/km^{2} (291.1/sq mi) in 2021.

Historical census populations – Sainte-Julienne

Year	Pop.	±%
1861	1,399	—
1871	1,117	−20.2%
1881	1,132	+1.3%
1891	1,150	+1.6%
1901	1,289	+12.1%
1911	1,265	−1.9%
1921	1,302	+2.9%
1931	1,132	−13.1%

Year	Pop.	±%
1941	1,274	+12.5%
1951	1,713	+34.5%
1956	1,837	+7.2%
1961	1,881	+2.4%
1966	2,042	+8.6%
1971	2,732	+33.8%
1976	3,582	+31.1%
1981	4,667	+30.3%

Year	Pop.	±%
1986	4,972	+6.5%
1991	6,092	+22.5%
1996	6,778	+11.3%
2001	7,182	+6.0%
2006	7,983	+11.2%
2011	9,331	+16.9%
2016	9,953	+6.7%
2021	11,173	+12.3%

Source: Statistics Canada

== Education ==
Commission scolaire des Samares operates Francophone public schools:

- École secondaire de Sainte-Julienne
- École de Sainte-Julienne
  - pavillon des Boutons-d'Or
  - pavillon des Explorateurs
  - pavillon Notre-Dame-de-Fatima
  - pavillon des Virevents

Sir Wilfrid Laurier School Board operates Anglophone public schools:

- Rawdon Elementary School in Rawdon
- Joliette High School in Joliette

== Notable people ==
- Audrey De Montigny - former Canadian Idol finalist.
- Zotique Mageau (1865-1951) - Member of Provincial Parliament of Ontario

== See also ==
- List of municipalities created in Quebec in 1855
