= Crabtree, Quebec =

Crabtree
- City
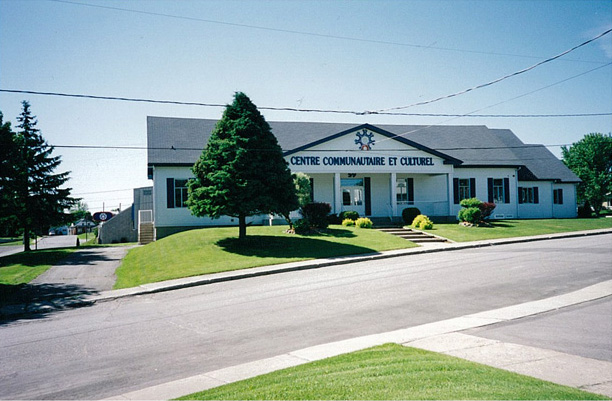
- Municipal library and community centre

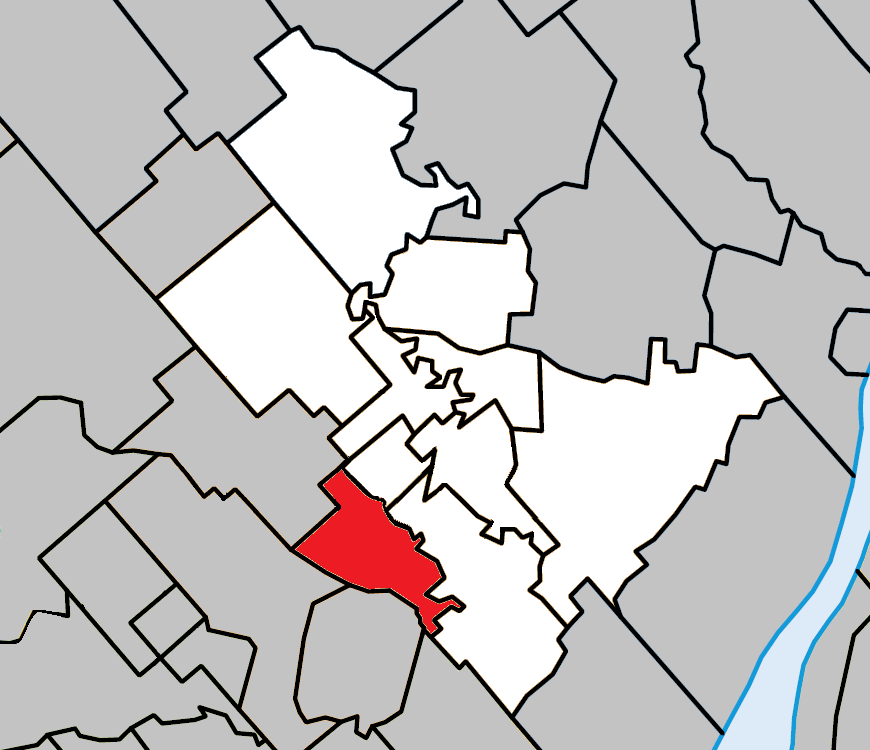
- Location within Joliette RCM.

- Location in central Quebec.
- Coordinates: 45°58′N 73°28′W
- Country: Canada
- Province: Quebec
- Region: Lanaudière
- RCM: Joliette
- Settled: 1790s
- Constituted: October 23, 1996

Government
  - Mayor: Mario LaSalle
  - Federal riding: Joliette
  - Prov. riding: Joliette

Area
  - Total: 26.10 km^{2} (10.08 sq mi)
  - Land: 25.06 km^{2} (9.68 sq mi)

Population (2021)
  - Total: 4,155
  - Density: 165.8/km^{2} (429/sq mi)
  - Pop 2016-2021: ▲5%
  - Dwellings: 1,826
- Time zone: UTC−5 (EST)
  - Summer (DST): UTC−4 (EDT)
- Postal code(s): J0K 1B0
- Area codes: 450 and 579
- Highways: R-158
- Website: www.municipalite crabtree.qc.ca

Crabtree is a city in the Lanaudière region of Quebec, Canada, part of the Joliette Regional County Municipality. It is located along the Ouareau River, a right tributary of the L'Assomption River.

The most interesting local attraction is the Trou de Fée (lit. "Fairy Hole"), a cave on the west bank of the Ouareau River.

== History ==
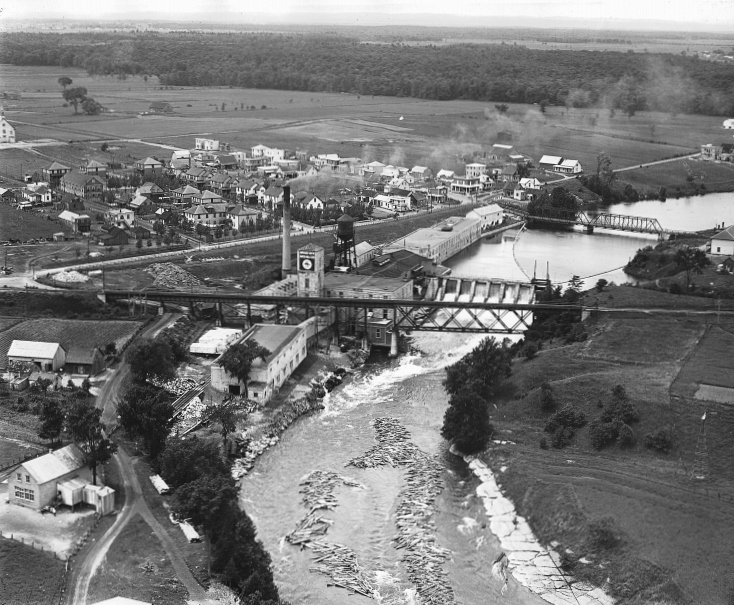
Sacré-Cœur-de-Jésus circa 1925

The area began to be populated at the end of the 18th century. In 1845, the first saw mills were built along the Ouareau River, but didn't survive for long as they were washed away by spring floods.

The real impetus for the town's development came in 1905 when Edwin Crabtree bought land in what would become the centre of the city to build a paper mill. He founded the Edwin Crabtree and Sons Ltd. and built the mill also along the Ouareau River to take advantage of its hydraulic power. A year later, the post office opened under the name "Crabtree Mills".

In 1912, the mill was destroyed by fire, but was rebuilt within a year. Gradually a small village grew near the mill, including the so-called "English Street" (la rue des Anglais) with its residences for the managers, boarding house, the entertainment hall "Beaver S Club", tennis court and park. A dam on the Ouareau River was built in 1917-18. Edwin Crabtree and Sons Ltd. joined the Howard Smith Paper Mills group (subsequently bought by Domtar), and the plant was modernized. Today Kruger Products operates the mill.

In 1921, the Parish of Sacré-Cœur-de-Jésus was formed, and on December 27 of that year, it was also civilly incorporated as the Parish Municipality of Sacré-Cœur-de-Jésus. Kay Crabtree was the first mayor. On July 1, 1922, the School Commission of the Parish of Sacré-Cœur-de-Jésus-de-Crabtree was established. On March 9, 1930, the mill workers formed the Syndicat National des Travailleurs de la Pulpe et du Papier ("National Union of Pulp and Paper Workers"), one of the oldest unions affiliated with the paper and forestry sector of the Confederation of National Labour Unions.

For a long time the place was also identified with the extended name Sacré-Cœur-de-Jésus-de-Crabtree-Mills. In 1945, the village itself separated from the parish municipality and was incorporated as the Municipality of Crabtree. In 1991, Sacré-Cœur-de-Jésus was renamed to Sacré-Cœur-de-Crabtree to avoid confusion with a municipality in the Beauce by the same name. On October 23, 1996, both places were merged into the new Municipality of Crabtree and, on November 18, 2023, the status of the municipality changed to become the City of Crabtree.

== Demographics ==
In the 2021 Census of Population conducted by Statistics Canada, Crabtree had a population of 4,155 living in 1,757 of its 1,826 total private dwellings, a change of 5% from its 2016 population of 3,958. With a land area of 25.06 km^{2} (9.68 sq mi), it had a population density of 165.8/km^{2} (429.4/sq mi) in 2021.

Historical Population

Historical population
Year	Pop.	±%
1951	983	—
1956	1,103	+12.2%
1961	1,313	+19.0%
1966	1,509	+14.9%
1971	1,706	+13.1%
1976	1,942	+13.8%
1981	1,950	+0.4%
1986	1,979	+1.5%
1991	2,157	+9.0%
1996	2,339	+8.4%
2001	3,330	+42.4%
2006	3,441	+3.3%
2011	3,887	+13.0%
2016	3,958	+1.8%
2021	4,155	+5.0%

Private dwellings occupied by usual residents: 1,757 (total dwellings: 1,826)

Mother tongue:

- English as first language: 1%
- French as first language: 96,9%
- English and French as first language: 0.4%
- Other as first language: 1.3%

== Education ==
Commission scolaire des Samares operates francophone public schools, including:

- École Sacré-Coeur-de-Jésus

The Sir Wilfrid Laurier School Board operates anglophone public schools, including:

- Joliette Elementary School in Saint-Charles-Borromée
- Joliette High School in Joliette

== See also ==
- List of cities in Quebec
