= Saint-Liguori =

- Municipality
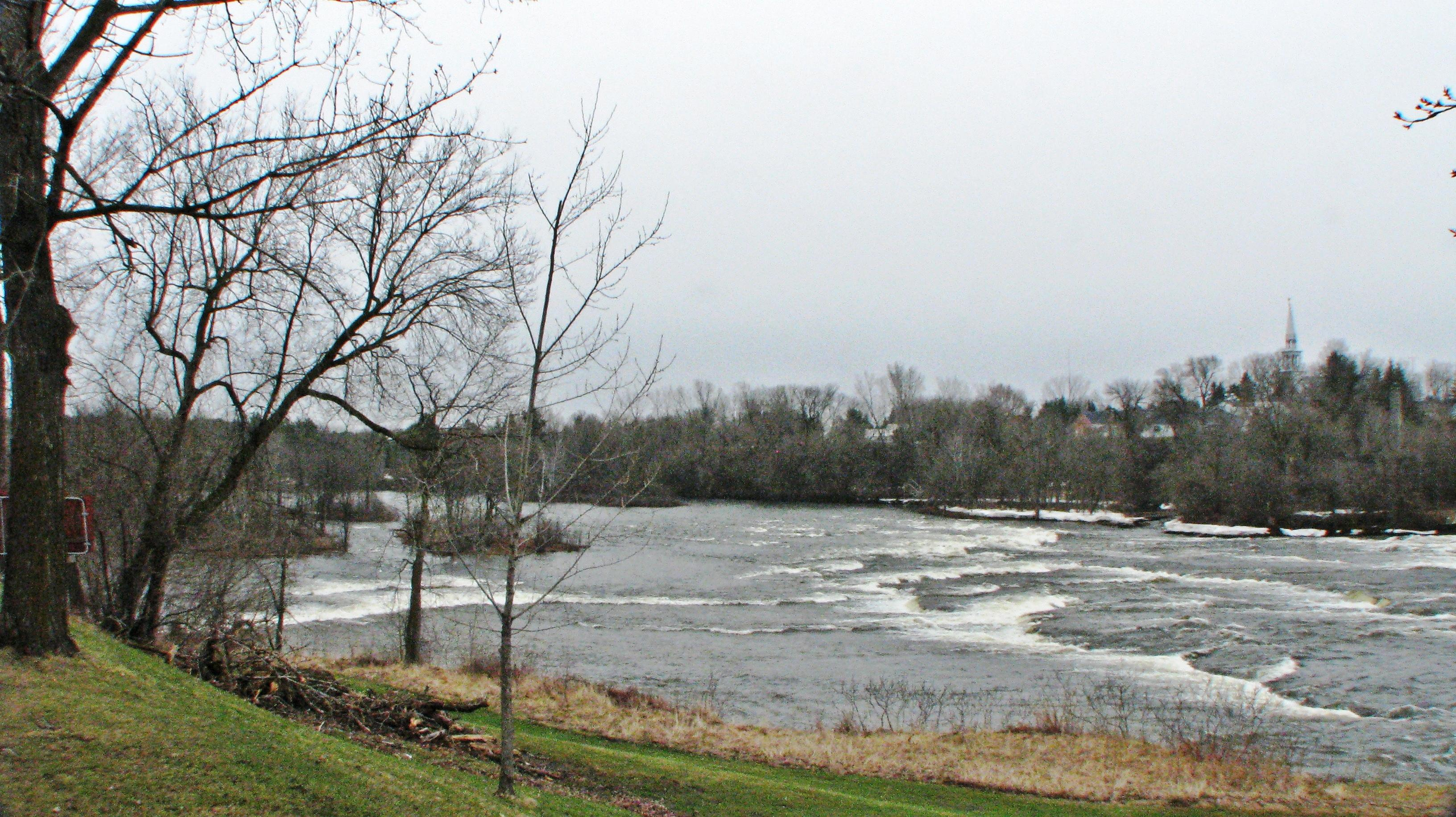
- Ouareau River

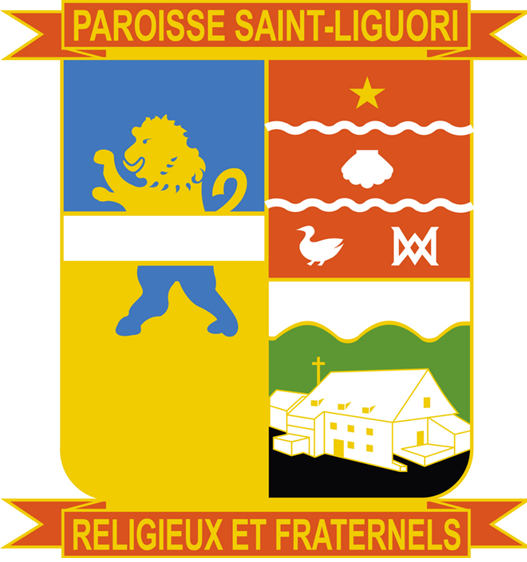
- Coat of arms

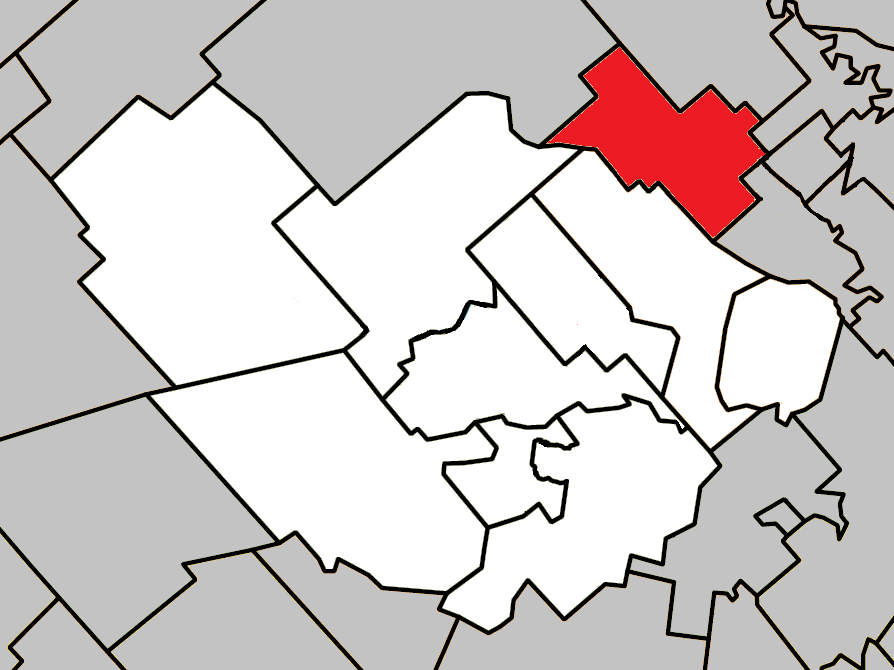
- Location within Montcalm RCM

- Location in central Quebec
- Coordinates: 46°01′N 73°34′W
- Country: Canada
- Province: Quebec
- Region: Lanaudière
- RCM: Montcalm
- Settled: 1794
- Constituted: July 1, 1855

Government
  - Mayor: Ghislaine Pomerleau
  - Fed. riding: Montcalm
  - Prov. riding: Joliette

Area
  - Total: 51.77 km^{2} (19.99 sq mi)
  - Land: 50.88 km^{2} (19.64 sq mi)

Population (2021)
  - Total: 2,066
  - Density: 40.6/km^{2} (105/sq mi)
  - Pop (2016–21): ▲6.3%
- Time zone: UTC−5 (EST)
  - Summer (DST): UTC−4 (EDT)
- Postal code(s): J0K 2X0
- Area codes: 450, 579
- Highways: R-341 R-346

Saint-Liguori (French pronunciation: [sɛ̃ liɡɔʁi]) is a municipality in the Montcalm Regional County Municipality in the Lanaudière region of Quebec, Canada.

== History ==
Around 1794, the area began to be settled by people from Acadia and Ireland, and the place became known as Lacouareau, from the Algonquin word naguaro, meaning "far away" or "distant". In 1850, the parish of Saint-Liguori was created, named in honour of Alphonsus Liguori. In 1854, its post office opened, and the following year, the Parish Municipality of Saint-Alphonse-de-Liguori was formed.

In 1961, the municipal name was shortened to Saint-Liguori, and in 2017, its status changed from parish municipality to (regular) municipality.

== Demographics ==
Historical census populations – Saint-Liguori

Year	Pop.	±%
1861	1,523	—
1871	1,485	−2.5%
1881	1,295	−12.8%
1891	1,170	−9.7%
1901	1,242	+6.2%
1911	1,190	−4.2%
1921	1,112	−6.6%
1931	1,026	−7.7%

Year	Pop.	±%
1941	1,092	+6.4%
1951	1,075	−1.6%
1956	1,117	+3.9%
1961	1,084	−3.0%
1966	1,035	−4.5%
1971	1,049	+1.4%
1976	1,082	+3.1%
1981	1,255	+16.0%

Year	Pop.	±%
1986	1,386	+10.4%
1991	1,506	+8.7%
1996	1,730	+14.9%
2001	1,793	+3.6%
2006	1,887	+5.2%
2011	1,976	+4.7%
2016	1,943	−1.7%
2021	2,066	+6.3%

Source: Statistics Canada

Private dwellings occupied by usual residents (2021): 856 (total dwellings: 901)

Mother tongue (2021):

- English as first language: 1.0%
- French as first language: 97.3%
- English and French as first languages: 0.5%
- Other as first language: 0.7%

== Government ==
List of former mayors:

- Jean Baptiste Leblanc (1855–1860)
- Firmin Dugas (1860–1862)
- Théophile Breault (1862–1864)
- Louis Chartier dit Robert (1864–1866)
- Urgel Grenier (1866–1868)
- Stanislas Laporte (1868–1870)
- Cyrille Ayotte (1870–1872)
- Pierre Guibord (1872–1875)
- Simon Richard (1875–1887, 1890–1894)
- Joseph Ratelle (1887–1888)
- David Lapointe (1888–1890)
- Joseph Laporte (1894–1904)
- Napoléon Rivest (1904–1905)
- Alcide Richard (1905–1908)
- Théophile Lapointe (1908–1910)
- Louis Dubas (1910–1918)
- Rémy Neveu (1918–1921)
- Joseph Perreault (1921–1925)
- Ladislas Lachapelle (1925–1927)
- Émery Gaudet (1927–1929)
- Adonias Lapointe (1929–1933)
- Joseph (Placide) Gaudet (1933–1935)
- Hormidas Picard (1935–1937)
- Dominas Sourdif (1937–1947)
- Arthur Lachapelle (1947–1948)
- Amédée Rivest (1948–1949)
- Athanase Laporte (1949–1953)
- Joseph Rivest (1953–1956)
- Joseph (Émery) Gaudet (1956–1961)
- Raoul Larivière (1961–1971)
- Armand Marchand (1971–1978)
- Réal Desmarais (1978–1980)
- Lucien Rivest (1980–1989)
- Roger Gaudet (1989–2003)
- Serge Rivest (2003–2013)
- Ghislaine Pomerleau (2013–present)

== Education ==
Commission scolaire des Samares operates francophone public schools, including:

- École Saint-Joseph

The Sir Wilfrid Laurier School Board operates anglophone public schools, including:

- Joliette Elementary School in Saint-Charles-Borromée
- Joliette High School in Joliette
