= Montcalm Regional County Municipality =

Montcalm
- Regional county municipality
- Coordinates: 45°54′N 73°40′W
- Country: Canada
- Province: Quebec
- Region: Lanaudière
- Effective: January 1, 1982
- County seat: Sainte-Julienne

Government
  - Type: Prefecture
  - Prefect: Patrick Massé

Area
  - Total: 716.30 km^{2} (276.56 sq mi)
  - Land: 709.58 km^{2} (273.97 sq mi)

Population (2021)
  - Total: 58,680
  - Density: 82.7/km^{2} (214/sq mi)
  - Change 2016–2021: ▲11.6%
  - Dwellings: 25,557
- Time zone: UTC−5 (EST)
  - Summer (DST): UTC−4 (EDT)
- Area codes: 450 and 579
- Website: www.mrcmontcalm.com

Montcalm (French pronunciation: [mɔ̃kalm]) is a regional county municipality, or RCM, in the Lanaudière region of Quebec, Canada. Its seat is Sainte-Julienne, and at the time of the 2021 Canadian Census its population was 58,680

== Subdivisions ==
There are 10 subdivisions within the RCM:

Cities & Towns (1)	Municipalities (9)
Saint-Lin–Laurentides	Saint-Alexis
	Saint-Calixte
	Saint-Esprit
	Saint-Jacques
	Sainte-Julienne
	Saint-Liguori
	Sainte-Marie-Salomé
	Saint-Roch-de-l'Achigan
	Saint-Roch-Ouest

== Transportation ==
=== Access Routes ===
Highways and numbered routes that run through the municipality, including external routes that start or finish at the county border:

- Autoroutes
  - A-25
- Principal Highways
  - R-125
  - R-158
- Secondary Highways
  - R-335
  - R-337
  - R-339
  - R-341
  - R-346
- External Routes
  - None

== See also ==
- List of regional county municipalities and equivalent territories in Quebec
