= Chertsey, Quebec =

Chertsey
- Municipality
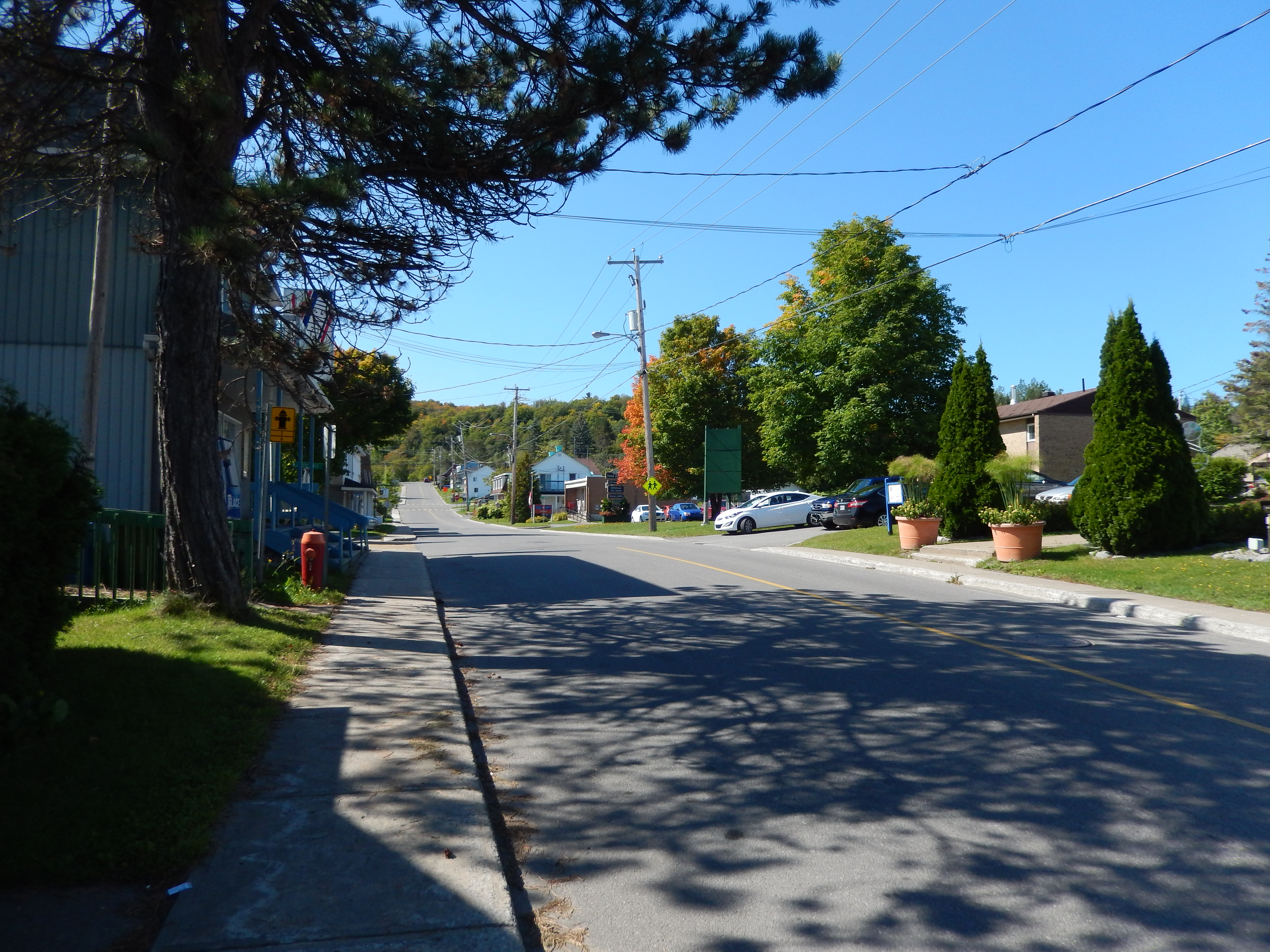
- rue de l'Église in Chertsey

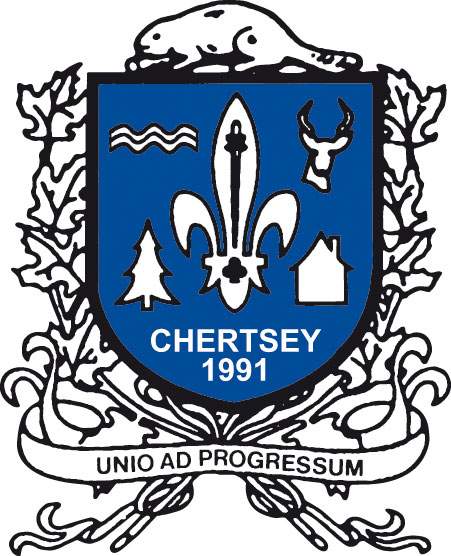
- Coat of arms

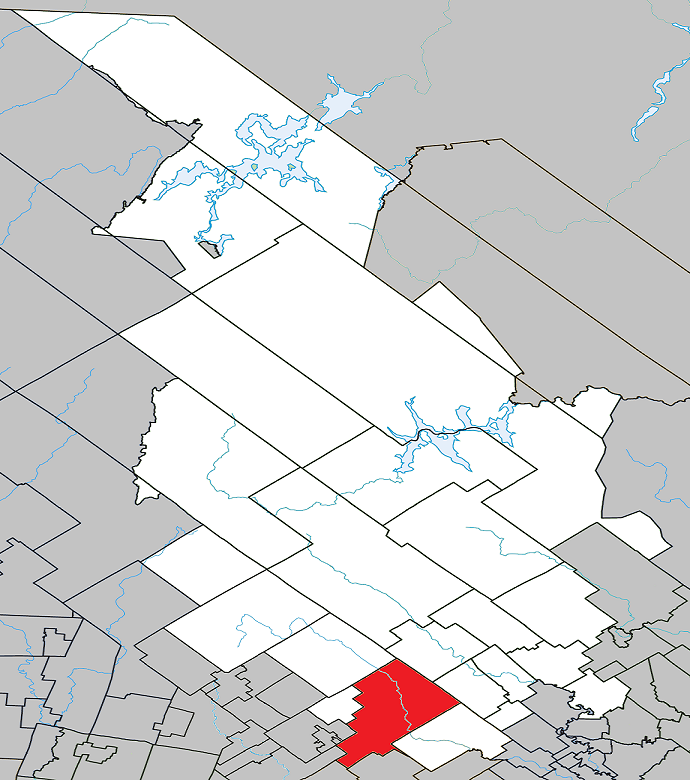
- Location within Matawinie RCM

- Location in central Quebec
- Coordinates: 46°10′N 73°55′W
- Country: Canada
- Province: Quebec
- Region: Lanaudière
- RCM: Matawinie
- Settled: 1849
- Constituted: November 13, 1991

Government
  - Mayor: Michelle Joly
  - Fed. riding: Les Pays-d'en-Haut
  - Prov. riding: Bertrand

Area
  - Total: 302.13 km^{2} (116.65 sq mi)
  - Land: 286.05 km^{2} (110.44 sq mi)

Population (2021)
  - Total: 5,295
  - Density: 18.5/km^{2} (48/sq mi)
  - Change 2016-21: ▲12.8%
  - Dwellings: 4,255
- Time zone: UTC−5 (EST)
  - Summer (DST): UTC−4 (EDT)
- Postal code(s): J0K 3K0
- Area codes: 450, 579
- Highways: R-125 R-335
- Website: chertsey.ca

Chertsey is a municipality in the regional county municipality of Matawinie in Quebec, Canada, located in the administrative region of Lanaudière.

The diocesan shrine Mary Queen of Hearts (Marie-Reine-des-Coeurs) is in Chertsey.

Lake Beaulac, the lake with the highest elevation in Lanaudière, was annexed by the municipality in 1991.

== History ==
=== Before Chertsey ===
When the first Europeans arrived in the St. Lawrence Valley, the Chertsey area was inhabited by Algonquin Amerindians, who hunted and fished there. After the conquest, the population of the St. Lawrence valley grew rapidly and the lands closest to Montreal, such as Chertsey, began to be exploited for their timber. It is likely that Indians, Métis and squatters began settling and clearing plots of land in Chertsey from 1820 onwards. The first settlers came from Rawdon, most of them Irish. As early as 1843, a logging road, the Dorwin Road, left Rawdon and ran along the east bank of the Ouareau River, crossing the entire township of Chertsey as far north as Notre-Dame-de-la-Merci.

=== Settlement ===
In 1848, the parish priest Jean-Romuald Paré of Saint-Jacques-de-Saint-Sulpice founded the Société des Défricheurs with local notables to develop the township of Chertsey by encouraging Catholic and French-speaking settlers. Surveys and the allocation of lots began in 1849, and many settlers of Acadian origin from Saint-Jacques-de-Saint-Sulpice moved in. In 1850, the first chapel, Notre-Dame-de-Bon-Secours, was built in the 3rd Range. The municipal corporation of the Township of Chertsey was created on January 1, 1856. Sawmills and flour mills were built on the Jean-Venne and Burton rivers and at the outlet of Lac Jaune in 1850, and were essential to the settlement.

The government, advised by the Société des Défricheurs, decided to establish the village centre on the 5th row around the Jean-Venne River. A new church with an adjacent presbytery and cemetery was built in 1859 on Government Road (near Irène Road today). There was also a general shop and post office, a blacksmith shop, a school, several farms, and 2 mills in the village. Most of the settlers, however, settled in the first rows to the south of the township, and the chapel on the 3rd row was better situated for them.

They therefore petitioned to have their ruined chapel rebuilt as a parish church. In 1869, a new church was built near the old chapel, the current church, and the Lafontaine Village church was completely dismantled. The bishop's decision was not well received by some residents of Lafontaine Village, some of whom went so far as to become Protestants! Village Lafontaine was gradually abandoned, and some houses were dismantled and rebuilt elsewhere.

=== Foundation ===
The first official census in 1851 counted 413 inhabitants. The population grew rapidly: 919 in 1861, 1970 in 1871. The first concern was to improve the roads, as the settlement was very scattered (the canton was 10 square miles) and as everyone had to maintain their own stretch of road, coordination was difficult. Little by little, the area became organised and transformed. The forest was cleared, and the inhabitants, who were initially very dependent on the forestry industry, gradually experienced relative prosperity thanks to agriculture and livestock farming until around 1900.

In 1856, when the municipality of Chertsey was officially founded, municipal administration was a novelty in Canada. The main difficulty was finding citizens who were educated enough to manage a municipality. For some fifteen years, the municipal council was very unstable, with one councillor succeeding another every year, and we were content with maintaining the roads. In March 1863, the first major vote was held to provide $500 in assistance to certain families affected by famine (poor harvest in 1862). In 1873, the better-organised council decided to maintain the main roads in winter. In 1890, the first council house was built.

A new presbytery was built in 1867 and a new church in 1869. A.H. Coutu, the parish priest at the time, was a builder who continued the work of parish priest Paré. He developed his parish and opened a road to Saint-Donat, which he founded with his brothers. With the growing prosperity of the parish, the church was completed. On 14 January 1897, the architect Dostaler from Joliette completed the work and a grand celebration was held, as reported in La Presse on 19 January 1897: "The church of Chertsey, with its remarkable altar, the dimensions of its nave, the rich sculptures of its pulpit and the imposing majesty of its pilasters, can rightly be counted among the most beautiful in the Laurentians." Since 2013, the church has been transformed into a cultural centre while retaining its religious vocation: ‘La Belle Église’.

=== Lac-Paré ===
In 1949, the Lac-Paré sector split off to became its own separate parish municipality. Lac-Paré existed for about 40 years until the Parish Municipality of Lac-Paré and the Township Municipality of Chertsey merged, in 1991, to create the current municipality.

== Demographics ==
=== Population ===
In the 2021 Census of Population conducted by Statistics Canada, Chertsey had a population of 5,295 living in 2,720 of its 4,255 total private dwellings, a change of 12.8% from its 2016 population of 4,696. With a land area of 286.05 km^{2} (110.44 sq mi), it had a population density of 18.5/km^{2} (47.9/sq mi) in 2021.

Historical census populations – Chertsey, Quebec
Year	Pop.	±%
1996	3,853	—
2001	4,112	+6.7%
2006	5,006	+21.7%
2011	4,836	−3.4%
2016	4,696	−2.9%
2021	5,295	+12.8%
Source: Statistics Canada

Private dwellings occupied by usual residents (2021): 2,720 (total dwellings: 4,255)

=== Language ===
Mother tongue (2021):

Language	Population	Pct (%)
French only	4,900	92.6%
English only	165	3.1%
English and French	95	1.8%
Ukrainian	115	2.2%

== Government ==
List of former mayors of Chertsey Township:

- Cyrille Morin (1856-1858, 1862-1863)
- Sifroy-David Provost (1858-1860)
- Marc Granger (1860-1862)
- Delphin Morin (1863, 1868-1870, 1874)
- Thomas Holtby (1864-1866, 1870-1871)
- Jean-Élie Breault (1866-1867)
- Jules Breault (1867-1868)
- Marcel Lépine (1871-1873, 1874-1877)
- Joseph Sylvestre (1874)
- Édouard Carroll (1877-1878)
- Joseph Varin (1878-1884, 1886-1892)
- Joseph Lajeunesse (1884-1886)
- Olivier Lapierre (1892-1909)
- Ludger Beauregard (1909-1911)
- Émile Perreault (1911-1914)
- Joseph Beauregard (1914-1923)
- Gaspard Dupuis (1923-1933, 1936-1941)
- Léon Archambault (1933-1936)
- Émery Poudrier (1941-1947)
- Léo (Emmanuel-Théodore) Dupuis (1947-1953)
- Hildège Bélair (1953-1961)
- Edmond-Jean Riopel (1961-1965)
- Yves Rochon (1965-1967)
- Paul (Léopold) Lussier (1967-1970)
- Lucien-Réal Dufour (1970-1972)
- Gérard Miron (1972-1981)
- Bernard Martin (1981-1984)
- Guy Leclerc (1984-1991)

List of former mayors of Chertsey Municipality:

- Guy Leclerc (1991-1994)
- Daniel Brazeau (1994-2005)
- Yves Lafortune (2005-2008)
- Jocelyn Gravel (2008-2013)
- Michel Surprenant (2013-2017)
- François Quenneville (2017–2021)
- Michelle Joly (2021–present)

== Education ==
Centre de services scolaire des Samares operates Francophone public schools:

- École de Saint-Théodore-de-Chertsey

Sir Wilfrid Laurier School Board operates Anglophone public schools:

- Rawdon Elementary School in Rawdon
- Joliette High School in Joliette

== See also ==
- List of municipalities in Quebec
