= Notre-Dame-de-la-Merci =

- Municipality
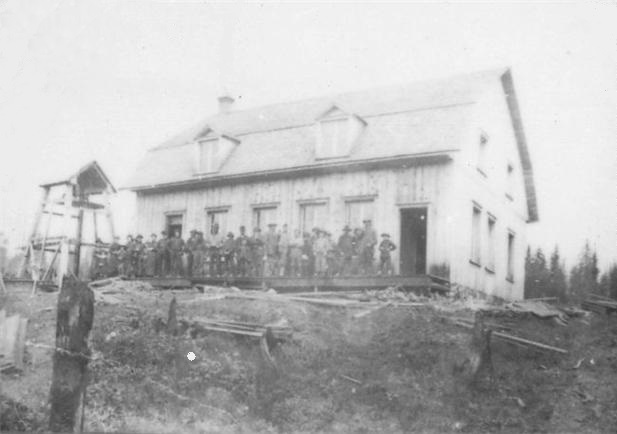
- Old chapel

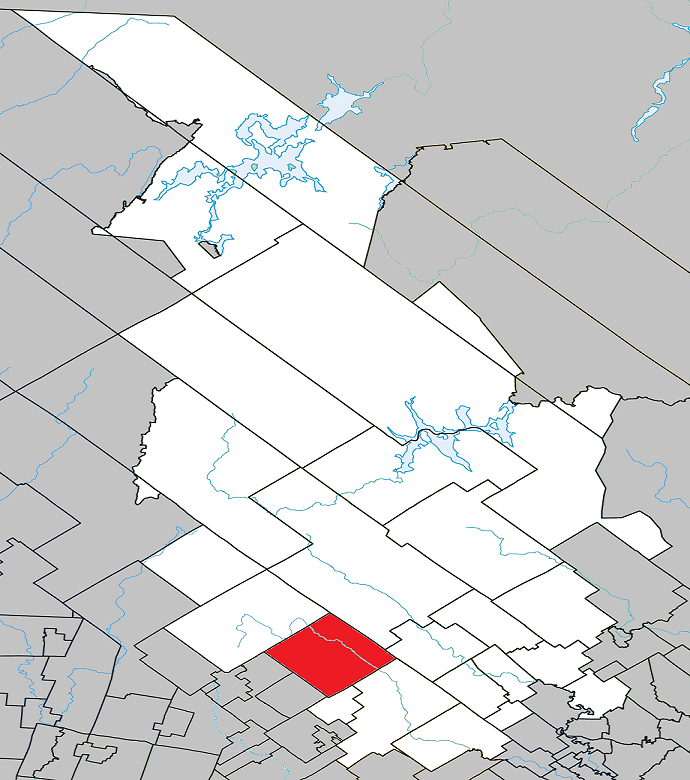
- Location within Matawinie RCM.

- Location in central Quebec.
- Coordinates: 46°14′N 74°03′W
- Country: Canada
- Province: Quebec
- Region: Lanaudière
- RCM: Matawinie
- Constituted: January 1, 1950

Government
  - Mayor: Robert Chicoine
  - Federal riding: Laurentides—Labelle
  - Prov. riding: Bertrand

Area
  - Total: 262.40 km^{2} (101.31 sq mi)
  - Land: 248.58 km^{2} (95.98 sq mi)

Population (2021)
  - Total: 1,097
  - Density: 4.4/km^{2} (11/sq mi)
  - Pop 2016-2021: ▲21.2%
  - Dwellings: 1,206
- Time zone: UTC−5 (EST)
  - Summer (DST): UTC−4 (EDT)
- Postal code(s): J0T 2A0
- Area code: 819
- Highways: R-125; R-347
- Website: www.municipalite notredamedelamerci.com

Notre-Dame-de-la-Merci (French pronunciation: [nɔtʁə dam də la mɛʁsi]) is a municipality in the Lanaudière region of Quebec, Canada, part of the Matawinie Regional County Municipality.

== Etymology ==
The name "Notre-Dame-de-la-Merci" translates to "Our Lady of Mercy". It was the name used informally by the pioneers to reflect on the need to invoke divine mercy when facing a harsh time of colonization in the region. Before adopting this name, the local post office operated under the name "Rivière Dufresne" from 1889 to 1891, for the nearby Dufresne River.

== History ==
The first settlers arrived in Chilton Township during the 19th century. In 1879, parish priests from the Saint Donat and Saint Marguerite parish municipalities planted a cross at the location where the first church in the municipality was to be built. A chapel and tower bell were built between 1884 and 1887, and construction of the church started in 1912 and was completed in 1918, opening for the first time on September 23, 1918, the eve of the Feast of Our Lady of Ransom. After decades of operating primarily as a parish settlement, Notre-Dame-de-la-Merci underwent municipalization on January 1, 1950.

== Demographics ==
=== Population ===
Historical Census Data - Notre-Dame-de-la-Merci, Quebec

Year	Pop.	±%
1951	325	—
1956	327	+0.6%
1961	326	−0.3%
1966	359	+10.1%
1971	330	−8.1%

Year	Pop.	±%
1976	351	+6.4%
1981	442	+25.9%
1986	487	+10.2%
1991	535	+9.9%
1996	726	+35.7%

Year	Pop.	±%
2001	811	+11.7%
2006	1,056	+30.2%
2011	978	−7.4%
2016	905	−7.5%
2021	1,097	+21.2%

Private dwellings occupied by usual residents: 619 (total dwellings: 1206)

=== Language ===
Mother tongue:

- English as first language: 2.7%
- French as first language: 93.2%
- English and French as first language: 0.9%
- Other as first language: 2.7%

== Education ==
Commission scolaire des Samares operates Francophone public schools:

- Notre-Dame-de-la-Merci — Saint-Émile (pavillon Notre-Dame-de-la-Merci)

Sir Wilfrid Laurier School Board operates Anglophone public schools:

- Rawdon Elementary School in Rawdon
- Joliette High School in Joliette

== Notable people ==
- Ray Daviault ,(1934–2020) Former MLB pitcher for the New York Mets.

== See also ==
- List of municipalities in Quebec
