= Church of Saint Roch =

Church of Saint Roch or variants may refer to:

== Churches in France ==
- Église Saint Roch, Marseille
- Saint-Roch, Paris
- Saint-Roch church in Louesme, in Champignelles
- Saint Roch church in La-Boulesq, in Pomayrols

== Churches in other countries ==
- Saint-Roch Church (Quebec City), Canada
- Church of Saint Roch, Žižkov, Prague, Czech Republic
- San Rocco, Venice, Italy
- San Rocco, Rome, Italy
- St Roque's Church, Mdina, Malta
- St Roque's Church, Valletta, Malta
- St. Roch's Church, Białystok, Poland
- Igreja de São Roque, Lisbon, Portugal
- St. Roch Church (Greenwich, Connecticut), United States

== See also ==
- Saint Roch
- Saint-Roch (disambiguation)
- San Rocco (disambiguation)
