= Rosh =

Rosh (Hebrew: ראש, "head" or "leader") may refer to:

- Rosh (biblical figure), a minor Biblical figure, mentioned in the Book of Genesis and possibly a nation listed in Ezekiel
- Rosh, a son of Benjamin in the Book of Genesis
- "The Rosh", Rabbi Asher ben Jehiel (1250–1328) a prominent Talmudic scholar
- Lea Rosh, German television journalist and publicist
- Cognate with Amharic Ras (title) and Arabic Rais
- Rosh (film), an Indian Hindi language crime thriller film

== See also ==
- Rosh Hashanah (disambiguation)
- ROHS (disambiguation)
- Roche (disambiguation)
