= Saint-Roch =

Saint-Roch or variants may refer to:

== Places ==
=== Canada ===
- Saint-Roch, Quebec City
- Saint-Roch-de-l'Achigan, Quebec
- Saint-Roch-de-Mékinac, Quebec
- Saint-Roch-de-Richelieu, Quebec
- Saint-Roch-des-Aulnaies, Quebec
- Saint-Roch-Ouest, Quebec
- Saint-Roch River, in Quebec
- Little Saint Roch River, in Quebec

=== France ===
- Saint-Roch, Indre-et-Loire
- Saint-Roch-sur-Égrenne

=== United States ===
- St. Roch, New Orleans, Louisiana

== Other uses ==
- Saint-Roch, Paris, a church in France
- Saint-Roch (Somme) station, in Amiens, France

== See also ==
- Saint Roch, a Majorcan Catholic confessor
- Church of Saint Roch (disambiguation)
- Roch (disambiguation)
- Montpellier-Saint-Roch station, in Montpellier, France
