= Rotch =

Rotch may refer to

== Birds ==
- Rotch or rotche, common names for the little auk

== Surname ==
- Abbott Lawrence Rotch (1861–1912), American meteorologist
- Arthur Rotch (1850–1894), American architect
- Edith Rotch (1874–1969), American tennis player
- Benjamin Rotch (1794–1854), British barrister, politician and author
- Francis J. Rotch (1863–1918), American politician from Washington State
- Francis M. Rotch (1822–1863), American politician from New York
- Thomas Morgan Rotch (1849–1914), American pediatrician

== See also ==
- Roch (disambiguation)
