= Roch (disambiguation) =

Saint Roch was a Christian saint who lived c.1295–1327.

Roch or St. Roch may also refer to:

== Places ==
- River Roch, Greater Manchester, England
- Roch Castle, near Haverfordwest, Wales
- Roch, Pembrokeshire, a village in Wales
- Roch, Iran, a village in Kohgiluyeh and Boyer-Ahmad Province, Iran
- Nickname of Rochester, Minnesota
- St. Roch, New Orleans, neighborhood

== People with the surname ==
- Gilles Roch (born 1952), Canadian politician
- Gustav Roch (1839–1866), German mathematician
- Philippe Roch (born 1949), Swiss civil servant
- Walter Roch (1880–1965), Welsh politician

== People with the given name ==
- Roch Carrier (born 1937), Canadian author
- Roch Cholette (born 1963), Canadian accountant and politician
- Roch Cholowsky (born 2005), American baseball player
- Roch Marc Christian Kaboré (born 1957), Burkina Faso politician
- Roch La Salle (1929–2007), Canadian politician in Quebec
- Roch Pinard (1910–1974), Canadian politician
- Roch Thériault (born 1947), Canadian cult leader and convicted murderer
- Roch Voisine (born 1963), Canadian Acadian singer-songwriter, actor, and radio and television host

== Miscellaneous ==
- Roch III coat of arms
- St. Roch (ship)
- St Roch's F.C., a football club in Glasgow, Scotland

== See also ==
- Roche (disambiguation)
- Rotch (disambiguation)
- Saint-Roch (disambiguation)
- Church of Saint Roch (disambiguation)
