= Francis Rotch =

Francis Rotch may refer to:

- Francis J. Rotch (1863–1918), American politician in the state of Washington
- Francis M. Rotch (1822–1863), American politician from New York
- Francis Rotch (merchant) (1750–1822), whaling merchant in the American colonies
