= Roche Group =

Roche may refer to:

- The Roche Group, an Australian property development company established by Imelda Roche and her husband Bill Roche in 2000
- Roche Holding AG, the multinational pharmaceutical firm based in Switzerland

== See also ==
- Roche (disambiguation)
