= National Air Pollution Monitoring Network =

Swiss air pollution monitoring org

- Abbreviation: NABEL
- Formation: 1968; 58 years ago
- Purpose: Tracking air pollution in Switzerland
- Headquarters: Dübendorf, Canton of Zürich, Switzerland
- Location: Switzerland

The National Air Pollution Monitoring Network (NABEL) is a joint project of the Swiss Federal Office for the Environment (BAFU) and the Swiss Federal Laboratories for Materials Science and Technology (EMPA), based in Dübendorf, in the canton of Zurich.

== Establishment of the National Monitoring Network ==
As part of an international collaboration of 11 countries, EMPA has been continuously measuring air pollutants since 1968, initially with four stations. From 1972 to 1977, the measurements were continued in the OECD Base Program, and the project was expanded to eight stations in 1978. The international measurements of the European Monitoring and Evaluation Programme (EMEP) were integrated following the signing of the United Nations Economic Commission for Europe (UN/ECE) Convention on Long Range Transboundary Air Pollution the following year. Within the framework of the research program "Forest Damage and Air Pollution in Switzerland" (NFP14), measurements were taken at three forest sites. The measurement network was expanded to its current level of 16 stations in 1990/91.

== Activities and monitoring stations ==
NABEL monitors the current air pollutant levels and tracks the long-term development of air quality in Switzerland. The monitoring network consists of 16 stations distributed throughout Switzerland: Basel Sternwarte St. Margarethen, Bern, Beromünster (replacing the former Lägern station since summer 2016), Chaumont, Davos, Dübendorf (replaced in 2020), Härkingen, Jungfraujoch, Lausanne, Lugano, Magadino, Payerne, Rigi, Sion, Tänikon, and Zurich. These locations reflect the most common air pollution situations in Switzerland, ranging from low to high levels of pollution. Despite the relatively small number of measurement points, a detailed picture of air quality in Switzerland can be obtained.

Some of the stations are part of international measurement programs, namely the European Monitoring and Evaluation Programme (EMEP) and the Global Atmosphere Watch (GAW).

In addition to the stations that primarily cover the northeast and western parts of Switzerland, additional monitoring stations are operated by Swiss cantons and cities as part of the Cercl’Air network. Cercl’Air is an association of Swiss authorities and university representatives in the field of air quality control and non-ionizing radiation.

NABEL also serves as a platform for research projects.

== Gallery ==
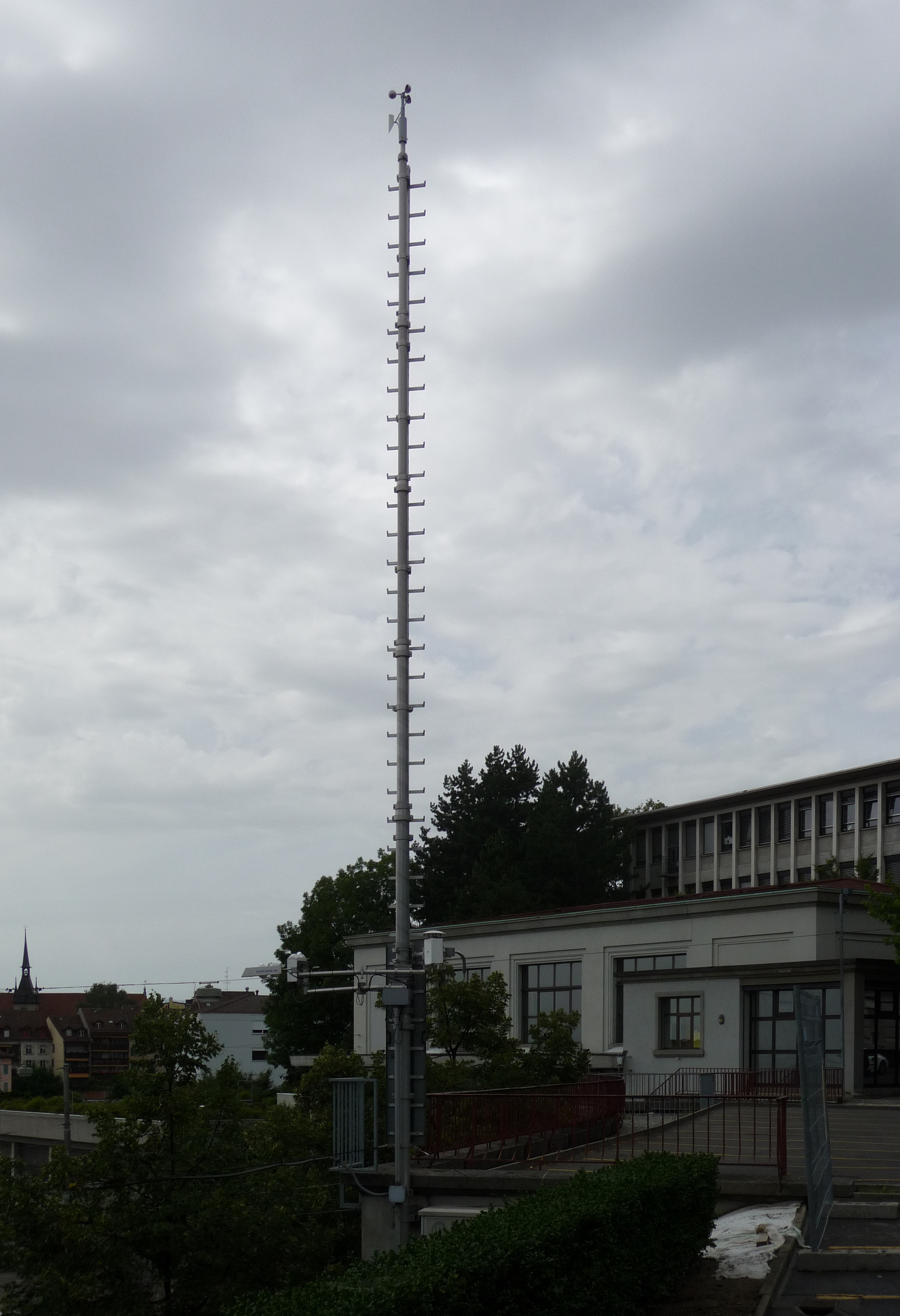
Station in Lausanne

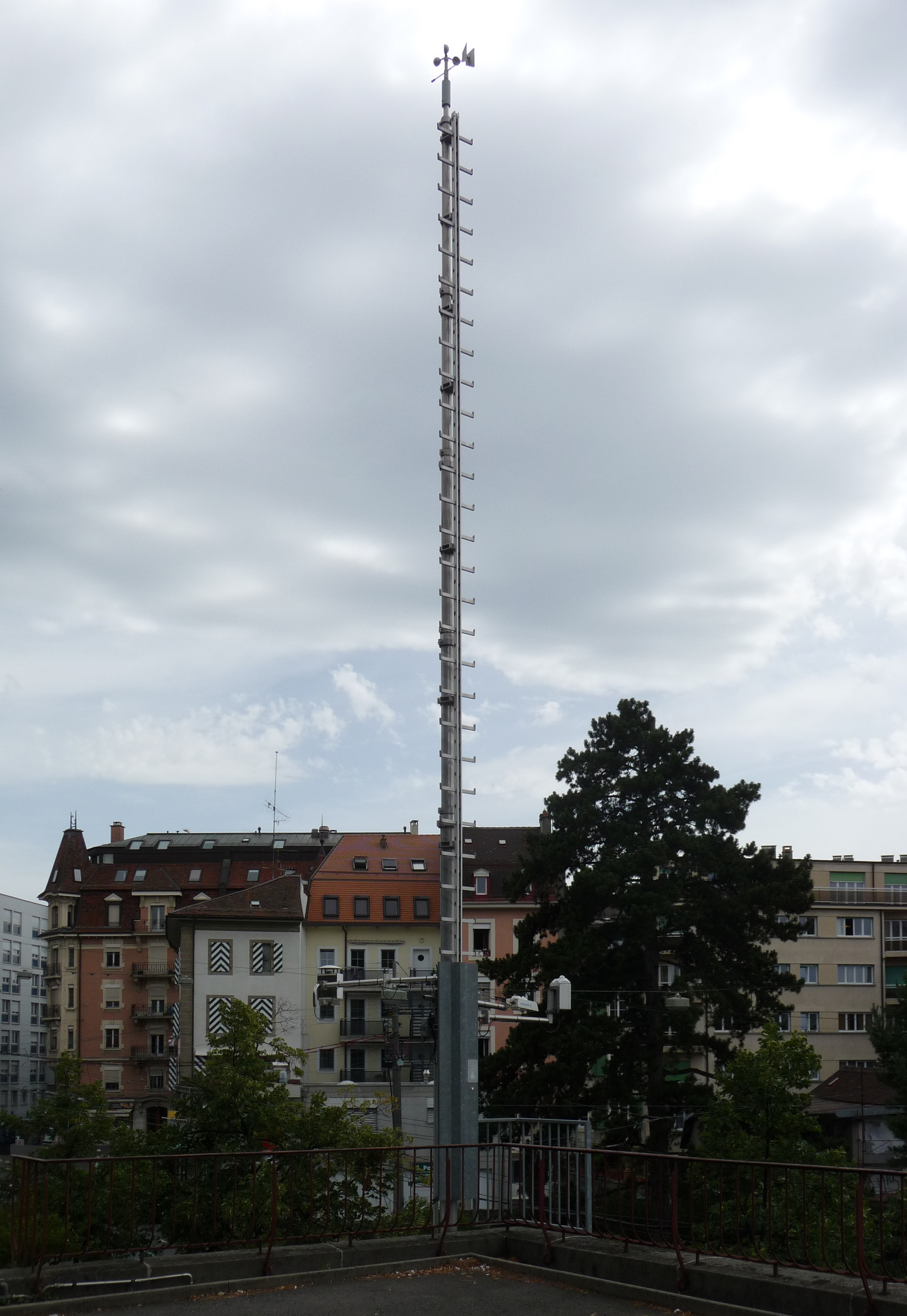
Reverse side

== See also ==
Air pollution

== Literature ==
P. Lüscher: Overall Swiss classification of the three observation areas from a soil science perspective. In: Programmleitung NFP14 (Ed.): Lufthaushalt, Luftverschmutzung und Waldschäden in der Schweiz: Ergebnisse aus dem Nationalen Forschungsprogramm 14, Band 6. Verlag der Fachvereine, Zurich 1991.
