= Abu Ali Hassan al-Mani'i =

Abu Ali Hassan al-Mani'i, full name Abū ‘Alī Ḥassān ibn Sa'd al-Manī‘ī al-Ḥājjī, was an 11th-century merchant, jurist, and muhaddith who served as ra'is of the city of Nishapur during the reign of Alp Arslan. Known for his wealth and piety, he was a prominent patron of the Shafi'i madhhab (although overshadowed by his more famous contemporary Nizam al-Mulk) and was given permission by Alp Arslan to build a second congregational mosque in Nishapur to serve the Shafi'i community. He also had several other mosques, ribats, and madrasas built. He died in 1071 (463 AH). His sons were also prominent religious leaders in Nishapur; they included Abu'l-Fath Abd al-Razzaq al-Mani'i al-Makhzumi (d. 1097/491 AH) and Abu Ahmad Kamal (d. 1116-7/510 AH). His grandson Taj al-Din Abu Muhammad Mani'i ibn Mas'ud was also a prominent jurist and hakim in Nishapur and ra'is of Khurasan.
