= Ary Bitter =

French artist (1883–1973)

- Born: 1883; Marseille, Bouches-du-Rhône, France
- Died: 1973 (aged 89–90); Paris, France
- Education: École des Beaux-Arts de Marseille; École nationale supérieure des Beaux-Arts
- Occupations: Sculptor, painter, designer

Ary Bitter (1883–1973) was a French artist, best known for his animal sculptures. He was a designer, painter, and sculptor in various mediums including plaster, stone, terracotta and bronze. His work was also produced in biscuit porcelain by the Sèvres factory.

== Biography ==
=== Early life ===
Ary Jean Léon Bitter was born in Marseille in 1883. and In 1895 he enrolled at the Marseille Beaux Arts and was taught by Émile Aldebert and from 1913 by Jules Coutan. He was a successful student, winning first prize in sculpture in 1900 and in 1901 he received commendations both for sculpture and design. In 1902, courtesy of a bursary from the City of Marseille, he left for Paris and joined the studio of Louis-Ernest Barrias and in 1906 was admitted to the École nationale supérieure des Beaux-Arts.

=== Career ===
In 1910, his work "l'Enfant au chevreau" received an "honourable mention" and he carried off the school's "Chenavard" prize. The following year, in 1911, he won the "Lemaire" prize. and a year later, in 1912, he exhibited at the Salon des Artistes Français and was a regular exhibitor there up until 1939. He won a bronze medal at the 1913 Salon and the silver medal at the 1921 Salon. In 1913, he worked on a public fountain in Nantes.

In 1921, he was commissioned to work on the Sanary-sur-Mer war memorial as well as those in the Marseille cemeteries of St Louis and St Jérôme. In 1923, he created a "mascot" for Mme Louis Renault's car. and 1924 saw him win the gold at that years Paris Salon and the next year he was one of the sculptors featured by the founder Susse Frères in an exhibition at the Boulevard de la Madeleine showroom. He was in fact commissioned by Susse Frères to work with them on several limited editions. 1926 saw his work as part of the decoration of Marseille's St Charles station and the work "Bonne Mère" for the cathedral. In 1927, he exhibited the work "Chloé allongée" at the Salon. and 1931 saw him exhibit a bronze version of "Diane Chasseresse" and in 1932 he was made a "Chevalier de la Légion d'Honneur" and his "Cajolerie" was declared "hors concours" at that year's Salon. In 1935 he showed two works at the Salon, "Léda" and "Le Cygne".

Further honours followed when in 1937 he was awarded a gold medal at the Exposition Internationale des Arts et des Techniques de Paris and he was invited to show work at the "Palais de la Céramique" and the "Palais du Métal". He was also given a "diplôme d'honneur" by the École nationale supérieure des Beaux-Arts. In 1938, he created ten works in terracotta for the Musée Hector-Berlioz and in 1940, 3 griffons for a fountain in Pithiviers. In 1949, he worked on the Cambo-les-Bains monument to Edmond Rostand.

=== Death ===
He died in Paris in 1973.

== Main works ==
Name	Location	Date	Notes]
"Le drame et la poésie offrant leurs hommages au"	Beaux-Arts de Paris.	1911	A plaster bas-relief submitted in the competition for the "Lemaire" prize. It won both the prize and a gold medal.
The "Pavillon de l'alimentation"	Bern	1914	Bitter was commissioned to create a sculpture for the 1914 Exposition Nationale Suisse held in Bern. The work was not kept.
Mazargues War Memorial (monument aux morts)	Mazargues cemetery. Marseille.		In Bitter's composition an "Angel of Victory" with wings spread, is placing a crown of laurel on the head of a French soldier. Beneath these figures a woman wearing a mourning veil is depicted with her child.
"Les Colonies d'Asie" and "Les Colonies d'Afrique"	La gare Saint-Charles de Marseille	1923 to 1924	This main railway station has a large flight of stairs designed by the architects Eugène Sénès and Léon Arnal and using reinforced concrete. The competition for the designs of the stairway, intended to improve movement between the town centre and the railway station forecourt, was opened in 1911 but the 1914-1918 war delayed completion of the project until 1925. The stairs run from the railway station to the Boulevard d'Athènes. The area is the site of much sculptural work including a group of lions and children by Arry Bitter and the works "Marseille Colonie Grecque" and "Marseille Porte d'Orient" by Auguste Carli. There are also six small bronze groups representing the produce of Provence. These are by Henri Raybaud and cover "les vendages", "les fruits", "la pêche", "les fleurs", "la moisson" and "la chasse". At the bottom of either side of the main stairs are two large sculptures by Botinelly. One, called "Colonies d'Asie" represents colonial Asia and the other, called "Colonies d'Afrique", represents colonial Africa. Escalier monumental de la gare de Marseille-Saint-Charles
Bargemon War Memorial (monument aux morts)	Bargemon	1921	The war memorial is located in the rue Jean-Jaurès and features an infantryman standing on a rock which serves as a pedestal carrying the names of those remembered. He stands "at ease" leaning on his rifle.
Houdan War Memorial (monument aux morts)	Houdan	1923	The Houdan war memorial stands in front of the Houdan mairie and features a soldier (Poilu) and a relief depicting the Croix de Guerre. On the pedestal is the dedication and on each side are palms of the "Union Nationale des Combattants". On the three other faces of the pedestal the names of the dead are listed both of the Great War and the Second World War (including civilians) and the Algerian conflict. The sculpture of the bronze soldier is the work of Bitter.
Diana	École professionnelle dite Ecole nationale d'Optique puis lycée polyvalent Victor Bérard. Morez		A statue in white porcelain. In Bitter's composition a naked Diana sits deep in thought on a semi-circular pedestal . The statuette was acquired by the French State from the 1923 Salon des Artistes français and from 1926 onwards the Manufacture nationale de Sèvres produced editions in coloured biscuit, in terracotta and other mediums and continued to do so until 1933. One copy can be seen in Roubaix at the Musée d'Art et d'Industrie. The version at the Lycee was produced by Henri Robert the Sèvres modeller from 1889 to 1933.
Medallion depicting Louis Vidon	Bourg-Argental		For Vidon's grave in Bourg-Argental's cemetery, Bitter executed a marble medallion. Vidon was a politician and mayor of Bourg-Argental and deputy for the Loire from 1906 to 1910.
Keystones (clefs d'arc)	Vitry-sur-Seine	1932–1936	The building at 4 route de Fontainebleau in Vitry-sur-Seine was an orphanage but is now a school (Adolphe Chérioux). Bitter created two keystones for the entrances, one depicts a young girl reading a book and the other a young woman seated at a desk with a needlework box.
"Bacchus Enfant"	Marseille. Musée Cantini	1937	A statuette
"Femme assise"	Barentin	1937	A work in terracotta which can be seen in the Barentin mairie.
Monument to Edmond Rostand	Marseille		This monument was inaugurated on 13 April 1930.
Pavillon de la Céramique et de la Verrerie	Quai d'Orsay. Paris	1937	For the entrance of the 1937 " Exposition internationale des arts et techniques", Bitter executed the work "La Verrerie".
