= Saint-Roch-de-l'Achigan =

- Municipality
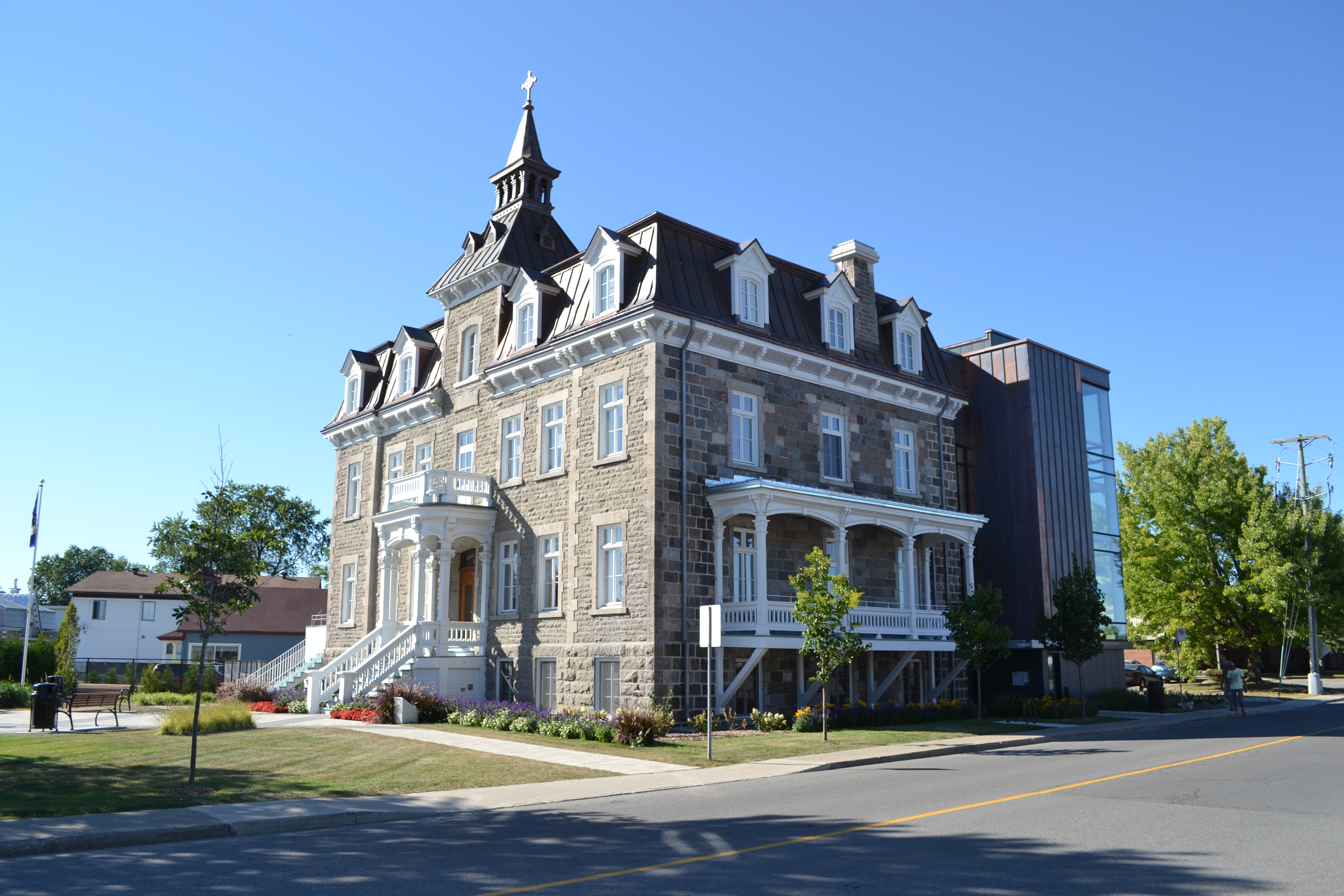

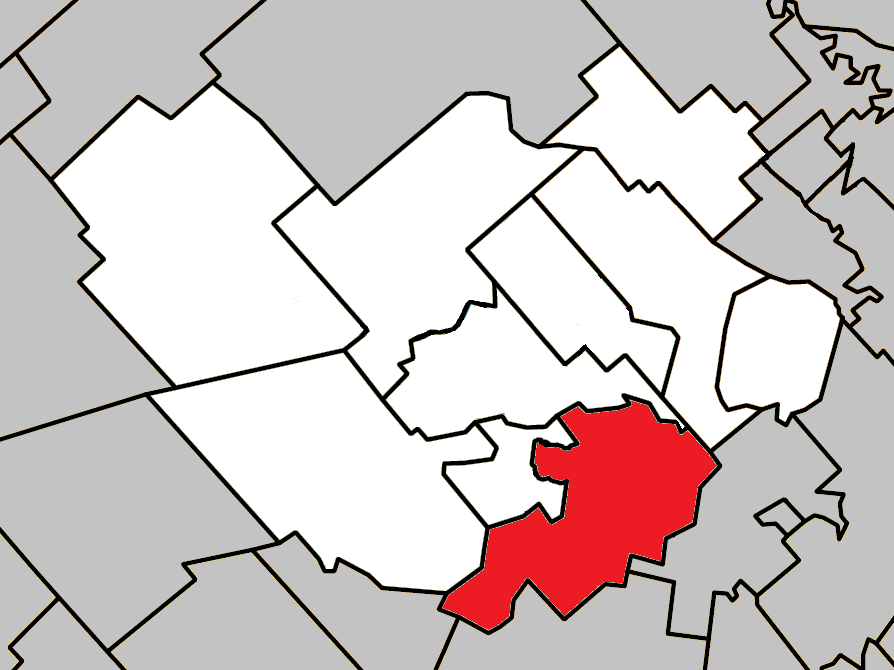
- Location within Montcalm RCM

- Location in central Quebec
- Coordinates: 45°51′N 73°36′W
- Country: Canada
- Province: Quebec
- Region: Lanaudière
- RCM: Montcalm
- Settled: 1770
- Constituted: July 1, 1855

Government
  - Mayor: Sébastien Marcil
  - Federal riding: Montcalm
  - Prov. riding: Rousseau

Area
  - Municipality: 79.94 km^{2} (30.87 sq mi)
  - Land: 80.06 km^{2} (30.91 sq mi)
  - Urban: 1.41 km^{2} (0.54 sq mi)
- There is an apparent discrepancy between 2 authoritative sources.

Population (2021)
  - Municipality: 5,453
  - Density: 68.1/km^{2} (176/sq mi)
  - Urban: 2,136
  - Urban density: 1,515.1/km^{2} (3,924/sq mi)
  - Pop (2016–21): ▲5.9%
  - Dwellings: 2,226
- Time zone: UTC−5 (EST)
  - Summer (DST): UTC−4 (EDT)
- Postal code(s): J0K 3H0
- Area codes: 450, 579
- Highways A-25: R-125; R-339; R-341
- Website: sra.quebec

Saint-Roch-de-l'Achigan is a municipality located in the Montcalm Regional County Municipality, in the Lanaudière region of Quebec, Canada. It is on the banks of the Achigan River, a tributary of the L'Assomption River. According to the town's website, the population is approximately 5,400 and growing steadily as a result of the suburban sprawl in the North Shore of Greater Montreal.

== History ==
The first settlers arrived near the 1770s and built a flour mill on a township located alongside the Rivière de l'Achigan. The area was located on the northern edges of the first developed lands that were located along both sides of the Saint Lawrence River. In 1787, the Saint-Roch-de-l'Achigan Parish was formed and in 1832, its post office opened, three years after the construction of its first school. In 1845, the parish municipality was established. It was abolished in 1847 when it became part of the County Municipality of Lachenaie, but was reestablished in 1855 as the Parish Municipality of Saint-Roch.

In 1921, Saint-Roch lost a part of its territory when the Municipality of Saint-Roch-Ouest was formed. In 1957, it regained its original name when "de-l'Achigan" was added in order to distinguish it from other places named "Saint-Roch". In 2006, it changed statutes and became the Municipality of Saint-Roch-de-l'Achigan.

== Geography ==
The municipality covers an area of 80 km^{2}. The Achigan River flows through the municipality from north-west to south-east. The Saint-Esprit River forms the north-eastern boundary of the municipality and flows towards the south-east.

== Demographics ==
Historical census populations – Saint-Roch-de-l'Achigan

Year	Pop.	±%
1861	2,784	—
1871	2,523	−9.4%
1881	2,290	−9.2%
1891	2,048	−10.6%
1901	1,841	−10.1%
1911	2,200	+19.5%
1921	1,718	−21.9%
1931	1,440	−16.2%

Year	Pop.	±%
1941	1,632	+13.3%
1951	1,782	+9.2%
1956	1,910	+7.2%
1961	2,109	+10.4%
1966	2,316	+9.8%
1971	2,721	+17.5%
1976	3,063	+12.6%
1981	3,436	+12.2%

Year	Pop.	±%
1986	3,535	+2.9%
1991	3,795	+7.4%
1996	4,305	+13.4%
2001	4,164	−3.3%
2006	4,449	+6.8%
2011	4,892	+10.0%
2016	5,147	+5.2%
2021	5,453	+5.9%

Population counts are not adjusted for boundary changes.
Source: Statistics Canada

Private dwellings occupied by usual residents (2021): 2,165 (total dwellings: 2,226)

Mother tongue (2021):

- English as first language: 1.2%
- French as first language: 96.3%
- English and French as first language: 0.8%
- Other as first language: 1.3%

== Infrastructure ==
The town is accessible via Autoroute 25 which links Laval and Montreal towards the northeastern suburbs including Terrebonne and Mascouche. Since the Olivier-Charbonneau Bridge connecting Montreal and Laval was opened to traffic in 2011, it also has a direct link to the south shore of Montreal and Autoroutes 20 and 40. The municipality is located near the northern terminus of the Autoroute which continues further north via Route 125 towards the Mont-Tremblant Provincial Park north of Saint-Donat and Rawdon.

== Education ==
Commission scolaire des Samares operates francophone public schools:

- École secondaire de l'Achigan
- École Notre-Dame

The Sir Wilfrid Laurier School Board operates anglophone public schools, including:

- Joliette Elementary School in Saint-Charles-Borromée
- Joliette High School in Joliette

== See also ==
- List of municipalities in Quebec
