= Raymond Cayol =

French politician (1917–1997)

- Born: 29 January 1917; Marseille, Bouches-du-Rhône, France
- Died: 9 June 1997 (aged 80); Marseille, Bouches-du-Rhône, France
- Occupation: Politician

Raymond Cayol (1917–1997) was a French politician. He served as a Popular Republican Movement member of the French National Assembly for the Bouches-du-Rhône from 1946 to 1951.

== Biography ==
=== Early life ===
Raymond, Louis, Jean Cayol was born on 29 January 1917 in Marseille, Bouches-du-Rhône, France. His family was from Marseille. He graduated from Aix-Marseille University in Aix-en-Provence and from the University of Paris in Paris, and received the agrégation in Classics.

=== Career ===
During World War II, he was active in the French Resistance. In 1941, he joined Témoignage chrétien in Toulon. From 1942 to 1944, he served as a coordinator between members of the French Resistance, public administrators and members of the Popular Republican Movement, and helped in the liberation of France from Nazi Germany. He also served as Head of the Marseille region for the Jeunes chrétiens combattants, a Roman Catholic group of resistants. In 1944, he went on to join the Popular Republican Movement, a Christian, centrist political party founded in Marseille. He was a recipient of the Croix de guerre 1939–1945 and the Knighthood in the Legion of Honour for his role in the French resistance.

In 1945, he started teaching in a high school in Toulon. The same year, he ran unsuccessfully for the National Assembly. However, he was elected a year later, in 1946. He proposed bills regarding national education and other social policies. For example, he supported the advent of housing allowances, and the increase of bursaries for students. He also proposed a bill to speed up the naturalization of Armenians who fought for the French Republic during World War II. The same year, he expressed his enthusiasm for French democracy as an agreement between legislators and labour unions. He was re-elected in 1946, and focused again on national education, as well as maritime trade and the fishing industry. He voted for Léon Blum (1872–1950) as temporary President in 1946 and supported the government of Paul Ramadier (1888–1961) in 1947.

On 14 November 1947 he requested investigation into the murder of a Communist activist and the aggression of the Mayor of Marseille, Jean Cristofol (1901–1957), during a strike organized by the French Communist Party and the CGT the day before to protest the increased tram fare. He argued, "Only a stable and strong state can assure the respect of the law, relieve the people of their misery and thus, save the Republic." He called for the dissolution of the Compagnies Républicaines de Sécurité (CRS), an increased police force and functionaries, more funding for the Préfecture des Bouches-du-Rhône, and the ability for workers who want to get back to work to do it freely.

In 1948, he focused on maritime trade with Corsica. In 1951, he worked on legislations regarding the possibility to pay university students. However, his policies came to an end when he lost his reelection bid in 1951. That year, he served as an Advisor to the Minister of Public Education, and in 1952 as Advisor to the Minister of Overseas Territories. From 1952 onwards, he taught in a high school in Marseille. He was later appointed Knight in the Ordre des Palmes Académiques.

=== Personal life ===
He died on 9 June 1997 in Marseille.

== Legacy ==
- The Rue Raymond Cayol in Mazargues, a neighbourhood of the 9th arrondissement in Marseille, is named in his honour.
