= Biodiversity Monitoring Switzerland =

The Biodiversity Monitoring Switzerland (BDM) is a Swiss Confederation programme for the long-term monitoring of species diversity in Switzerland.

== Introduction ==
The Biodiversity Monitoring Switzerland surveys the long-term development of species diversity in selected organism groups in Switzerland. The focus is on surveying common and widespread species in order to make informed statements about the development of species diversity in common landscapes.

Biodiversity Monitoring Switzerland is a programme run by the Federal Office for the Environment FOEN. It is a long-term environmental monitoring project, comparable with other national programmes, such as the Swiss National Forest Inventory (NFI), the National Surface Water Quality Monitoring Programme (NAWA), the Swiss Soil Monitoring Network (NABO) and the project “Monitoring the Effectiveness of Habitat Conservation in Switzerland” (WBS) run by the WSL Institute. There are similar biodiversity monitoring programmes in place in the United Kingdom (UK Countryside Survey by the UK Centre for Ecology & Hydrology) and in parts of Canada (Alberta Biodiversity Monitoring run by the Alberta Biodiversity Monitoring Institute).

== Tasks and objectives ==
Together with other environmental information, the data from the Biodiversity Monitoring Switzerland underpin national conservation policy and other policy areas that are relevant to biodiversity such as agriculture and forestry. By signing the UN Convention on Biological Diversity (CBD), Switzerland also has an obligation under international law to monitor the long-term development of biodiversity.

The objectives of the Biodiversity Monitoring Switzerland are to

- draw representative conclusions about biodiversity in Switzerland as a whole (sometimes broken down by biogeographic region or main type of land use, e.g. grassland, forests, settlements etc.);
- monitor the evolution of species diversity as a whole, i.e. including in intensively managed areas and therefore draw conclusions about the common landscape;
- record the taxonomic groups in full, i.e. including all species, and thus supplement existing knowledge on rare and endangered species;
- document changes in species diversity and highlight long-term trends.

== Methodology ==
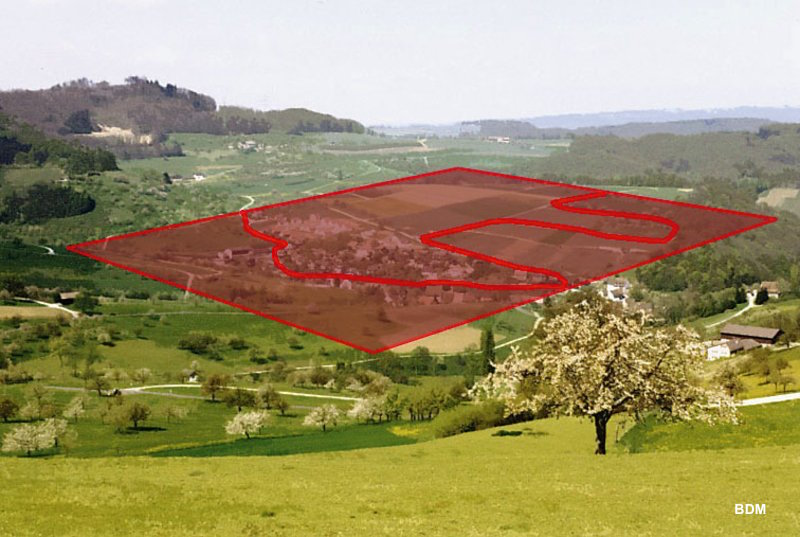
1-km^{2} sampling area for the “species diversity in landscapes” indicator with a transect marked

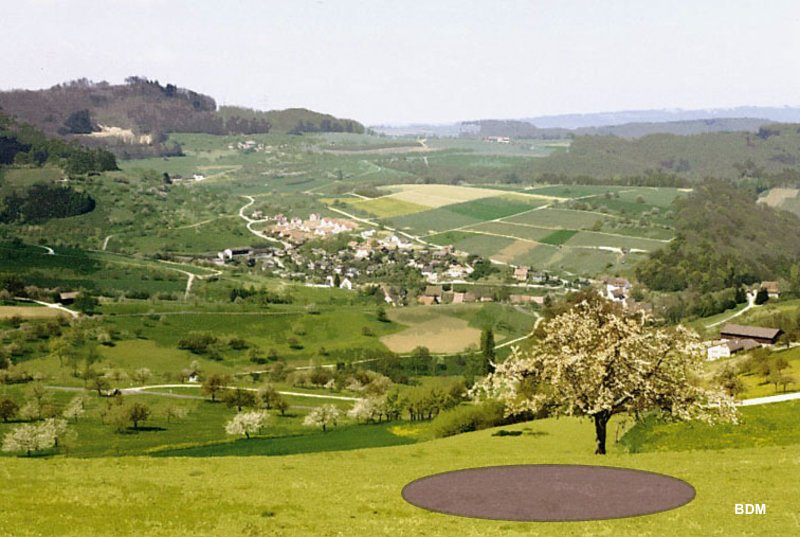
10-m^{2} sampling area for the “species diversity in habitats” indicator

The Biodiversity Monitoring Switzerland comprises three sampling grids on different scales, which cover the whole of Switzerland and yield a representative sample.

The sampling grid to observe species diversity in landscapes consists of some 500 sampling areas, each covering one square kilometre. On a precisely defined transect of this quadrant, vascular plants, butterflies and breeding birds are surveyed. Data on breeding birds are collected by the Swiss Ornithological Institute Sempach. These surveys are coordinated with the Monitoring of Common Breeding Birds. The density of the sampling grid in the Jura and in Southern Switzerland was increased in order to obtain reliable data for these regions.

The sampling grid to observe species diversity in habitats consists of some 1,450 sampling sites, each covering ten square metres. In terms of habitats a distinction is drawn between forests, meadows and pastures, settlements, farmland, alpine pastures and mountain areas. All the vascular plants found in a circular sampling area are surveyed. In addition, bryophyte samples are collected, which are subsequently identified by a team of experts, and soil samples are taken to study mollusc diversity in the laboratory.

The sampling grid to survey aquatic insects comprises approximately 500 small sections of minor watercourses measuring around 5–100 metres long. It surveys the larvae of mayflies, stoneflies and caddisflies (so-called EPT species group).

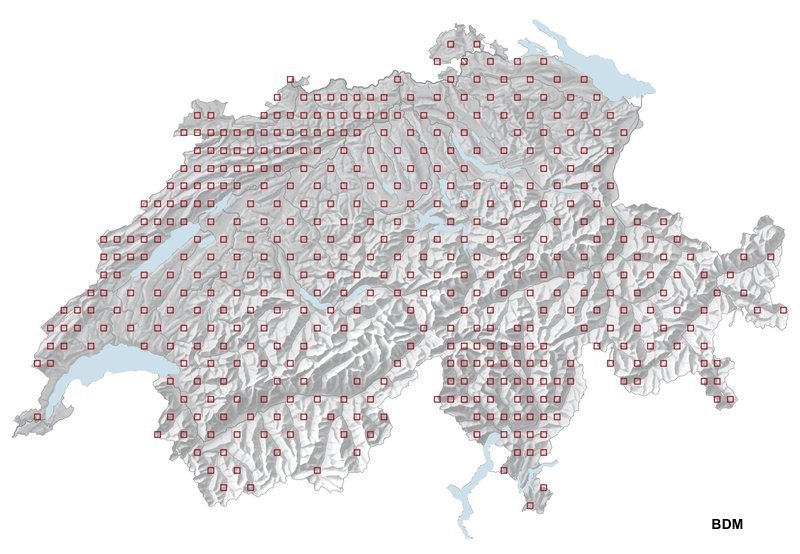
Sampling grid for species diversity in landscapes

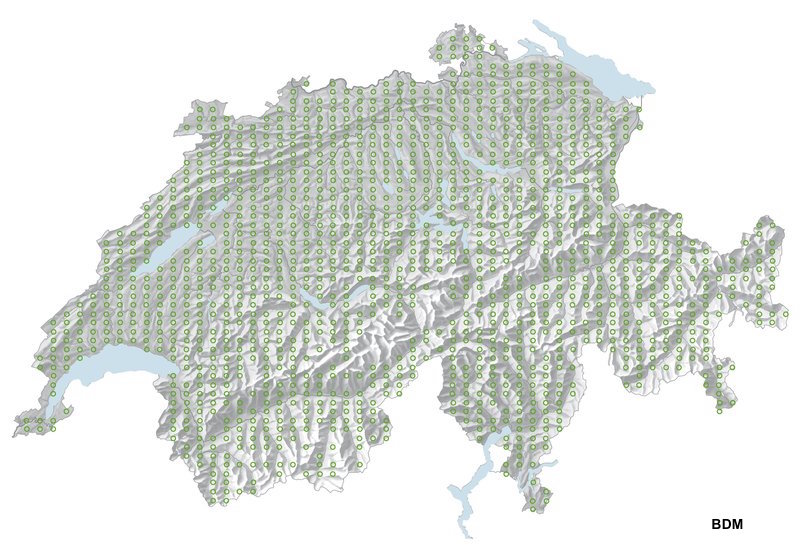
Sampling grid for species diversity in habitats

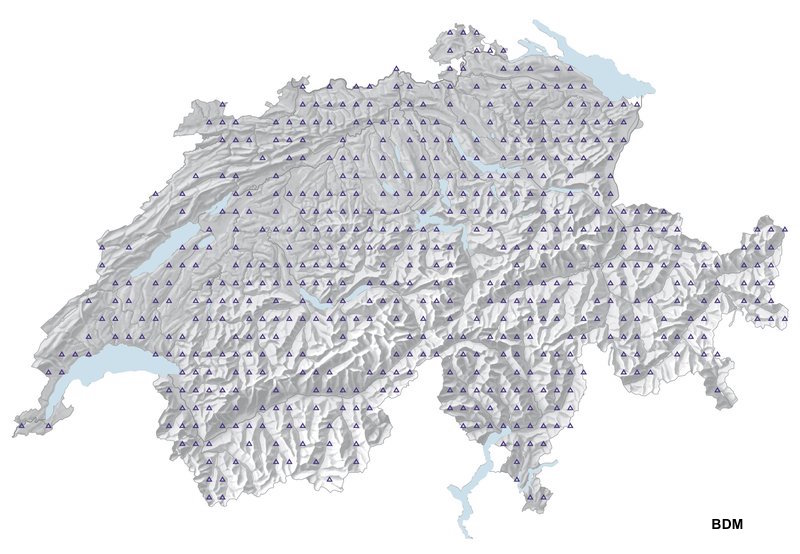
Sampling grid for species diversity in watercourses

The sampling areas can be precisely located as they are permanent observation plots. A fifth of all areas are surveyed every year, which means that a survey is repeated at the same location every five years. Routine surveys of vascular plants, bryophytes, molluscs and breeding birds were started in 2001, with surveys of butterflies added in 2003 and aquatic invertebrates added in 2010. The species’ coordinates are integrated in the databases of InfoSpecies, the Swiss Information Centre for Species.

== Indicators ==
The data obtained are routinely used to calculate four indicators:

- The species diversity in landscapes indicator shows the diversity of flora and fauna in the landscape. It describes the influence of habitat mosaics on species diversity.
- The species diversity in habitats indicator documents the small-scale species diversity of a habitat type, e.g. meadows, forests or settlements.
- The population size of common species indicator documents changes in widespread species. They are of ecological importance as they make up the majority of living biomass, provide a significant share of ecosystem services and constitute an abundant food source for other organisms. They shape the appearance of their habitats and characterise entire landscapes.
- The diversity in species communities indicator looks at whether Switzerland's habitats and landscapes are becoming more similar. It therefore provides information on the heterogeneity or homogeneity of species diversity.

In addition, the data can be used for various special analyses. They form the basis of numerous scientific research projects. Thanks to the systematic sampling design, the standardised methodology and the long-term nature of the programme, the data can be used to answer new, as yet undefined questions. The data are also incorporated in European biodiversity indicators, e.g. the European Grassland Butterfly Index compiled by Butterfly Conservation Europe and the European Environment Agency EEA. Furthermore, data from the Biodiversity Monitoring Switzerland contributed to the determination of critical loads in nitrogen deposition in Europe assessed due to the Convention on Long-Range Transboundary Air Pollution (CLRTAP) implemented by the European Monitoring and Evaluation Programme (EMEP).

== Distinctive features of the Biodiversity Monitoring Switzerland ==
The specific contribution of the Biodiversity Monitoring Switzerland to the analysis of species diversity in Switzerland is the fact that species lists can be drawn up that are as comprehensive as possible for all sampling areas, which increases the probability of detecting species absences. In addition, the Biodiversity Monitoring Switzerland is not restricted to well-known, highly species-rich areas or sites where rarities are found, but rather monitors randomly selected locations that would hardly ever be surveyed otherwise. Common and widespread species are thus also surveyed. Repeat surveys at exactly the same location using exactly the same method allow precise conclusions to be drawn regarding changes in species diversity.

Biodiversity Monitoring Switzerland provides a cross section of the overall landscape covering a wide variety of uses. It serves as a reference for programmes that study the development of selected habitats or of specific rare species, e.g. the project “Monitoring the effectiveness of habitat conservation in Switzerland” (WBS), and Switzerland's Red Lists.

== Notes ==
- FOEN: Swiss Biodiversity Monitoring BDM. Description of Methods and Indicators. Environmental Studies No. 1410, Federal Office for the Environment FOEN, Bern, 2014.
- Swiss Biodiversity Forum (eds.): 20 Jahre Biodiversitätsmonitoring Schweiz BDM, Special Issue of HOTSPOT 46, Swiss Biodiversity Forum, Bern, 2022. (in German and French only)
- Biodiversity Monitoring Switzerland BDM: Results from the Biodiversity Monitoring Switzerland after five periods of survey. Published by the Federal Office for the Environment FOEN, Bern, 2026. (in German)
