= Rivière des Roches =

Rivière des Roches may refer to:

== Canada ==
- Rivière des Roches (Saint-Augustin-de-Desmaures), a tributary the Saint Lawrence river in Saint-Augustin-de-Desmaures, Quebec
- Rivière des Roches (rivière du Berger), Québec City, Quebec
- Rivière des Roches (Sainte-Anne River tributary), in La Côte-de-Beaupré Regional County Municipality, Quebec
- Roches River (Verte River tributary), a tributary of the Verte River on the eastern shore of the Saint Lawrence river in Rivière-du-Loup, Bas-Saint-Laurent, Quebec (see List of rivers of Quebec#Watershed of Rivière du Loup and Eastern tributaries)
- Desroches River (Betsiamites River), a tributary of the Pipmuacan Reservoir in Lac-au-Brochet, Côte-Nord, Quebec (see List of rivers of Quebec#North-shore Betsiamites River and tributaries eastward)

== France ==
- Rivière des Roches (Réunion)
