= Roche (disambiguation) =

Roche (F. Hoffmann–La Roche) is a Swiss healthcare company.

Roche may also refer to:

== Companies ==
- Roche Diagnostics, a division of F. Hoffmann–La Roche
  - Roche Applied Science, a business group of Roche Diagnostics
- The Roche Group, an Australian property development company established by Imelda and Bill Roche in 2000

== Places ==
=== France ===
- Roche, Isère, in the Isère department
- Roche-en-Forez, in the Loire department
- Roches, Creuse, in the Creuse department
- Roches, Loir-et-Cher, in the Loir-et-Cher department

=== Switzerland ===
- Roche, Vaud, in the Aigle district, canton of Vaud
- Roches, Switzerland, a village in the canton of Bern

=== United Kingdom ===
- Roche, Cornwall
- Roche Abbey, South Yorkshire, England

=== Outer space ===
- Roche (crater), a crater on the Moon

== People ==
- Roche (surname)
- Roche baronets, baronetcy of Great Britain
- Roche Braziliano, Dutch buccaneer
- The Roches, Irish-American singer-songwriter group of siblings

== Science and mathematics ==
- Roche limit (also known as the "Roche radius"), a concept in celestial mechanics
- Roche lobe, a concept in celestial mechanics
- Roche (spider), a spider genus in the family Ochyroceratidae
- Rouché's theorem

== Other uses ==
- Roch (disambiguation)
- Rosh (disambiguation)
- Rivière des Roches (disambiguation)
- Roche convention, a defense against a one notrump (1NT) opening in contract bridge
- Ruché, an Italian wine grape
