= Marc Chardonnens =

Swiss government official (1960–2020)

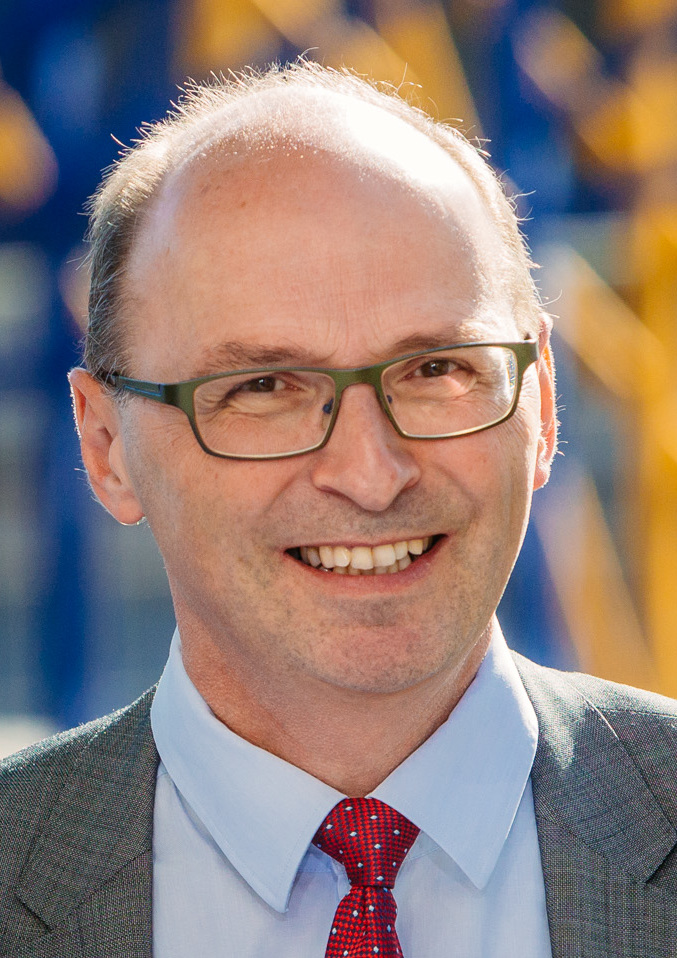
- Chardonnens in 2017
- Born: 1960
- Died: 6 April 2020 (aged 59–60)
- Occupation: Government Official

Marc Chardonnens (1960 – 6 April 2020) was a Swiss government official.

== Biography ==
After studying agricultural science at ETH Zurich, Chardonnens completed a master's degree in public administration at the University of Lausanne. He worked at the Federal Office for Environmental Protection from 1987 to 2004, then at the Federal Office for the Environment, Forests and Landscape, first as a scientific collaborator, then as a leader in the waste management sector.

In 2004, he was appointed as head of the environmental department of the Canton of Fribourg. Here, he chaired the conférence des chefs des services de la protection de l'environnement from 2011 to 2015. On 27 January 2016, the Federal Council elected him Director of the Federal Office for the Environment following the departure of Bruno Oberle. He took office on 11 April 2016, and resigned in late January 2020, citing health concerns. He made this announcement on 7 November 2019, and was replaced by interim director Christine Hofmann.

Chardonnens died on 6 April 2020.
