= Mazargues =

French neighbourhood

Coordinates: 43.251°N 5.404°E

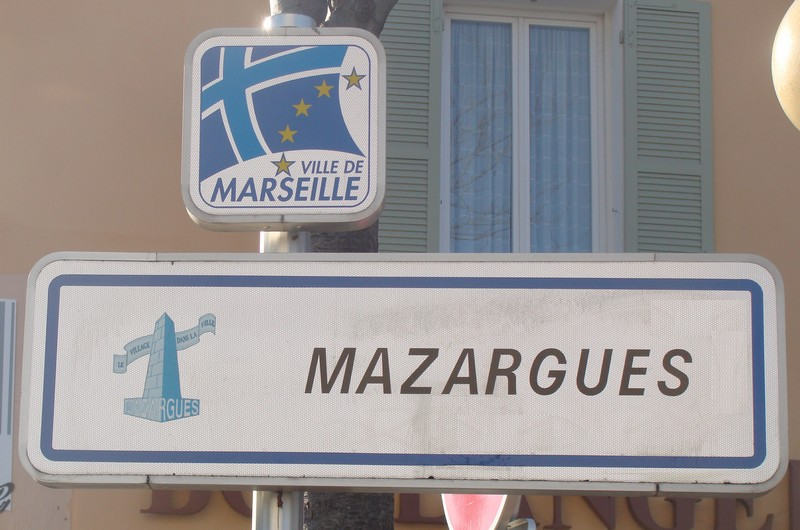
Street sign

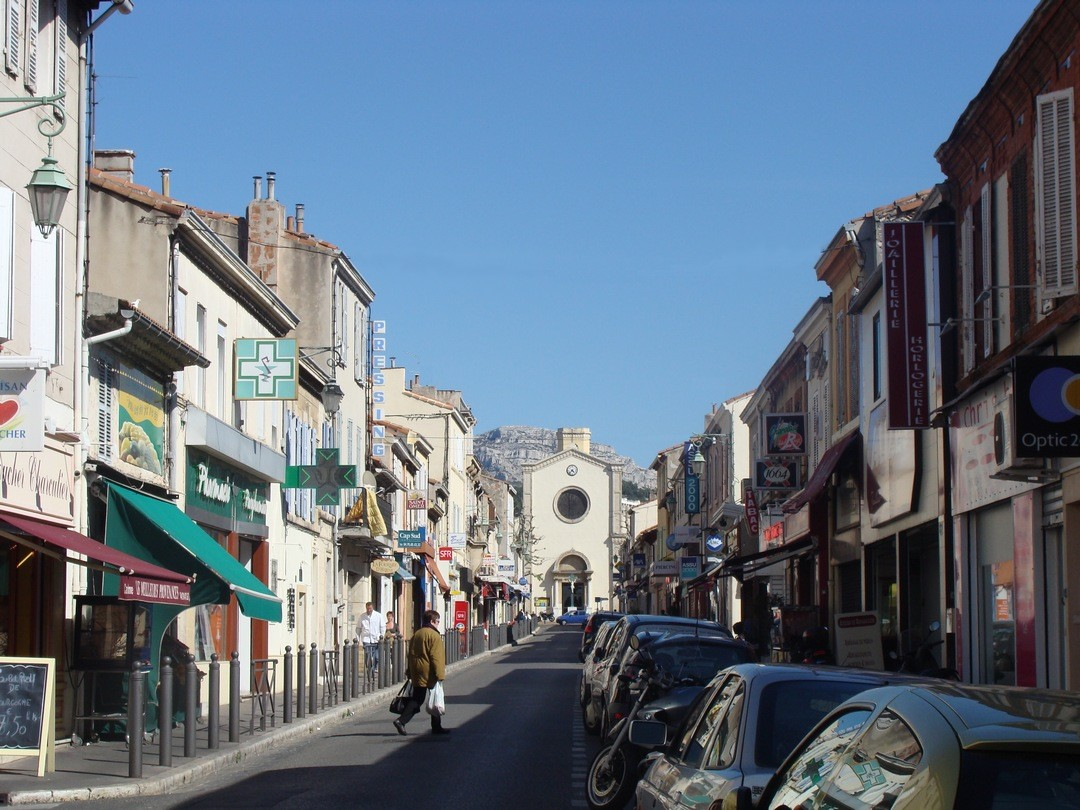
Rue Émile-Zola, with the Eglise Saint Roch in the background

Mazargues (French pronunciation: [mazaʁɡ]) is a former village and now a neighbourhood of the 9th arrondissement in Marseille, Bouches-du-Rhône, France.

== History ==
Françoise-Marguerite de Sévigné (1646–1705), a French aristocrat, had a bastide in Mazargues. On February 5, 1703, in a letter to Mrs de Coulanges, he described it in those terms: "You only see people who live until a hundred years old; there are no illnesses; the good air and good water make it the realm of health and beauty. In this area, you only see pretty faces, only good-looking men, and old people just, like young people, have the most beautiful teeth in the world. If ever there are people who come close to those of Telemachus, it is those of Mazargues."

According to historian Alfred Saurel (1827-1887), the Château de Mazargues, located on the corner of Chemin du Lancier and Chemin de Mazargues, was burned down during the French Revolution of 1789.

== Main sights ==
The obelisk was originally built on the Place Castellane in 1811 in honour of Napoleon II (1811-1832). It was moved to the roundabout in Mazargues in 1911.

It is home to the Église Saint Roch, a Roman Catholic church named for Saint Roch.

It is also home to the Mazargues Commonwealth War Cemetery, which includes 1,487 burials of casualties from World War I and 267 burials of casualties from the Second World War.

The main street, Rue Émile-Zola, is named in honour of writer Émile Zola (1840-1902). Another street, Rue Henri Revoil, is named for architect Henri Révoil (1822-1900), son of painter Pierre Révoil (1776-1842). Rue Raymond Cayol is named for Raymond Cayol (1917-1997), who served as a member of the French National Assembly for the Bouches-du-Rhône from 1946 to 1951. As for the Avenue du Maréchal de Lattre de Tassigny, where the obelisk meets, it is named for Marshall Jean de Lattre de Tassigny (1889-1952), who served in World War II and the First Indochina War. Moreover, Rue Henri Tomasi is named in honour of Henri Tomasi (1901–1971), a French classical composer and conductor born in Marseille.

== Notable residents ==
Jean-Claude Gaudin, who has served as the mayor of Marseille since 1995, was born and grew up in Mazargues.

== Bibliography ==
- Abbé Marius Ganay, La poétique histoire de Mazargues (Marseille: Société nationale des entreprises de presse, 1947).
- Elie Boissin, Le Minot de Mazargues (Paul Keruel/Vauvenargues éditions).
- Elie Boissin, Mystères et Histoires des Calanques (éditions Terradou).
- Evelyne Lyon-Lavaggi, Mazargues, près des calanques (illustrated by J.-P. Lyon, éditions Alan Sutton, 2007).
- Evelyne Lyon-Lavaggi, Dis Papet, raconte-nous Mazargues (illustrated by J.-P. Lyon, éditions Alan Sutton, 2008).
- Evelyne Lyon-Lavaggi, Mazargues ses fourneaux d'Antan (illustrated by J.-P. Lyon, éditions Alan Sutton, 2009).
- Raymond Cresp et Evelyne Lyon-Lavaggi, Mazargues et ses Calanques (Collection Mémoire en Images, éditions Alan Sutton, 2009).

== See also ==
- Ary Bitter
