= Les Chemins invisibles =

Les Chemins Invisibles
- Company: Cirque du Soleil
- Genre: Contemporary circus
- Show type: Seasonal street show
- Date of premiere: June 24, 2009
- Location: Saint-Roch, Quebec City

Creative team
- Director (2009): Julien Gabriel
- Director (2010): Jean-Jacques Pillet
- Director (2011): Olivier Dufour
- Director (2012): Pamela Schneider
- Director (2013): Martin Genest
- Official website

Les Chemins invisibles (Invisible Paths) was a seasonal outdoor show created by Cirque du Soleil that was performed during the summer street events in Quebec City's Saint-Roch district. In 2009, Cirque signed a contract for CA$34,400,000 (equivalent to $49,374,825 in 2025) with the city of Quebec to produce five years of performances during the summer months from 2009 to 2013. The first installment was performed during the summer of 2009. Admission is free and open to the public; the show is presented 5 nights a week for a total of around 50 shows each summer. The show is about three tribes from separate cultures that meet to share one another's experiences. Les Chemins invisibles follows the success of the special show 400e anniversaire de Quebec, which was presented in 2008 for the 400-year anniversary of the city.

== Acts ==
=== Chapter 1: The Enriched Encounter ===
The first chapter of Les Chemins invisibles, performed in 2009, revealed the rich encounter between three tribes (Brumes, Brasiers and Sables) and the embarrassants. The tribes made peace and formed a community in the heart of the Saint-Roch district.

=== Chapter 2: Furrow of Dreams ===
The second chapter, performed in 2010, follows this newly formed community that has turned the Îlot Fleurie park into a place of sharing, harmony and reconciliation. The leaders of the new tribe have gone away with the Embarrassants to show them the world. When they return home, they bring with them a great many wonders. During their return they have a warm homecoming celebration.

=== Chapter 3: Kingdom of Tin ===
In the third chapter, performed in 2011, Le Royaume de Tôle (Kingdom of Tin), the Emperor beckons all to take part in an out-of-the-ordinary urban cabaret.

=== Chapter 4: The Pixel Frontier ===
Performed in 2012, the fourth chapter, The Pixel Frontier saw a child's dreams take the public at sunset on a voyage into the heart of his imaginary world where traditional meets virtual and where the child becomes aware of the beauty of human contact through scintillating exchanges that multiply all around him.

=== Chapter 5: The Harbor of Lost Souls ===
The Harbor of Lost Souls, the fifth and final installment of the series; has the employees of an old customs officer have decided to offer him, for his birthday, a most unforgettable night. In this mysterious realm, the jolly schemers awaken a strange world in which the old man will relive some of the pivotal moments of his long life. In a stream of festive tableaux, the liberating power of memories whisks him away on a journey during which he will discover long forgotten parts of his inner self; ran from June 23 to September 1, 2013, at Quebec City's Port of Quebec Agora.
