= George A. Hardin =

American politician

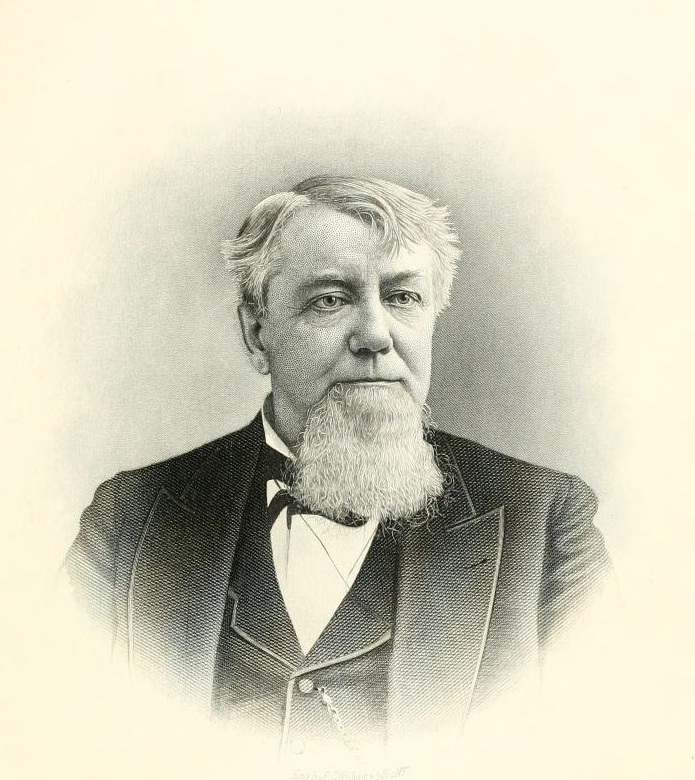
- Hardin, 1893
- Born: George Anson Hardin; August 17, 1832; Winfield, New York
- Died: April 16, 1901 (aged 68); Little Falls, New York
- Occupations: Lawyer, politician

George Anson Hardin (August 17, 1832 – April 16, 1901) was an American lawyer and politician from New York.

== Early life ==
He was born on August 17, 1832, in Winfield, Herkimer County, New York, the son of Col. Joseph Hardin. He graduated from Union College in 1852. Then he studied law, was admitted to the bar in 1854, and practiced in Little Falls.

== Career ==
He was District Attorney of Herkimer County from 1858 to 1861; and a member of the New York State Senate (20th D.) in 1862 and 1863.

He was a justice of the New York Supreme Court from 1872 to 1899. He was assigned to the General Term in 1881; appointed as Presiding Justice of the General Term in 1884; and re-appointed as Presiding Justice of the Appellate Division (4th Dept.) in 1895.

In 1893, he edited a History of Herkimer County, New York (assisted by Frank H. Willard; published by D. Mason & Co., Syracuse NY; 276 pages).

== Death ==
He died on April 16, 1901, in Little Falls, New York.

== Sources ==
- The New York Civil List compiled by Franklin Benjamin Hough, Stephen C. Hutchins and Edgar Albert Werner (1870; pg. 443 and 541)
- Biographical Sketches of the State Officers and the Members of the Legislature of the State of New York in 1862 and '63 by William D. Murphy (1863; pg. 75ff)
- TRIBUTES TO DEAD JURIST RENDERED BY LOCAL JUSTICES in the Syracuse Evening Telegram on April 17, 1901
- DEATH LIST OF A DAY; George A. Hardin in the New York Times on April 17, 1901

New York State Senate
Preceded by Francis M. Rotch	New York State Senate; 20th District; 1862–1863	Succeeded by George H. Andrews
