= Rosh Hashanah (disambiguation) =

Rosh Hashanah is the Jewish new year.

Rosh Hashanah may also refer to:

- Rosh Hashanah (tractate), a tractate of mishnah
- Rosh Hashana kibbutz, a large prayer assemblage of Breslover Hasidim held on Rosh Hashanah

== See also ==
- Christian observances of Jewish holidays § Christian Feast of Trumpets
