= Saint-Roch Church (Quebec City) =

- Église Saint-Roch
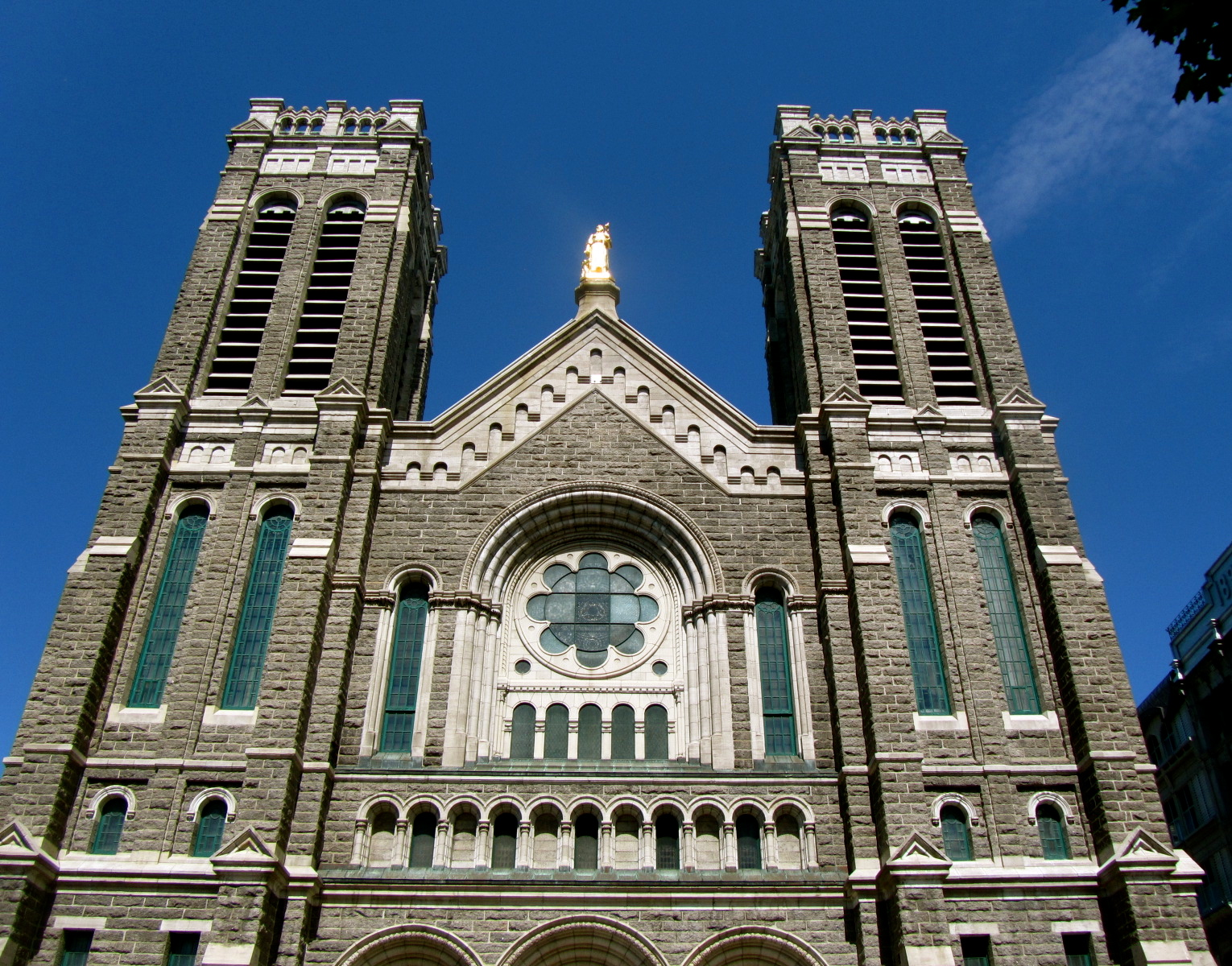

- Location of Saint-Roch Church in Quebec City
- 46°48′49″N 71°12′21″W
- Location: 160, rue Saint-Joseph Est; Quebec City, Quebec; G1K 3A7
- Country: Canada
- Denomination: Catholic Church

History
- Founded: 1811
- Dedication: Saint Roch

Architecture
- Architect: Talbot et Dionne
- Architectural type: Rationalism
- Groundbreaking: 1914
- Completed: 1923

Specifications
- Capacity: 1,250
- Length: 265 ft (81 m)
- Width: 111 ft (34 m)
- Materials: Stone

Administration
- Archdiocese: Roman Catholic Archdiocese of Quebec
- Parish: Notre-Dame-de-Saint-Roch

Clergy
- Archbishop: Gérald Lacroix

The Église Saint-Roch (French pronunciation: [eɡliz sɛ̃ ʁɔk]), in the parish of Notre-Dame de Saint-Roch is the largest church in Quebec City, Quebec, Canada. It was constructed between 1914 and 1923. It is the fourth successive church of the same name to be constructed at the site. The church lost its visual dominance of the city after the construction of a mall in 1974. The mall has since been demolished and today the church is at the heart of the revitalisation of the neighbourhood.

== History of the parish ==
An epidemic hit the colony as the Recollects were building a hermitage which was then dedicated to Saint Roch, a patron saint of ailments, illness and dangers. Saint Roch is also invoked against cholera, epidemics and plague, knee and skin problems, and is invoked to help bachelors, dogs, the falsely-accused, invalids, surgeons, and tile makers.

As the neighbourhood increased in population and activity, a newer, bigger church was needed, one that suited the new centre of Quebec City. The first public worship was held in 1917.

== Previous buildings ==
The first building was built in 1811, and lost to fire in 1816. It was soon rebuilt using the same plans. The parish of Notre-Dame de Saint-Roch was founded in 1829, separating from the parish Notre-Dame de Québec. The interior of the church was fashioned according to plans of Thomas Baillairgé. The building was expanded in 1841, but then burned again in an 1845 fire. The second rebuilding took place between 1845 and 1852.

== Current building ==
The design, by the same architects as the Sainte-Anne-de-Beaupré Basilica, combines a Gothic Revival exterior with a Romanesque Revival interior. The style was inspired by the work of Eugène-Emmanuel Viollet-le-Duc.

The steel-framed building is clad in black granite from nearby Rivière-à-Pierre and has two 45 metre steeples.

The interior is made of Saskatchewan marble that contains visible fossils. Inside is artisanal work, for example fine carpentry and sculpture in the oak furnishing, mosaic in the marble altar, and ironwork. The medieval-style windows show scenes of the New Testament, Old Testament, scenes from the religious history of Quebec, and scenes from the life of Saint Roch. The church contains masterpieces, including the Vision de Saint Roch by Jacques Blanchard, La Sainte Famille pendant la fuite en Égypte by Hyacinthe Collin de Vermont, and two paintings by Antoine Plamondon.

In 2025, the AURA lighting show takes place in the church, done by Moment Factory.

== Gallery ==
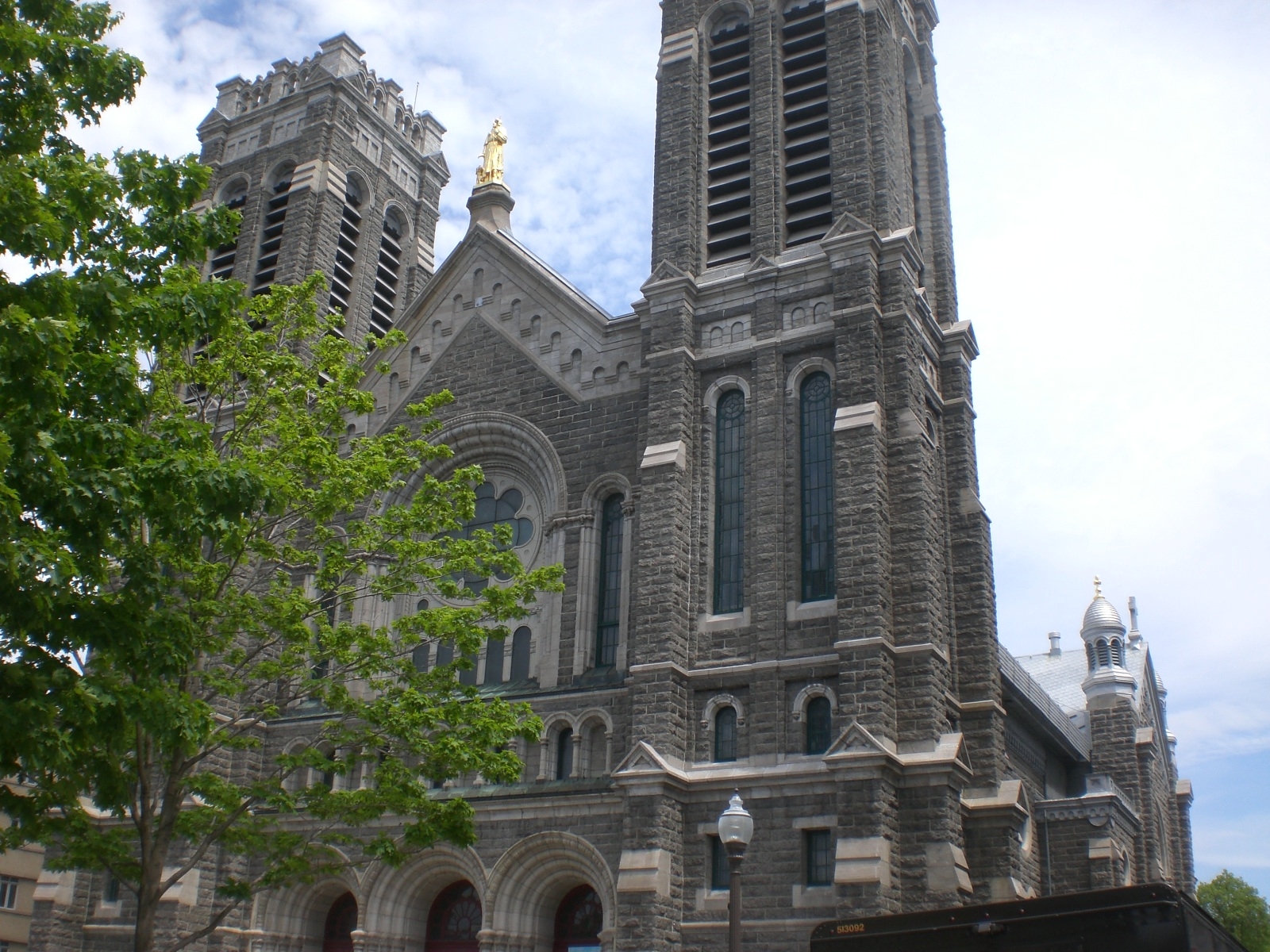
View down Rue Saint-Joseph

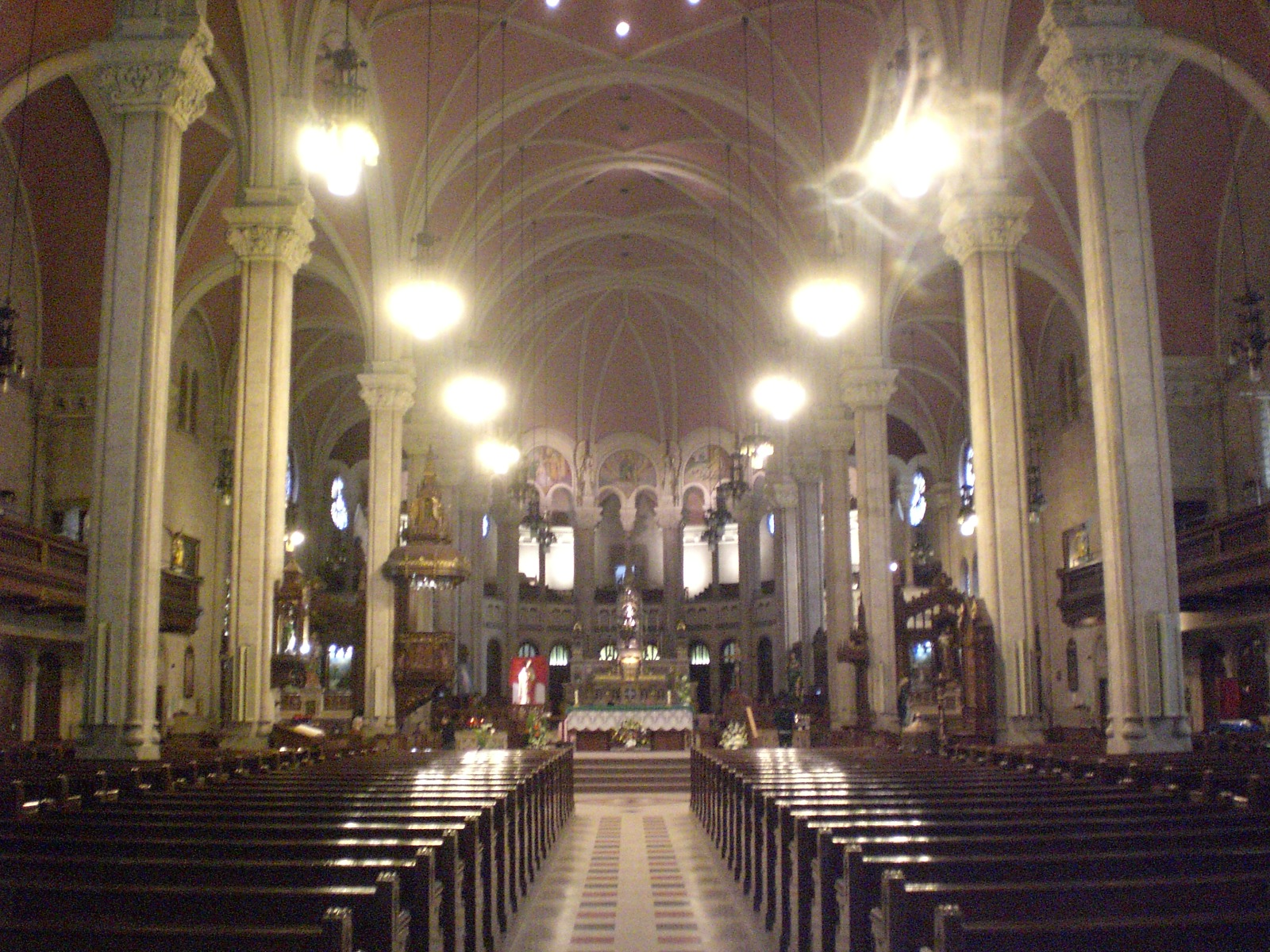
Interior

== See also ==
- Blessed Dina Bélanger
