= Federal Office for the Environment =

Swiss environmental agency

Coordinates: 46°58′25″N 7°28′48″E

- (in German) Bundesamt für Umwelt (in French) Office fédéral de l'environnement (in Italian) Ufficio federale dell'ambiente (in Romansh) Uffizi federal d'ambient

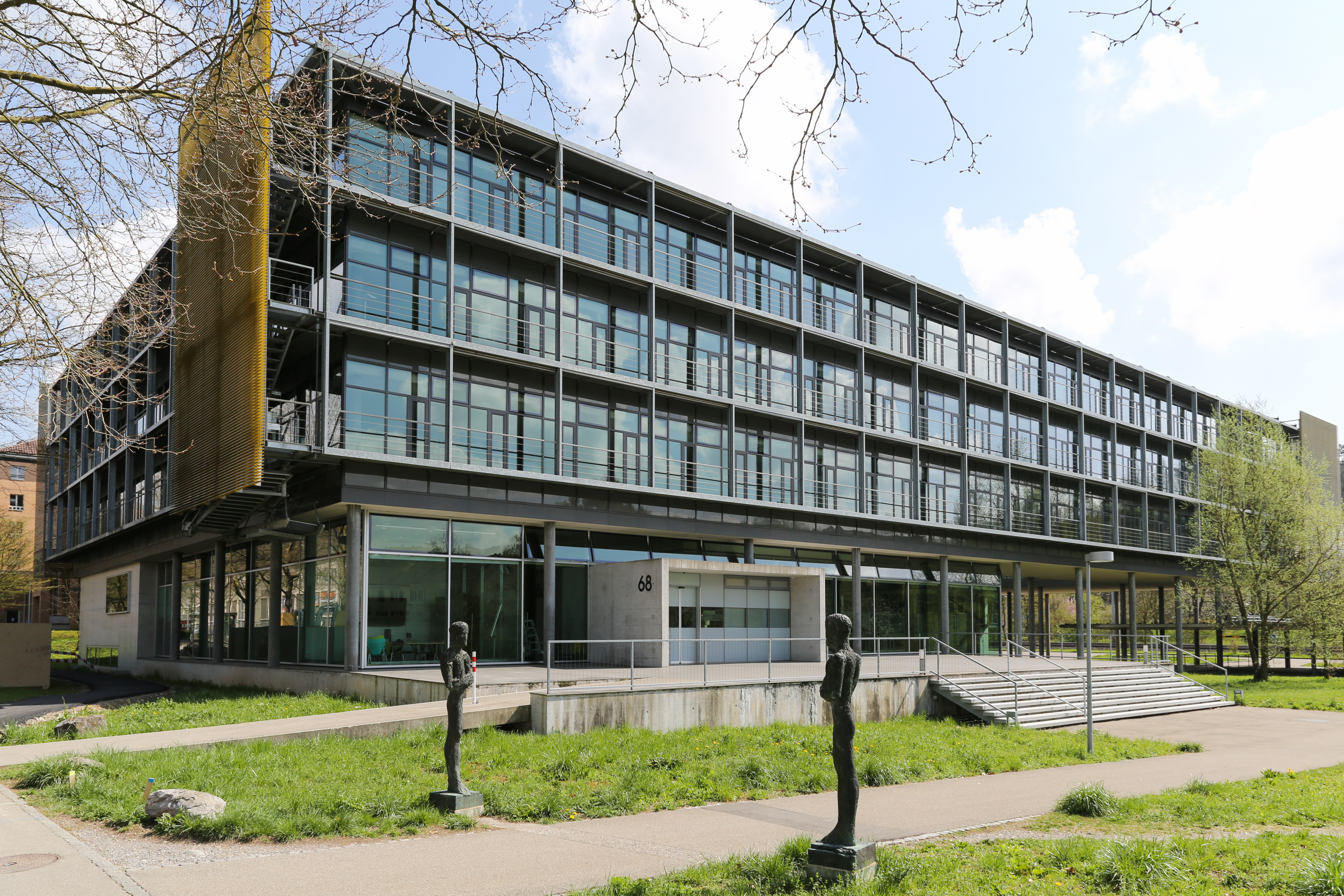
- One of the buildings of the Federal Office for the Environment (Worblentalstrasse 68, Ittigen, 2014)

Agency overview
- Formed: 1971; 55 years ago (renamed in 2006)
- Jurisdiction: Federal administration of Switzerland
- Headquarters: Bern
- Minister responsible: Albert Rösti, Federal Councillor
- Parent agency: Federal Department of Environment, Transport, Energy and Communications
- Website: www.bafu.admin.ch

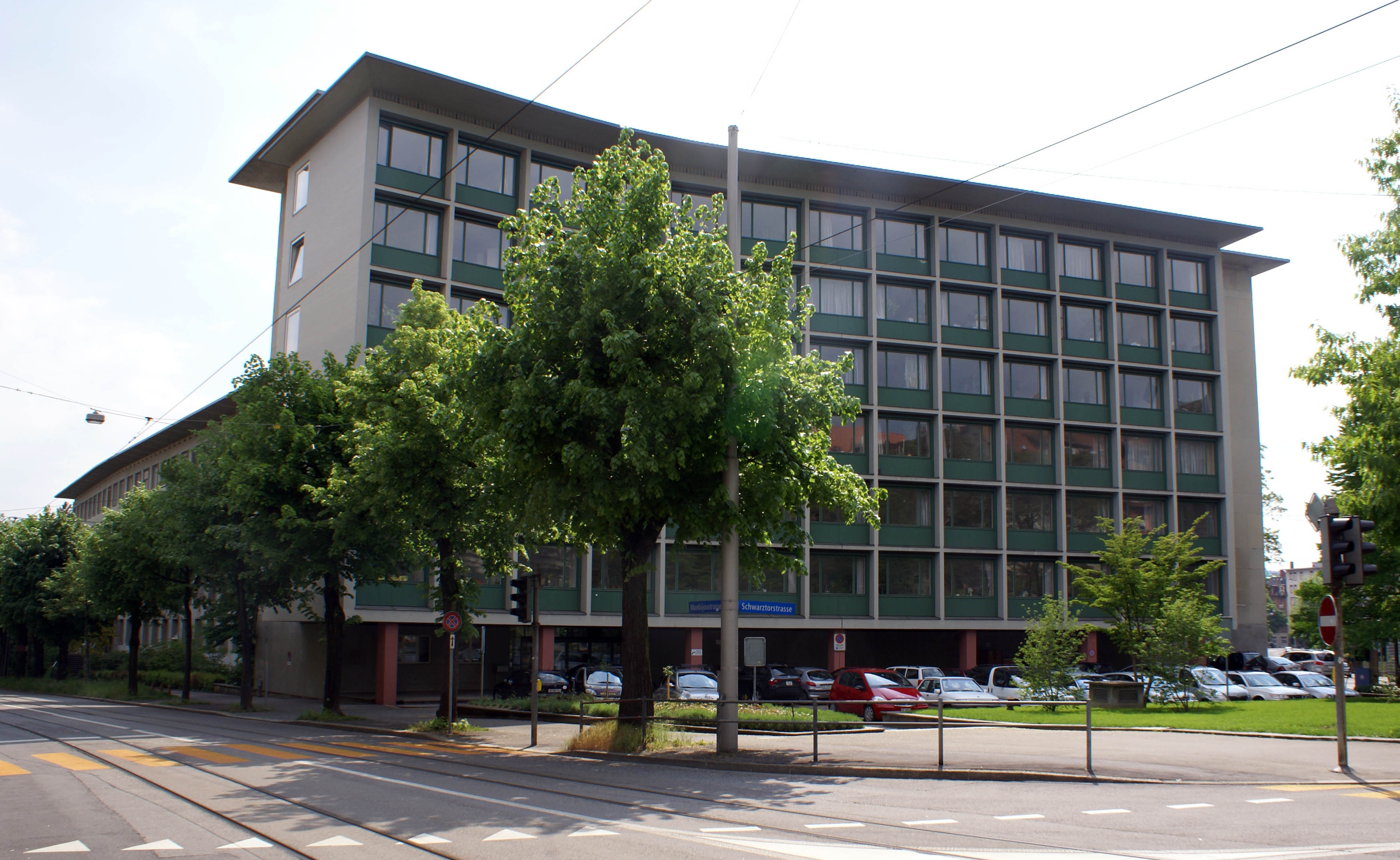
Building at Monbijoustrasse 40, Bern (since 2022)

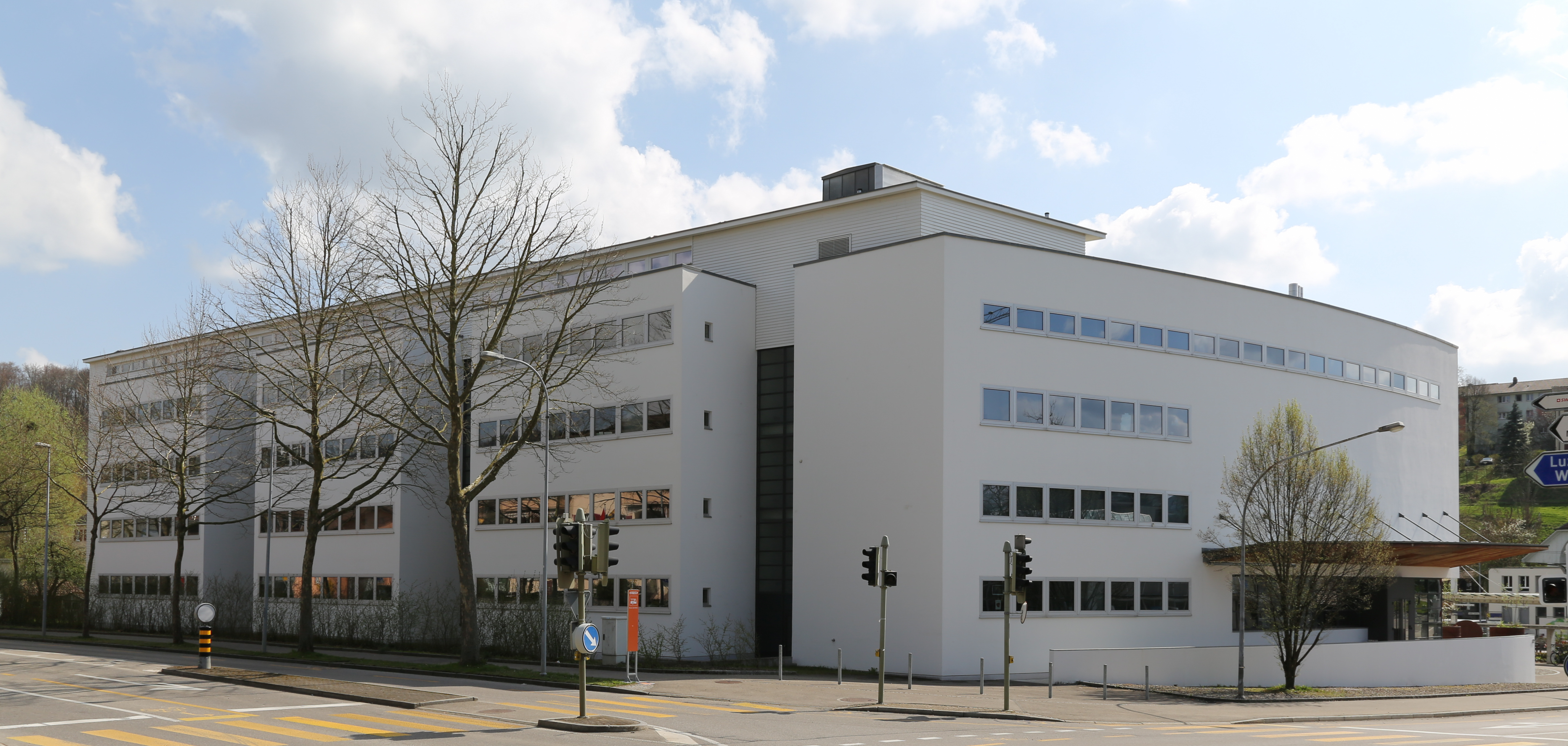
Former building at Papiermühlestrasse 172, Ittigen (until 2022)

The Federal Office for the Environment (Note: German: Bundesamt für Umwelt; French: Office fédéral de l'environnement; Italian: Ufficio federale dell'ambiente) is the Swiss environmental agency, a division of the Federal Department of Environment, Transport, Energy and Communications. It is responsible for matters of the environment, including the protection of plants and animals and the protection against noise, air pollution or natural hazards.

== History ==
The Federal Office for Environmental Protection was founded in 1971. In 1989, it was merged with the Federal Office for Forests and Landscape Protection to form the Swiss Agency for the Environment, Forests and Landscape. In 2006, it was fused with the Federal Office for Water and Geology and renamed Federal Office for the Environment.

== Directors ==
- Katrin Schneeberger (from September 2020)
- Christine Hofmann (Director a.i. from February to August 2020)
- Marc Chardonnens (2016–2020)
- Bruno Oberle (2005–2015)
- Philippe Roch (1992–2005)
- Bruno Böhlen (1985–1992)
- Rodolfo Pedroli (1975–1985)
- Friedrich Baldinger (1971–1975)

== Full-time positions since 2006 ==
Raw data

Source: "Federal Finance Administration FFA: Data portal".

== See also ==
- Environmental movement in Switzerland
- Federal Ethics Committee on Non-Human Biotechnology
- Nature parks in Switzerland
- Waste management in Switzerland
- Biodiversity Monitoring Switzerland
