= St. Roch Church (Greenwich, Connecticut) =

Coordinates: 41°01′04.14″N 73°38′27.42″W

- St. Roch Church
- Location: 10 Saint Roch Ave; Greenwich, Connecticut
- Country: United States
- Denomination: Roman Catholic

Architecture
- Architect: Frank Urso

Administration
- Province: Hartford
- Diocese: Bridgeport

Clergy
- Bishop: Most Rev. William E. Lori

St. Roch is a Roman Catholic church in Greenwich, Connecticut, part of the Diocese of Bridgeport.

Although the Parish of St. Roch was formally established in 1938, it had been preceded by a mission church and it for this mission that the church was built. The large Romanesque Revival stone church was designed by noted architect Frank Urso of Stamford, CT who had designed the Norwalk Hotel in Bridgeport six years earlier. The church was built during the Great Depression and, according to ‘‘One Family in Faith a History of the Diocese of Bridgeport’’, a pastor of that period had acoustical tile installed in the sanctuary to muffle the nickels and dimes that came in for the construction of the church.
