= ROHS (disambiguation) =

RoHS is the Restriction of Hazardous Substances Directive by the European Union.

ROHS may also refer to:

- Red Oak High School (Texas) in Red Oak, Texas, United States
- Royal Oak High School in Royal Oak, Michigan, United States
- China RoHS, the Chinese version of the above Restriction of Hazardous Substances Directive.
