= Saint-Roch, Quebec City =

Neighbourhood in Quebec City, Canada

Coordinates: 46°49′00″N 71°13′40″W

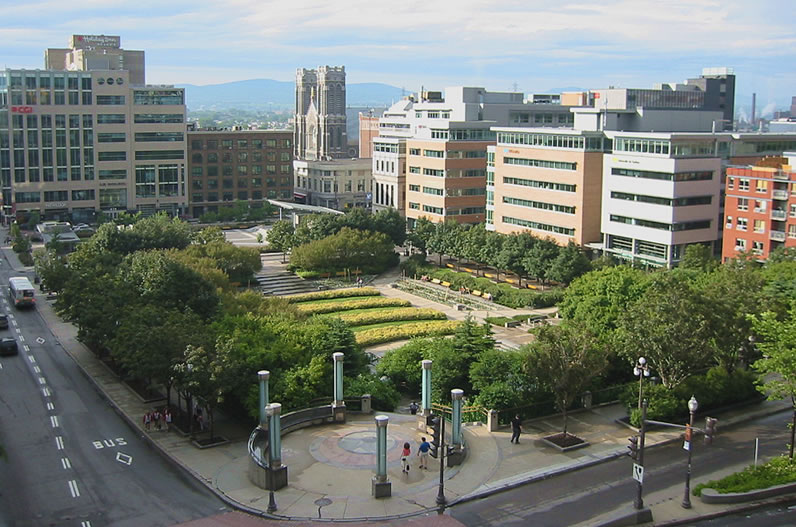
Saint-Roch

Saint-Roch (French pronunciation: [sɛ̃ ʁɔk]) is a downtown neighbourhood in the borough of La Cité in Quebec City, Quebec, Canada. It is the central business district. Once a working-class quarter, some of its parts have been gentrified in recent years.

== History ==
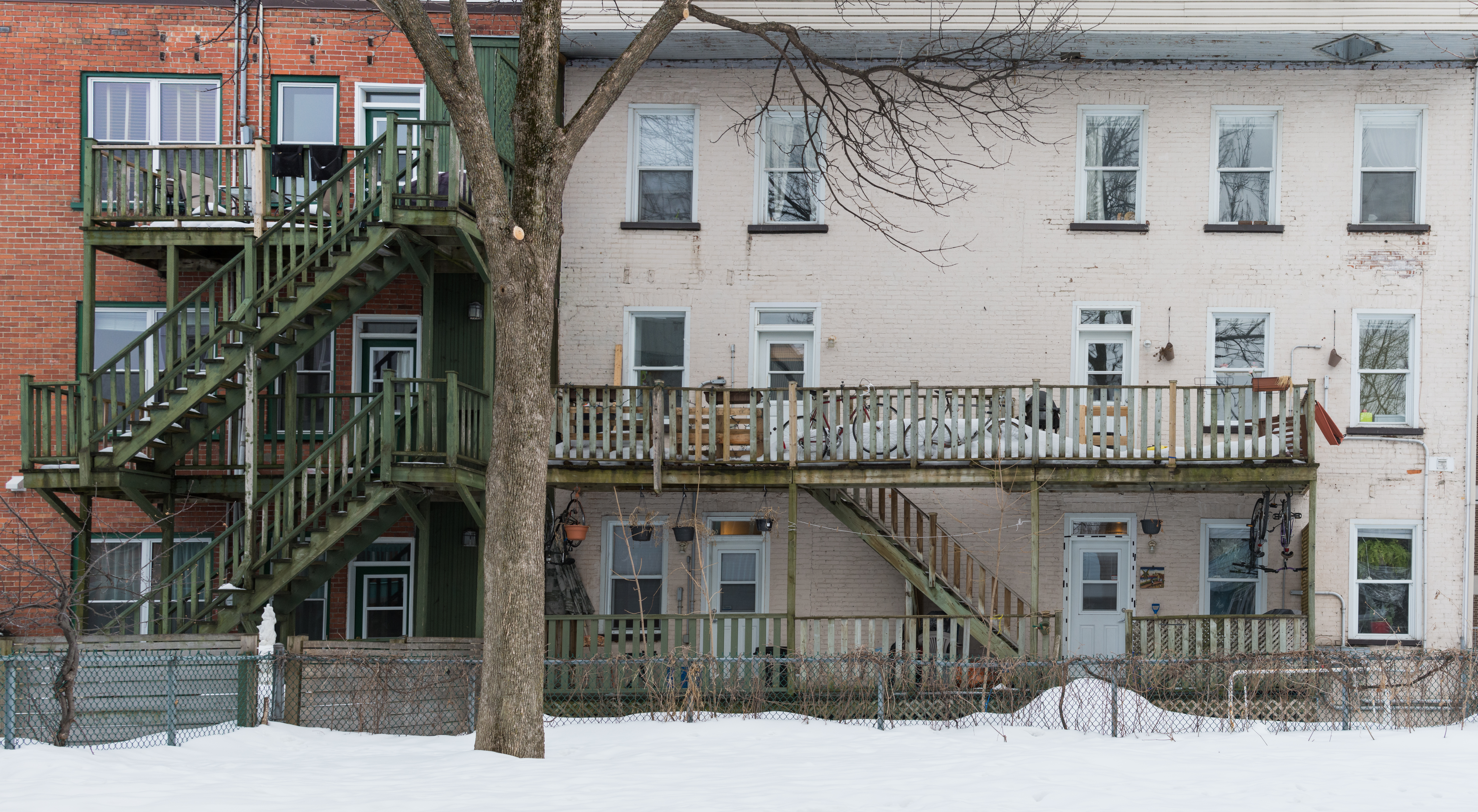
Typical residential backyard architecture.

Saint-Roch was first settled in 1620 by the Recollects, who built a small church dedicated to Saint Roch. Today the Église Saint-Roch is the largest in Quebec City. Later, a few houses were built near what is now the Gare du Palais. In the first half of the 19th century, Saint-Roch was a shipbuilding site. Later, the district saw the development of retail and manufacturing activity. From the mid-19th century to the 1960s, rue Saint-Joseph was the main commercial street in Quebec City. Part of the street was covered with a roof of concrete and plexiglass in 1974. The decision to progressively demolish the roof (and thus the mall) was taken in the 1990s, and the destruction was completed in 2007.

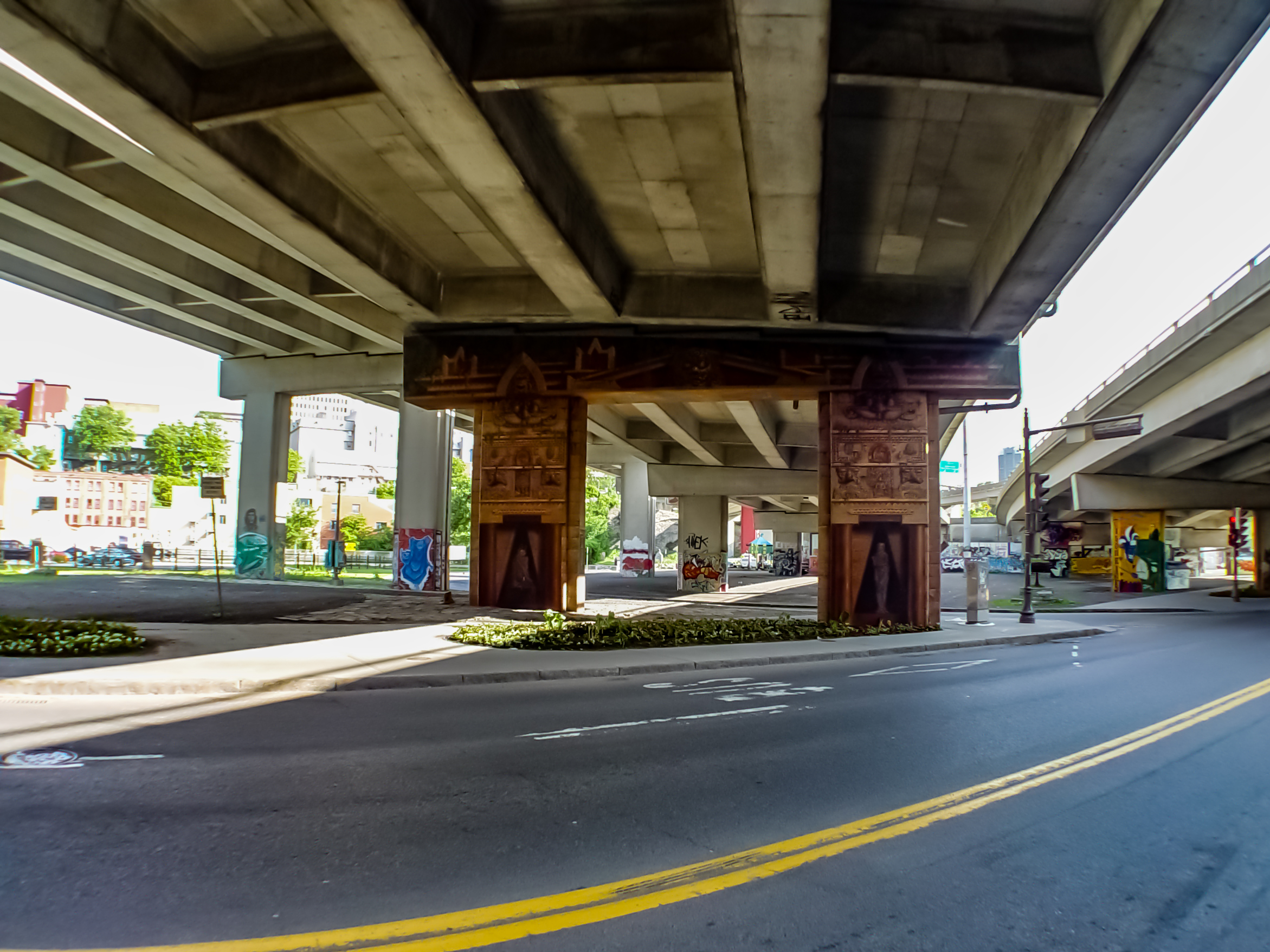
Below the highway overpass in 2004.

During the second half of the 20th century, the district fell into decline and was considered the most deprived in the city. However, Since 2000, $380 million have been invested in the district to renovate and reconstruct most of the buildings in rue Saint-Joseph.

Many working-class residential buildings, representing one tenth of the area of Saint-Roch, were demolished in 1972 to make way for an overpass of highway 440 (Dufferin-Montmorency segment), as a way to accommodate the post-Second World War suburban expansion and automobile use. The empty lot on which the concrete pillars were built was used for public art, and later for illegal graffiti and authorized large-scale trompe-l'œil murals. This unofficial area was called Îlot Fleurie (fr), because of nearby Fleurie street. It was also a socializing place for protesters during the 2001 Summit of the Americas, as well as where the Cirque du Soleil free show Les Chemins invisibles was held in the summers between 2010 and 2012.

== Gallery ==
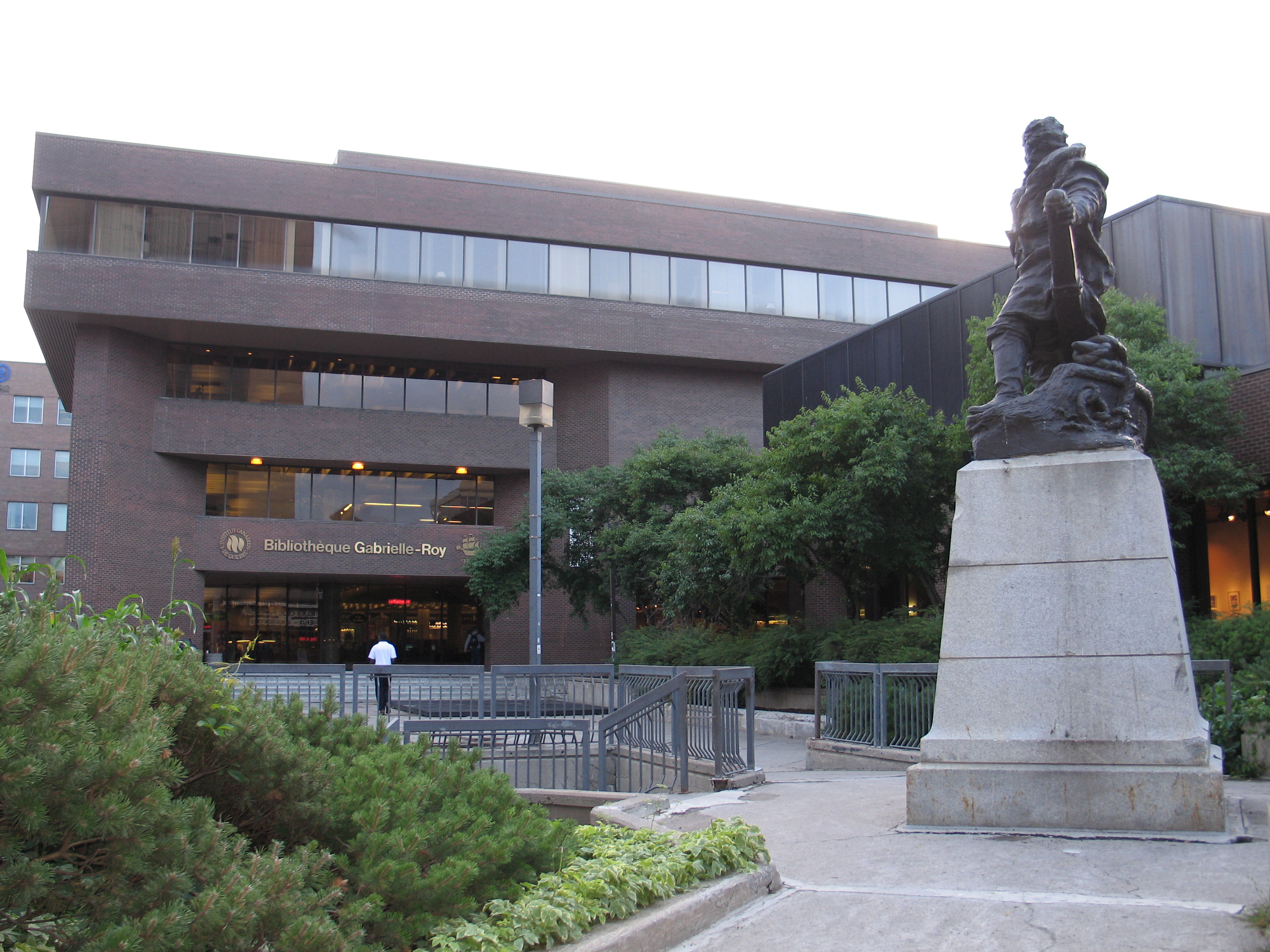
Quebec City's central Gabrielle Roy library.

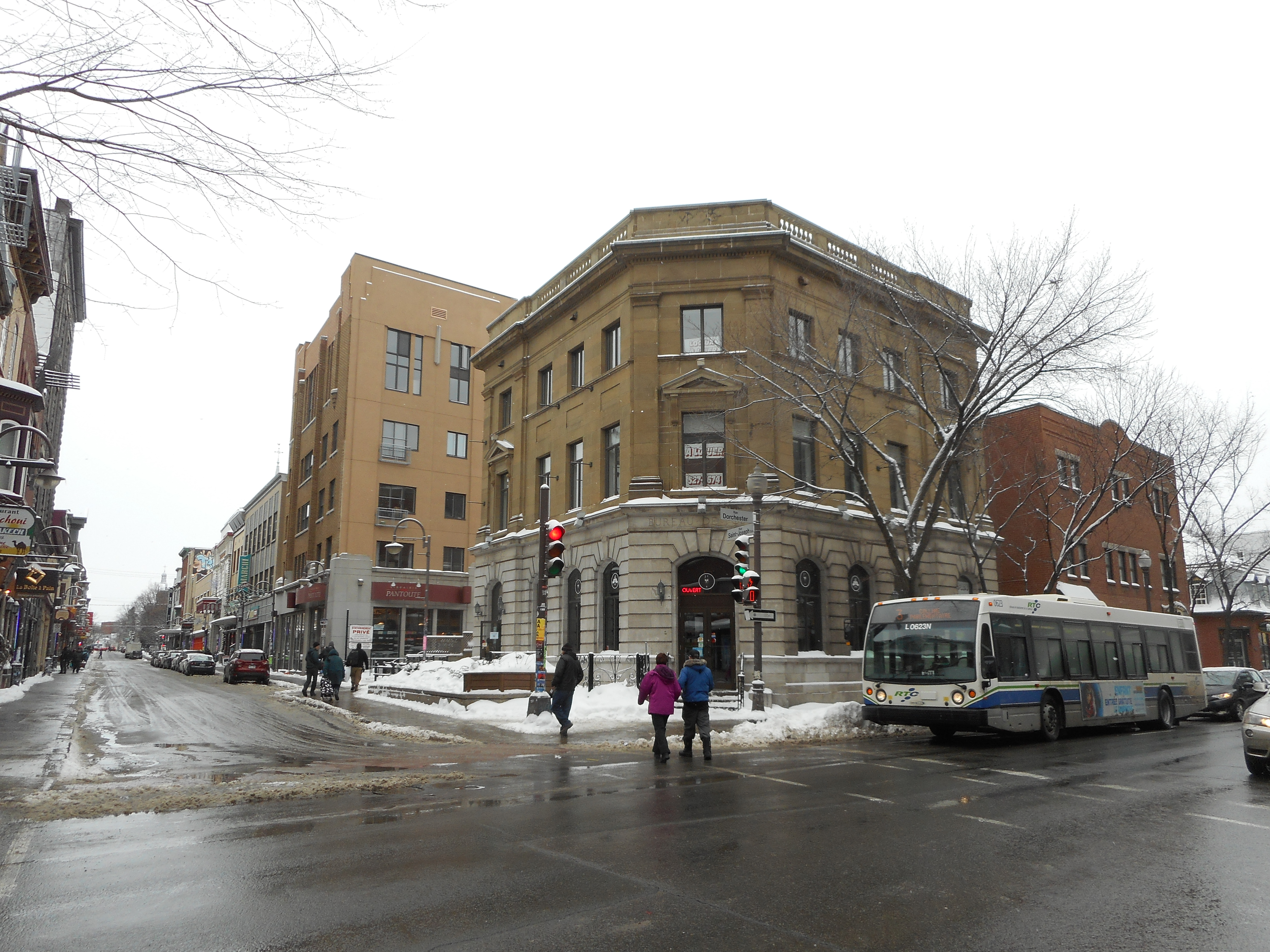
The commercial Saint-Joseph Street.
