= Rais =

Arabic title for chief or leader

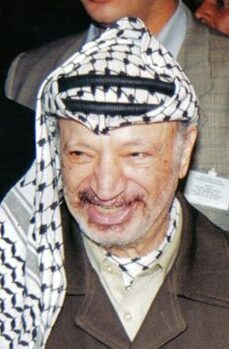
Palestinian leader Yasser Arafat was referred to as the "rais"

Raʾīs (Arabic: رئيس, compare with Amharic Ras or Hebrew Rosh), plural ruʾasāʾ, is an Arabic title meaning 'chief' or 'leader'. It comes from the word for head, raʾs. The corresponding word for leadership or chieftaincy is riʾāsa. It is often translated as 'president' in Arabic, and as 'boss' in Persian. Swahili speakers may also use it for president. The Ottoman Turkish form of the title is reis, which denoted a captain (a term with identical etymology, being from Latin caput, 'head').The term raʾīs is of pre-Islamic origin. It may function as an honorific laqab in a person's name. In the central Arab world, the term originally meant village headman.

== British India ==
In British India the landed nobility in Muslim societies often used the word rais to describe their aristocratic position held in society. The term rais was also often used by Muslims when making deed of endowments in their community. Although the word meant 'chief' or 'leader', legal documents used it in the context of 'landlords' or landowners. Other terms such as malik or zamindar also appeared as 'landlords', ‘landowners, or 'taxers', even though these titles implied that the individual who bore them was more ruler than proprietor.

However, when describing any aspect of the management of their holdings, 'rais or zamindars' employed regal terminology. The rais sat upon a throne (masand or gaddi). Riayat, whom British preferred to call tenants or cultivators were literally subjects. When a rais met with his riayat he described himself as holding court (darbar). The money which riayat paid his lord was tribute (nazrana) not rent. The place where he paid the tribute was called a kachari, just as a government revenue office was, and the clerks who collected, kept accounts and ensured tributes kept coming on time were known by their Mughal courtly styles of (dewans) and (sipahis – a horse trooper).

== Urdu ==
From Arabic, via Persian, this word came into Urdu as raees, which means a person belonging to the aristocracy of noble distinction.

In Urdu, the word Rais is also used similarly to the English term "old money," as the opposite or antonym of nouveau riche, a person who has accumulated considerable wealth within his or her generation.

When the book "The Pleasure of Philosophy" by Will Durant was translated into Urdu, by Syed Abid Ali Abid, he translated the word aristocracy with the Urdu word raisiyyat (رئیسيت).

== Palestine ==
The Arabic adjective azam [ عظيم ] (meaning 'great'), is also added to mean 'the great ra’is'. This term, as well as the Hebrew term יושב-ראש (chairman), are used by Israeli media to refer to the President of the Palestinian National Authority, as opposed to נשיא (president).

In a New York Times op-ed, commentator Bret Stephens referred to late Palestinian leader Yasir Arafat as "the rais."

== Tatarstan ==
In the Republic of Tatarstan (part of Russia), regional lawmakers voted in December 2022 to change the title of the head of the republic from president to rais (tt. Рәис/ Rəis). The title of president was seen as the last remaining symbol of federalism following the centralization reforms under Vladimir Putin.
