= Philippe Roch =

Swiss civil servant

- Born: 13 September 1949 (age 75); Lancy (Switzerland)
- Known for: Director of the Swiss section of the World Wide Fund for Nature; Director of the Swiss Agency for the Environment, Forests and Landscape

Philippe Roch (born 13 September 1949 in Lancy) is a retired Swiss civil servant.

== Biography ==
Philippe Roch obtained a PhD in biochemistry from the University of Geneva in 1977. He was elected deputy of the Christian Democratic People's Party of Switzerland at the Grand Council of Geneva (1973–1982).

He was director of the Swiss section of the World Wide Fund for Nature (1977–1992). After that, Roch was appointed Director of the Swiss Agency for the Environment, Forests and Landscape (SAEFL) by the Federal Council. He occupied this position for 13 years, from 1992 until he resigned on 1 October 2005.

He was member of the board of directors of the Global Environment Facility, of the United Nations Institute for Training and Research and of the United Nations Environment Programme.

Philippe Roch chaired the conference of the parties of the Basel Convention (1999–2002) and of the Rotterdam Convention (2004–2005). In 2008, he received an honorary degree from the University of Lausanne.
