= Rivière des Roches (Saint-Augustin-de-Desmaures) =

Watercourse in Portneuf, Québec, Canada

- Location within Quebec

Location
- Country: Canada
- Province: Quebec
- Region: Capitale-Nationale
- Regional County Municipality: Portneuf Regional County Municipality
- Municipality: Saint-Augustin-de-Desmaures

Physical characteristics
- Source: Forest stream
  - location: Saint-Augustin-de-Desmaures
  - coordinates: 46.74931°N 71.54648°W
  - elevation: 117
- Mouth: St. Lawrence River
  - location: Saint-Augustin-de-Desmaures
  - coordinates: 46.72083°N 71.49861°W
  - elevation: 4 m
- Length: 9.6 km (6.0 mi)

Basin features
- Tributaries
  - left: Unidentified stream
  - right: Ruisseau Dorval

The Rivière des Roches is a tributary of the northwest shore of the St. Lawrence River, flowing in the municipality of Saint-Augustin-de-Desmaures, in the Portneuf Regional County Municipality, in the administrative region of Capitale-Nationale, in the province of Quebec, in Canada.

The Roches river valley is mainly served by the route 138, chemin du Roy, chemin du 3e rang and chemin du Cabouron, notably for the needs of agriculture and of forestry, are the two main economic activities in this area.

The surface of the Rivière des Roches (except the rapids areas) is generally frozen from the beginning of December to the end of March; safe circulation on the ice is generally done from the end of December to the beginning of March. The water level of the river varies with the seasons and the precipitation; the spring flood occurs in March or April.

== Geography ==
The Roches River has its source in a forest area in Saint-Augustin-de-Desmaures, almost at the limit of Neuville, north of the village of Saint-Nicolas. This source is located 0.2 kilometres (0.12 mi) north of the Canadian National railway, 8.0 kilometres (5.0 mi) west of the village center of Saint-Augustin-de- Desmaures, 1.3 kilometres (0.81 mi) northwest of autoroute 400, 4.6 kilometres (2.9 mi) northwest of the St. Lawrence River, 5.9 kilometres (3.7 mi) northwest of its mouth.

From its source, the Roches River then flows over a distance of 9.6 kilometres (6.0 mi), with a drop in level of 13 metres (43 ft), according to the following segments:

- 3.5 kilometres (2.2 mi) towards the east by forming a progressive curve towards the south, in forest area and by crossing the railway of Canadian National, then entering agricultural area until the highway 40;
- 1.3 kilometres (0.81 mi) northeasterly along the south side of highway 40, to Dorval stream (coming from the north), corresponding to a bend in the river;
- 2.0 kilometres (1.2 mi) to the south in agricultural area, by crossing the Canadian Pacific railway, to Route 138;
- 2.8 kilometres (1.7 mi) towards the south-east by crossing the Cascade des Roches, crossing the Chemin du Roy and bending towards the east, to its mouth.

The confluence of the Roches River and the Saint-Laurent River flows into the Saint-Laurent downstream of the Dombourg islets. This confluence is located 16.1 kilometres (10.0 mi) southwest of the Pierre Laporte Bridge, 3.4 kilometres (2.1 mi) southwest of the center of Saint-Augustin-de-Desmaures.

== Toponymy ==
The toponym "Rivière des Roches" originates from the habit of residents of the area to designate it because of its rocky bed, just like sixty other similar entities across Quebec. It has also been known under the names Ruisseau Dorval and Rivière des Rouches. It is from this that the Desroches family, whose ancestor was called Tinon, then Tinon Des Roches, took its nickname.

The toponym "Rivière des Roches" was formalized on December 5, 1968 at the Commission de toponymie du Québec.

== Appendices ==
=== Related articles ===
- Portneuf Regional County Municipality
- Saint-Augustin-de-Desmaures
- List of rivers of Quebec
