= Saint-Roch-Ouest =

- Municipality
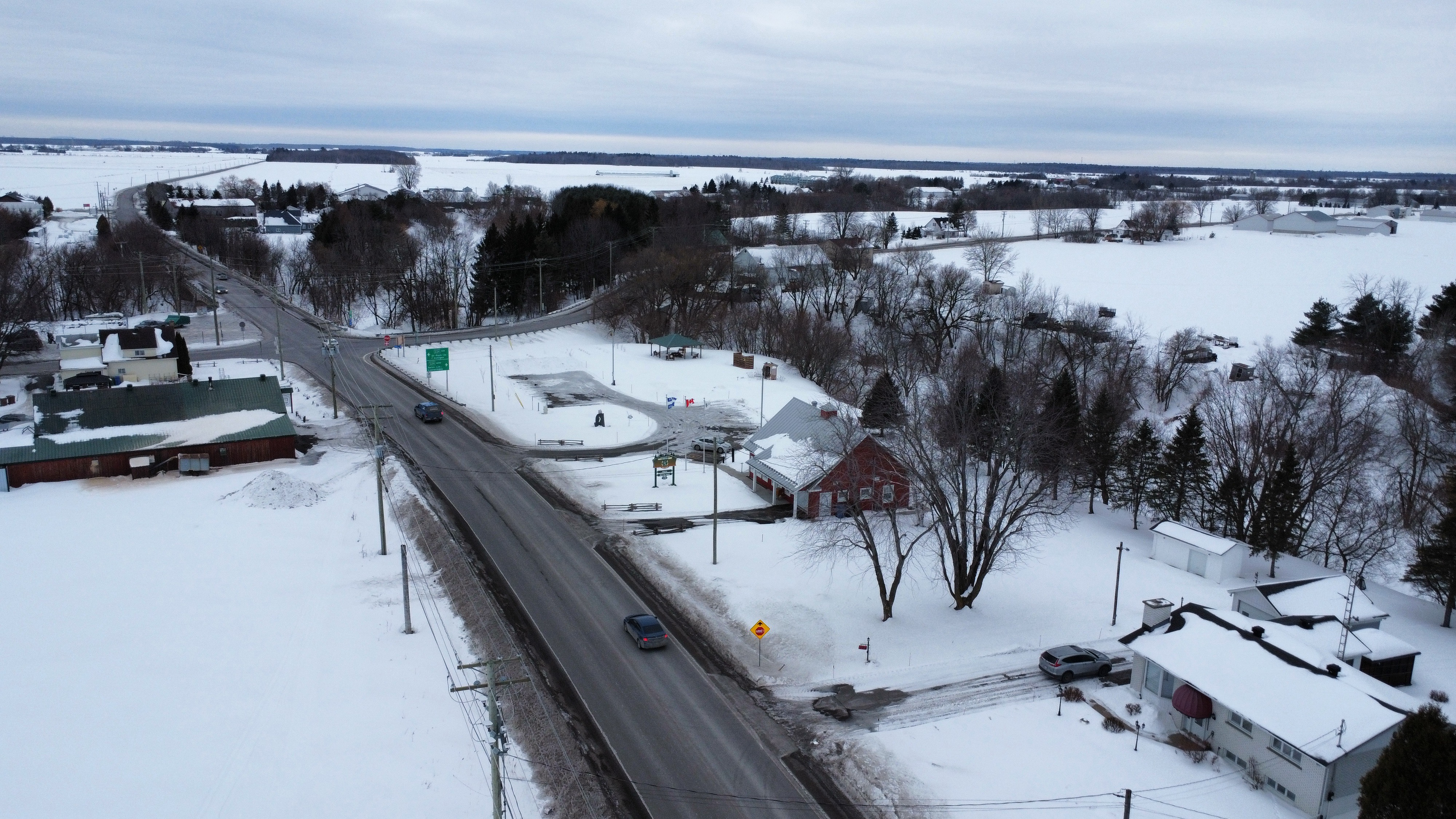

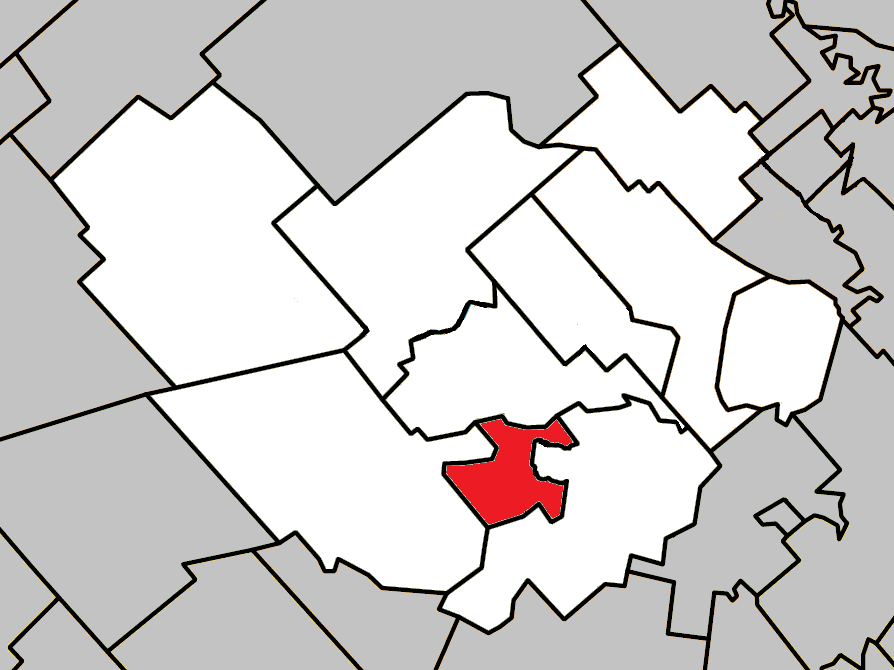
- Location within Montcalm RCM

- Location in central Quebec
- Coordinates: 45°51′N 73°39′W
- Country: Canada
- Province: Quebec
- Region: Lanaudière
- RCM: Montcalm
- Settled: 1780s
- Constituted: June 4, 1921

Government
  - Mayor: Pierre Mercier
  - Fed. riding: Montcalm
  - Prov. riding: Rousseau

Area
  - Total: 20.09 km^{2} (7.76 sq mi)
  - Land: 20.14 km^{2} (7.78 sq mi)
- There is an apparent discrepancy between 2 authoritative sources.

Population (2021)
  - Total: 262
  - Density: 13/km^{2} (34/sq mi)
  - Pop (2016–21): ▼1.5%
  - Dwellings: 99
- Time zone: UTC−5 (EST)
  - Summer (DST): UTC−4 (EDT)
- Postal code(s): J0K 3H0
- Area codes: 450, 579
- Highways A-25: R-125; R-158; R-339
- Website: saint-roch-ouest.ca

Saint-Roch-Ouest (French pronunciation: [sɛ̃ ʁɔk wɛst]) is a municipality in Montcalm Regional County Municipality in the Lanaudière region of Quebec, Canada. Ouest, French for "west", indicates its position in relation to Saint-Roch-de-l'Achigan.

== History ==
Saint-Roch-Ouest was formed in 1921 when it separated from the Parish Municipality of Saint-Roch.

== Demographics ==
Historical census populations – Saint-Roch-Ouest

Year	Pop.	±%
1931	333	—
1941	352	+5.7%
1951	398	+13.1%
1956	403	+1.3%
1961	427	+6.0%
1966	406	−4.9%
1971	377	−7.1%
1976	381	+1.1%
1981	390	+2.4%

Year	Pop.	±%
1986	383	−1.8%
1991	357	−6.8%
1996	350	−2.0%
2001	310	−11.4%
2006	285	−8.1%
2011	267	−6.3%
2016	266	−0.4%
2021	262	−1.5%

Population counts are not adjusted for boundary changes.
Source: Statistics Canada

Private dwellings occupied by usual residents (2021): 95 (total dwellings: 99)

Mother tongue (2021):

- English as first language: 0%
- French as first language: 96.2%
- English and French as first languages: 1.9%
- Other as first language: 0%

== Economy ==
The relatively rich soils encouraged agricultural activity all throughout its history and Saint-Roch-Ouest has retained agriculture as the most important economic sector. All land of the municipality is occupied by agricultural activity, in particular vegetable production and the cultivation of cereals. Additionally, there are also pork breeders and dairy farms.

== Education ==
The Sir Wilfrid Laurier School Board (SWLSB) is the third-largest anglophone school board in Quebec, delivering English-language instruction across the Laval, Lanaudière, and Laurentides regions. For residents of Saint-Roch-Ouest eligible for English-language education, the SWLSB operates two schools in the Lanaudière area:

- Joliette Elementary School, situated in Saint-Charles-Borromée, serves the English-speaking community across northern Lanaudière. The school draws students from dozens of surrounding municipalities within an 85-kilometre radius.
- Joliette High School, located in Joliette at 107, rue de Lorimier, is the anglophone secondary school for the Lanaudière region. It enrolls approximately 290 students from twenty-seven municipalities spread across the region.

French-language public education in the Montcalm RCM is administered by the Centre de services scolaire des Samares, which provides schooling services across the four Lanaudière MRCs of D'Autray, Joliette, Matawinie, and Montcalm.
