= Église Saint Roch, Marseille =

Church in Marseille, France

Coordinates: 43.2459°N 5.4041°E

Église de Mazargues
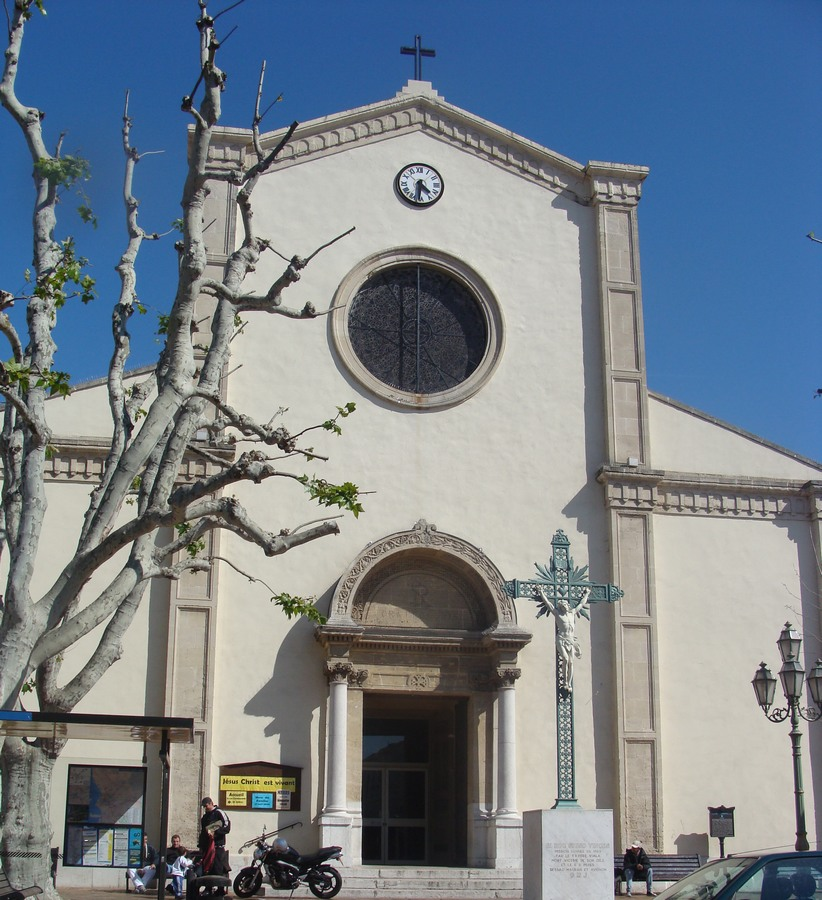
- Église Saint Roch

Religion
- Affiliation: Catholic Church
- Province: Roman Catholic Archdiocese of Marseille
- Region: Provence-Alpes-Côte d'Azur
- Status: Active

Location
- Location: Place Saint Roch, 13009 Marseille, France
- State: France
- Interactive map of Église de Mazargues

Architecture
- Architect: Pascal Coste
- Type: Church
- Groundbreaking: 1845
- Completed: 1851

Website
- www.eglisedemazargues.fr

The Église Saint Roch, better known as Église de Mazargues is a Roman Catholic parish church in Mazargues, 9th arrondissement, Marseille, France.
