= Francis J. Rotch =

American politician (1863–1918)

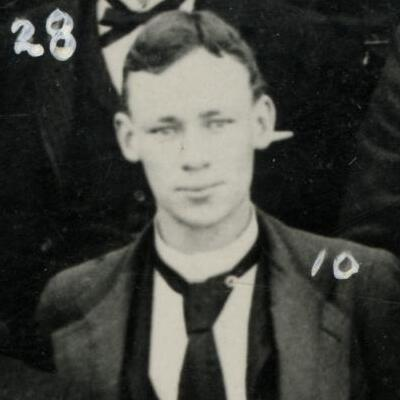
- Rotch in 1889

Member of the Washington House of Representatives
- In office 1889–1891

Personal details
- Born: February 15, 1863 Albany, New York, United States
- Died: May 25, 1918 (aged 55) Honolulu, Hawaii Territory, United States
- Party: Republican

Francis J. Rotch (February 15, 1863 – May 25, 1918) was an American politician in the state of Washington. He served in the Washington House of Representatives from 1889 to 1891.
