= Francis M. Rotch =

American politician

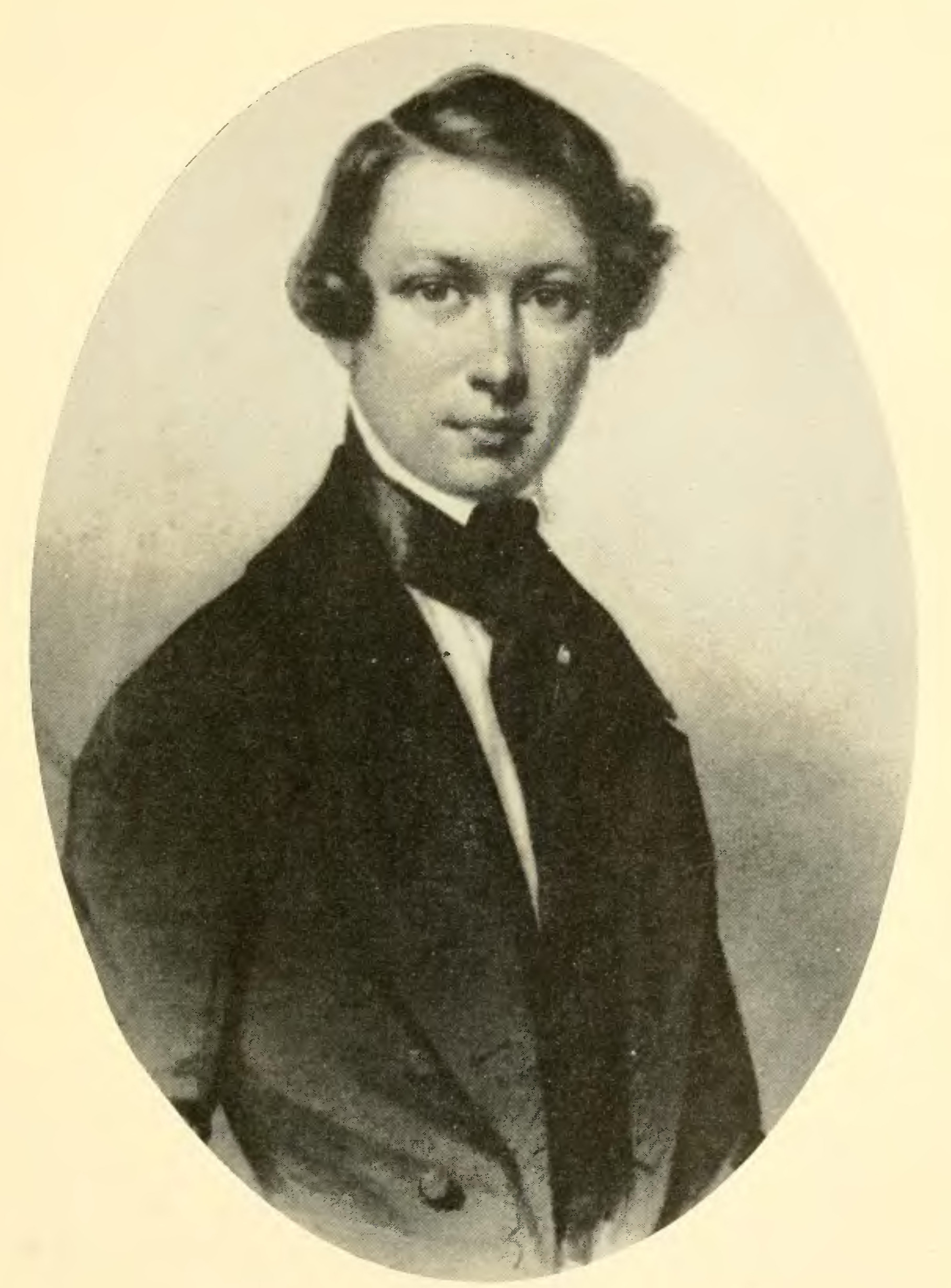
- Born: 20 February 1822; New Bedford
- Died: 28 November 1863 (aged 41); Morris
- Resting place: Hillington Cemetery
- Alma mater: Harvard University
- Parent(s): Francis Rotch
- Position held: member of the State Senate of New York

Francis Morgan Rotch (February 20, 1822 in New Bedford, Bristol County, Massachusetts – November 28, 1863 in Morris, Otsego County, New York) was an American politician from New York.

== Life ==
He was the son of Francis Rotch (1788–1874) and Ann Wain (Morgan) Rotch (1800–1884). In 1831, the family removed to Morris. He graduated from Harvard College in 1841. From 1843 to 1846, he traveled around Europe. Afterwards, he engaged in agricultural pursuits. He was a member of the New York State Senate (20th D.) in 1860 and 1861.

On February 12, 1862, he was appointed by Gov. Edwin D. Morgan as one of his aides-de-camp with the rank of colonel. On May 6, 1862, Rotch married Catherine W. Gilbert, and their only child was Francis Rotch (1863–1918). While on official business with the New York regiments of the Army of the Potomac, he contracted a fever in the swamps near Yorktown, Virginia. After lingering on for a few months, he died suddenly at his home and was buried at the Hillington Cemetery in Morris.

His great-granduncle Francis Rotch owned the vessel Dartmouth, one of three from which the tea was thrown overboard during the Boston Tea Party in 1773.

== Sources ==
- The New York Civil List compiled by Franklin Benjamin Hough, Stephen C. Hutchins and Edgar Albert Werner (1867; pg. 442)
- Biographical Sketches of the State Officers and Members of the Legislature of the State of New York by William D. Murphy (1861; pg. 111ff)
- The Rotches by John Morgan Bullard
- Death of Col. Francis M. Rotch in NYT on December 5, 1863

New York State Senate
Preceded by Addison H. Laflin	New York State Senate; 20th District; 1860–1861	Succeeded by George A. Hardin
