= Saint-Alexis, Quebec =

Saint-Alexis
- Municipality
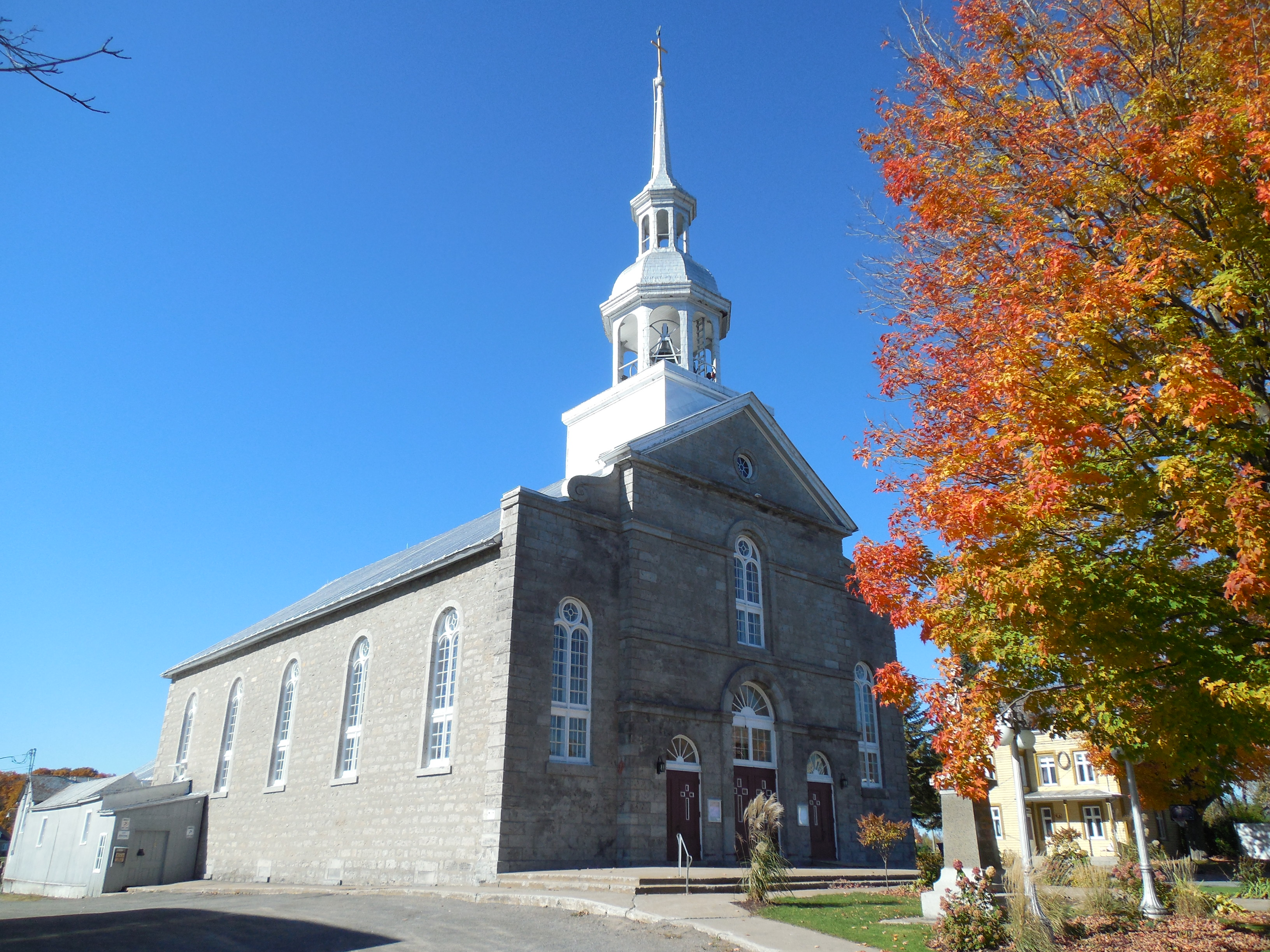
- Church of Saint-Alexis

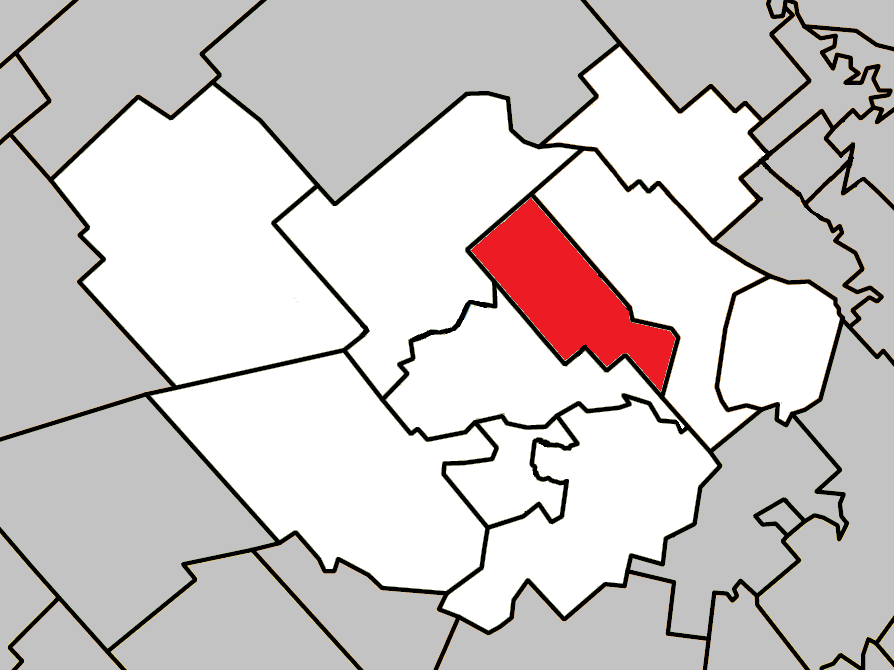
- Location within Montcalm RCM

- Location in central Quebec
- Coordinates: 45°56′N 73°37′W
- Country: Canada
- Province: Quebec
- Region: Lanaudière
- RCM: Montcalm
- Founded: 1855
- Constituted: December 19, 2012
- Named for: Alexis-Frédéric Truteau

Government
  - Mayor: Michel Ricard
  - Fed. riding: Montcalm
  - Prov. riding: Rousseau

Area
  - Total: 43.15 km^{2} (16.66 sq mi)
  - Land: 43.01 km^{2} (16.61 sq mi)

Population (2021)
  - Total: 1,370
  - Density: 31.9/km^{2} (83/sq mi)
  - Pop 2016-2021: ▲4.7%
  - Dwellings: 581
- Time zone: UTC−5 (EST)
  - Summer (DST): UTC−4 (EDT)
- Postal code(s): J0K 1T0
- Area codes: 450, 579
- Highways: R-158
- Website: st-alexis.com

Saint-Alexis (French pronunciation: [sɛ̃t‿alɛksi]) is a municipality located in Quebec's Lanaudière region, part of the Montcalm Regional County Municipality, Canada. It was formed by the amalgamation on December 19, 2012, of the former village municipality and the former parish municipality of the same name. Saint-Alexis is generally considered one of the four municipalities of Nouvelle-Acadie.

The name "Saint-Alexis" commemorates Canon Alexis-Frédéric Truteau (1808-1872). The latter was ordained in 1830 and occupied the post of Chancellor of the Bishop of Montreal, Mgr Ignace Bourget, during the creation of the canonical erection of the parish, in 1851. Truteau became famous during the “Guibord case”, when he refused Christian burial to Joseph Guibord following a Roman decree obtained by the bishop condemning the Canadian Institute.

== History ==
The parish of Saint-Alexis was created on July 1, 1855, after the dissolution of the county of Leinster (which covered the territory approximately equivalent to the RCMs of Montcalm, Les Moulins and L'Assomption) in the highlands of the plain of Saint-Laurent, about twenty kilometres north of Saint-Roch-de-l'Achigan, in the Lanaudière region.

The chosen name, Saint-Alexis, also attributed to the post office established in 1855, which took the name of "Saint-Alexis-de-Montcalm" in 1876, pays homage to Canon Alexis-Frédéric Truteau (1808-1872).

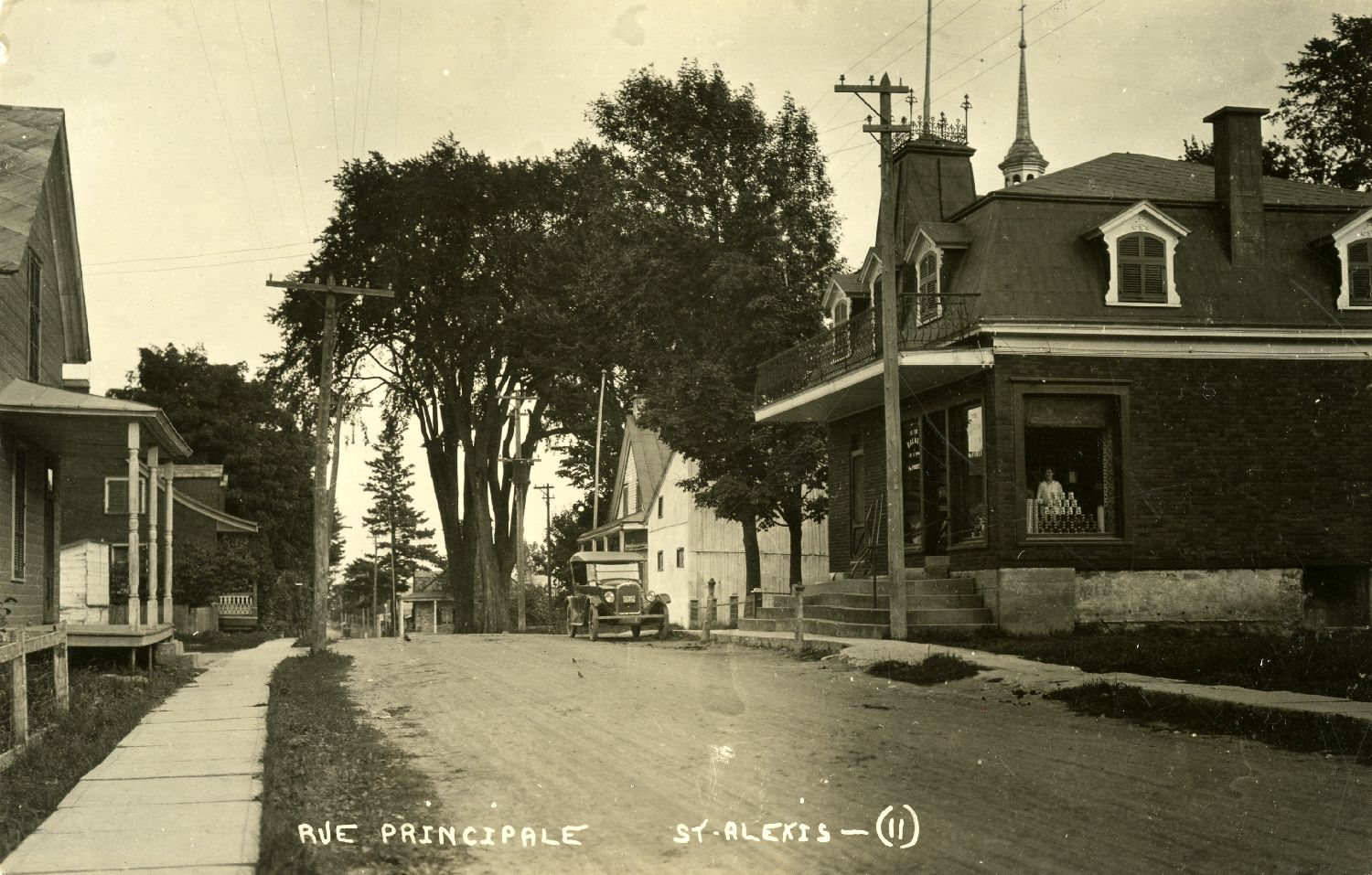
Saint-Alexis in 1930

The latter, ordained in 1830 by Monsignor Jean-Jacques Lartigue, served as Chancellor of Monsignor Ignace Bourget from 1847 to 1872, and he set the boundaries of the parish in 1852. Nicknamed the good Father Truteau, he became famous because of his role in the Guibord affair. He refused, in fact, the Christian burial of Joseph Guibord, dit Archambault (1809-1869) because of a Roman decree obtained by Monsignor Bourget against the Canadian Institute to which Guibord belonged. A decision by Judge Mondelet in 1870 forced Father Rousselot and the churchwardens of Notre-Dame-de-la-Montréal as well as Canon Truteau to reconsider their decision and allow the transfer of Guibord's remains to the Catholic cemetery of the Côte-des-Neiges. Acadians settled on the territory around 1795, coming from L'Assomption, through a large number of small hills. In 1920 the village part of Saint-Alexis split from the parish to form its own municipal entity. On December 19, 2012, the parish municipality of Saint-Alexis and the village municipality of Saint-Alexis remerged to become the municipality of Saint-Alexis. Nowadays, magnificent maple groves make Saint-Alexis famous.

The municipality forms, with the neighbouring municipalities of Saint-Jacques, Sainte-Marie-Salomé and Saint-Liguori, the region of New Acadie, where many Acadians settled in the 18th century in the aftermath of the expulsion of the Acadians. The Acadian Festival of New Acadie is celebrated there every year.

== Geography ==
The village is crossed by Route 158 between the municipalities of Saint-Jacques on the east and Saint-Esprit on the west. Saint-Alexis is 20.7 km from Saint-Lin-Laurentides and 27.3 km from Mascouche.

Saint-Alexis is located on the upper St. Lawrence plain. The area is known for the fertility of its soil, which is especially suited to market gardening and grain crops. The forested areas consist almost entirely of maple, making this the perfect place to shop for maple-based products.

The two major roads are called Grande-Ligne and Petite-Ligne and houses a number of ancestral homes that were built facing south, a local characteristic. These houses reflect a heritage that is typical of Lanaudière.

== Demographics ==
In the 2021 Census of Population conducted by Statistics Canada, Saint-Alexis had a population of 1,370 living in 554 of its 581 total private dwellings, a change of 4.7% from its 2016 population of 1,308. With a land area of 43.01 km^{2} (16.61 sq mi), it had a population density of 31.9/km^{2} (82.5/sq mi) in 2021.

Historical census populations – Saint-Alexis Municipality
Year	Pop.	±%
2016	1,308	—
2021	1,370	+4.7%
Source: Statistics Canada

Private dwellings occupied by usual residents (2021): 554 (total dwellings: 581)

Mother tongue (2021):

- English as first language: 1.5%
- French as first language: 96.0%
- English and French as first languages: 0.7%
- Other as first language: 1.5%

== Economy ==
Saint-Alexis is a predominantly rural town, where large cereal and market gardening farms are located, which represents approximately 92% of its territory. There are also farms producing pork, dairy, poultry and maple syrup production accompanied by its commercial sugar shack.

== Government ==
List of former mayors of current municipality:

- Robert Perreault (2012–2021)
- Michel Ricard (2021–present)

== Education ==
Commission scolaire des Samares operates francophone public schools, including:

- École Notre-Dame

The Sir Wilfrid Laurier School Board operates anglophone public schools, including:

- Joliette Elementary School in Saint-Charles-Borromée
- Joliette High School in Joliette
