= Charles Daoust =

Canadian lawyer, journalist and political figure

Charles Daoust (January 23, 1825 – February 27, 1868) was a lawyer, journalist and political figure in Canada East.

He was born in Beauharnois, Lower Canada, in 1825, the son of a farmer, and studied at the Collège Saint-Pierre at Chambly. He originally planned to become a priest but later articled in law with Lewis Thomas Drummond at Montreal and was called to the bar in 1847. During his time in Montreal, he contributed to the newspaper L'Avenir. He then set up his law practice at Beauharnois. Daoust returned to journalism, as editor for Le Pays from 1853 to 1859 and again from 1864 to 1865. In 1854, he was elected to the Legislative Assembly of the Province of Canada for Beauharnois. Daoust supported Joseph Papin's proposal for a school system not based on religious affiliations, a viewpoint opposed by the clergy in the province. He was defeated in the general elections held in 1858 and 1861. In 1856, he married his cousin Angèle Doutre. In 1859, he returned to the practice of law, in partnership with his cousins/brothers-in-law, Joseph and Gonzalve Doutre. Daoust was a member of the Institut canadien de Montréal and served as its president in 1860. He was opposed to Confederation, because he felt it would diminish the importance of the province's elected representatives.

He died of tuberculosis at Montreal in 1868.
