= Institut canadien =

Institut canadien may refer to:

- Institut canadien de Montréal
- Institut canadien de Québec
