= Montreal County (Province of Canada electoral district) =

Electoral district in former Province of Canada

Province of Canada electoral district

Defunct pre-Confederation electoral district
- Legislature: Legislative Assembly of the Province of Canada
- District created: 1841
- District abolished: 1854
- First contested: 1841
- Last contested: 1851

Montreal County was an electoral district of the Legislative Assembly of the Parliament of the Province of Canada, in Canada East. It was created in 1841 and was partially based on the previous electoral district of the same name for the former Legislative Assembly of Lower Canada. However, a significant part of the old district was carved out of it and formed the new electoral district of Montreal, a linguistic and ethnic gerrymander designed to gain support for the new Province of Canada, which had resulted from the merger of Lower Canada and Upper Canada.

The new Montreal County was represented by one member in the Legislative Assembly. The electoral district was abolished in 1854, when it was split into two new districts, Hochelaga and Jacques-Cartier.

== Boundaries ==
Montreal County was located on the Island of Montreal, and included areas not included in the electoral district for the city of Montreal. The Montreal County district initially included a significant portion of the city, as a result of the boundaries drawn by the Governor General, Lord Sydenham, as part of his goal to increase the voting strength of voters of British background, at the expense of the francophone Canadiens.

The Union Act, 1840 merged the two provinces of Lower Canada and Upper Canada into the Province of Canada, with a single Parliament. The separate parliaments of Lower Canada and Upper Canada were abolished.

The Union Act provided that the pre-existing electoral boundaries of Lower Canada and Upper Canada would continue to be used in the new Parliament, unless altered by the Union Act itself. The Montreal County electoral district of Lower Canada had included all of the Island of Montreal. The Union Act did not directly change the boundaries of Montreal County, but did so in an indirect way.

The Union Act created a new electoral district of Montreal, and gave the Governor General the power to draw the boundaries for that new district. Any parts of the city which were not included in the new district would be included in the adjoining district, namely Montreal County. Governor General Sydenham was determined to ensure that candidates who favoured the recent union of Lower Canada and Upper Canada would be elected to the Legislative Assembly. As part of his plan to ensure that goal, he drew the boundaries of the new Montreal district to favour the voters of British background, who generally favoured the union, and to exclude francophone Canadien voters, who generally opposed the union. The result was an ethnic and linguistic gerrymander, which effectively disenfranchised francophone some of the voters of Montreal in the 1841 election.

== Members of the Legislative Assembly (1841–1854) ==
Montreal County was a single-member district, represented by one member in the Legislative Assembly.

The following were the members of the Legislative Assembly for Montreal County. The party affiliations are based on the biographies of individual members given by the National Assembly of Quebec, as well as votes in the Legislative Assembly. "Party" was a fluid concept, especially during the early years of the Province of Canada.

| Parliament | Members | Years in Office | Party |
|---|---|---|---|
| 1st Parliament; 1841–1844 | Alexandre-Maurice Delisle (Note: Seat vacated on being appointed Clerk of the Crown, an office of profit under the Crown, July 13, 1843: Côté, Political Appointments and Elections, p. 59, note (22).) | 1841–1843 | Unionist; Tory |
| 1st Parliament; 1841–1844 | André Jobin (Note: Elected in by-election, October 26, 1843: Côté, Political Appointments and Elections, p. 59, note (23).) | 1843–1844 (by-election) | French-Canadian Group |
| 2nd Parliament; 1844–1847 | André Jobin | 1844–1851 | French-Canadian Group |
| 3rd Parliament; 1848–1851 | André Jobin | 1844–1851 | French-Canadian Group |
| 4th Parliament; 1851–1854 | Michel-François Valois | 1851–1854 | Rouge |

== Abolition ==
Montreal County was abolished by a redistribution statute enacted in 1853, which took effect in the next general elections in 1854. It was split into two new ridings, Hochelaga and Jacques-Cartier. The new ridings did not include any portions of the city of Montreal, ending the Sydenham gerrymander.

== See also ==
- List of elections in the Province of Canada
