= André Jobin =

Lower Canada notary and politician

Member of the Legislative Assembly of Lower Canada for Montreal County
- In office 1835–1838 (by-election)
- Preceded by: Louis-Joseph Papineau
- Succeeded by: None; Constitution suspended

Member of the Legislative Assembly of the Province of Canada for Montreal County
- In office 1843–1851 (1 by-election and 2 general elections)
- Preceded by: Alexandre-Maurice Delisle
- Succeeded by: Michel-François Valois

Personal details
- Born: August 8, 1786 Montreal, Province of Quebec
- Died: October 11, 1853 (aged 67) Sainte-Geneviève, Canada East, Province of Canada
- Party: Lower Canada: Parti canadien, Parti patriote Province of Canada: French-Canadian Group
- Spouses: (1) Marie-Joseph Baudry (m. May 16, 1808); (2) Marie Archambault (m. April 22, 1816); (3) Émilie Masson (m. February 16, 1824; her death, March 27, 1838); (4) Marie-Élize Dorval (m. May 27, 1839)
- Children: Several
- Education: Collège Saint-Raphaël
- Profession: Notary

Military service
- Allegiance: Britain
- Branch/service: Province of Canada militia
- Years of service: 1847–1853
- Rank: Lieutenant colonel

André Jobin (August 8, 1786 – October 11, 1853) was a notary and political figure in Lower Canada and Canada East.

== Family and early life ==
Jobin was born in 1786 in Montreal, in the old Province of Quebec. His parents were François Jobin and Angélique Sarrère, dit La Victoire. He studied at the Collège Saint-Raphaël in Montreal, then articled at law. Jobin qualified as a notary in 1813 and set up practice, originally in Montreal, later in Sainte-Geneviève on the island of Montreal.

Jobin gradually built up an extensive notarial practice, initially with a clientele drawn from labourers and artisans, often doing agreements between masters and journeymen. He also drew up agreements for the substitution of military service. By 1820 he was averaging more than one deed a day, and had expanded his practice to include merchants, builders, and real estate speculators. His deeds were carefully written with clear details. In 1834 he published an accurate map of the city of Montreal and the Island of Montreal.

Jobin was married four times. He had several children from his various marriages.

== Lower Canada politics ==
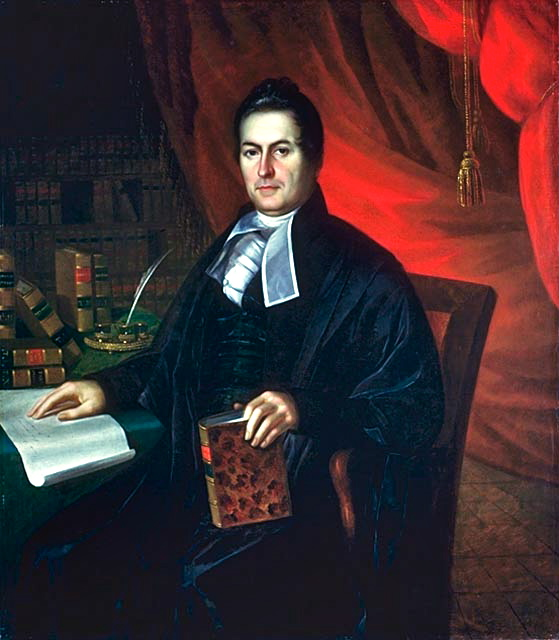
Louis-Joseph Papineau, leader of the Patriote movement

Jobin was a follower of the Parti canadien (later called the Parti patriote), the party in the Legislative Assembly of Lower Canada which represented the French-Canadians in Lower Canada. The party was regularly involved in political conflicts with the governors to obtain greater popular control of the colonial government. Jobin was a strong supporter of Louis-Joseph Papineau, who became the main leader of the party. By the late 1820s, Jobin was a prominent member of the Patriote movement in Montreal. In 1828, when the Legislative Assembly sent a delegation to London to explain their grievances to the British government, Jobin was elected to a party committee which drafted the instructions for the delegation.

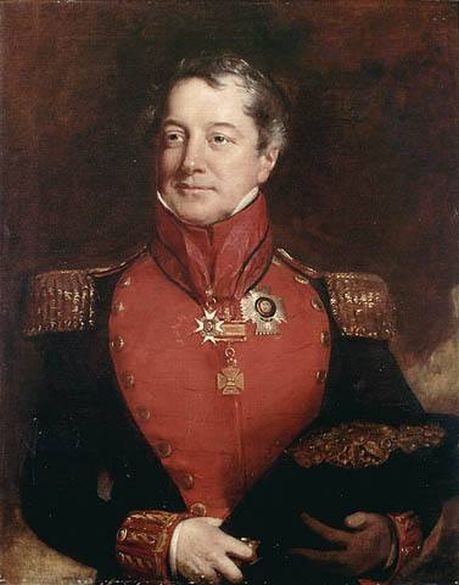
Governor Aylmer, who cancelled Jobin's commission as a Justice of the Peace

Jobin was appointed a justice of the peace in 1830 but continued to be involved in politics. In May 1832, riots broke out in Montreal at the election of Daniel Tracey, a Patriote candidate. Jobin was one of three justices of the peace who refused to issue an order authorising the use of the military to suppress the riots. Other justices of the peace signed the order, and British troops were called out. Three of Tracey's supporters were shot dead. Jobin attended the funerals of the three Patriotes, and assisted another justice of the peace in gathering evidence which led to the arrest of the commanding officer. In November 1832, he was elected to a committee which protested the events. Based on this political activity, Governor Lord Aylmer cancelled his commission as justice of the peace.

In 1834, Jobin moved to Sainte-Geneviève, then a rural village on the Island of Montreal. He was part of a political committee in the village which organised local support for the Ninety-Two Resolutions, passed by the Legislative Assembly in February 1834. The Resolutions were highly critical of the colonial government and called for significant constitutional changes. The next year, Jobin was elected to the Legislative Assembly as the member for Montreal County in a by-election. He succeeded Papineau as the member, Papineau having been elected in a Montreal riding. In the Assembly, Jobin was a reliable supporter of Papineau.

Early in 1837, the new Governor, Lord Gosford, restored Jobin's commission as a justice of the peace.

== Lower Canada Rebellion ==
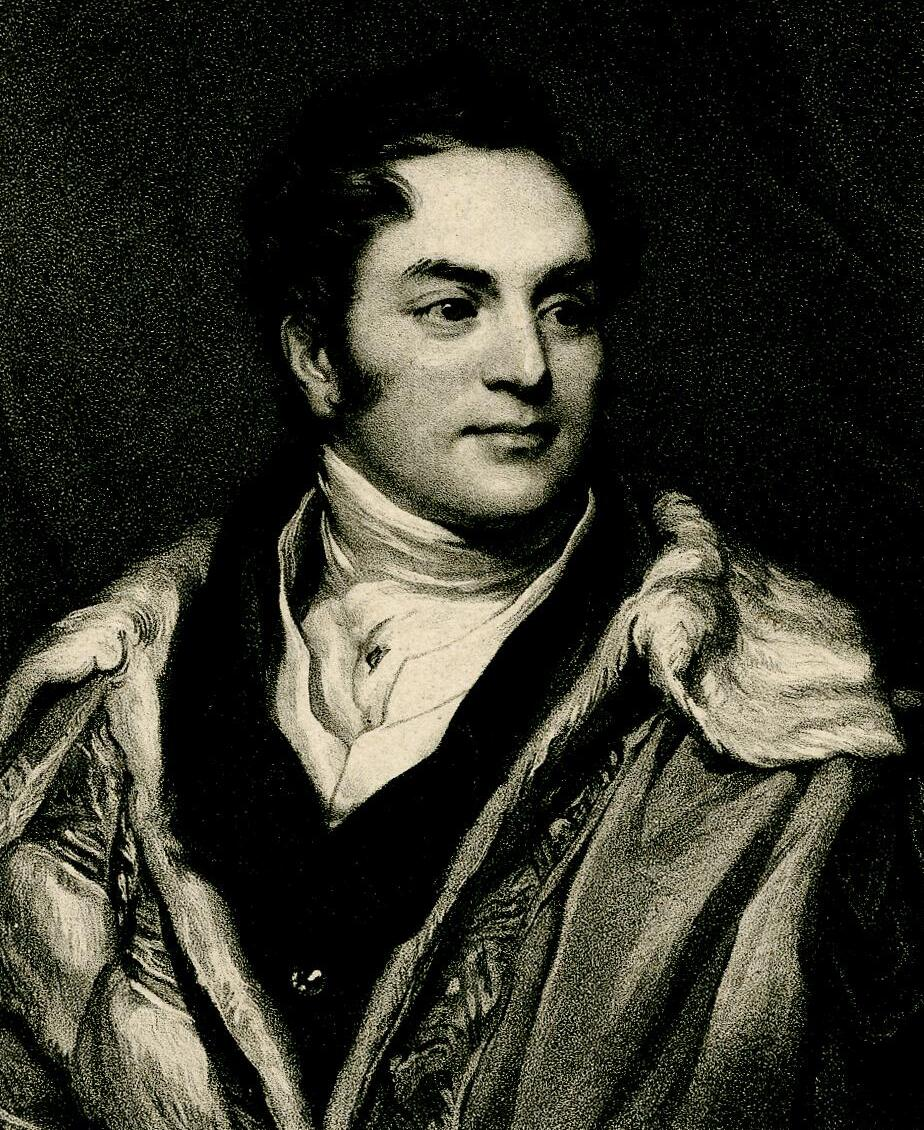
Governor General Lord Gosford, the target of Jobin's criticism

In March 1837, the British House of Commons passed the Russell Resolutions, rejecting the changes requested in the Ninety-Two Resolutions. From that point on, the possibility of a rebellion grew, as peaceful constitutional change appeared to have been rejected. Jobin was heavily involved in preparations aimed at garnering popular support for the Patriote movement. He was one of the speakers at a major public rally in Montreal in May 1837, and moved a resolution criticising Governor Gosford for taking coercive measures. He was a member of the Comité Central et Permanent du District de Montréal, which directed Patriote popular opposition to the government throughout the Montreal area.

In August 1837 Jobin resigned his recently restored commission as a justice of the peace, saying that it lacked any meaning since it had not been given to him by the people. In his resignation letter, he set out his reasons:

The sacrifice of my commission as a justice of the peace is too small a thing to be weighed against my most sacred right as a British subject (to discuss peacefully measures of interest to his country). I gladly renounce my commission . . . to preserve the title of free man."

His resignation letter was published with approval by the Patriote newspapers.

On the outbreak of the Lower Canada Rebellion in November 1837, Jobin went into hiding, as the government began to issue warrants for the arrest of Patriote leaders and proclaimed martial law in the Montreal district. He remained in hiding for five months. During this time, amid rumours that the military would burn their house, his wife Émilie made efforts to preserve their assets by forced sales. The stress of events may have contributed to her death in March 1838. When the government ended martial law in April 1838, Jobin came out of hiding. He was arrested in May 1838 and charged with seditious practices, but he was never tried. He was released in July 1838, on a bond of £1,000. During his imprisonment, he prepared a detailed plan of the Montreal prison.

In response to the Rebellion, the British government passed an act of Parliament, suspending the constitution of Lower Canada, and replacing it with an appointed Special Council. Jobin lost his seat in the Assembly as a result.

Jobin continued his criticism of the government. In 1840, as agent for the Sulpician order in Montreal, he made a trip to St. Benoît, north of Montreal, to organise resistance to the government's plans to gradually disestablish the Sulpicians' extensive land-holdings. He made a fiery speech, strongly critical of the government:

... the government would deprive you of your rights, your religion and your priests, you have already been burned and pillaged and they are not content with that, they still want to seize the seigneuries ... and take your farms from you."

When one magistrate alleged that the speech was seditious, Jobin made some attempt to deny having made it.

== Province of Canada politics ==
=== Union of the Canadas, 1841 ===
Following the rebellion in Lower Canada, and the similar rebellion in 1837 in Upper Canada (now Ontario), the British government decided to merge the two provinces into a single province, as recommended by Lord Durham in the Durham Report. The Union Act, 1840, passed by the British Parliament, abolished the two provinces and their separate parliaments. It created the Province of Canada, with a single Parliament for the entire province, composed of an elected Legislative Assembly and an appointed Legislative Council. The Governor General initially retained a strong position in the government.

In the first general elections in 1841, Jobin was a candidate in the Vaudreuil constituency, campaigning against the union. The supporters of his opponent, John Simpson, used intimidation to discourage Jobin's supporters, and at one point Jobin had to jump out of a window to avoid being assaulted. He was defeated and Simpson was elected. Electoral violence of this sort was not uncommons in Canadian elections in the mid-19th century.

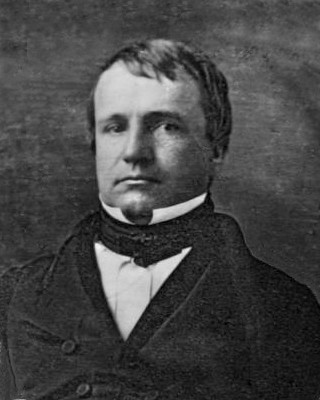
Louis-Hippolyte LaFontaine, leader of the French-Canadian Group

Two years later, in 1843, the sitting member for Montreal County, Alexandre-Maurice Delisle, resigned to take a civil service position. Jobin was elected in the resulting by-election. He became a member of the French-Canadian Group in the Assembly, led by Louis-Hippolyte LaFontaine. Jobin was elected in time to take part in the major issue at the end of the 1843 session, when the members of the ministry led by LaFontaine and Robert Baldwin from Upper Canada resigned in protest at Governor General Metcalfe's refusal to take advice from the ministry over certain appointments. The Legislative Assembly passed a resolution condemning the Governor General and supporting the position taken by LaFontaine and Baldwin. Jobin voted in favour of the resolution.

=== The 1844 Elections ===
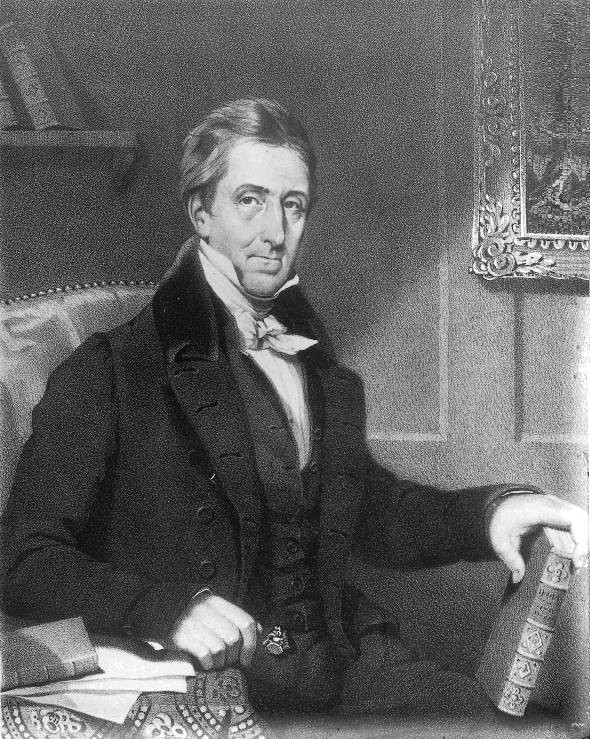
Denis-Benjamin Viger, who challenged Jobin in the 1844 election in Montreal County

After the resignation of the LaFontaine–Baldwin ministry, Governor General Metcalfe tried to find an alternative ministry. He had some success with some of the older members, who had been involved in politics prior to the Rebellion. Two of the leading members of the French-Canadian Group, Denis-Benjamin Viger and John Neilson, had voted against the resolution and in support of Governor Metcalfe. An older member from Upper Canada, William Henry Draper, was also willing to join a ministry in support of Governor Metcalfe. Viger and Draper were appointed to the Executive Council. However, in light of the strong support shown in the Legislative Assembly for the former LaFontaine–Baldwin ministry, Governor General Metcalfe prorogued Parliament in December 1843, ultimately for almost a year. Finally, in September 1844, he dissolved Parliament and called new elections.

Viger stood for election in two constituencies, as was allowed at that time, to ensure that he would be elected to the new Parliament. The two constituencies were Richelieu, which had been his seat in the previous Parliament, and Montreal County. Jobin again stood for election and defeated Viger by a large margin. Viger was also defeated in Richelieu, leaving him without a seat in the Assembly. However, overall the LaFontaine–Baldwin alliance did not win a majority of the seats in the Assembly, so they were in opposition for the next four years. Jobin continued as a steady supporter of LaFontaine and the French-Canadian Group.

=== The 1848 Elections and Responsible Government ===
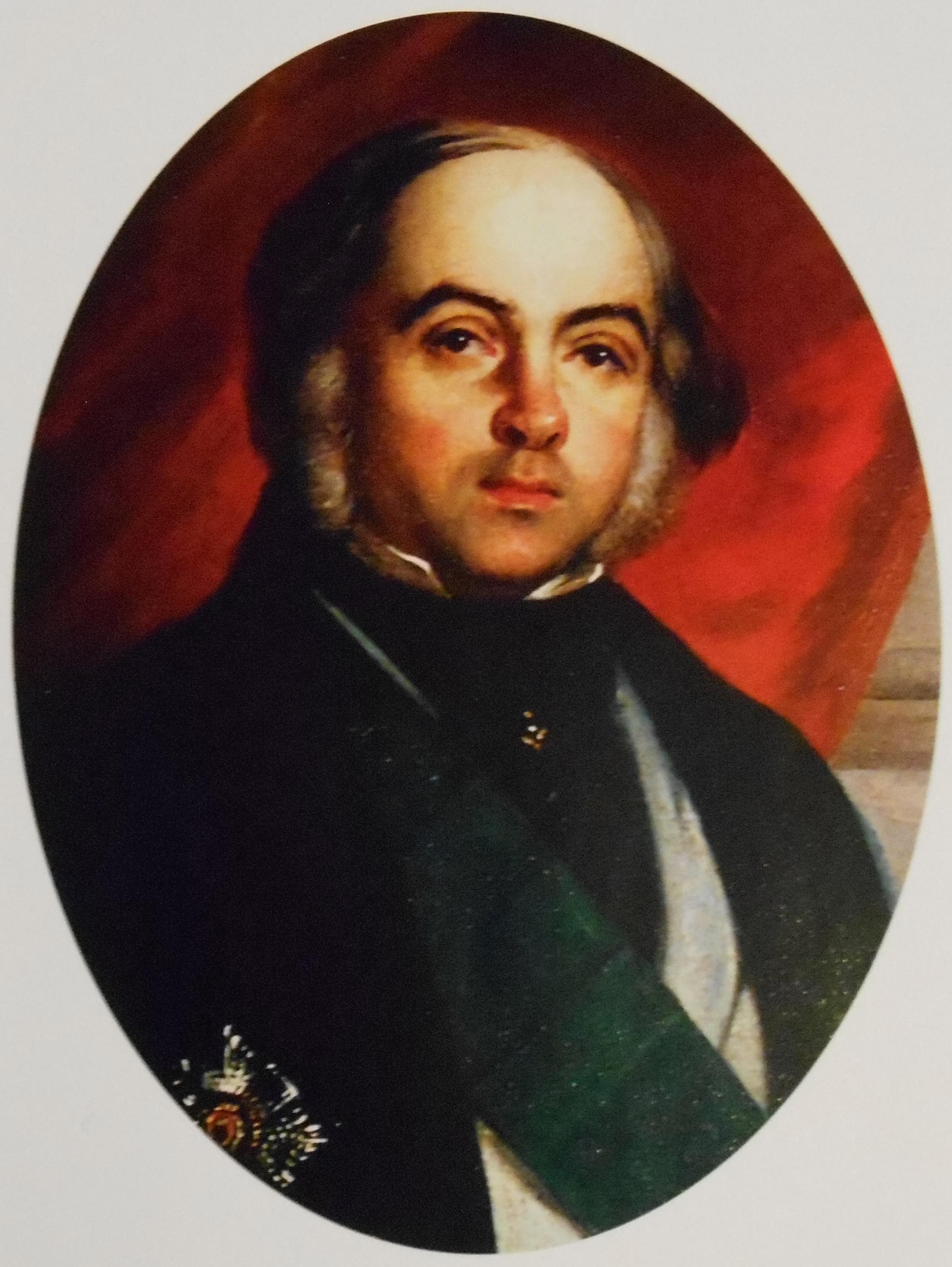
Lord Elgin, who implemented responsible government in the Province of Canada

In the 1848 general elections, the reform alliance of LaFontaine and Baldwin won a majority of seats in both Canada East and Canada West. The new governor general, Lord Elgin, had been instructed by the British government to implement the principle of responsible government, where the members of the Executive Council were drawn from the groups which commanded a majority in the Assembly. Elgin accordingly invited LaFontaine and Baldwin to form a government.

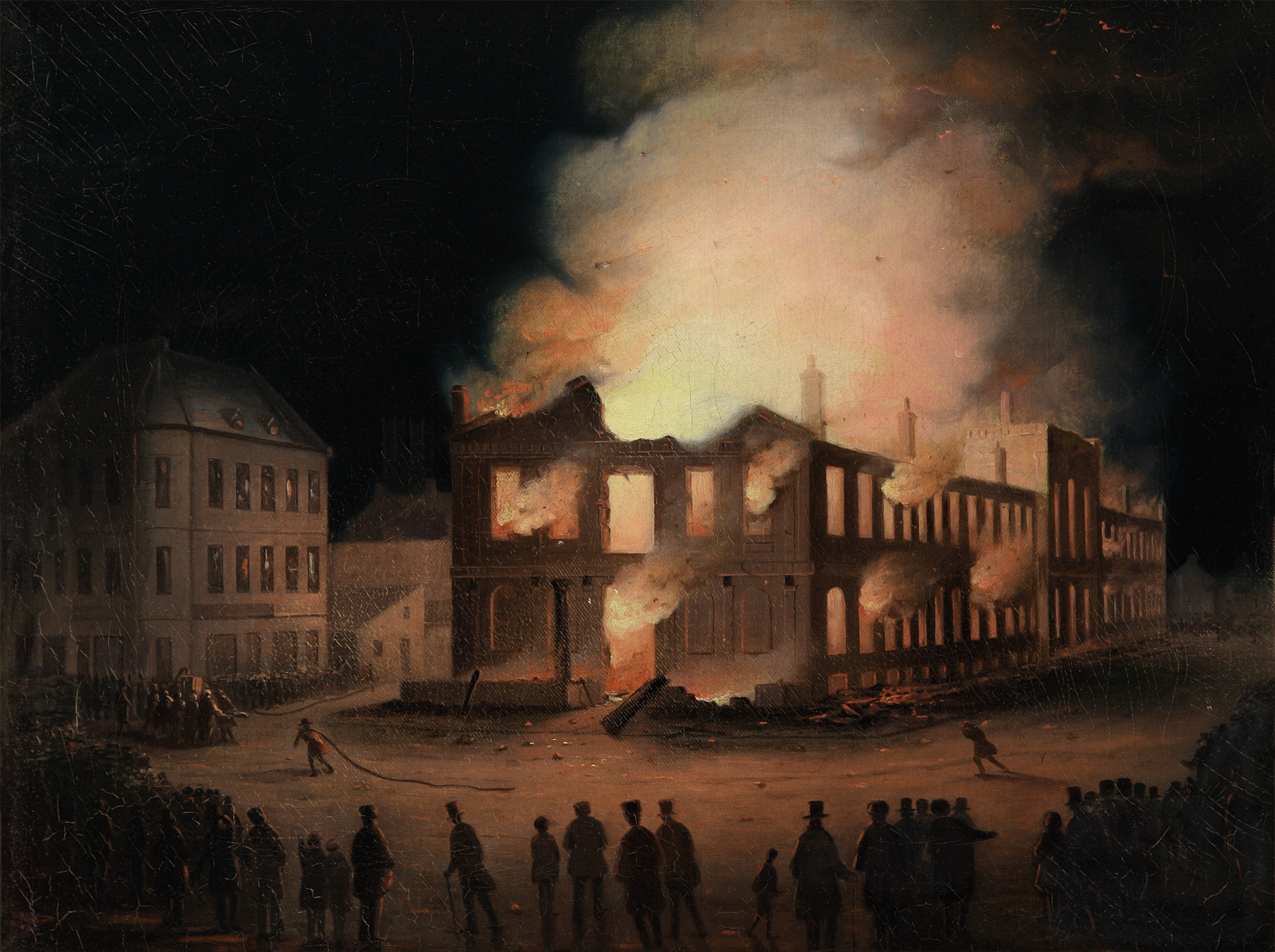
The Parliament Buildings aflame after passage of the Rebellion Losses Bill

Jobin was a consistent supporter of LaFontaine and the French-Canadian Group in Parliament. In particular, he joined in voting for the controversial Rebellion Losses Bill, which would compensate individuals in Canada East who had suffered property damage during the Lower Canada Rebellion. After Elgin gave royal assent to the bill, Tories in Montreal rioted and burnt the Parliament buildings, but the principle of responsible government was firmly established.

In addition to the Rebellion Losses Bill, Jobin supported the LaFontaine–Baldwin ministry on other significant matters, particularly a bill to improve the status of the French language in the Parliament. He also supported Baldwin's bill to restrict secret societies, aimed at the Orange Order, which had a history of violent interventions in elections.

Jobin also worked on another project in the Assembly, namely changes to the governing structure of the notarial profession. In 1850, he introduced amendments which would increase the requirements for preservation of notarial deeds, give the notarial boards in Montreal, Trois-Rivières and Quebec greater financial independence by means of fees levied on the members, and decrease the supervisory role of the courts. The changes were controversial, particularly with notaries in Montreal whom Jobin had not consulted in advance, but Jobin was successful in having the bill passed. In addition to the notaries bill, Jobin was also active with other legislation in the Assembly relating to civil legal issues, such as land registration, mutual insurance companies, land ownership by Roman Catholic orders, and turnpikes and railways.

== Later life, death and legacy ==
Jobin's standing with the reform movement was indicated when LaFontaine retired from politics in 1851. At a retirement dinner in Lafontaine's honour, Jobin was invited to sit at the head table with LaFontaine. Like LaFontaine, Jobin retired from politics in 1851, and was not a candidate in the general elections of that year.

In his later years, Jobin was highly respected in the Montreal business community. He was one of the first directors of the Montreal City and District Savings Bank, established in 1846 at the urging of Bishop Ignace Bourget to provide a savings bank for French-Canadians; the bank is still in business as of 2024 as the Laurentian Bank of Canada. In 1847 he was elected the first president of the Montreal Board of Notaries, although he resigned the position in 1849 as a result of the controversy over his proposed amendments to the law regulating notaries. In 1847 he was appointed a lieutenant-colonel in the local militia. In 1852, a year before his death, he was appointed inspector of Catholic schools in Montreal.

Jobin died in Sainte-Geneviève in 1853, and was buried from the parish church.

In 1911, the newspaper La Patrie published an article suggesting that the colonial government had imprisoned Patriotes in the old Montreal dungeon during the aftermath of the Rebellion. Another paper, Le Devoir, refuted the suggestion by citing the map that Jobin had drawn of the prison during his imprisonment.

Almost fifty years after his death, the Revue du notariat published a retrospective series on the development of the notarial profession in Quebec. The lead article was a biography of Jobin.

== See also ==
- 15th Parliament of Lower Canada
- 1st Parliament of the Province of Canada
- 2nd Parliament of the Province of Canada
- 3rd Parliament of the Province of Canada
