= Alexandre-Maurice Delisle =

Businessman, politician and public official, Province of Canada

Alexander Maurice Delisle
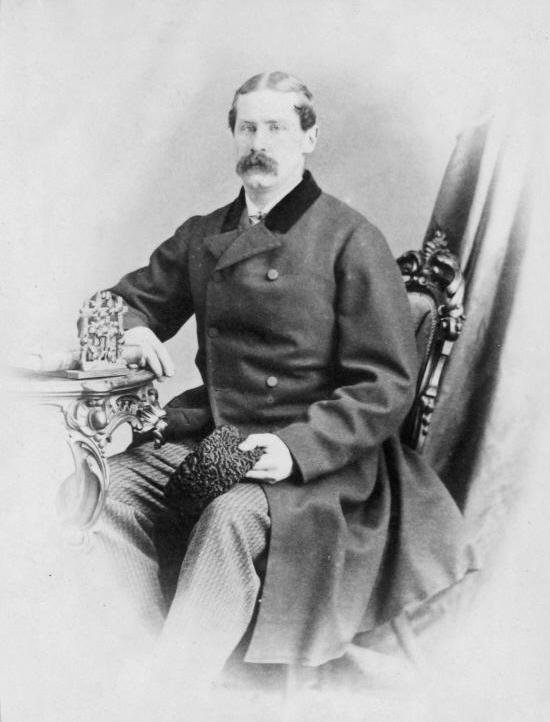

Member of the Legislative Assembly of the Province of Canada for Montreal County
- In office 1841–1843
- Preceded by: New position
- Succeeded by: André Jobin

Personal details
- Born: April 20, 1810 Montreal, Lower Canada
- Died: February 13, 1880 (age 69) Montreal, Quebec
- Party: Unionist; British Tory; Bleu
- Spouse: Marie-Angélique Cuvillier
- Relations: Austin Cuvillier (father-in-law)
- Education: Petit Séminaire de Montréal
- Occupation: Public servant and entrepreneur

Alexandre-Maurice Delisle (April 20, 1810 – February 13, 1880) was a Montreal businessman and political figure. Trained as a lawyer, he held several public service positions in the governments of Lower Canada and the Province of Canada. In 1841, he was elected to the first Parliament of the Province of Canada, and was one of only two French-Canadian members of the Assembly to vote in favour of the union of Lower Canada and Upper Canada. He resigned his seat in 1843 to return to provincial service, as clerk of the Crown. Although he left electoral politics, he was a strong supporter of the Parti Bleu. In addition to his provincial offices, he was involved in various business activities.

Delisle's career took a major setback when he was accused by his own brother of having committed frauds when serving as a clerk of the Crown. The provincial government held a public inquiry into the allegations, but the issue became a partisan dispute. The government was Liberal, Delisle was Bleu, and he lost his provincial positions in 1863. When the Conservative-Bleu alliance returned to power in 1866, they reinstated him, but the Liberal government of Alexander Mackenzie again dismissed him in 1874.

At the time of his death in 1880, Delisle was rumoured to be in line for an appointment to the Senate of Canada by the Conservative government of Sir John A. Macdonald, who was returned to office in 1878.

== Early life ==
Delisle was born in Montreal, Lower Canada (now Quebec) on April 20, 1810, son of Jean Delisle and Mary Robinson. His father was a clerk with Trinity House in Montreal, which regulated shipping on the St. Lawrence River. He studied at the Petit Séminaire de Montréal from 1817 to 1822, then articled in law. He was admitted to the bar in 1832. In 1833, he married Marie-Angélique, daughter of Austin Cuvillier, a well-established Montreal merchant and member of the Legislative Assembly of Lower Canada.

== Early career ==
Delisle began to work in the provincial public service in Montreal. He was appointed clerk of the peace and clerk of the Crown in 1833. In 1838 he was appointed the commissioner to receive the oaths of the members of the Special Council of Lower Canada, which governed the province following the Lower Canada Rebellion. That year he was again appointed clerk of the peace.

== Legislative Assembly ==
Following the rebellion in Lower Canada, and the similar rebellion in 1837 in Upper Canada (now Ontario), the British government decided to merge the two provinces into a single province, as recommended by Lord Durham in the Durham Report. The Union Act, 1840, passed by the British Parliament, abolished the two provinces and their separate parliaments, and created the Province of Canada, with a single Parliament for the entire province, composed of an elected Legislative Assembly and an appointed Legislative Council. The Governor General retained a strong position in the government.

At the request of the Governor General, Lord Sydenham, in 1841 Delisle stood as a candidate in the first general elections to the Legislative Assembly of the Province of Canada. His opponent in Montreal County was James Leslie, who had extensive political experience from his time in the Legislative Assembly of Lower Canada. Although Leslie had supported the union in principle, he disagreed with the terms, particularly the equal representation of the two Canadas in the new Parliament. Delisle campaigned in favour of the union of the Canadas. The election turned violent and two of Delisle's supporters were killed, but he was declared elected.

In the first session, one of the major issues was a motion concerning the recent union of the Canadas, which had been strongly opposed in Lower Canada. Delisle was one of two French-Canadian members of the Assembly who voted in favour of the union, the other being Melchior-Alphonse de Salaberry. During his time in the Assembly, Delisle was a consistent supporter of the Governor, and a member of the informal "British Tory" group from Canada East.

Delisle resigned his seat in 1843 to return to the post of clerk of the Crown in Montreal.

== Later career ==
Although Delisle had left the Assembly, he had not stopped his involvement in politics. As clerk of the Crown in Montreal, he was returning officer for a Montreal by-election in 1844, which also turned violent. Delisle was a strong supporter of the candidate of Governor General Metcalfe, who was defeated. Delisle was an early and strong supporter of the Parti bleu, the conservative party which gradually emerged in Canada East. He gave large sums to election campaigns, and was a close friend and respected advisor of George-Étienne Cartier, who became the leader of the Bleus and a Father of Confederation.

Delisle was a successful land speculator, particularly in the Rimouski and Pointe-au-Père areas. He was involved in banking, serving as a director and later the president for the Montreal City and District Savings Bank, and also a director of the City Bank of Montreal. He helped promote the Montreal and Bytown Railway, personally investing £1000, and also served as its president. Delisle also served as director and later president for the Champlain and St. Lawrence Railroad, until it combined with the Grand Trunk Railway. He was also a director of the Gulf of St. Lawrence Steamship Company, which involved business travel to the West Indies and South America.

In 1859, he was named to the Montreal Harbour Commission, and in 1862 he was appointed sheriff of Montreal. In 1864, he bought a large tract of land which became the town of Sainte-Cunégonde, later incorporated into the city of Montreal and known as Little Burgundy.

== Fraud charges ==
In 1863, Delisle was accused of fraud by his own brother, Michel-Charles, relating to his term as clerk of the Crown. Delisle and two others in the office were alleged to have over-charged for the issuing of subpoenas from the office, and used the difference to fund their own speculative ventures. The provincial government of the day, the Sandfield Macdonald-Sicotte ministry, appointed a commission of inquiry, which turned into a heavily partisan matter. The government was Liberal-Rouge and Delisle was Bleu. He called a large number of witnesses in his behalf, most of whom were high-ranking Bleus. Delisle maintained that the whole thing was the result of the machinations of Joseph Doutre, a Montreal lawyer who was a strong supporter of the Liberals and Parti rouge.

The commissioners concluded that the allegations were upheld. The government relieved of Delisle of his posts as harbour commissioner and sheriff. When the Conservative/Bleu parties regained power in 1866, he was reinstated to the harbour commission and also given the post of customs collector at Montreal. He held those offices until the Liberals returned to power in 1874, when he was again dismissed.

== Last years ==
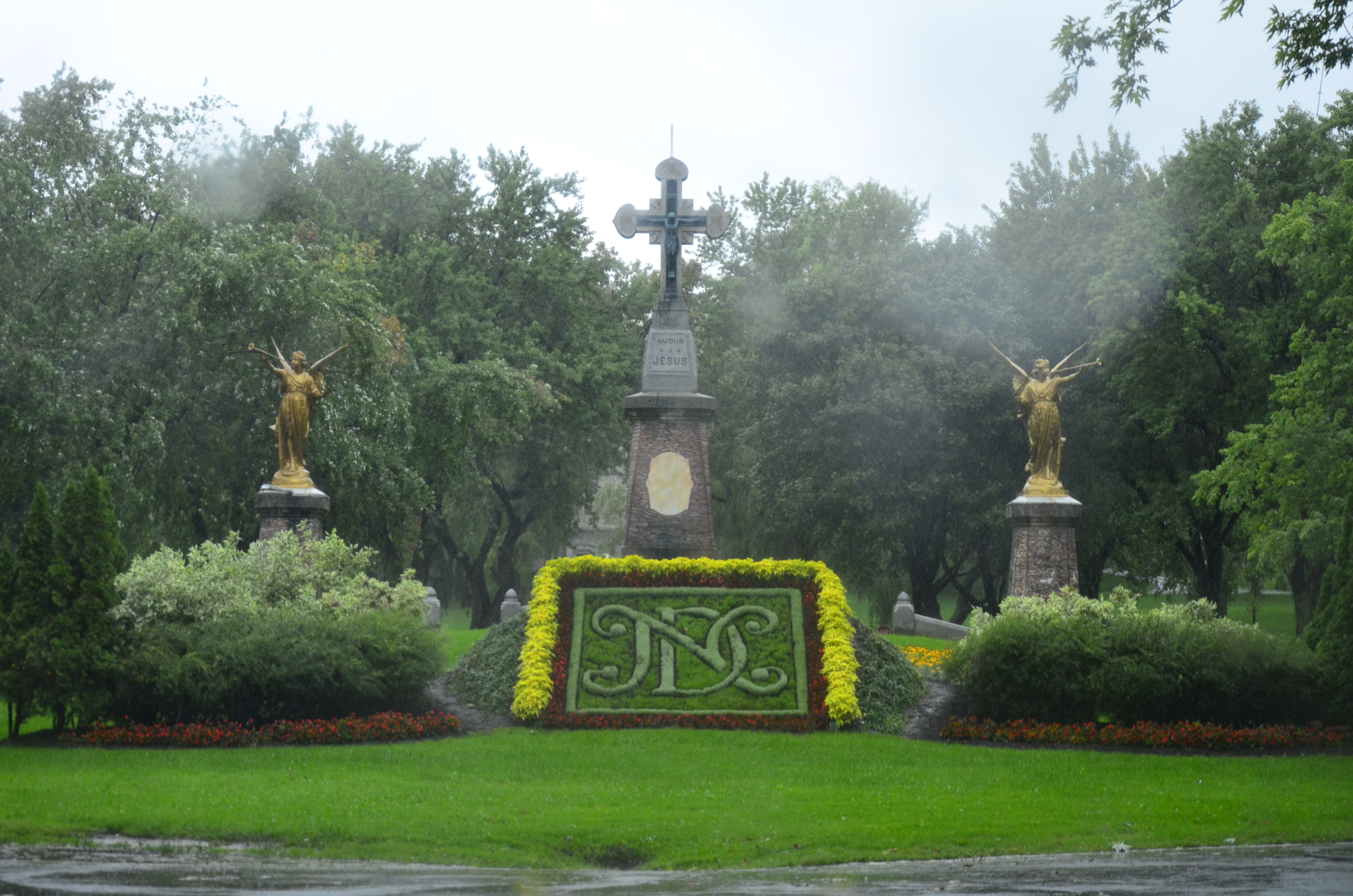
Notre-Dame des Neiges Cemetery, where Delisle is buried

Delisle died at Montreal in 1880. It was rumoured that he was in line for appointment to the Senate of Canada by the Conservative government of Sir John A. Macdonald, who had been returned to power in the 1878 election.

Delisle died a wealthy man, having profited greatly from his various business and entrepreneurial activities. He was buried in the Notre Dame des Neiges Cemetery, close to the gravesite of his political ally, Cartier.

== See also ==
1st Parliament of the Province of Canada
