= Joseph Guibord =

Canadian typographer

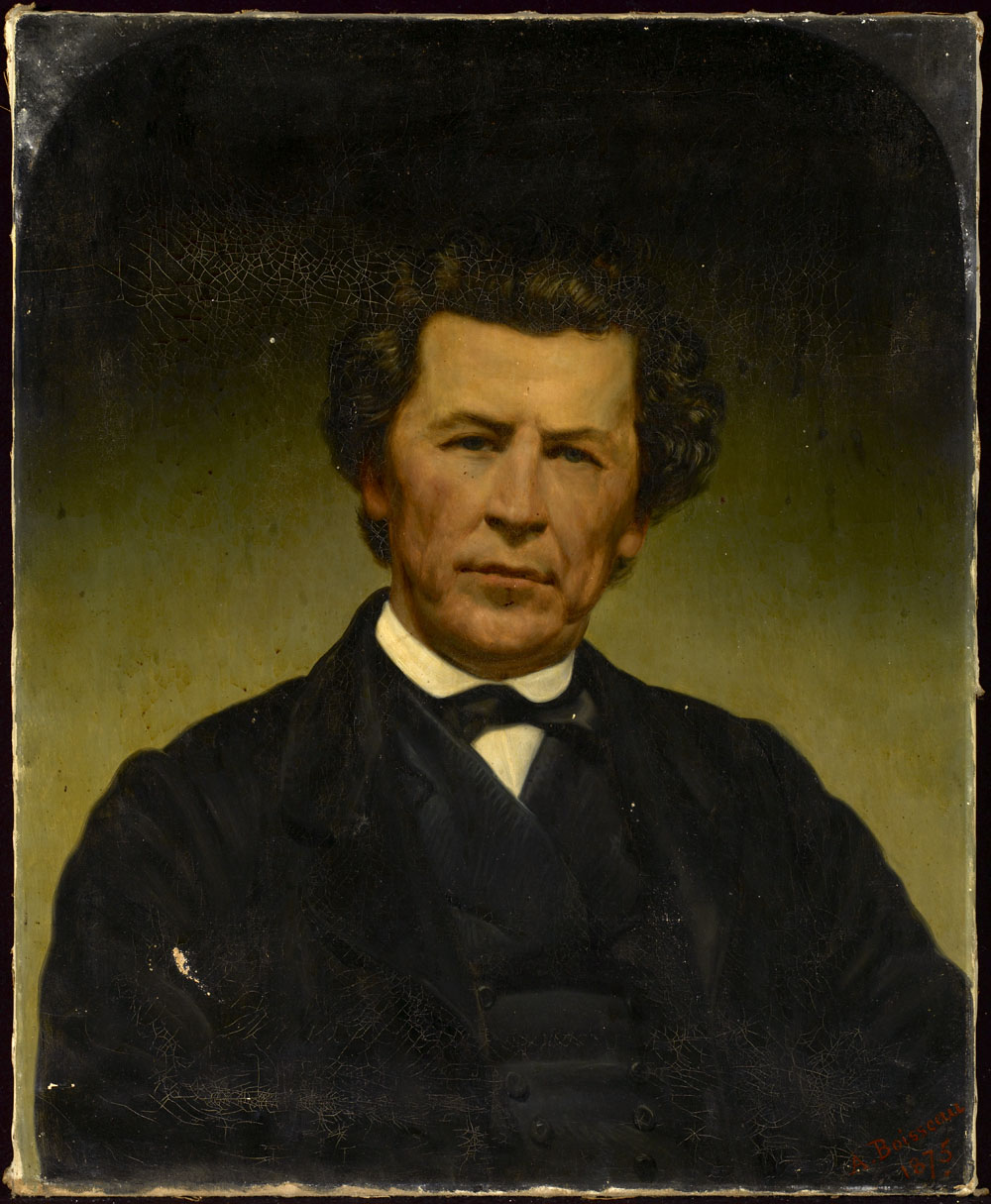
A portrait of Joseph Guibord, painted in 1875 by Alfred Boisseau

Joseph Guibord (31 March 1809 – 18 November 1869) was a printer in Montreal, Quebec, Canada. Guibord was acknowledged as one of the best typographers in Canada; he is thought to have introduced stereotype printing to Canada; and he printed a catechism in an Indian language at the request of André-Marie Garin, a missionary in the northwest. However, Guibord's notability is based on events after his death: as a member of the Institut Canadien de Montréal, he was denied ecclesiastical burial by the Roman Catholic Church in the Montreal cemetery of Notre-Dame-des-Neiges. His widow, Henriette Brown, challenged the refusal in the courts, and for five years his body lay in temporary accommodation in a Protestant cemetery as the court action worked its way through the Quebec courts. Finally, five years after his death, the Judicial Committee of the Privy Council, at that time the court of last resort for the British Empire, allowed his widow's appeal in the Guibord Case and ordered the Church to provide a burial in the portion of the burial ground reserved for Roman Catholics. Religious and political passions were highly aroused by the Judicial Committee's decision and a military escort was needed to carry out the order for burial.

== Membership in the Institut Canadien ==
Guibord was a founding member of the Institut Canadien de Montréal. The Institut was founded in 1844 by a group of approximately 200 young professionals of liberal ideology. They tended to support the Rouge party, and provided a library, a reading room and a forum for debates. Given their political views, they came into conflict with the hierarchy of the Roman Catholic church, at that time a very powerful conservative force in Quebec society, being heavily influenced by ultramontane thought. Eventually, the Annuaire de l’Institut Canadien pour 1868 was placed on the Church's Index of Prohibited Books. The Bishop of Montréal, Ignace Bourget, issued an ordinance which was circulated by the Montreal clergy, condemning the Annuaire and membership in the Institut: "He who persists in the desire to remain in the said Institut or to read or merely possess the above-mentioned yearbook without being so authorized by the Church deprives himself of the sacraments at the hour of his death."

== Death ==
Three months after Bishop Bourget's ordinance, Guibord was suddenly taken ill and near death. A priest was summoned, who gave Guibord communion and absolution, without knowing of Guibord's membership in the Institut. After leaving, the priest learned of Guibord's membership in the Institut and returned to the Guibord residence. He told Guibord that he should never have granted him absolution and demanded that Guibord resign from the Institut. Guibord refused. He died shortly thereafter.

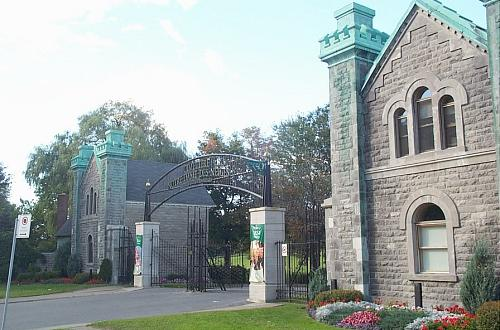
Entrance to Notre-Dame-des-Neiges Cemetery

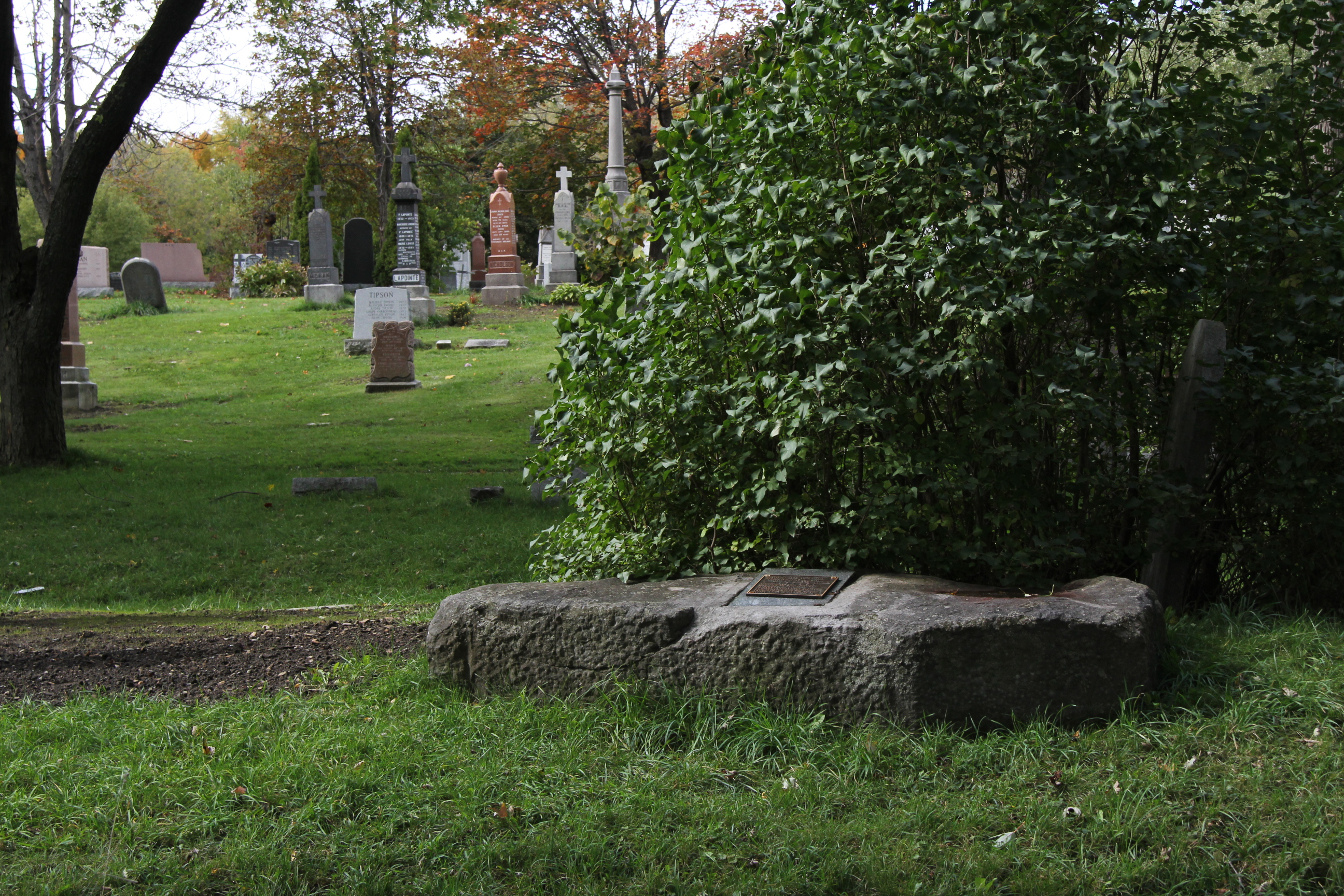
Joseph Guibord's tombstone

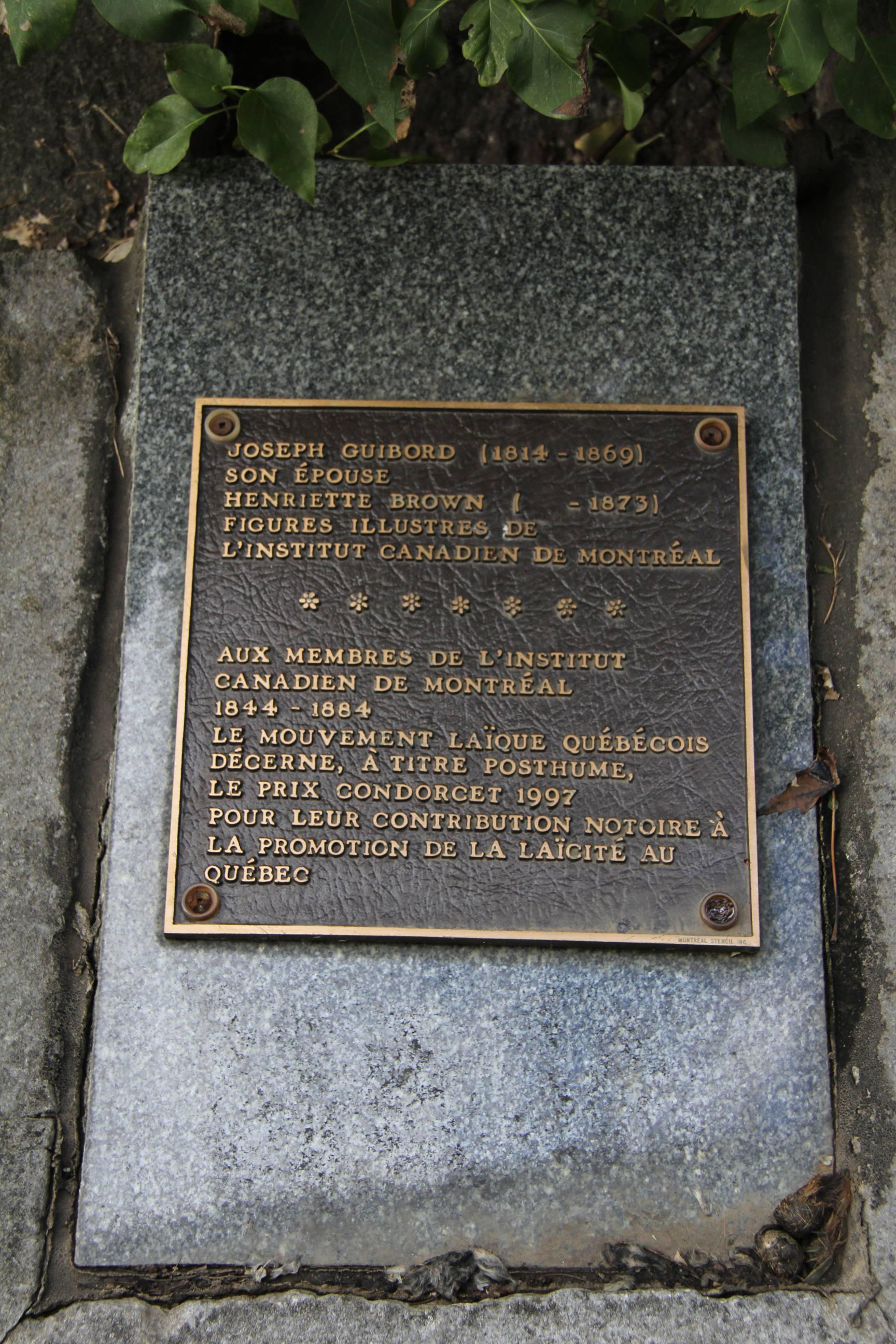

On 20 November 1869, Joseph Doutre, Q.C., on behalf of Henriette Brown, Guibord's widow, applied to the Curé of the Parish of Montreal for the burial of Guibord in Notre Dame des Neiges Cemetery, tendering the usual fee. The Curé sought instructions from the grand vicar of the Diocese (Bishop Bourget being absent), who instructed the Curé to refuse ecclesiastical burial. The Curé instead offered to bury Guibord in the part of the burial-ground for persons who were not members of the Roman Catholic faith, and without Catholic funeral rites. Doutre was prepared to forego funeral rites, provided Guibord was buried in the portion of the burial ground for Roman Catholics. The church official refused this offer. The next day, the body was taken to the cemetery and burial was requested. The cemetery officials refused. The body was then taken to a neighbouring Protestant cemetery, Mount Royal Cemetery, for temporary accommodation, which lasted for six years.

== Court proceedings ==
Guibord's widow, Henriette Brown, challenged the Church's refusal in the courts of Quebec. The court of first instance, the Superior Court, granted her request for an order compelling burial with ecclesiastical rites, but the church officials appealed to the Quebec Court of Review, which allowed the appeal and set aside the order. Brown then appealed to the Quebec Court of Queen's Bench (Appeal Side), which dismissed her appeal. She then appealed to the Judicial Committee of the Privy Council, which agreed to hear her appeal. However, before the appeal could be heard, Brown died. The Institut Canadien, as Brown's heir under her will, was authorized to prosecute the appeal. The hearing before the Judicial Committee lasted for seven days. On 21 November 1874, five years after the attempted burial, the Judicial Committee issued its decision granting the appeal and ordering the church to bury Guibord in the Roman Catholic portion of the cemetery. The Judicial Committee did not order the Curé to provide ecclesiastical rites, as the Institut Canadien did not seek to have that portion of the Superior Court's order restored.

== Burial of Joseph Guibord ==
Passions were aroused by the decision and it took two attempts to carry out the burial. On the first occasion, on 2 September 1875, the burial party was turned away by an angry crowd. On the second, successful, attempt, on 16 November 1875, the burial party was accompanied by an armed police and military escort, numbering approximately 2,500 men. There was no formal ceremony, but a former apprentice of Guibord came forward and made the sign of the cross over the coffin.

Following the burial, Bishop Bourget deconsecrated the ground in which Guibord lay, declaring the place of burial forever "under an interdict and separate from the rest of the cemetery."

== Sources ==
- L. C. Clark (ed.). The Guibord Affair (Toronto and Montreal, 1971).
- Joseph Doutre, Plaidoyer pour Guibord, présentation par Robert Hébert, Liber (Montréal, 2008)
- Robert Hébert, Le Procès Guibord, ou L'interprétation des restes, Trytique (Montréal, 1992)
- Théophile Hudon, L’Institut canadien de Montréal et l’affaire Guibord; une page d’histoire (Montréal, 1938).
- Adrien Thério, "Les grandes batailles de Mgr Bourget: l’Institut canadien, l’affaire Guibord et l’université de Montréal," Perspectives/Le Nouvelliste (Trois-Rivières), 9 (1967), no.20, 29–37.
