= Guibord case =

Court case in Canada about freedom of belief

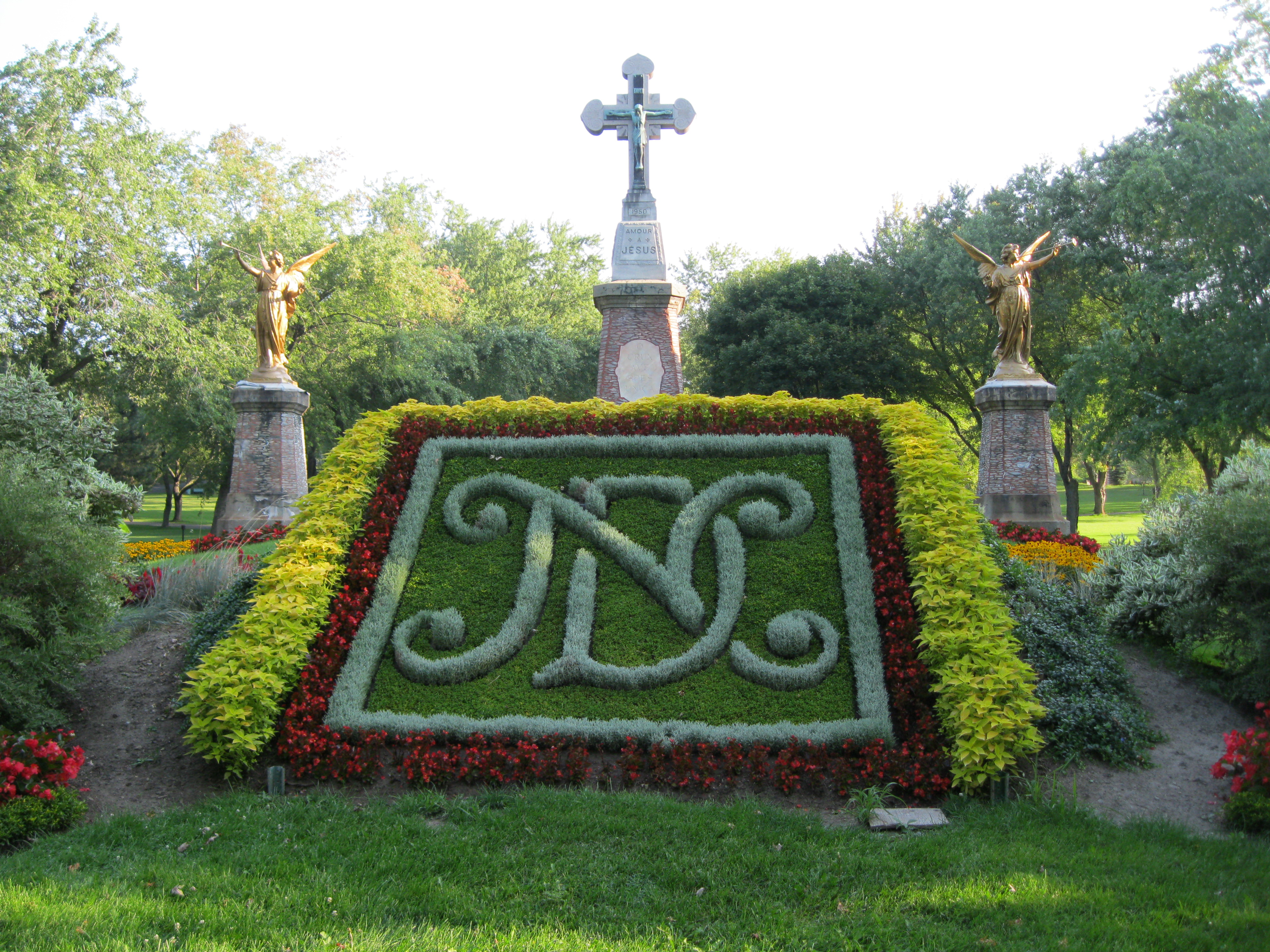
- The Notre-Dame-des-Neiges cemetery, where Guibord was refused burial
- Court: Judicial Committee of the Privy Council
- Full case name: Brown v Les Curé et Marguilliers de l'Œuvre et de la Fabrique de la Paroisse de Montréal
- Decided: 21 November 1874
- Citations: (1874), L.R. 6 P.C. 157, [1874] UKPC 70 (P.C.)

Case history
- Appealed from: Quebec Court of Queen's Bench (Appeal Side)

Court membership
- Judges sitting: Lord Selborne; Sir James W. Colvile; Sir Robert J. Phillimore; Sir Barnes Peacock; Sir Montague E. Smith; Sir Robert P. Collier

Case opinions
- Decision by: Sir Robert J. Phillimore

Keywords
- Church and state

Brown v Les Curé et Marguilliers de l'Œuvre et Fabrique de Notre Dame de Montréal, better known as the Guibord case, was a decision in 1874 by the Judicial Committee of the Privy Council in an early Canadian legal dispute over the relationship between church and state.

The question was whether the church officials of the Parish of Montréal could refuse to bury a deceased member of the Church because of his political beliefs. Joseph Guibord had been a member of the Institut Canadien de Montréal, an association dedicated to the principles of liberalism. The Institut was at odds with the Roman Catholic church, at that time very powerful in Quebec and very conservative. When he died, the church officials of the Parish of Montréal refused to allow his widow, Henriette Brown, to have his remains buried in the section of the Côte des Neiges Cemetery reserved for Roman Catholics.

Brown brought a petition in the Quebec courts to require the church officials to allow her to bury her husband in the cemetery. The case was ultimately decided by the Judicial Committee, at that time the court of last resort for Canada within the British Empire. The Judicial Committee ruled that the church officials had to allow Guibord's remains to be buried in the Roman Catholic section of the cemetery, although without full religious rites. The case caused great political and religious controversy in Quebec.

== Background ==
The case centred on a man named Joseph Guibord, a member of the Institut Canadien. The Institut was a liberal association with a public library and debating room for literary and scientific discussions. The views of its members, who tended to support the Rouges in Quebec politics, brought them into conflict with the Roman Catholic Church, which at that time had significant influence in Quebec society and with the Quebec government. Eventually, the Bishop of Montreal, Ignace Bourget, issued a pastoral letter forbidding membership in the Institut, and stating that no absolution was possible for member, "même à l'article de la mort."

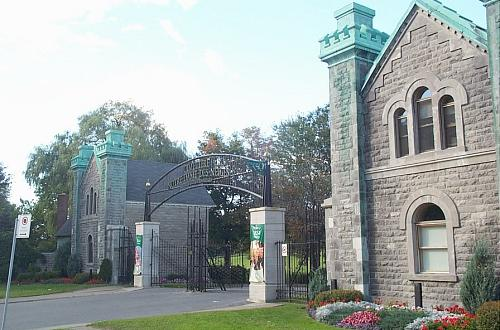
Entrance to Côte-des-Neiges Cemetery

Guibord died suddenly in 1869. His widow, Henriette Brown, sought to have him buried in the Côte des Neiges Cemetery, at that time the only cemetery for Roman Catholics in Montreal. The Church refused to permit the burial, except in the portion of the cemetery reserved for non-Roman Catholics and unbaptised infants, and without religious rites. Brown was willing to forego the religious ceremony, but insisted that her husband be buried in the Roman Catholic portion of the cemetery. The church officials refused. Brown and her supporters argued that the Church's decision contradicted its role under the civil law to give burial, but the Church argued it would permit the civil burial, and that Guibord not being buried in holy ground was a question of religious freedom.

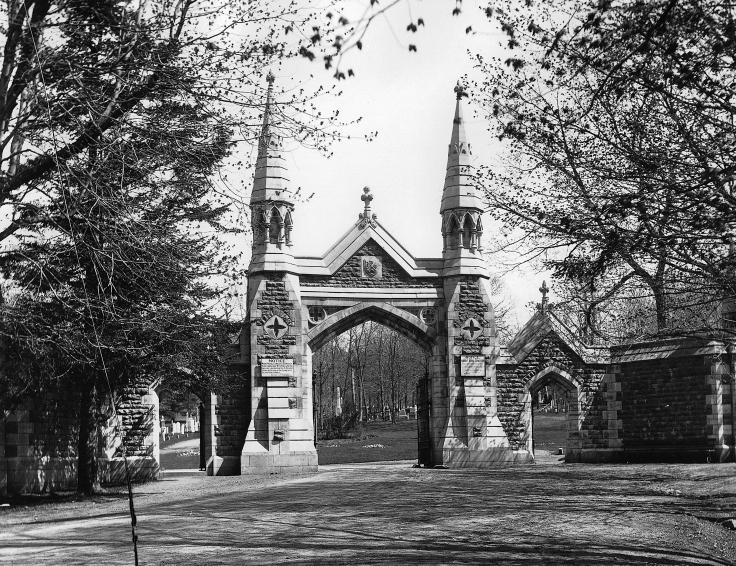
Mount Royal Cemetery gate

After two attempts to have Guibord buried in the Côte-des-Neiges Cemetery, his remains were temporarily lodged in the neighbouring Mount Royal cemetery, a Protestant cemetery.

== Decisions of the Quebec Courts ==
=== Superior Court ===
Brown then applied to the Superior Court of Quebec for an order of mandamus compelling the church officials to provide a burial for her husband in the Côte des Neiges Cemetery. The pleadings filed by both sides were complex, with several supplemental pleadings from both sides. Brown sought to have Guibord's remains buried in the Roman Catholic portion of the cemetery, "conformably to custom and law," and argued that her husband had been a practising Roman Catholic at the time of his death, filing his baptismal certificate and their wedding certificate. The church officials challenged the availability of the remedy of mandamus, as well as denying that they had refused civil burial to Guibord. They asserted that they were prepared to carry out their civil duty to bury the remains, but as a matter of religious freedom, the Church had the right to decide whether to bury him in the portion of the cemetery reserved for Roman Catholics. They also alleged that Guibord had been a "pécheur public" (i.e. - a public sinner), and therefore could be denied burial under Roman Catholic doctrine.

The petition was argued on 17 March 1870, before Mr Justice Mondelet. On 2 May 1870, Mondelet J. granted Brown's petition and ordered the burial of the deceased by the church officials, according to custom and law in the same way as any other parishioner who dies with the status of a Roman Catholic, and to enter his name in the parochial register according to law. He also ordered that the church officials pay Brown's court costs.

=== Court of Review ===
The church officials then appealed to the Court of Review, which heard argument on 23 June 1870. On 10 September 1870, that Court allowed the appeal and dismissed the widow's petition. Speaking for the Court, Mr Justice Mackay held that the pleadings and judgment below were both defective. A writ of mandamus is only available to give specific, defined relief. The order to have Guibord buried "according to custom and law" was not a specific remedy, as it did not make clear where the burial was to take place. The church officials could comply with it by burying him in the portion for non-Roman Catholics, which would not be satisfactory to the widow. As well, the order to fill out the parochial records was defective, since the church officials named in the petition did not have custody of the parochial records. Finally, the decision below was bad for dismissing the church officials' plea of their religious freedom.

=== Court of Queen's Bench ===
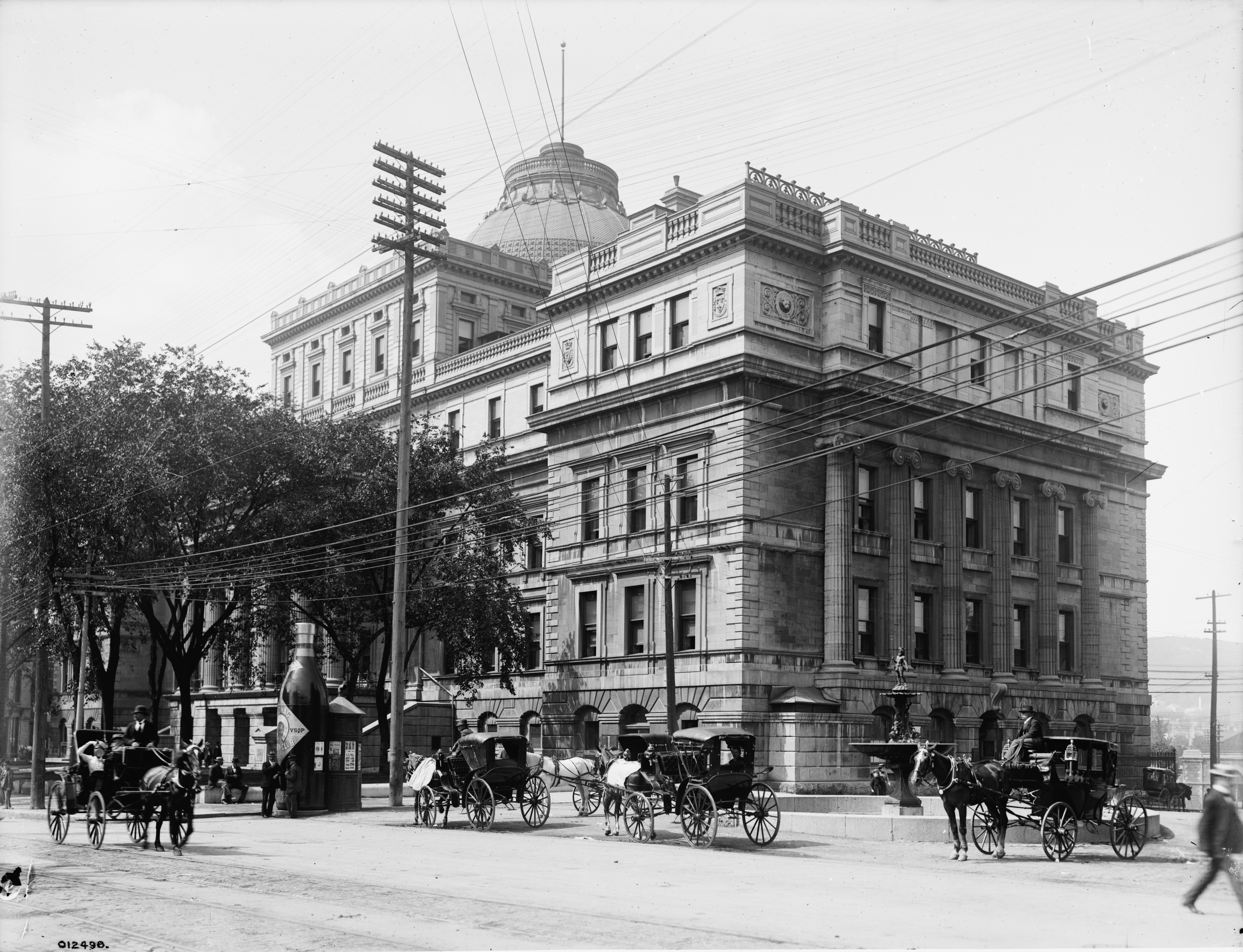
Old Montreal Palais de Justice

Brown then appealed to the Quebec Court of Queen's Bench (Appeal Side).

When the matter first came on for argument, on 2 December 1870, Brown's counsel applied to have four of the judges who were about to hear the appeal recuse themselves under s. 176 of the Code of Civil Procedure. They argued that one of the points in issue was the extent of the civil courts' power over the church, which was denied by Roman Catholic church doctrine under pain of anathema and excommunication. Since the four judges (Chief Justice Duval and Justices Caron, Badgley and Monk) were Roman Catholics, counsel argued that they "acknowledged the authority of the Roman power" and could be under the threat of excommunication if they did not rule in favour of the church officials. The Court heard argument on the motion for recusation and reserved their decision. A week later, on 9 December 1870, they gave their decision, refusing to receive the petitions for recusation, or to allow them to be entered in the register of the Court. The Court, composed of Duval C.J., Caron, Drummond, Badgely and Monk, then heard the appeal.

On 7 September 1871, the Queen's Bench unanimously dismissed Brown's appeal and upheld the decision of the Court of Review, but on divided grounds, with each judge giving reasons:

- Caron J. held that the original writ was void for not containing a command; that it was defective in being addressed to both the curé and the fabrique, as only the curé had superintendence of burials and entries in the register; that the petition was only for civil burial, which the church officials had offered to perform; and that the church officials' condition that the burial be in a particular part of the burial ground was reasonable.
- Duval C.J. agreed with Caron J., but based his judgment on the defect in the form of the writ.
- Drummond J. held that the writ was right in form, but agreed that the appeal should be dismissed because the civil courts had no jurisdiction to order ecclesiastical burial when refused by the ecclesiastical authorities.
- Badgley J. held that the writ was right in form, and that the courts did have the power to order the performance of the duties although affecting spiritual rights, but agreed that the appeal should be dismissed because the writ commanded the performance of two duties, the burial and the entry into the parochial register, and the church officials named in the petition had no power to carry out the command to enter the burial in the parochial register.
- Monk J. held that the writ and all proceedings were regular and sufficient, but agreed that the appeal should be dismissed because the courts had no jurisdiction over the matters in dispute.

The Court ordered Brown to pay the church officials' court costs.

== Appeal to the Judicial Committee ==
=== Standing of the Institut to Appeal following Brown's Death ===
Brown then applied successfully for leave to appeal to the Judicial Committee of the Privy Council, at that time the court of last resort within the British Empire. However, before her appeal could be heard, Brown died on 24 March 1873. In her will, she left all that she had to the Institut Canadien. The Institut then applied to be allowed to prosecute the appeal, on the basis that as Brown's heir, the Institut was liable to pay the court costs in the Quebec courts and therefore had a legitimate interest in the litigation. In an interim decision in 1873, the Judicial Committee gave the Institut standing to carry the appeal, without prejudice to the church officials' right to challenge the standing at the hearing of the appeal.

=== Decision: Appeal Allowed ===
The Judicial Committee heard the appeal in the early summer of 1874, devoting seven sitting days to the hearing. The Institut was represented by Mr Doutre, Q.C., of the Quebec Bar, and Mr Bompas, of the English Bar. The church officials were represented by Mr Matthews, Q.C., and Mr Westlake, Q.C., both of the English Bar. On 21 November 1874, the Judicial Committee gave its decision, allowing the appeal and ordering the church officials to provide a burial for the deceased in the area of the cemetery reserved for Roman Catholics.

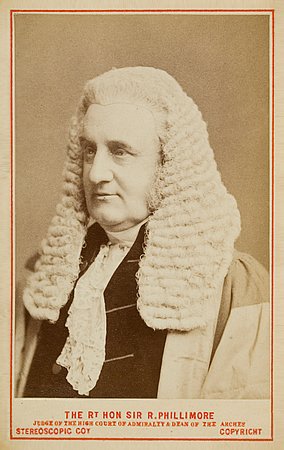
Sir Robert Phillimore

The judgment of the Committee was given by Sir Robert Phillimore, a noted expert in ecclesiastical law in England. He addressed the various procedural issues which had been raised by the case, beginning by noting that the church officials had not pressed their objections to the Institut's standing to carry on the appeal, since the Institut was Brown's universal legatee and therefore had an interest in having the order to pay costs overturned. He also confirmed that the Committee did not think the argument for recusation of the Queen's Bench judges could be sustained. As well, he ruled that the original writ for mandamus was in proper form and gave the court sufficient discretion to craft the remedy sought.

Turning to the merits of the appeal, Phillimore J. declined to rule on the precise status of the Roman Catholic Church in Quebec, such as whether it should be considered an established church, and also declined to rule on whether the civil courts of Quebec retained the jurisdiction over the church which the courts of New France had held before the Conquest. Instead, he based his decision on the principle that even if churches are merely voluntary and private organisations, the members of church are entitled to have the church administered according to the church's own internal laws and rules. In this case, the issue was whether the deceased had forfeited the right to ecclesiastical burial according to the church's own internal laws.

Phillimore J. then reviewed the pre-Conquest Quebec Ritual dealing with refusal of ecclesiastical burial. The three possibilities under the Ritual cited by counsel for the church officials in support of the refusal were that Guibord had been excommunicated as a result of his membership in the Institut; that he had failed to take communion at Easter-tide; and that he was a "pecheur public" as a result of belonging to the Institut. Phillimore J. ruled that to come under the category of excommunication, it would have been necessary for the Bishop of Montreal to excommunicate Guibord by name. Phillimore J. acknowledged that such an action was solely within the power of the Bishop, and if it had occurred, would not have been reviewable by the courts. However, the evidence showed that there had been no such explicit excommunication of Guibord. Phillimore J. also dismissed the argument based on Guibord's failure to take Easter communion since Guibord had sought to partake of the sacrament, but the church had denied him because of his membership in the Institut.

Finally, Phillimore J. reviewed the category of a "pecheur public," which was defined in the Ritual by reference to activities such as prostitution and usury. Counsel for the church officials argued that this category was very broad, and could include any activities which the Bishop defined to be public sins. Phillimore J. rejected that interpretation of the Ritual and concluded that while it might be broadened beyond the specific examples of public sinners given in the Ritual, it could not be expanded indefinitely by the Bishop. The Bishop could not unilaterally dispense with the application of the general ecclesiastical law and prohibit ecclesiastical burial of a parishioner on whatever grounds the Bishop personally thought sufficient. Phillimore J. held that there was no indication in the record that the members of the Roman Catholic Church in Quebec had at any time consented to such an expansion of the Bishop's authority. Phillimore J. concluded that Guibord had not been a "pécheur public" as defined by the Ritual and so the church officials did not have the power under their own Ritual to deny him ecclesiastical burial.

In conclusion, Phillimore J. noted that the Committee was not deciding whether the civil courts could order that the burial be accompanied by the usual ecclesiastical rites because Brown had forewent that demand and counsel for the Institut had not requested it in the appeal to the Committee. Instead, the Committee's judgment was that the orders of the Court of Review and Court of Queen's Bench be reversed and that an order issue, requiring the church officials to allow the burial of the deceased in the section of the cemetery reserved for Roman Catholics, upon payment of all the usual fees. The Committee also ordered costs to the Institut in all of the lower courts and the appeal to the Committee, except for the costs of the motion to recuse the judges in the Queen's Bench.

As was the practice of the Judicial Committee at that time, Phillimore gave the decision for the entire committee, with no reasons from any of the other judges.

== Aftermath ==
Following the court ruling, two attempts were needed to perform the burial of Guibord's remains in Côte-des-Neiges Cemetery. The first attempt was on 2 September 1875, but the burial party was turned away by an angry crowd. On the second, successful, attempt, on 16 November 1875, the burial party was accompanied by an armed police and military escort, numbering approximately 2,500 men. He was buried in the same plot as the remains of his widow, Henriette Brown. The coffin was encased in a mixture of cement and metal scraps to prevent disinterment by irate Catholics.

Following the burial, Bishop Bourget deconsecrated the ground in which Guibord lay, declaring the place of burial forever "under an interdict and separate from the rest of the cemetery."

Some years after the decision of the Judicial Committee, the Legislature of Quebec responded to the decision by enacting a law which stated that the Catholic church officials had sole authority to determine whether a person could be buried in consecrated ground, effectively changing the law as determined by the Judicial Committee. The law is still in force today, as part of the Burial Act of Quebec.

== Analysis ==
Professor Rainer Knopff argues the Judicial Committee compromised between two decisions of the lower courts: that the religious freedom argument was frivolous on one hand; or that the courts, not being a Catholic leadership, could not rule on whether a burial should be carried out in accordance with religious procedure on the other. The Judicial Committee, conversely, concluded that while the courts were not Catholic leaders, they could uphold the people's rights and Guibord was entitled to a burial in holy ground. However, the Court did not compel other religious ceremonies to be performed because it was not a Catholic institution. Although burial anywhere could theoretically be justified under the law, the Judicial Committee ruled burial in holy ground was appropriate in this case and advised the other ceremonies to be performed. The reasoning was that if Guibord was not buried in holy ground, his reputation would be damaged. As Guibord was a good person, he should not be defamed while a terrible person, on the other hand, probably could be denied religious burial.

The Judicial Committee's decision has been cited in subsequent court decisions. The case has also been referred to recently in a law journal article dealing with a similar issue of the relationship between the civil courts and religious authorities, in the context of civil and Jewish divorces.
