= Marc-Aurèle Plamondon =

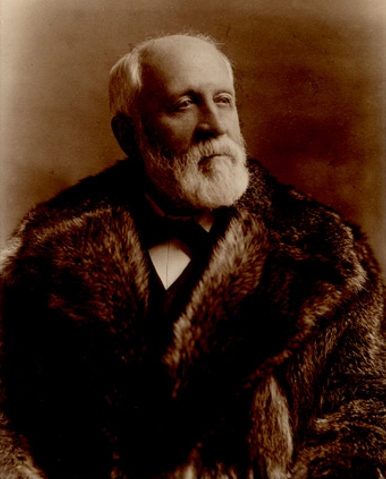
- Born: 16 October 1823; Quebec City, Lower Canada
- Died: 4 August 1900 (aged 76); Arthabaskaville (Arthabaska), Quebec
- Occupation(s): lawyer, journalist, publisher, and judge

Marc-Aurèle Plamondon (16 October 1823 – 4 August 1900) was a Canadian lawyer, journalist, publisher, and judge.

He was one of the founders of the Institut canadien de Montréal and the Institut canadien de Québec. From 1855 to 1859, he was co-owner and co-editor of the newspaper, Le National of Quebec. In 1857, he was twice defeated when he ran for a seat in the Legislative Assembly of the Province of Canada for Quebec City. He was appointed to the Quebec Superior Court as a judge for the district of Arthabaska in 1874 and served until 1897.
