= Michel-François Valois =

Canadian politician

Michel-François Valois (French pronunciation: [miʃɛl fʁɑ̃swa valwa]; August 20, 1801 – May 24, 1869) was a physician and medical doctor figure in Canada East.

He was born in Pointe-Claire in 1801 and studied at the Collège de Montréal. He was licensed to practise medicine in 1826 and set up practice in Pointe-Claire. Valois became a school trustee in 1830. He helped organize in a major rally against the British authorities held at Saint-Laurent in May 1837. Valois was captured and put in prison at Montreal; he spent some time in the United States and then returned. In 1851, he was elected to the Legislative Assembly of the Province of Canada for Montreal county as a member of the Parti rouge. In 1854, Valois was elected again in Jacques-Cartier (formerly Montreal county).

He died in Pointe-Claire in 1869.
