= Saint-Alexis, Quebec (parish) =

District in Canada

The parish municipality of Saint-Alexis (French pronunciation: [sɛ̃t‿alɛksi]) is a former parish now part of the current municipality of Saint-Alexis, Quebec, Canada.

Prior to December 19, 2012, the parish of Saint-Alexis was an independent municipality; on that date, it and the village of Saint-Alexis were merged into the new municipality of Saint-Alexis.

== History ==
The parish was founded in 1855. In 1920, the more urban sector split to became the village municipality of Saint-Alexis. Those two territories were then merged once again, in 2012, for the creation of the current Saint-Alexis.

== Demographics ==
Historical census populations – Saint-Alexis Parish (1855-7-1 – 2012-12-19)

Year	Pop.	±%
1871	1,360	—
1881	1,245	−8.5%
1891	1,231	−1.1%
1901	1,153	−6.3%
1911	1,329	+15.3%
1921	873	−34.3%
1931	850	−2.6%

Year	Pop.	±%
1941	792	−6.8%
1951	720	−9.1%
1956	769	+6.8%
1961	733	−4.7%
1966	781	+6.5%
1971	779	−0.3%
1976	746	−4.2%

Year	Pop.	±%
1981	733	−1.7%
1986	709	−3.3%
1991	738	+4.1%
1996	755	+2.3%
2001	757	+0.3%
2006	722	−4.6%
2011	790	+9.4%

Population counts are not adjusted for boundary changes.
Source: Statistics Canada
