= Joseph Papin =

Canadian politician (1825–1862)

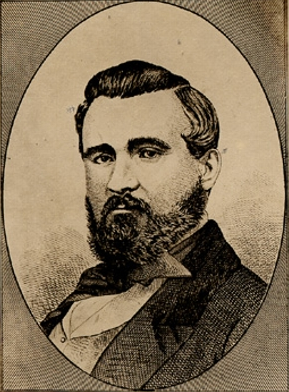

Member of the Legislative Assembly of the Province of Canada for L'Assomption
- In office 1854–1858

Personal details
- Born: December 14, 1825 L'Assomption, Lower Canada
- Died: February 23, 1862 (aged 36) L'Assomption, Canada East
- Party: Parti rouge

Joseph Papin (December 14, 1825 – February 23, 1862) was a lawyer and political figure in Canada East. He served on the Legislative Assembly of the Province of Canada and founded the Institut canadien de Montréal.

== Career ==
He was born in L'Assomption, Lower Canada in 1825, the son of a farmer, and studied at the Petit Séminaire de Montréal and the Collège de L'Assomption. Papin articled in law with Joseph-Ferréol Pelletier and was called to the bar in 1846. He helped found the Institut canadien de Montréal in 1844 and served as president in 1847. Papin also contributed to the newspaper L'Avenir. Papin signed the Montreal Annexation Manifesto of 1849 and took part in the movement lobbying for the abolition of seigneurial tenure. He served on the municipal council for Montreal in 1853 and 1854. In 1854, he was elected to the Legislative Assembly of the Province of Canada for L'Assomption and supported the parti rouge. During his time in the assembly, he proposed the creation of a school system that was not based on religious denominations. He was defeated in 1858 and returned to the practice of law. He married Sophie, the daughter of Jean-Baptiste Homier, a member of the municipal council, in 1857. In 1858, he became counsel for the town of Montreal. He died of cancer at L'Assomption in 1862 and was buried at Montreal.

== Family ==
In 1868, his wife married Ferdinand David, who served on the Montreal municipal council and in the Quebec legislative assembly. His daughter Marie-Louise married doctor Gaspard Archambault and became the mother of Jesuit priest Joseph-Papin Archambault. His wife's sister Léocadie married Alexandre Archambault, who also became a member of the legislative assembly.
