= Saint-Alexis, Quebec (village) =

District in Canada

The village municipality of Saint-Alexis (French pronunciation: [sɛ̃t‿alɛksi]) is a former village now part of the current municipality of Saint-Alexis, Quebec, Canada.

Prior to December 19, 2012, the village of Saint-Alexis was an independent municipality; on that date, it and the parish of Saint-Alexis were merged into the new municipality of Saint-Alexis.

== History ==
The sector was originally part of the parish of Saint-Alexis. In 1920, the sector became an independent municipality. In 2012, the village was merged with the parish to create the current municipality of Saint-Alexis.

== Demographics ==
Historical census populations – Saint-Alexis Village (1920-11-16 – 2012-12-19)

| Year | Pop. | ±% |
|---|---|---|
| 1921 | 523 | — |
| 1931 | 490 | −6.3% |
| 1941 | 426 | −13.1% |
| 1951 | 442 | +3.8% |
| 1956 | 489 | +10.6% |
| 1961 | 455 | −7.0% |

| Year | Pop. | ±% |
|---|---|---|
| 1966 | 442 | −2.9% |
| 1971 | 460 | +4.1% |
| 1976 | 474 | +3.0% |
| 1981 | 482 | +1.7% |
| 1986 | 461 | −4.4% |
| 1991 | 477 | +3.5% |

| Year | Pop. | ±% |
|---|---|---|
| 1996 | 503 | +5.5% |
| 2001 | 530 | +5.4% |
| 2006 | 556 | +4.9% |
| 2011 | 577 | +3.8% |

Source: Statistics Canada
