= Institut canadien de Québec =

Canadian organization

The Institut canadien de Québec (English; Canadian Institute of Quebec) was founded by Marc-Aurèle Plamondon on January 17, 1848, 4 years after the founding of the Institut canadien de Montréal. Originally a library open to its members, it became public in 1897. The institute manages the public library network of Quebec City.

== See also ==
- Institut canadien de Montréal
- History of Quebec
- Timeline of Quebec history
- History of Canada
