= Alfred Boisseau =

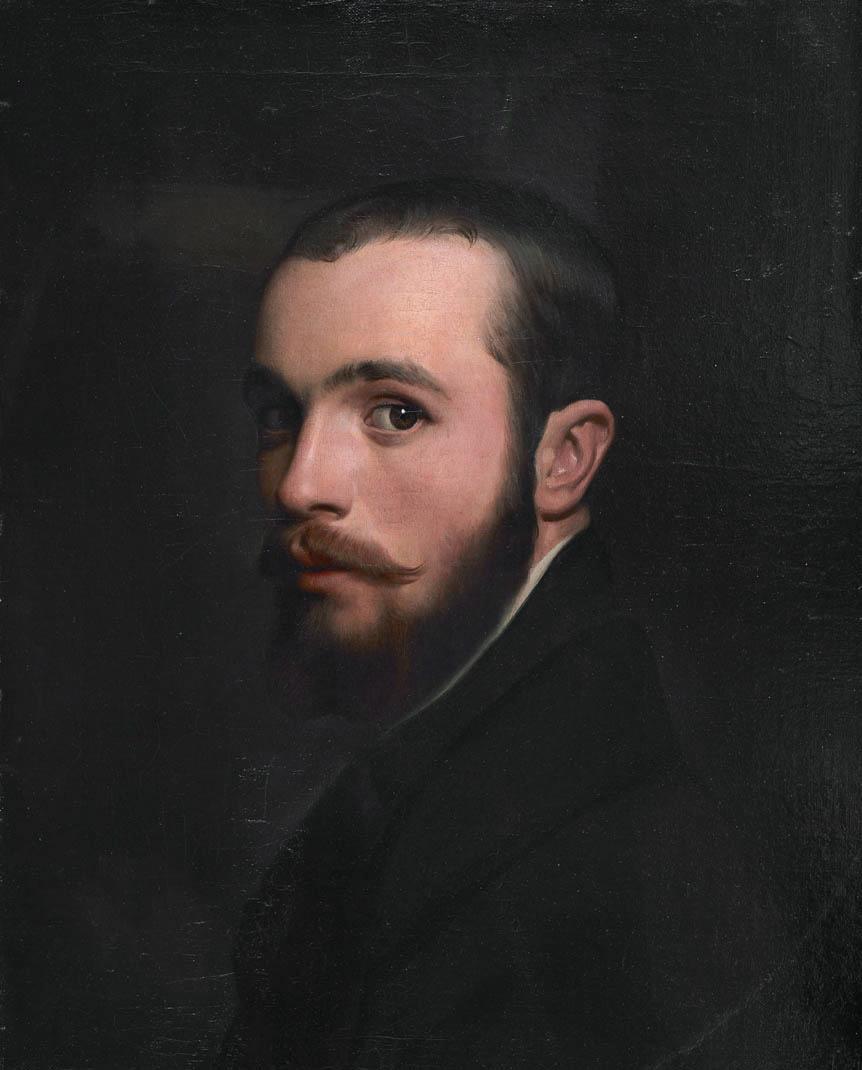
- Alfred Boisseau self-portrait 1842
- Born: February 1823; Paris, France
- Died: 7 October 1901 (aged 78); Buffalo, New York, U.S.
- Resting place: Buffalo, New York, U.S.
- Known for: Painter

Alfred Boisseau (1823–1901) was an American/Canadian artist who was born in Paris, France. He was known as a painter and photographer, who specialized in paintings of North American Natives and the West.

As a young man in his 20s, Boisseau immigrated to the United States, settling first in New Orleans, where his brother was working for the French consul. Except for a brief visit to Paris, he lived and worked in North America for the rest of his life. From 1848 Boisseau lived and worked in New York City and later in Cleveland. In 1860 he moved to Montreal and later to Manitoba, Canada in the western part of the country.

== Biography ==
Alfred Boisseau was born in Paris, France. He had an older brother who later served in government and the diplomatic corps. Becoming interested in art, Boisseau studied under Paul Delaroche, a fashionable Paris artist whose style combined neo-classicism and romanticism.

In his early 20s, Boisseau moved to New Orleans, Louisiana, living there from 1845 to 1847, while his brother served as secretary to the French consul. Boisseau painted his first works on Native American themes - mostly of members of the Choctaw nation who were historically based in Louisiana and Mississippi. He returned to Paris, where his painting Louisiana Indians Walking Along a Bayou (1847), now in the permanent collection of the New Orleans Museum of Art, was exhibited at the Paris Salon of 1848. After that Boisseau sailed back to the United States, settling in New York City. There he taught art from 1849 to 1852.

By 1852 Boisseau was working as a daguerreotypist in Cleveland, Ohio. He also advertised as a portrait and landscape painter, art teacher and art dealer.

In 1860 he moved to Canada, where he opened a succession of three photographic studios in Montreal. While working as secretary and bibliographer to the Institut canadien de Montréal, he completed several paintings.

Near the end of his life, he moved to western Canada, where he opened a studio in Brandon, Manitoba. There he produced paintings of Plains Indian natives. He returned to the United States and died in Buffalo, New York in 1901 where he is interred.

== Images ==
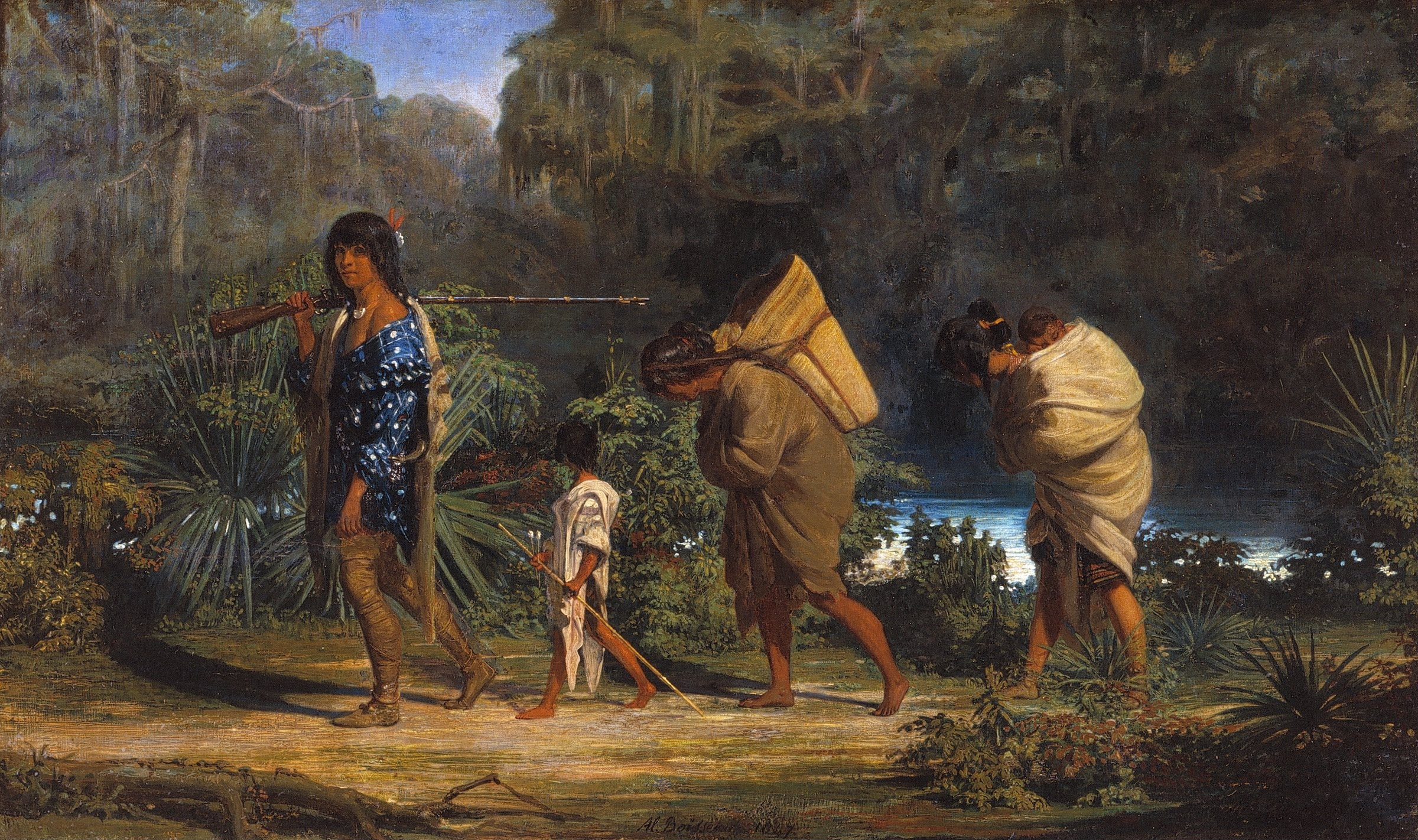
Louisiana Indians Walking Along a Bayou (1847), Alfred Boisseau

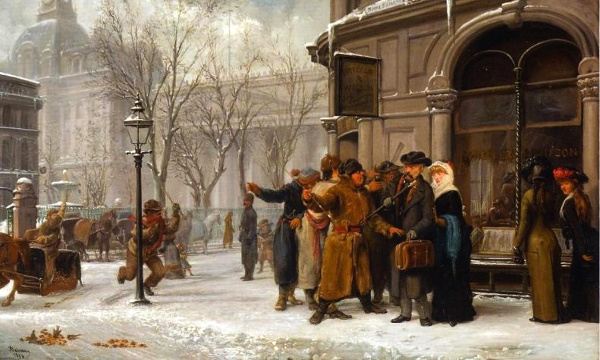
Montreal Street Scene (1890), Boisseau
