= Institut canadien de Montréal =

Montreal literary and political society (1844–1886)

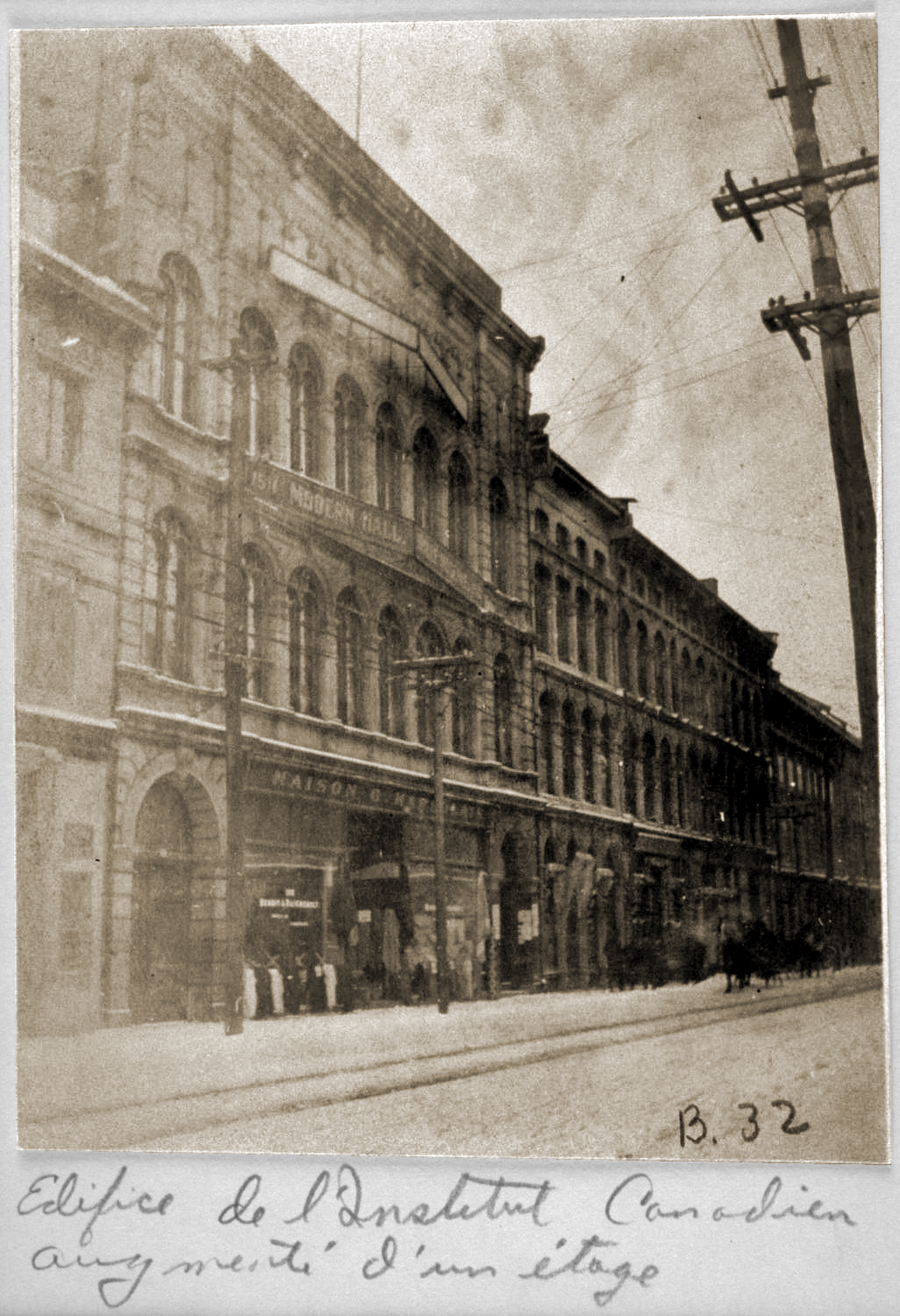
Building of the Institut canadien de Montreal on Notre-Dame Street between 1870 and 1920

The Institut canadien de Montréal (French pronunciation: [ɛ̃stity kanadjɛ̃ də mɔ̃ʁeal], lit. 'Canadian Institute of Montreal') was founded on 17 December 1844, by a group of 200 young liberal professionals in Montreal, Canada East, Province of Canada. The Institute provided a public library and debating room for its members. At the time, there were no French-language universities nor public libraries in Montreal. Between 1845 and 1871, some 136 lectures were held inside the institute's walls. The Institute eventually came into conflict with the Roman Catholic Church over the contents of its library. Partly as a result of the dispute with the Church, the Institute eventually folded in the 1870s.

== Origins ==
The institute was founded in 1844 as a literary and scientific institution, for the purposes of providing a library, reading-room, and other educational purposes. Joseph Papin was the first president. Inspired by the English "Mechanics Institutes" and literary societies in Europe, and influenced by the ideas of Alexandre Vattemare, it had the general goal of providing educational opportunities for young French-Canadian professionals. It also provided a means for them to assert their role in society and public affairs, which at this time were dominated by the anglophone minority. In 1853, it was incorporated by an Act of the Province of Canada. At the time of incorporation, the Institute had over 500 members, a library of over 2000 volumes, and a reading-room with newspapers and periodical publications. The success of the Institut became a model for similar instituts in other centres, notably the Institut canadien de Québec.

The institute was the source of the ideas defended by the Parti rouge. One of its mottos was: Justice pour nous, justice pour tous; Raison et liberté pour nous, raison et liberté pour tous ("Justice for us, justice for all; reason and liberty for us, reason and liberty for all"). Dedicated to a secular view of the world, the Institut aroused the suspicions and hostility of the Catholic church.

The library contained literary works by French romantic authors, such as Victor Hugo and Alphonse de Lamartine, and Enlightenment authors, such as Voltaire and Diderot, whose writings were judged immoral by the Catholic Church. Between 1845 and 1871, some 136 lectures were held inside the institute's walls.

== Dispute with the Church ==
In 1858, an issue arose about the contents of the library. At a meeting of the institute, some members proposed establishing a committee to review the library and to make a list of books which should not be allowed to remain in the library. This proposal was defeated by a considerable majority, which instead passed a resolution that the institute's library did not contain any improper books, that the institute was the sole judge of the morality of the books in the library, and that the existing committee of management was sufficient. Following this motion, a group of 158 members left the institute to found the Institut canadien-français de Montréal, which opted to obey the doctrine of the Catholic clergy and did not lend books which the Church judged immoral.

On 13 April 1858, the Roman Catholic Bishop of Montreal, Mgr Ignace Bourget, published a pastoral which was read in all the churches of his diocese. In the pastoral, he referred to the proceedings at the Institute and praised the conduct of the minority. He stated that the majority had fallen into two great errors: by declaring that the members of the Institute were the proper judges of the morality of the books in their library, contrary to the declaration at the Council of Trent which held that judging the morality of books is a function of the bishop; and by declaring that the library contained no immoral books, when in fact it contained books on the Church's Index of Prohibited Books. He pointed out that the Council of Trent had held that anyone who read or kept heretical works would incur sentence of excommunication, and that anyone who read or kept books forbidden on other grounds would be subject to severe punishment. He concluded by making an appeal to the members of the institute to alter their resolution, stating that otherwise, no Catholic would continue to belong to it.

The Institute did not rescind the resolution. In 1865, several members of the institute, including Joseph Guibord, appealed to Rome against this pastoral, but received no answer.

On July 7, 1869, Rome added the institute's Annuaire for the year 1868 to the Catholic Church's Index of prohibited books. Bishop Bourget published another pastoral letter, drawing attention to this decision and pointing out the Church had decreed that no Catholic was to belong to the Institute while it taught pernicious doctrines, nor to keep, publish or read the 1868 Annuaire. He stated that any person who persisted in keeping or reading the Annuaire, or in belonging to the institute, would be deprived of the sacrament, "même à l'article de la mort."

In response, the members of the institute on 23 September 1869 passed a resolution declaring that it did not teach any pernicious doctrine, and that the members of the institute, having learnt of the condemnation of the 1868 Annuaire, declared that they would submit purely and simply to this decree. Bishop Bourget responded in a letter condemning these resolutions as hypocritical, stating that the Institute had simultaneously passed a secret resolution in favour of religious tolerance, and stating that there would be no absolution for those who remained members of the institute.

== The Guibord Case ==
One of the founding members of the institute was a printer and typographer named Joseph Guibord. In 1869, Guibord died. Bourget refused to let Henrietta Brown, Guibord's widow, bury her husband's remains in the Catholic section of the Notre Dame des Neiges Cemetery because he was a member of the institute. The widow did not accept the decision and decided to bring the case to court. Henrietta Brown's lawyer, Joseph Doutre, also a member of the institute, ultimately won his case before the Judicial Committee of the Privy Council, at that time the court of last resort for the British Empire, including Canada, on November 21, 1874. The Guibord case became a point of great political and religious controversy.

== Closure of the Institute ==
The Institut canadien of Montreal gradually lost members and support. It closed the doors of its debating room in 1871, and the library closed in 1880. By 1886, La Presse reported that the Institut existed in name only. Only the Institut canadien de Québec, founded four years after that of Montreal, survived the Church's censorship by getting rid of certain works prohibited by the Roman Catholic Church.

In 2006, the Bibliothèque et Archives nationales du Québec (BAnQ) concluded a deal with the Fraser-Hickson Institute on the donation and transfer of property of the collection of the Institut canadien de Montréal. The latter had preserved it since 1885. Among the precious books of the collection were two editions of the Œuvres complètes de Voltaire (1785–1789), 36 volumes of L'Encyclopédie by Diderot and d'Alembert (1778–1781), 12 volumes of L'Esprit des journaux français et étrangers (1787–1792) and four volumes of Réunion des Tuileries au Louvre (1852–1857), a particular gift of Prince Napoléon to the Institut canadien.

== Members ==
=== Regular members ===
- Napoléon Aubin
- Joseph-Guillaume Barthe
- Alfred Boisseau
- Arthur Buies
- Francis Cassidy
- Louis-Antoine Dessaulles
- Antoine-Aimé Dorion
- Jean-Baptiste-Éric Dorion
- Joseph Doutre
- François-Xavier Garneau
- Antoine Gérin-Lajoie
- Joseph Guibord
- Joseph Papin
- Marc-Aurèle Plamondon
- Sir Wilfrid Laurier

=== External member ===
- Victor Hugo

== Awards ==
- Prix Condorcet, awarded posthumously in 1997

== See also ==
- History of Quebec
- Timeline of Quebec history
