= Parti rouge =

- Founded: 1847
- Dissolved: July 1, 1867
- Preceded by: Parti canadien
- Merged into: Liberal Party of Canada
- Headquarters: Montreal, Quebec
- Ideology: Anti-clericalism; Radicalism
- Colours: Red

The Parti rouge (French pronunciation: [paʁti ʁuʒ], "Red Party"; or French: Parti démocratique [paʁti demɔkʁatik], "Democratic Party") was a political group that contested elections in the Eastern section of the Province of Canada. It was formed around 1847 by radical French-Canadians; the party was inspired by the ideas of Louis-Joseph Papineau, the Institut canadien de Montréal, and the reformist movement led by the Parti patriote of the 1830s.

The Red Party did not experience electoral success in the same manner as the Blue Party, their electoral rivals in Canada East. Because of their anti-clerical beliefs, the Red Party was condemned by the Catholic Church, contributing to their lack of electoral success. The party did form government as part of a coalition with the Clear Grits and Liberals from Canada West on some occasions before confederation; however, it never held a majority in their section of the province. After Confederation, the party was dissolved, with members forming the Liberal Party of Canada at the federal level, and the Liberal Party of Quebec at the provincial level.

== History ==
The party was a successor to the Parti patriote, a radical political movement in Lower Canada responsible for the rebellions of 1837–1838. The reformist rouges did not believe that the 1840 Act of Union had truly granted a responsible government to former Upper and Lower Canada. They advocated important democratic reforms, republicanism, and secularism (separation of the state and the church). They were perceived as anti-clerical and radical by their political adversaries. Some of its members desired the abolition of the semi-feudal seigneurial system of land ownership, although Papineau was himself a seigneur and a vocal defender of the traditional system, which he wanted reformed, not abolished.

The elected rouges typically allied with the Clear Grits in the legislature of the Province of Canada. The party primarily sat in opposition to the Liberal-Conservative-Bleu government that governed the province for most of the period between the fall of the reform movement and confederation. However, the rouges did form government with the Clear Grits once, after the fall of the Macdonald-Cartier ministry on a vote of non-confidence. This resulted in the shortest-lived government in Canadian history, falling four days after it was called by the Governor-General. After Confederation, its more moderate members (notably including Sir Wilfrid Laurier, who would become Canada's first francophone Prime Minister) formed what became the Liberal Party of Canada in conjunction with their Upper Canadian Clear Grit allies.

== Ideology ==
The Parti rouge opposed the union of Upper Canada and Lower Canada into the United Province of Canada, and demanded its termination. When talks for Canadian Confederation began, its members either opposed the idea, or suggested a decentralized confederation. Some elements of the party advocated for full sovereignty, or joining with the United States, for the French-speaking part of Canada. They were opposed to the ultramontane politics of the Catholic clergy of Quebec and the Parti bleu.

=== Manifestos ===
The Red Party published the following manifestos:

- Manifeste du Comité constitutionnel de la réforme et du progrès, 1847 (online)
- Manifeste du Club national démocratique, 1849 (online)

== See also ==
- Canada
- Contributions to liberal theory
- Institut canadien de Montréal
- Liberal democracy
- Liberalism
- Liberalism in Canada
- Liberalism worldwide
- List of liberal parties
- Parti canadien - political party in Lower Canada, with similar ideological positions
- Politics of Quebec
