= Maskinongé =

Maskinongé may refer to:

- Maskinongé, Quebec
- Maskinongé Regional County Municipality
- Maskinongé (Province of Canada), an electoral district 1853–1867
- Maskinongé (federal electoral district), in Quebec 1867–1925
- Maskinongé (provincial electoral district), in Quebec 1867–present
- Muskellunge, a species of freshwater fish of North America
