= Georges Lafontaine =

Canadian politician (1857–1919)

Georges Lafontaine (1 February 1857 – 28 October 1919) was a politician in the Quebec, Canada. He served as an official opposition Member of the Legislative Assembly in the early twentieth century.

== Early life ==
He was born on February 1, 1857.

== Provincial Politics ==
Lafontaine, who was a Conservative won a 1904 provincial by-election in the district of Maskinongé. He was re-elected in the general election held in that same year and in 1908, even though each time the Liberals won nearly all the other seats.

In 1912 though Lafontaine lost re-election against Liberal Rodolphe Tourville.

== Federal Politics ==
Lafontaine also ran in 1917 in the federal district of Maskinongé, but finished third behind winner Hormisdas Mayrand of the Liberal Party and candidate Adolphe-Joseph Thibodeau.

== Death ==
He died on October 28, 1919, in Louiseville, Mauricie.

== Footnotes ==
National Assembly of Quebec
Preceded by Hector Caron (Liberal)	MLA, District of Maskinongé; 1904–1912	Succeeded by Rodolphe Tourville (Liberal)
