= Jean-Baptiste Meilleur =

Canadian politician

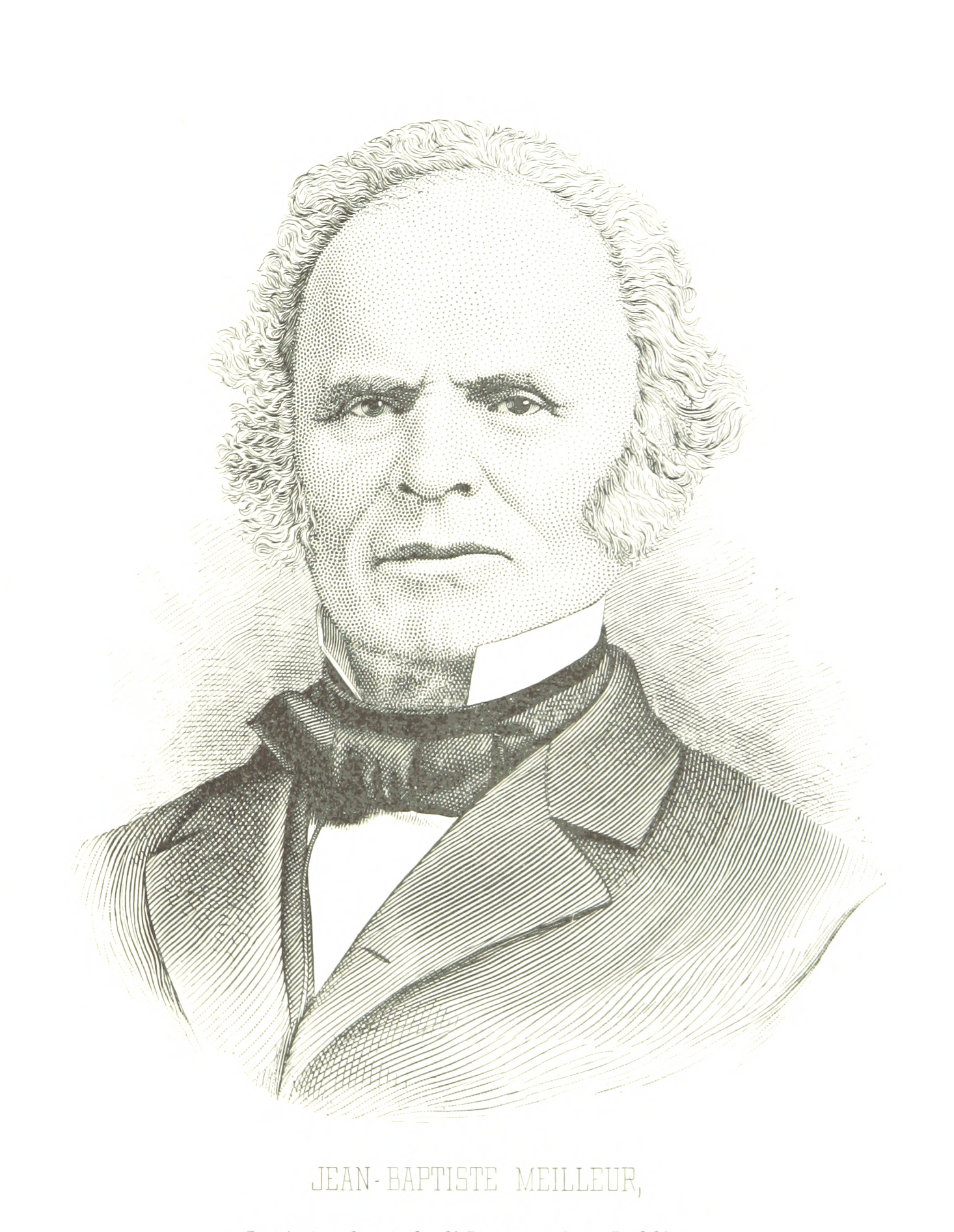
Jean-Baptiste Meilleur

Jean-Baptiste Meilleur (May 8, 1796 – December 6, 1878) was a medical doctor, educator and political figure in Lower Canada, Canada East, and Quebec.

He was born at Petite-Côte in Saint-Laurent, Lower Canada, on the Island of Montreal, in 1796, the son of Jean Meilleur, and studied at the Petit Séminaire de Montréal and an English school in Montreal. Meilleur studied at the Castleton Academy of Medicine and Middlebury College at Middlebury, in Vermont, and then at Dartmouth College, in New Hampshire, receiving an M.D. in 1825. He was qualified to practice in Lower Canada the following year and set up practice at L'Assomption. In 1827, he married Joséphine Éno, dit Deschamps, the daughter of Antoine Hénault.

He served as a lieutenant in the local militia, later being commissioned as a surgeon for the militia. He was named to the Medical Board for Montreal District and also was a justice of the peace and the postmaster at L'Assomption. In 1834, he was elected to the Legislative Assembly of Lower Canada for L'Assomption County. Meilleur supported the Parti patriote but did not support the use of force to achieve political change.

He helped to maintain a museum of natural history, originally established by Pierre Chasseur. Meilleur helped found the Collège de l'Assomption in 1832. He also taught in the local schools and produced the first chemistry textbook written by a Canadian and published in Canada for use in Canadian schools. In 1842, he was named first superintendent of education in Canada East. He resigned in June 1855.

Meilleur served as a president of the Saint-Jean-Baptiste Society of Montreal in 1857. In 1860, he published Mémorial de l’éducation du Bas-Canada, a history of education in the province. In 1870, he was named president of the Natural History Society of Quebec.

He died at Montreal in 1878 and was buried in the Notre Dame des Neiges Cemetery.

One daughter. Joséphine-Charlotte, married Georges-Isidore Barthe. Another daughter, Marie-Alphonsine, married Louis-Alphonse Boyer. Still another daughter, Herminie, married Jules Randolph Berthelot.
