= Rodolphe Tourville =

Canadian politician

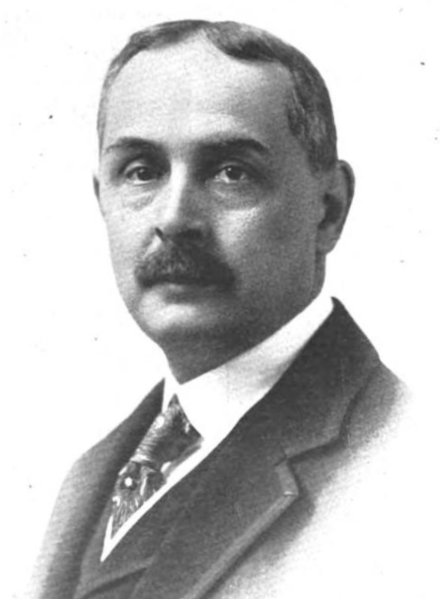

Member of the Legislative Assembly of Quebec
- In office 1912–1927
- Constituency: Maskinongé

Personal details
- Born: March 31, 1867 Montreal, Quebec
- Died: September 8, 1935 (aged 68) Outremont, Quebec
- Party: Liberal
- Spouse: Berthe Tourville (m. 1892)
- Occupation: Politician

Rodolphe Tourville (March 31, 1867 – September 8, 1935) was a politician in Quebec, Canada. He served as Member of the Legislative Assembly.

== Early life ==
He was born on March 31, 1867, in Montreal.

He married Berthe Tourville on June 6, 1892, and they had four children.

== Provincial politics ==
Tourville ran as a Liberal candidate to the Legislative Assembly of Quebec in 1912 in the district of Maskinongé. He won against Conservative incumbent Georges Lafontaine. He was re-elected in 1916, 1919 and 1923.

He did not run for re-election in 1927.

== Death ==
He died at his home in Outremont on September 8, 1935, and was entombed at the Notre Dame des Neiges Cemetery in Montreal.

== Footnotes ==
National Assembly of Quebec
| Preceded by Georges Lafontaine (Conservative) | MLA, District of Maskinongé; 1912 – 1927 | Succeeded by Joseph-William Gagnon (Liberal) |
