= Louis-Honoré Gauvreau =

Louis-Honoré Gauvreau (September 28, 1812 – October 20, 1858) was a physician and political figure in Canada East.

== Biography ==
He was born in Rivière-du-Loup (later Louiseville), the son of a Quebec merchant, and studied at the Séminaire de Nicolet. Gauvreau qualified to practice medicine in 1836 – he was among the first people to obtain an MD degree from McGill College – and set up practice in his home town. Gauvreau supported the Patriote cause in the region during the Lower Canada Rebellion. Afterwards, as part of the Montreal-based Association de la Délivrance, he helped collect funds so that those who had been exiled outside the country for their part in the uprising could return home. In 1839, he married Anne-Louise Dumoulin, the sister of Pierre-Benjamin Dumoulin. In 1858, he was elected to the Legislative Assembly of the Province of Canada for Maskinongé. He died in office later that year at Rivière-du-Loup (Louiseville).

Political offices
Preceded by Joseph-Édouard Turcotte, Parti bleu	MLA, District of Maskinongé; 1858–1858	Succeeded by George Caron, Parti bleu
