= Rémy Désilets =

Canadian politician (born 1952)

Rémy Désilets MNA

Government Member of the National Assembly of Quebec
- In office 1994–2003
- Monarch: Elizabeth II
- Governors General: Ray Hnatyshyn, Roméo LeBlanc, Adrienne Clarkson
- Prime Minister: Jean Chrétien
- Preceded by: Yvon Picotte
- Succeeded by: Francine Gaudet
- Constituency: Maskinongé (provincial electoral district)
- Majority: 48%

Parliamentary Secretary to the Minister for Health, Social Services, Youth Protection and Violence Prevention
- In office 2002–2003

Personal details
- Born: 1952-12-25 Drummondville, Centre-du-Québec
- Citizenship: Canadian
- Party: Parti Québécois
- Parents: Joseph Désilets (father); Gilberte Chabot (mother)
- Education: Bachelor of Arts (Physical Education), 1976; Certificate in Sports Training, 1978
- Alma mater: Université du Québec à Trois-Rivières.
- Occupation: Teacher of Physical Education and Politician

Rémy Désilets is a Quebec, Canada politician. He was a Member of the National Assembly.

== Background ==
He was born on December 27, 1952, in Drummondville, Centre-du-Québec and is an educator.

== Political career ==
Désilets ran as a Parti Québécois candidate in the provincial district of Maskinongé in 1994 and won. He succeeded Liberal incumbent Yvon Picotte who had just retired from politics.

He was re-elected in 1998 and served as Parliamentary Assistant from 2002 to 2003.

In 2003, he lost re-election against Liberal candidate Francine Gaudet.

He attempted a political comeback in 2007, but finished third, behind winner Jean Damphousse from the Action Démocratique du Québec and Gaudet who was running for re-election.

== Controversy ==
Désilets courted controversy in 2016 through an illegal contribution to a colleague's campaign fund, for which he was fined C$6,000.

== See also ==
- Politics of Quebec
- Quebec general elections
- Quebec Liberal Party

National Assembly of Quebec
Preceded by Yvon Picotte, Liberal	MNA, District of Maskinongé; 1994–2003	Succeeded by Francine Gaudet, Liberal
