= George Caron =

Canadian politician

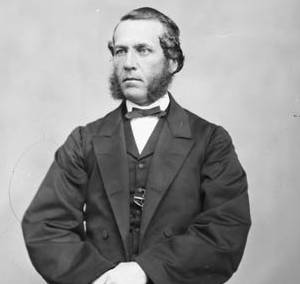
George Caron Source: Library and Archives Canada

George Caron (March 4, 1823 – May 14, 1902) was a Quebec businessman and political figure. He represented Maskinongé in the 1st Canadian Parliament as a Conservative member.

He was born in Rivière-du-Loup, Lower Canada in 1823 and studied at the Séminaire de Nicolet. Caron established himself in business as a merchant at Saint-Léon. He served as a lieutenant-colonel in the local militia and as a justice of the peace. He was elected to represent Maskinongé in an 1858 by-election held after the death of Louis-Honoré Gauvreau and reelected in 1861 but then defeated in the 1863 general election. He was elected again following Confederation and then ran unsuccessfully for the same seat in the House of Commons in the three general elections that followed.

He died in Saint-Léon in 1902.

His son Hector served as a member of the Legislative Assembly of Quebec.

Political offices
Preceded by Louis-Honoré Gauvreau, Parti bleu	MLA, District of Maskinongé; 1858–1863	Succeeded by Moïse Houde, Parti rouge
Parliament of Canada
Preceded by Federal district created in 1867	MP, District of Maskinongé; 1867–1872	Succeeded by Louis-Alphonse Boyer, Liberal
