= Alexis Lesieur Desaulniers =

Canadian politician (1837–1918)

Member of the Canadian Parliament for Maskinongé
- In office 1884–1887
- Preceded by: Frédéric Houde
- Succeeded by: Charles Jérémie Coulombe

Member of the Legislative Assembly of Quebec for Maskinongé
- In office 1867–1871
- Preceded by: District created in 1867
- Succeeded by: Moïse Houde

Personal details
- Born: August 31, 1837 Rivière du-Loup en Haut (Louiseville), Lower Canada
- Died: July 9, 1918 (aged 80) Montreal, Quebec
- Party: Conservative Party
- Other political affiliations: Conservative Party of Quebec
- Relations: Louis-Léon Lesieur Desaulniers, cousin Hector Caron, son-in-law
- Children: Arthur Lesieur Desaulniers

Alexis Lesieur Desaulniers (August 31, 1837 – July 9, 1918) was a Quebec lawyer and political figure. He represented Maskinongé in the House of Commons of Canada.

== Early background ==
He studied at the Séminaire de Nicolet, Université Laval in Montreal and McGill University. He was called to the bar in 1861. He was the father of Arthur Lesieur Desaulniers, who was a Member of the House of Commons from 1917 to 1930 for the district of Champlain.

== City Politics ==
Desaulniers served as a Councilmember in Louiseville in 1891.

== Provincial Legislature ==
Desaulniers was elected as a member of the Conservative Party to the Legislative Assembly of Quebec in 1867 for the district of Maskinongé. He lost re-election in 1871, against Liberal Moïse Houde. He tried to make a comeback in 1875, but was defeated again.

== House of Commons ==
Desaulniers also tried to be elected to the House of Commons in 1878, 1884, 1887, 1900. He was successful on his third attempt only, winning a by-election. He represented the district of Maskinongé from 1884 to 1887 and sat with members of the Conservative Party.
