= Marc Plante =

Canadian politician

Marc H. Plante

Member of the National Assembly of Quebec for Maskinongé
- In office April 7, 2014 – August 29, 2018
- Preceded by: Jean-Paul Diamond
- Succeeded by: Simon Allaire

Personal details
- Party: Quebec Liberal Party

Marc H. Plante is a Canadian politician in Quebec, who was elected to the National Assembly of Quebec in the 2014 election. He represents the electoral district of Maskinongé as a member of the Quebec Liberal Party.

Prior to his election to the legislature, Plante was a constituency assistant to Francine Gaudet and Jean-Paul Diamond, his predecessors as MNA for Maskinongé.
