= Arthur Mignault =

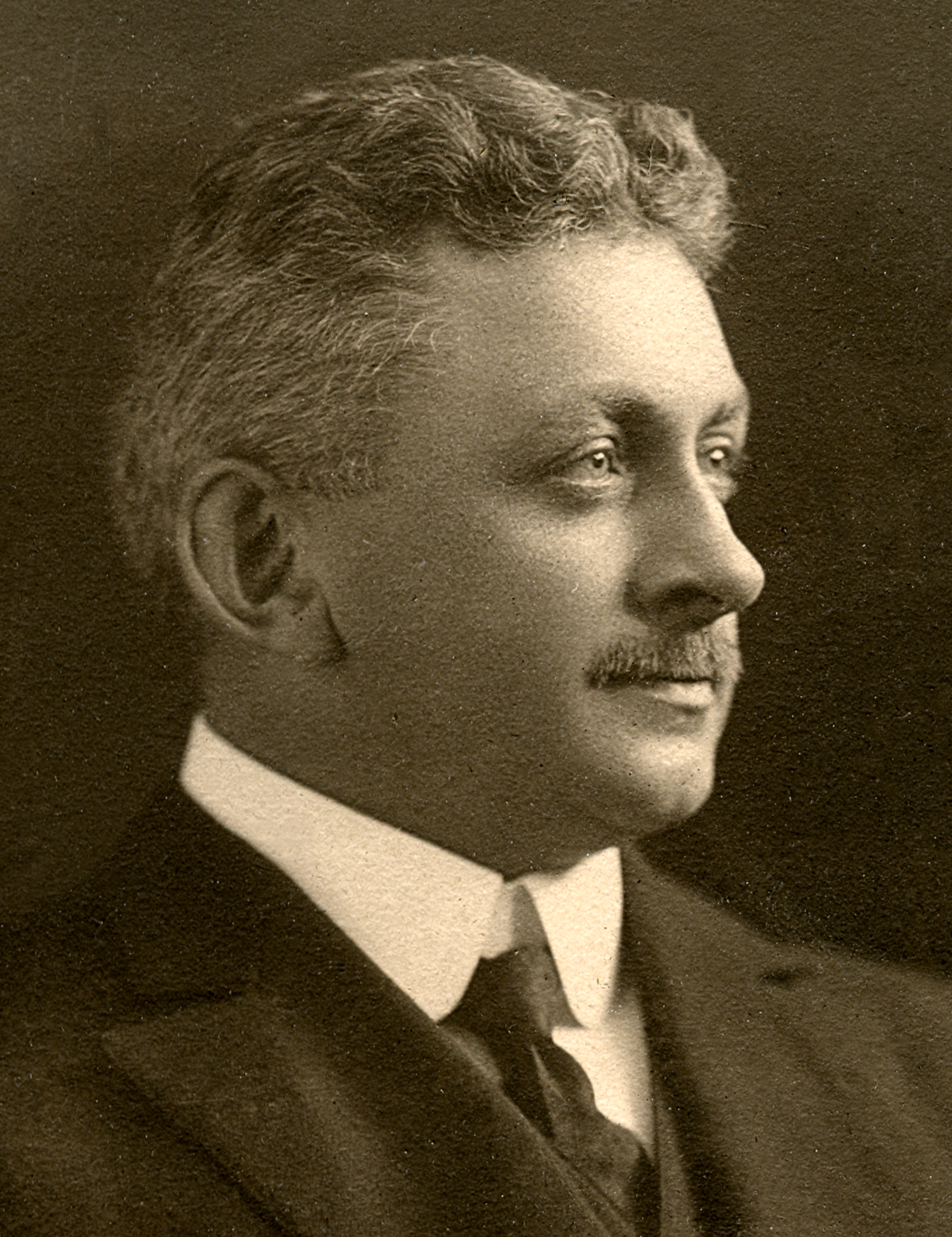
- Colonel Arthur Mignault
- Born: 29 September 1865; S^{t}-Denis, Canada East
- Died: 26 April 1937 (aged 71); Montreal, Quebec, Canada
- Burial place: Cimetière Notre-Dame-des-Neiges
- Spouse: Béatrice Boyer (m. 1912)
- Children: 1
- Relatives: Arthur Boyer, father-in-law Henri Julien, friend
- Military career
- Allegiance: Dominion of Canada
- Branch: Canadian Army Medical Corps
- Service years: 1909–1918
- Rank: Honorary Brigadier General
- Unit: Royal Canadian Army Medical Corps
- Awards: (France) Legion of Honour

Arthur Mignault, MD (29 September 1865 – 26 April 1937) was a French Canadian pharmaceutical entrepreneur, physician and colonel of the Royal Canadian Army Medical Corps, serving in the First World War. He is the founder of the Royal 22^{e} Régiment.

== Early life ==
Mignault was born in S^{t}-Denis, Canada East in 1865. (Note: Mignault seems to have believed that he was born on 29 September 1866, a date he gave to Canadian military authorities upon volunteering. However, his baptism record is dated back 29 September 1865 and mentions he was born on that day. See the birth record on Wikimedia Commons here.) He graduated from medical school at the Université de Montréal in 1888, leaving shortly thereafter to practice in Maine. Upon returning to Montreal in 1896, Mignault started a career in the pharmaceutics business. He made his fortune by selling what he marketed as the petites pilules rouges (little red pills), a drug against anemia, intended for women's use. A sports enthusiast and a horse racing amateur, he cofounded in 1901 the first French Canadian polo club.

Mignault was a friend of artist and cartoonist Henri Julien. The latter's well-known gouache painting Le vieux de '37 seems to have been sponsored by Mignault, and as of 2009, the work is still in the family's personal collection. It has been hypothesized that the man pictured be Mignault's grandfather, Joseph-Édouard Mignault, a notary from Arthur's hometown who participated in the Battle of Saint-Denis of 1837 as a Patriote quartermaster.

Mignault gained notoriety as a philanthropist in 1909, as he offered some of his lands in downtown Montreal to establish a playground for poverty-stricken children.

In 1912, he married Béatrice Boyer, daughter of Canadian senator Arthur Boyer, and granddaughter of the wealthy Quebec land owner Louis Boyer. They had a single daughter, Valérie, born in 1914.

== Military career ==
In 1909, Mignault was granted a militia commission in the rank of surgeon lieutenant with the 65th Regiment "Carabiniers Mont-Royal" (now Les Fusiliers Mont-Royal).

Mignault's communication with Prime Minister Robert Borden which ensued in the creation of the 22nd Battalion, CEF

=== Founding of French Canadian army units ===
In 1914, Mignault communicated with Prime Minister Robert Borden to propose the establishment of a solely French Canadian battalion within the Canadian Expeditionary Force (CEF). According to Mignault, this would allow Canadians of French extraction to circumvent the language barrier of the English-speaking battalions. To support his cause, Mignault offered the significant amount of C$50,000. He expressed the desire to accompany the unit overseas, should it be formed. Despite Canada's relatively modest population, Borden had recently committed his country into providing half a million soldiers for the Allied cause. Realizing the difficulty of raising such an army on a voluntary basis, Borden conceded. Accordingly, on 14 October 1914, the exclusively French Canadian 22nd Battalion, CEF, was formed.

Mignault proved himself right as his recruitment campaign turned out to be a considerable success. Through French Canadian newspapers and media hype, the ranks of the newly formed battalion were filled in less than a month. Shortly thereafter, content of his recent achievement, Mignault moved to personally finance two other French Canadian battalions, the 41st and the 57th. However, these two lesser-known units fell short of experienced French Canadian officers: most of them had already been moved from English-speaking units to the 22nd Battalion.

=== Overseas ===
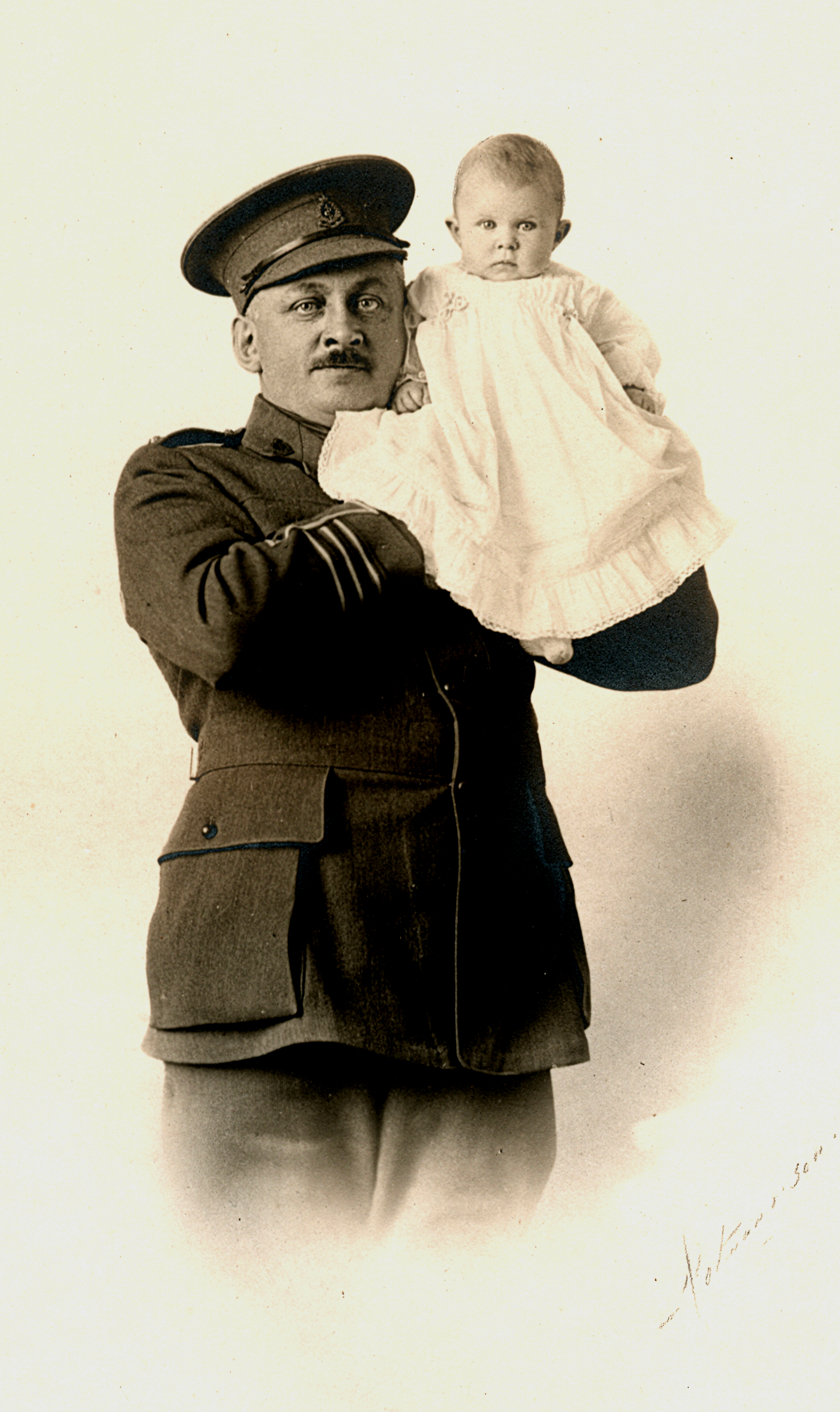
Mignault and his daughter Valérie in April 1915, soon before his departure

While Mignault soon realized that he would not be put in charge of a battalion by financing infantry units, as such was clearly his desire, he opted to found and finance a medical unit.

By early spring 1915, Mignault had encouraged the Canadian government to settle down a solely French Canadian stationary hospital near the German frontlines in eastern France. He argued that such an establishment could improve Canadian medical implication on the Western Front, as French-speaking medical personnel would naturally better fit, within French lines, than their English counterparts. The government recognized the need to improve Canada's medical efficiency in France. The fourth Canadian Stationary Hospital would soon commence its recruitment campaign. Mignault was put in command, and was promoted to the rank of lieutenant colonel. By November 1915, Mignault, along with 100 men, had reached the commune of Saint-Cloud in suburban Paris, where the hospital would be deployed.

On 15 April 1916, a month after the first convoy of wounded French soldiers had arrived, French President Raymond Poincaré officially inaugurated the hospital. Upon meeting him, Poincaré opined that Mignault "looked Norman". Several French figures attended the ceremony, namely the Canadian Minister of Overseas Military Forces, Sir George Perley, prominent historian and member of the Académie Française, Gabriel Hanotaux, chief of French medical service, Justin Godart, and High Commissioner of Canada in Paris, Philippe Roy.

The hospital's capacity was initially set at 250 beds, but increasing cases of syphilis and gonorrhea among French soldiers led to expand its capacity to a full 600. To meet the increased activity, No. 4 Canadian Stationary Hospital was re-organized and re-designated as No. 8 Canadian General Hospital of the Canadian Army Medical Corps. Simultaneously, Mignault was promoted colonel.

However, of bold nature, Mignault did run into some trouble. In 1916, Canadian authorities had to unravel and discharge several goods and services he purchased without authorization of relevant French firms. Embarrassed, Canadian authorities considered convening Mignault to court-martial, but failed to follow through. He was however called back to Canada in November of that year.

=== End of war ===
Upon his return home, Mignault was appointed in charge of military recruitment of French-speaking Canada. In spite of his humiliating dismissal from the field, he quite soon received several honours and distinctions. As Major General Sir Eugène Fiset congratulated him for his services in the name of the Canadian Ministry of Militia and Defence, France beset him the title of Knight of the Legion of Honour.

Mignault was transferred to Canada's military reserve following the enactment of the conscription of 1917. Designated a federal recruiting agent at the beginning of that year, he pursued his mobilising activities among French Canadians. Nevertheless, his military career came to a definite end on 15 September 1918, as he had entangled himself in another predicament with Canadian military authorities.

== Later life ==
Despite his expulsion from the army in 1918, following the end of the war, Mignault continued to promote the military service to young French Canadian physicians. In the years following the war, he cadged the title of Brigadier General to the medical corps, but saw his entreaties refused time and again. Nonetheless, towards the end of his life, his services in World War I were indeed recognised, and, a month before his death in 1937, he was granted the honorary rank of Brigadier General. He was the first French Canadian to be promoted to such rank in the Royal Canadian Army Medical Corps.

Mignault died in Montreal on 26 April 1937.

== Legacy ==
In 1989, in central Laval, a street was named Rue Arthur-Mignault in the doctor's honour.

== See also ==
- Military history of Canada during World War I
- Royal Canadian Army Medical Corps
- Royal 22nd Regiment
