= Love and Magnets =

2004 French Canadian romantic comedy film

- French: Les Aimants
- Directed by: Yves Pelletier
- Written by: Yves Pelletier
- Produced by: Gabriel Pelletier; Nicole Robert
- Starring: Isabelle Blais; Sylvie Moreau
- Cinematography: Pierre Jodoin
- Edited by: Yvann Thibaudeau
- Music by: Carl Bastien; Dumas
- Production company: Go Films
- Distributed by: Alliance Atlantis
- Release date: 1 October 2004
- Running time: 91 minutes
- Country: Canada
- Language: French

Love and Magnets (French: Les Aimants) is a French Canadian romantic comedy film, directed by Yves P. Pelletier and released in 2004. The film's original French title is a pun on its themes, as the word "aimant" means magnet when used as a noun, but "loving" or "affectionate" when used as an adjective.

The film stars Isabelle Blais as Julie, a woman returning to Montreal after five years living in Guatemala with her now ex-boyfriend. She moves in with her sister and brother-in-law, Jeanne (Sylvie Moreau) and Noël (David Savard), an unhappily married couple who rarely actually see each other, communicating almost entirely through notes under fridge magnets; Jeanne is, in fact, having an extramarital affair with musician Manu (Emmanuel Bilodeau). When Jeanne decides to leave for a romantic weekend with Manu, she enlists Julie to keep leaving notes for Noël so he won't notice that she's gone — but Julie, hoping to help rekindle Jeanne and Noël's relationship, takes the opportunity to write the fake notes more romantically.

The film's music was composed by Carl Bastien and Dumas, although Blais, also a singer with the band Caïman Fu, performed the vocals on three songs.

Blais received a Genie Award nomination for Best Actress, and Moreau for Best Supporting Actress, at the 25th Genie Awards in 2005. The film received seven Prix Jutra nominations, including Best Picture, winning for Best Screenplay (Pelletier), Best Supporting Actress (Moreau) and Best Music (Bastien and Dumas).
