= Dumas (musician) =

Canadian musician

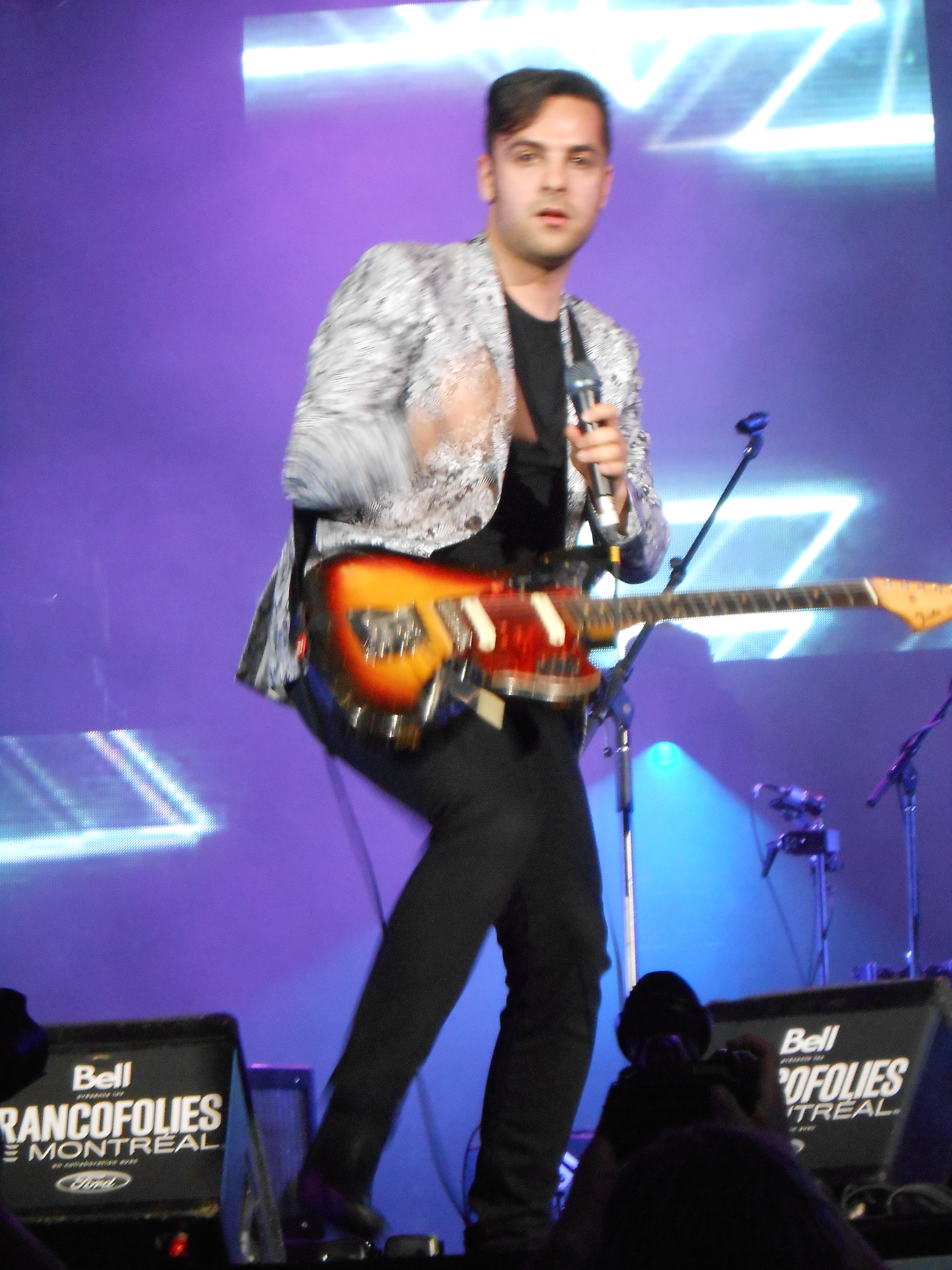
- Dumas in 2013

Background information
- Born: Steve Dumas; Victoriaville, Quebec, Canada
- Genres: Indie rock
- Occupation: Musician
- Instruments: Vocals; guitar
- Years active: 2001–present
- Website: dumasmusique.ca

Dumas (born Steve Dumas) is a Canadian singer and musician from Victoriaville, Quebec.

== Career ==
Dumas released his first album Dumas in 2001, when he was 21. His second album, Le cours des jours, made him more well-known. The album includes contributions from Marie-Annick Lépine from the group Les Cowboys Fringants on two songs. In 2004, Carl Bastien and Dumas released the soundtrack to the film Les Aimants by Yves P. Pelletier.

Dumas' 2012 album L'heure et l'endroit debuted at number 11 on the Canadian Albums Chart.

Dumas has also produced and written music for other artists, as well as composing for films. He wrote the theme songs for the films This Is Our Cup and Love and Magnets (2004).

Additionally, he has contributed vocals to several commercials and TV shows, while also collaborating in some of them as a columnist.

In February 2018, Dumas released Nos idéaux and launched a solo tour of Quebec and Europe.

Dumbas released his twelfth full-length studio album, Cosmologie, on 27 January 2023.

== Discography ==
- Dumas (2001)
- Le cours des jours (2003)
- Ferme la radio (EP, 2004)
- Les Aimants en musique (Collaboration with Carl Bastien, soundtrack from the film Love and Magnets – 2004)
- Fixer le temps (2006)
- Nord (2008)
- Rouge (2009)
- Demain (2009)
- Au bout du monde (2009)
- Traces (2009)
- L'heure et l'endroit (2012)
- Dumas (2014)
- Un jours sur Mars (2016)
- Nos idéaux (2018)
- Cosmologie (2023)

== Awards and recognition ==
- 2005 – Prix Rapsat-Lelièvre
- 2005 – Jutra Award best music for the film Love and Magnets (Les Aimants)
- 2005 – Félix Award – Spectacle of the year – Author-composer-interpreter for Dumas en solo
- 2005 – Félix Award – Album of the year – Original soundtrack for Les Aimants en musique
