= Charles Jérémie Coulombe =

Canadian politician

Member of the Canadian Parliament for Maskinongé
- In office 1887–1891
- Preceded by: Alexis Lesieur Desaulniers
- Succeeded by: Joseph-Hormisdas Legris

Personal details
- Born: October 23, 1846 St-Cuthbert, Canada East
- Died: December 1, 1938 (aged 92) L'Assomption, Quebec, Canada
- Party: Conservative
- Occupation: physician

Charles-Jérémie Coulombe (October 23, 1846 – December 1, 1938) was a physician and political figure in Quebec. He represented Maskinongé in the House of Commons of Canada from 1887 to 1891 as a Conservative member.

He was born in St-Cuthbert, Canada East, and educated at the college in L'Assomption. In 1879, he married Marie Noémi Bernier. He served as a major in the militia. Coulombe was an unsuccessful candidate for a seat in the House of Commons in 1884. His attempts at reelection in 1891 and 1896 were unsuccessful.
