= Yvon Picotte =

Canadian politician (1941–2024)

Yvon Picotte (October 27, 1941 – May 15, 2024) was a Canadian politician from Quebec.

== Life and career ==
Picotte was a five-term Liberal member of the National Assembly, who represented the electoral district of Maskinongé from 1973 to 1994. He also was in charge of several portfolios in the second cabinet of premier Robert Bourassa, including tourism and agriculture.

From 2002 to 2008, Picotte was a supporter of the Action démocratique du Québec. From 2004 to 2006, he served as President of that party. In May 2006, he made embarrassing comments about Parti Québécois Leader André Boisclair. Boisclair had decided not to run in a by-election for the district of Sainte-Marie–Saint-Jacques, the district where he lives and that is well known for its large gay population. Accusing Boisclair of being a coward, Picotte jokingly said that the riding would fit Boisclair, who is openly gay, like a glove (comme un gant). Many journalists criticized Picotte, saying his comment sounded homophobic. Within days, Picotte apologized.

In October 2008, he announced that he would vote for local Liberal candidate and friend Jean-Paul Diamond in the next provincial election.

Picotte was the director of Pavillon du Nouveau Point de vue, an addiction intervention centre.

Picotte died on May 15, 2024, at the age of 82. He had been diagnosed with esophageal cancer six months earlier.

== Footnotes ==
National Assembly of Quebec
Preceded by Rémi Paul (Union Nationale)	MNA, District of Maskinongé; 1970–1994	Succeeded by Rémy Désilets (PQ)
Government offices
Preceded by Jacques Brassard (PQ)	Minister of Recreation, Wildlife & Fisheries; 1985–1989	Succeeded by Gaston Blackburn (Liberal)
Preceded by Marcel Léger (PQ)	Minister of Tourism; 1985–1987	Succeeded by Michel Gratton (Liberal)
Preceded by Pierre Paradis (Liberal)	Minister of Municipal Affairs; 1989–1990	Succeeded by Claude Ryan (Liberal)
Preceded by Michel Pagé (Liberal)	Minister of Agriculture & Fisheries; 1990–1994	Succeeded by Marcel Landry (PQ)
Party political offices
Preceded by Guy Laforest	President of Action démocratique du Québec; 2004–2006	Succeeded by Gilles Taillon
