= Eugène Desrochers =

Canadian politician

Member of Parliament for Maskinongé
- In office December 1921 – September 1925
- Preceded by: Hormisdas Mayrand
- Succeeded by: riding dissolved

Personal details
- Born: 15 October 1885 Sainte-Agathe, Quebec
- Died: 25 November 1958 (aged 73) Montreal, Quebec
- Party: Liberal
- Spouse: Régina Boivin
- Profession: merchant, trader

Eugène Desrochers (15 October 1885 – 25 November 1958) was a Liberal party member of the House of Commons of Canada. He was born in Sainte-Agathe, Quebec and became a merchant and trader. From 1919 to 1922, he was mayor of Saint-Didace, Quebec.

The son of Romuald Desrochers and Lèda Marcotte, he was educated at the Séminaire de Trois-Rivières and entered business at Saint-Didace, Quebec. In 1905, Desrochers married Régina Boivin.

He was elected to Parliament at the Maskinongé riding in the 1921 general election. After serving only one federal term, the 14th Canadian Parliament, Desrochers left the House of Commons and did not seek another term in the 1925 federal election.
