= Louis-Alphonse Boyer =

Canadian politician

Louis Alphonse Boyer
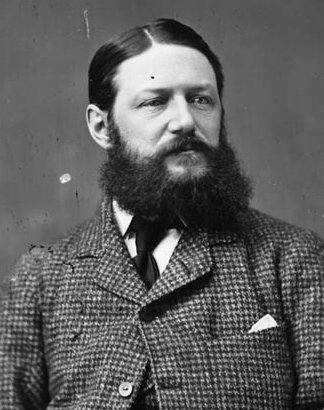

Member of the Canadian Parliament for Maskinongé
- In office 1872–1878
- Preceded by: George Caron
- Succeeded by: Frédéric Houde

Personal details
- Born: May 31, 1839 Montreal, Lower Canada
- Died: May 29, 1916 (aged 76)
- Party: Liberal
- Occupation: businessman lumber merchant

Louis-Alphonse Boyer (May 31, 1839 – May 29, 1916) was a Quebec merchant and political figure. He represented Maskinongé in the House of Commons of Canada as a Liberal member from 1872 to 1878.

He was born in Montreal, the son of Louis Boyer and Aurélie Mignault, and was educated at the Chambly and Jesuit Colleges. Boyer was the head of a lumber firm and a director of the Royal Canadian Insurance Company and of Banque Ville Marie. He also served as mayor of St-Lambert. In 1865, he married Alphonsine Meilleur, the daughter of Jean-Baptiste Meilleur. Boyer ran unsuccessfully in the federal riding of Jacques Cartier in 1904. Boyer operated a model farm in St-Lambert. He was flour inspector for Montreal from 1878 to 1888.

His brother Arthur was a member of the Quebec assembly and the Canadian senate.
