= Jean-Paul Diamond =

Canadian politician (1940–2025)

MNA for Maskinongé
- In office 2008–2014
- Preceded by: Jean Damphousse
- Succeeded by: Marc Plante

Personal details
- Born: 9 April 1940 Charette, Quebec, Canada
- Died: 7 November 2025 (aged 85)
- Party: Liberal
- Spouse: Roxanne McMurray

Jean-Paul Diamond (9 April 1940 – 7 November 2025) was a Canadian politician in the province of Quebec, who was elected to represent the riding of Maskinongé in the National Assembly of Quebec in the 2008 provincial election. He was a member of the Quebec Liberal Party.

Diamond was a prefect for ten years for the Maskinongé Regional County Municipality in the Mauricie region and was also mayor and councillors for the municipality of Saint-Alexis-des-Monts. He was an administrative member of the Fédération québécoise des municipalités. He also worked for the Cabinet of former Agriculture Minister Yvon Picotte and as vice-president of a local construction and paving company for over ten years.

Diamond died on 7 November 2025, at the age of 85.
