= Frédéric Houde =

Canadian politician (1847–1884)

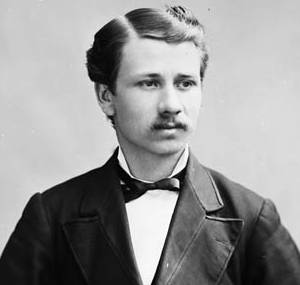

Member of the Canadian Parliament for Maskinongé
- In office 1878–1884
- Preceded by: Louis-Alphonse Boyer
- Succeeded by: Alexis Lesieur Desaulniers

Personal details
- Born: September 23, 1847 Saint-Antoine-de-la-Rivière-du-Loup (Louiseville), Canada East
- Died: November 15, 1884 (aged 37) Saint-Antoine-de-la-Rivière-du-Loup (Louiseville), Quebec
- Party: Nationalist
- Relations: Moïse Houde, uncle

Frédéric Houde (September 23, 1847 – November 15, 1884) was a Canadian journalist, newspaper editor and political figure in Quebec. He represented Maskinongé in the House of Commons of Canada from 1878 to 1884 as a Nationalist Conservative member.

He was born in Saint-Antoine-de-la-Rivière-du-Loup, Canada East, the son of Antoine Houde and Angèle Descoteaux, and was educated at the Séminaire de Nicolet. In 1868, he became an associate editor for Le Constitutionnel in Trois-Rivières. From 1869 to 1875, he worked on a number of French language newspapers in New England. In 1871 Houde founded L’Avenir national at St Albans. In 1874, he married Catherine Dougherty. After his return to Quebec, Houde became editor of Le Nouveau Monde; he became owner in 1879. In 1882, he published an article critical of Archbishop Elzéar-Alexandre Taschereau. He was asked by Bishop Édouard-Charles Fabre to retract the article but instead chose to leave journalism. Houde served as a lieutenant-colonel for the Trois-Rivières militia. First published in le 'Nouveau Monde', during his life, his historical novel 'Le Manoir mystérieux' was published in book form in 1913.

He died in office at the age of 37 after contracting tuberculosis.

His uncle Moïse Houde represented Maskinongé in the legislative assemblies for the Province of Canada and for Quebec.
