= Isabelle Blais =

Canadian actress

Isabelle Blais MNA
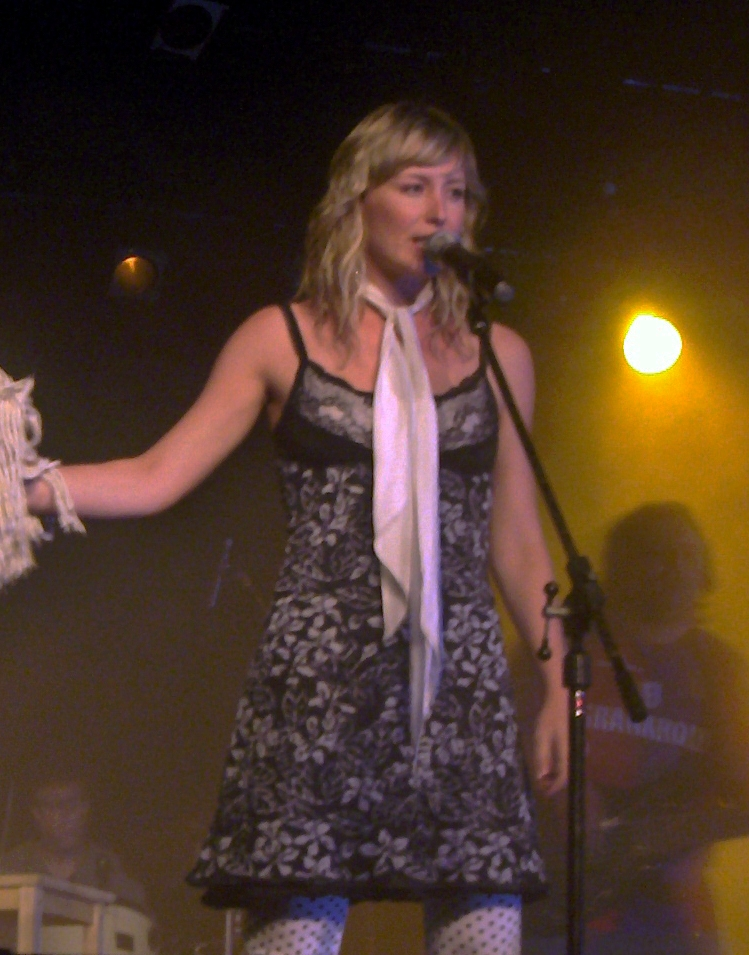
- Blais performing at Trois-Pistoles French Immersion School in 2006.

Member of the National Assembly for Maskinongé
- Incumbent
- Assumed office October 5, 2026
- Preceded by: Simon Allaire

Personal details
- Born: 1975 (age 50–51) Trois-Rivières, Quebec, Canada
- Party: Parti Québécois
- Spouse: Pierre-Luc Brillant

Isabelle Sophie Emilie Blais MNA (born 1975) is a Canadian film and television actress, singer and politician who is the Member of the National Assembly of Quebec for Maskinongé.

== Biography ==
Isabelle Blais was born in 1975, in Trois-Rivières, Quebec. She is a graduate of the Montreal campus of the Conservatoire de musique et d'art dramatique du Québec. She quickly charmed critics by her stage interpretation of Juliet in Romeo and Juliet, and in 2001, won their attention for her role in Soft Shell Man by André Turpin.

In 2002, she appeared in Confessions of a Dangerous Mind by George Clooney. In 2003, she was awarded a Jutra Award for "Best Supporting Actress" for her role in Québec-Montréal by Ricardo Trogi. In the same year, appeared in The Barbarian Invasions, by Denys Arcand. In 2004, she appeared in a leading role in Les Aimants, by Yves Pelletier, for which she was nominated for a second Jutra Award, for Best Actress, as well as being nominated for a Genie Award for Best Performance by an Actress in a Leading Role. In 2007, she appeared in a supporting role in Sur la trace d'Igor Rizzi, by Noël Mitrani.

Isabelle is also a singer in the Québécois rock group Caïman Fu.

In 2010, she returned to cinema in the language of Molière with Yves Pelletier 's new film, Le Baiser du barbu, as well as in the language of Shakespeare thanks to her participation in the film Le Prix à payer by Deborah Chow.

On 26 April 2026, she was nominated by the Parti Québécois to be their candidate for the National Assembly of Quebec in Maskinongé in the 2026 Quebec general election. She won the election.

== Discography ==
- 2003 – Caïman Fu
- 2006 – Les charmes du quotidien
- 2008 – Drôle d'animal

== Filmography ==
- 2000 – The Three Madeleines (Les fantômes des trois Madeleines): Jeanne
- 2001 – Soft Shell Man (Un crabe dans le tête): Marie
- 2002 – Confessions of a Dangerous Mind : Chuck's Date No. 2
- 2002 – Québec-Montréal
- 2002 – Savage Messiah
- 2003 – The Barbarian Invasions: Sylvaine
- 2004 – Machine Gun Molly (Monica la mitraille): Sylvana
- 2004 – Love and Magnets (Les Aimants)
- 2005 - Saint Martyrs of the Damned (Saints-Martyrs-des-Damnés)
- 2007 – On the Trail of Igor Rizzi (Sur la trace d'Igor Rizzi)
- 2007 – Bluff
- 2008 – Borderline: Kiki
- 2010 – The High Cost of Living: Nathalie
- 2010 – Face Time (Le Baiser du barbu): Vicky
- 2015 – Blue Thunder (Bleu tonnerre)
- 2017 – Tadoussac
- 2018 – The Nest (Le nid)
- 2022 – How to Get Your Parents to Divorce (Pas d'chicane dans ma cabane!)
- 2022 – Invincible
- 2024 – Sisters and Neighbors! (Nos belles-sœurs)

=== Television ===
- 2005 – Human Trafficking Helena
- 2006 – Answered by Fire: Julie Fortin
- 2006–2010 – CA: Sarah Lamontagne
- 2012–2014 – Trauma: Véronique Bilodeau
- 2016 – St. Nickel
- 2017 – Faits Divers

=== Video games ===
- 2014 – Watch Dogs: Clara Lille (voice)

== Electoral record ==
2026 Quebec general election: Maskinongé
** Preliminary results — Not yet official **
Party	Candidate	Votes	%	±%
Parti Québécois	Isabelle Blais	11,099	31.96	
Conservative	Marc-André Cloutier	9,390	27.04	
Coalition Avenir Québec	Simon Allaire	6,830	19.67	
Liberal	Nancy Mignault	4,606	13.26	
Québec solidaire	Simon Poitte	2,365	6.81	
Parti nul	Jérôme Dumont	147	0.42	
Climat Québec	Louise Gosselin	125	0.36	
Independent	Gilles Brodeur	89	0.26	
Démocratie directe	Claude Ladouceur	79	0.23	
Total valid votes				
Total rejected ballots				
Turnout			72.85	
Electors on the lists			–	–
Source: Élections Québec
