= Maskinongé (provincial electoral district) =

Provincial electoral district in Quebec, Canada

Coordinates: 46°30′N 73°10′W

Quebec electoral district

Provincial electoral district
- Legislature: National Assembly of Quebec
MNA
Isabelle Blais
Parti Québécois
- District created: 1867
- First contested: 1867
- Last contested: 2026

Demographics
- Electors (2012): 47,137
- Area (km²): 2,438.7
- Census division(s): Francheville (part), Maskinongé (part)
- Census subdivision(s): Trois-Rivières (part), Charette, Louiseville, Maskinongé, Saint-Alexis-des-Monts, Sainte-Angèle-de-Prémont, Saint-Barnabé, Saint-Édouard-de-Maskinongé, Saint-Élie-de-Caxton, Saint-Étienne-des-Grès, Saint-Justin, Saint-Léon-le-Grand, Saint-Paulin, Saint-Sévère, Sainte-Ursule, Yamachiche

Maskinongé (French pronunciation: [maskinɔ̃ʒe]) is a provincial electoral district in the Mauricie region of Quebec, Canada, which elects members to the National Assembly of Quebec. It notably includes parts of the city of Trois-Rivières, as well as the municipalities of Louiseville, Saint-Boniface, Saint-Étienne-des-Grès and Saint-Alexis-des-Monts.

It was created for the 1867 election, and an electoral district of that name existed even earlier: see Maskinongé (Province of Canada).

In the change from the 2001 to the 2011 electoral map, its border with the Trois-Rivières electoral district was adjusted, resulting in simultaneously gaining and losing different parts of the city of Trois-Rivières.

In the change from the 2011 to the 2017 electoral map, the riding will gain Saint-Boniface and Saint-Mathieu-du-Parc from Saint-Maurice while losing the neighbourhood of Terasse-Duvernay in Trois-Rivières to the riding of Trois-Rivières.

== Members of the Legislative Assembly / National Assembly ==
Legislature	Years	Member	Party
1st	1867–1871	Alexis Lesieur Desaulniers	Conservative
2nd	1871–1875	Moïse Houde	Liberal
3rd	1875–1878	Moïse Houde	Conservative
4th	1878–1881	Édouard Caron	Conservative
5th	1881–1886	Édouard Caron	Conservative
6th	1886–1888	Édouard Caron	Conservative
6th	1888–1890	Joseph-Hormisdas Legris	Parti national
7th	1890–1892	Joseph Lessard	Conservative
8th	1892–1897	Hector Caron	Liberal
9th	1897–1900	Hector Caron	Liberal
10th	1900–1904	Hector Caron	Liberal
10th	1904–1904	Georges Lafontaine	Conservative
11th	1904–1908	Georges Lafontaine	Conservative
12th	1908–1912	Georges Lafontaine	Conservative
13th	1912–1916	Rodolphe Tourville	Liberal
14th	1916–1919	Rodolphe Tourville	Liberal
15th	1919–1923	Rodolphe Tourville	Liberal
16th	1923–1927	Rodolphe Tourville	Liberal
17th	1927–1929†	Joseph-William Gagnon	Liberal
17th	1930–1931	Louis-Joseph Thisdel	Liberal
18th	1931–1935	Louis-Joseph Thisdel	Liberal
19th	1935–1936	Louis-Joseph Thisdel	Liberal
20th	1936–1939	Joseph-Napoléon Caron	Union Nationale
21st	1939–1943†	Louis-Joseph Thisdel	Liberal
22nd	1944–1948	Germain Caron	Union Nationale
23rd	1948–1952	Germain Caron	Union Nationale
24th	1952–1956	Germain Caron	Union Nationale
25th	1956–1960	Germain Caron	Union Nationale
26th	1960–1962	Germain Caron	Union Nationale
27th	1962–1966†	Germain Caron	Union Nationale
28th	1966–1970	Rémi Paul	Union Nationale
29th	1970–1973	Rémi Paul	Union Nationale
30th	1973–1976	Yvon Picotte	Liberal
31st	1976–1981	Yvon Picotte	Liberal
32nd	1981–1985	Yvon Picotte	Liberal
33rd	1985–1989	Yvon Picotte	Liberal
34th	1989–1994	Yvon Picotte	Liberal
35th	1994–1998	Rémy Désilets	Parti Québécois
36th	1998–2003	Rémy Désilets	Parti Québécois
37th	2003–2007	Francine Gaudet	Liberal
38th	2007–2008	Jean Damphousse	Action démocratique
39th	2008–2012	Jean-Paul Diamond	Liberal
40th	2012–2014	Jean-Paul Diamond	Liberal
41st	2014–2018	Marc Plante	Liberal
42nd	2018–2022	Simon Allaire	Coalition Avenir Québec
43rd	2022–2026	Simon Allaire	Coalition Avenir Québec
44th	2026–Present	Isabelle Blais	Parti Québécois

== Election results ==
2026 Quebec general election
** Preliminary results — Not yet official **
Party	Candidate	Votes	%	±%
Parti Québécois	Isabelle Blais	11,099	31.96	
Conservative	Marc-André Cloutier	9,390	27.04	
Coalition Avenir Québec	Simon Allaire	6,830	19.67	
Liberal	Nancy Mignault	4,606	13.26	
Québec solidaire	Simon Poitte	2,365	6.81	
Parti nul	Jérôme Dumont	147	0.42	
Climat Québec	Louise Gosselin	125	0.36	
Independent	Gilles Brodeur	89	0.26	
Démocratie directe	Claude Ladouceur	79	0.23	
Total valid votes				
Total rejected ballots				
Turnout			72.85	
Electors on the lists			–	–
Source: Élections Québec

2022 Quebec general election
Party	Candidate	Votes	%	±%
Coalition Avenir Québec	Simon Allaire	17,096	53.50	+11.08
Conservative	Serge Noël	5,131	16.06	+14.57
Parti Québécois	Dominique Gélinas	4,519	14.14	+1.33
Québec solidaire	Simon Piotte	3,162	9.90	-2.20
Liberal	Alexandra Malenfant-Veilleux	1,619	5.07	-22.83
Green	Daniel Simon	227	0.71	-1.25
L'Union fait la force	Françoise Boisvert	90	0.28	–
Independent	Alain Bélanger	69	0.22	–
Parti 51	Gilles Brodeur	40	0.13	–
Total valid votes		31,953	98.49	
Total rejected ballots		491	1.51	
Turnout		32,444	70.57	
Electors on the lists		45,975		

2018 Quebec general election
Party	Candidate	Votes	%	±%
Coalition Avenir Québec	Simon Allaire	13,199	42.42	+14.13
Liberal	Marc Plante	8,682	27.9	-11.34
Parti Québécois	Nicole Morin	3,987	12.81	-12.3
Québec solidaire	Simon Piotte	3,764	12.1	+6.32
Green	Amélie St-Yves	609	1.96	
Conservative	Maxime Rousseau	463	1.49	
Citoyens au pouvoir	Alain Bélanger	206	0.66	
Independent	Jonathan Beaulieu-Richard	204	0.66	
Total valid votes		31,114	98.25	
Total rejected ballots		553	1.75	
Turnout		31,667	71.58	
Eligible voters		44,239		
Coalition Avenir Québec gain from Liberal		Swing		+12.74
Source(s) "Rapport des résultats officiels du scrutin". Élections Québec.

2014 Quebec general election
Party	Candidate	Votes	%	±%
Liberal	Marc Plante	13,658	39.24	+7.18
Coalition Avenir Québec	Martin Poisson	9,846	28.29	-1.66
Parti Québécois	Patrick Lahaie	8,739	25.11	-4.79
Québec solidaire	Linda Delmé	2,013	5.78	+2.12
Parti nul	Jimmy Thibodeau	238	0.68	
Option nationale	Dany Brien	154	0.44	-1.71
Parti équitable	Laurence J. Requilé	119	0.34	-0.73
Mon pays le Québec	Dany Brien	35	0.10	
Total valid votes		34,802	98.64	
Total rejected ballots		481	1.36	+0.14
Turnout		35,283	73.82	-4.15
Electors on the lists		47,793	–	
Liberal hold		Swing		+4.42

2012 Quebec general election
Party	Candidate	Votes	%	±%
Liberal	Jean-Paul Diamond	11,676	32.06	-10.66
Coalition Avenir Québec	Jean Damphousse	10,907	29.95	+9.88
Parti Québécois	Patrick Lahaie	10,888	29.90	-5.07
Québec solidaire	Julie Veilleux	1,334	3.66	+1.46
Option nationale	Émilie Viau-Drouin	784	2.15	
Green	Laurence J. Requilé	389	1.07	+1.02
Middle class	Linda Delmé	235	0.65	
Coalition pour la constituante	Marie Anny Gosselin	121	0.33	
Équipe Autonomiste	Didier Provencher	81	0.22	
Total valid votes		36,415	98.78	–
Total rejected ballots		450	1.22	–
Turnout		36,865	77.97	
Electors on the lists		47,278	–	–
Liberal hold		Swing		-10.27

^ Change is from redistributed results. CAQ change is from ADQ.

2008 Quebec general election
Party	Candidate	Votes	%	±%
Liberal	Jean-Paul Diamond	13,429	42.25	+13.24
Parti Québécois	Rémy Désilets	10,988	34.57	+7.63
Action démocratique	Jean Damphousse	6,259	19.69	-20.35
Québec solidaire	Mariannick Mercure	708	2.23	+0.35
Independent	Michel Thibeault	397	1.25	

2007 Quebec general election
Party	Candidate	Votes	%	±%
Action démocratique	Jean Damphousse	14,862	40.04	
Liberal	Francine Gaudet	10,767	29.01	
Parti Québécois	Rémy Désilets	10,008	26.96	
Green	Frédéric Demouy	781	2.10	–
Québec solidaire	Mario Landry	699	1.88	

2003 Quebec general election
Party	Candidate	Votes	%
Liberal	Francine Gaudet	13,240	38.16
Parti Québécois	Rémy Désilets	12,334	35.55
Action démocratique	Louise-Andrée Garant	9,118	26.28
Total valid votes		34,692	98.41
Total rejected ballots		560	1.59
Turnout		35,252	74.62
Electors on the lists		47,243	–

1998 Quebec general election
Party	Candidate	Votes	%
Parti Québécois	Rémy Désilets	17,423	48.15
Liberal	Marc Renaud	13,230	36.56
Action démocratique	André Labonté	5,225	14.44
Natural Law	Norbert Germain	308	0.85
Total valid votes		36,186	98.72
Total rejected ballots		470	1.28
Turnout		36,656	80.62
Electors on the lists		45,470	–

1995 Quebec referendum
Side	Votes	%
Oui	22,502	57.07
Non	16,925	42.93

1994 Quebec general election
Party	Candidate	Votes	%
Parti Québécois	Rémy Désilets	16,047	47.56
Liberal	Jean-Paul Diamond	13,128	38.91
Action démocratique	André Ménard	4,261	12.63
Natural Law	Marc Lacroix	307	0.91
Total valid votes		33,743	98.09
Total rejected ballots		656	1.91
Turnout		34,399	81.72
Electors on the lists		42,095	–

1992 Charlottetown Accord referendum
Side	Votes	%
Non	20,716	63.69
Oui	11,812	36.31

1989 Quebec general election
Party	Candidate	Votes	%
Liberal	Yvon Picotte	18,191	63.63
Parti Québécois	Luc Lambert	10,396	36.37
Total valid votes		28,587	96.76
Total rejected ballots		958	3.24
Turnout		29,545	76.61
Electors on the lists		38,565	–

1985 Quebec general election
Party	Candidate	Votes	%
Liberal	Yvon Picotte	17,599	61.51
Parti Québécois	Paul-Emile Gélinas	9,844	34.41
Progressive Conservative	Pierre Arès	1,167	4.08
Total valid votes		28,610	98.57
Total rejected ballots		415	1.43
Turnout		29,025	80.63
Electors on the lists		35,997	–

1981 Quebec general election
Party	Candidate	Votes	%
Liberal	Yvon Picotte	13,248	46.89
Parti Québécois	Paul-Emile Gélinas	13,015	46.06
Union Nationale	Liliane Lessard	1,993	7.05
Total valid votes		28,256	98.96
Total rejected ballots		297	1.04
Turnout		28,553	85.27
Electors on the lists		33,484	–

1980 Quebec referendum
Side	Votes	%
Non	17,759	63.38
Oui	10,260	36.62

1976 Quebec general election
Party	Candidate	Votes	%
Liberal	Yvon Picotte	9,124	35.84
Parti Québécois	Jacques Charette	8,721	34.25
Union Nationale	Serge Gagnon	6,561	25.77
Ralliement créditiste	J.-Rodolphe Lemieux	1,055	4.14
Total valid votes		25,461	98.48
Total rejected ballots		394	1.52
Turnout		25,855	88.24
Electors on the lists		29,302	–

1973 Quebec general election
Party	Candidate	Votes	%
Liberal	Yvon Picotte	10,610	48.81
Union Nationale	Rémi Paul	5,334	24.54
Parti Québécois	Hector Rivard	3,594	16.54
Ralliement créditiste	J.-Rodolphe Lemieux	2,198	10.11
Total valid votes		21,736	98.69
Total rejected ballots		288	1.31
Turnout		22,024	83.82
Electors on the lists		26,274	–

1970 Quebec general election
Party	Candidate	Votes	%
Union Nationale	Rémi Paul	5,113	43.06
Liberal	Yvon Picotte	3,814	32.12
Ralliement créditiste	René-Paul Gaboury	2,190	18.44
Parti Québécois	Marcel Rocheleau	757	6.38
Total valid votes		11,874	98.25
Total rejected ballots		211	1.75
Turnout		12,085	90.46
Electors on the lists		13,360	–

1966 Quebec general election
Party	Candidate	Votes	%
Union Nationale	Rémi Paul	6,115	52.94
Liberal	Joseph-André-Avellin Dalcourt	5,262	45.55
Ralliement national	Jean-Marie Deschênes	174	1.51
Total valid votes		11,551	98.85
Total rejected ballots		134	1.15
Turnout		11,685	90.50
Electors on the lists		12,912	–

1962 Quebec general election
Party	Candidate	Votes	%
Union Nationale	Germain Caron	5,312	53.71
Liberal	Jean-Marie Thisdel	4,578	46.29
Total valid votes		9,890	99.29
Total rejected ballots		71	0.71
Turnout		9,961	91.18
Electors on the lists		10,925	–

1960 Quebec general election
Party	Candidate	Votes	%
Union Nationale	Germain Caron	5,481	54.29
Liberal	Edmond-René-L. Béland	4,614	45.71
Total valid votes		10,095	99.08
Total rejected ballots		94	0.92
Turnout		10,189	92.95
Electors on the lists		10,962	–

1956 Quebec general election
Party	Candidate	Votes	%
Union Nationale	Germain Caron	5,588	57.26
Liberal	Edmond-René-L. Béland	4,171	42.74
Total valid votes		9,759	98.80
Total rejected ballots		119	1.20
Turnout		9,878	93.04
Electors on the lists		10,617	–

1952 Quebec general election
Party	Candidate	Votes	%
Union Nationale	Germain Caron	5,074	53.82
Liberal	Joseph-André-Avellin Dalcourt	4,353	46.18
Total valid votes		9,427	99.08
Total rejected ballots		88	0.92
Turnout		9,515	92.72
Electors on the lists		10,262	–

1948 Quebec general election
Party	Candidate	Votes	%
Union Nationale	Germain Caron	5,184	55.68
Liberal	Joseph-André-Avellin Dalcourt	4,060	43.60
Union des électeurs	Lionel-Guérin Lajoie	67	0.72
Total valid votes		9,311	99.18
Total rejected ballots		77	0.82
Turnout		9,388	91.60
Electors on the lists		10,249	–

1944 Quebec general election
Party	Candidate	Votes	%
Union Nationale	Germain Caron	4,475	54.98
Liberal	Omer Gagnon	3,135	38.51
Bloc populaire	Joseph-Anasthase Comtois	530	6.51
Total valid votes		8,140	98.98
Total rejected ballots		84	1.02
Turnout		8,224	85.85
Electors on the lists		9,579	–

1939 Quebec general election
Party	Candidate	Votes	%
Liberal	Jean-Marie Thisdel	2,155	57.76
Union Nationale	L.-Armand Lamy	1,576	42.24
Total valid votes		3,731	99.23
Total rejected ballots		29	0.77
Turnout		3,760	80.76
Electors on the lists		4,656	–

1936 Quebec general election
Party	Candidate	Votes	%
Union Nationale	Joseph-Napoléon Caron	2,269	55.38
Liberal	Louis-Joseph Thisdel	1,828	44.62
Total valid votes		4,097	99.49
Total rejected ballots		21	0.51
Turnout		4,118	87.04
Electors on the lists		4,731	–

1935 Quebec general election
Party	Candidate	Votes	%
Liberal	Louis-Joseph Thisdel	2,319	64.20
Action libérale nationale	Joseph-Maxime Bourassa	1,293	35.80
Total valid votes		3,612	99.53
Total rejected ballots		17	0.47
Turnout		3,629	78.04
Electors on the lists		4,650	–

1931 Quebec general election
Party	Candidate	Votes	%
Liberal	Louis-Joseph Thisdel	1,912	61.24
Conservative	Joseph-Maxime Bourassa	1,210	38.76
Total valid votes		3,122	99.33
Total rejected ballots		21	0.67
Turnout		3,143	81.47
Electors on the lists		3,858	–

1927 Quebec general election
Party	Candidate	Votes	%
Liberal	Joseph-William Gagnon	1,612	60.04
Conservative	Adélard Bellemare	1,073	39.96
Total valid votes		2,685	99.44
Total rejected ballots		15	0.56
Turnout		2,700	67.91
Electors on the lists		3,976	–

1923 Quebec general election
Party	Candidate	Votes	%
Liberal	Rodolphe Tourville	1,589	55.27
Conservative	L.-Armand Lamy	1,286	44.73
Total valid votes		2,875	98.59
Total rejected ballots		41	1.41
Turnout		2,916	77.53
Electors on the lists		3,761	–

1919 Quebec general election
Party	Candidate	Votes	%
Liberal	Rodolphe Tourville	1,419	67.16
Conservative	L.-Armand Lamy	694	32.84
Total valid votes		2,113	98.83
Total rejected ballots		25	1.17
Turnout		2,138	57.85
Electors on the lists		3,696	–

1916 Quebec general election
Party	Candidate	Votes	%
Liberal	Rodolphe Tourville	1,678	56.23
Conservative	Arthur Baril	1,306	43.77
Total valid votes		2,984	98.58
Total rejected ballots		43	1.42
Turnout		3,027	76.21
Electors on the lists		3,734	–

1912 Quebec general election
Party	Candidate	Votes	%
Liberal	Rodolphe Tourville	1,439	51.56
Conservative	Georges Lafontaine	1,352	48.44
Total valid votes		2,791	98.76
Total rejected ballots		35	1.24
Turnout		2,826	76.21
Electors on the lists		3,708	–

1908 Quebec general election
Party	Candidate	Votes	%
Conservative	Georges Lafontaine	1,285	51.77
Liberal	Pierre Gélinas	1,197	48.23
Total valid votes		2,482	98.73
Total rejected ballots		32	1.27
Turnout		2,514	71.34
Electors on the lists		3,524	–

1904 Quebec general election
Party	Candidate	Votes	%
Conservative	Georges Lafontaine	1,417	54.88
Liberal	Antonin Galipeault	1,165	45.12
Total valid votes		2,582	98.85
Total rejected ballots		30	1.15
Turnout		2,612	69.99
Electors on the lists		3,732	–

Quebec provincial by-election, 1904
Party	Candidate	Votes	%
Conservative	Georges Lafontaine	1,228	51.55
Liberal	Jérémie L. Desaulniers	1,154	48.45
Total valid votes		2,382	98.39
Total rejected ballots		39	1.61
Turnout		2,421	67.78
Electors on the lists		3,572	–

1900 Quebec general election
Party	Candidate	Votes	
Liberal	Hector Caron	Acclaimed	
Electors on the lists		3,403	–

1897 Quebec general election
Party	Candidate	Votes	%
Liberal	Hector Caron	1,422	59.72
Conservative	J.-R.-Édouard Désy	959	40.28
Total valid votes		2,381	99.37
Total rejected ballots		15	0.63
Turnout		2,396	69.53
Electors on the lists		3,446	–

1892 Quebec general election
Party	Candidate	Votes	%
Liberal	Hector Caron	1,142	50.55
Conservative	Joseph Lessard	1,117	49.45
Total valid votes		2,259	99.25
Total rejected ballots		17	0.75
Turnout		2,276	72.30
Electors on the lists		3,148	–

1890 Quebec general election
Party	Candidate	Votes	%
Conservative	Joseph Lessard	1,115	50.94
Parti national	Joseph-Hormisdas Legris	1,074	49.06
Total valid votes		2,189	99.32
Total rejected ballots		15	0.68
Turnout		2,204	69.59
Electors on the lists		3,167	–

Quebec provincial by-election, 1888
Party	Candidate	Votes	%
Parti national	Joseph-Hormisdas Legris	1,066	51.40
Conservative	Édouard Caron	1,008	48.60
Total valid votes		2,074	98.30
Total rejected ballots		26	1.70
Turnout		2,100	75.24
Electors on the lists		2,791	–

1886 Quebec general election
Party	Candidate	Votes	%
Conservative	Édouard Caron	905	49.00
Parti national	Joseph-Hormisdas Legris	840	45.48
Conservative	Alfred-Baron Lafrenière	102	5.52
Total valid votes		1,847	98.30
Total rejected ballots		32	1.70
Turnout		1,879	73.23
Electors on the lists		2,566	–

1881 Quebec general election
Party	Candidate	Votes	%
Conservative	Édouard Caron	1,035	71.53
Independent	Isaïe Marchand	412	28.47
Total valid votes		1,447	97.24
Total rejected ballots		41	2.76
Turnout		1,488	62.76
Electors on the lists		2,731	–

1878 Quebec general election
Party	Candidate	Votes	%
Conservative	Édouard Caron	720	50.56
Conservative	Alfred-Baron Lafrenière	456	32.02
Conservative	Moïse Houde	248	17.42
Total valid votes		1,424	97.14
Total rejected ballots		42	2.86
Turnout		1,466	64.35
Electors on the lists		2,278	–

1875 Quebec general election
Party	Candidate	Votes	%
Conservative	Moïse Houde	781	59.35
Conservative	Alexis Lesieur Desaulniers	535	40.65
Total valid votes		1,316	99.55
Total rejected ballots		6	0.45
Turnout		1,322	64.61
Electors on the lists		2,046	–

1871 Quebec general election
Party	Candidate	Votes	%
Liberal	Moïse Houde	809	55.91
Conservative	Alexis Lesieur Desaulniers	638	44.09
Total valid votes		1,447	100.00
Turnout		1,447	71.49
Electors on the lists		2,024	–

1867 Quebec general election
Party	Candidate	Votes	%
Conservative	Alexis Lesieur Desaulniers	674	54.14
Conservative	Édouard Caron	566	45.46
Liberal	Moïse Houde	3	0.24
Conservative	Dieudonné Maigret	2	0.16
Total valid votes		1,245	100.00
Turnout		1,245	74.42
Electors on the lists		1,673	–

== See also ==
- List of Quebec provincial electoral districts
- Canadian provincial electoral districts
