= Édouard Caron =

Canadian politician

Édouard Caron was a politician in the Quebec, Canada, who served as Member of the Legislative Assembly.

== Early life ==
He was born on April 22, 1830, in Louiseville, Mauricie.

== City Politics ==
He served as Mayor of Louiseville (then known as Rivière-du-Loup) in 1874.

== Provincial Politics ==
Caron, ran as a Conservative candidate in the district of Maskinongé in 1867, but was defeated.

He won a seat to the Legislative Assembly of Quebec in 1878 in the same district and was re-elected in 1881 and 1886.

His last re-election though was declared void in 1887. A by-election was called to settle the matter in 1888, which Caron lost against candidate Joseph-Hormisdas Legris of Honoré Mercier's Parti National.

== Death ==
He died on February 25, 1900.

== Footnotes ==
National Assembly of Quebec
Preceded by Moïse Houde, Conservative	MLA, District of Maskinongé; 1878–1887	Succeeded by Joseph-Hormisdas Legris, Parti National
