= Germain Caron =

Canadian politician

Member of the Legislative Assembly of Quebec for Maskinongé
- In office 1944–1966
- Preceded by: Louis-Joseph Thisdel
- Succeeded by: Rémi Paul

Personal details
- Born: March 12, 1910 Saint-Antoine-de-la-Rivière-du-Loup (now Louiseville), Quebec
- Died: February 14, 1966 (aged 55) Montreal, Quebec
- Party: Union Nationale

Germain Caron (March 12, 1910 – February 14, 1966) was a politician in Quebec, Canada and a six-term Member of the Legislative Assembly of Quebec (MLA).

== Early life ==
He was born on March 12, 1910, in Louiseville, Mauricie and was an attorney.

== Mayor of Louiseville ==
Caron served as Mayor of Louiseville from 1953 to 1961.

== Member of the legislature ==
He ran as a Union Nationale candidate in the district of Maskinongé in the 1944 provincial election and won. He was re-elected in 1948 and won every subsequent election in 1952, 1956, 1960 and 1962.

He served as House Deputy Speaker from 1958 to 1960 and House Whip from 1959 until 1960.

== Death ==
He died in office on February 14, 1966, in Montreal.

== See also ==
- Maskinongé Provincial Electoral District
- Louiseville
- Mauricie
