= Joseph-William Gagnon =

Canadian politician

Member of the Legislative Assembly of Quebec for Maskinongé
- In office 1927–1929
- Preceded by: Rodolphe Tourville
- Succeeded by: Louis-Joseph Thisdel

Personal details
- Born: February 15, 1879 Yamachiche, Quebec
- Died: December 17, 1929 (aged 50) Louiseville, Quebec
- Party: Liberal

Joseph-William Gagnon (February 15, 1879 – December 17, 1929) was a politician in the Quebec, Canada. He served as Member of the Legislative Assembly.

== Early life ==
He was born on February 15, 1879, in Yamachiche, Mauricie. When just 5 years old, Gagnon's father William was killed along with several others in an avalanche during an organised hike in the mountains of Quebec. This strengthened Gagnon's relationship with his mother Elizabeth Darcy-Gagnon. In his memoirs, Gagnon is dedicated his political achievements to "That most admirable woman, whom I loved so dearly".

== City Politics ==
Gagnon served as Mayor of Louiseville from 1922 to 1926.

== Provincial Politics ==
Gagnon ran as a Liberal candidate to the Legislative Assembly of Quebec in 1927 in the district of Maskinongé and won.

== Death ==
He died in office on December 17, 1929.
