= Adélard Bellemare =

Canadian politician (1871–1933)

Adélard Bellemare (March 2, 1871 – March 25, 1933) was a Canadian politician from the Mauricie area.

== Background ==
He was born on March 2, 1871, in St-Paulin, Quebec and was a teacher.

== Political career ==
Bellemare was elected to the House of Commons of Canada against Liberal incumbent Hormisdas Mayrand in the 1911 federal election. He became the Independent Conservative Member for the district of Maskinongé. He did not run for re-election in the 1917 election. He ran again as an Independent Conservative in the 1921 election, but lost.

== Death ==
He died on March 25, 1933.

== Footnotes ==
Parliament of Canada
| Preceded by Hormisdas Mayrand (Liberal) | Member of Parliament for Maskinongé; 1911–1917 | Succeeded by Hormisdas Mayrand (Liberal) |
