= Joseph-Hormisdas Legris =

Canadian politician (1850–1932)

The Hon. Joseph-Hormisdas Legris
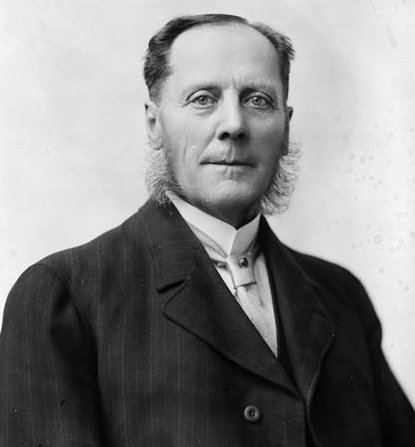

Member of the Legislative Assembly of Quebec for Maskinongé
- In office 1888–1890
- Preceded by: Édouard Caron
- Succeeded by: Joseph Lessard

Member of the Canadian Parliament for Maskinongé
- In office 1891–1903
- Preceded by: Charles-Jérémie Coulombe
- Succeeded by: Hormidas Mayrand

Senator for Repentigny, Quebec
- In office 1903–1932
- Appointed by: Wilfrid Laurier
- Preceded by: Joseph-François Armand
- Succeeded by: Joseph Hormisdas Rainville

Personal details
- Born: May 6, 1850 Rivière-du-Loup-en-Haut (Louiseville), Canada East
- Died: March 6, 1932 (aged 81) Ottawa, Ontario, Canada
- Party: Liberal

Joseph-Hormisdas Legris (May 6, 1850 – March 6, 1932) was a politician in Quebec, Canada. He served as Member of the Legislative Assembly (MLA), Member of Parliament (MP) and Senator.

== Early life ==
He was born on May 6, 1850, in Louiseville, Mauricie. He was a farmer and an army officer of the local army reserve.

== Provincial politics ==
Legris ran as a candidate of Honoré Mercier's Parti National in 1886 and lost. However, the election was eventually declared void and a by-election was called to settle the matter. Legris ended up winning the 1888 by-election and became MLA for the provincial district of Maskinongé.

In 1890 though, his own election was cancelled. The same year, Catholic Bishop Louis-François Richer Laflèche used his influence to help local candidates of the Conservative Party being elected. Legris lost re-election against Joseph Lessard.

== Federal politics ==
In 1891, Legris was elected as a Liberal candidate to the House of Commons, representing the district of Maskinongé. He was re-elected in 1896 and 1900.

He resigned in 1903 to accept an appointment to the Canadian Senate.

== City politics ==
He served as Mayor of Louiseville from 1921 to 1922.

== Death ==
He died in office on March 6, 1932, in Ottawa, Ontario.
