= Simon Allaire =

Canadian politician

Member of the National Assembly of Quebec for Maskinongé
- In office October 1, 2018 – October 5, 2026
- Preceded by: Marc Plante
- Succeeded by: Isabelle Blais

Personal details
- Born: 1977 (age 48–49) Sorel-Tracy, Quebec
- Party: Coalition Avenir Québec

Simon Allaire is a Canadian politician, who was elected to the National Assembly of Quebec in the 2018 provincial election. He represented the electoral district of Maskinongé as a member of the Coalition Avenir Québec until 2026.

== Electoral record ==
2026 Quebec general election: Maskinongé
** Preliminary results — Not yet official **
Party	Candidate	Votes	%	±%
Parti Québécois	Isabelle Blais	11,099	31.96	
Conservative	Marc-André Cloutier	9,390	27.04	
Coalition Avenir Québec	Simon Allaire	6,830	19.67	
Liberal	Nancy Mignault	4,606	13.26	
Québec solidaire	Simon Poitte	2,365	6.81	
Parti nul	Jérôme Dumont	147	0.42	
Climat Québec	Louise Gosselin	125	0.36	
Independent	Gilles Brodeur	89	0.26	
Démocratie directe	Claude Ladouceur	79	0.23	
Total valid votes				
Total rejected ballots				
Turnout			72.85	
Electors on the lists			–	–
Source: Élections Québec

2022 Quebec general election: Maskinongé
Party	Candidate	Votes	%	±%
Coalition Avenir Québec	Simon Allaire	17,096	53.50	+11.08
Conservative	Serge Noël	5,131	16.06	+14.57
Parti Québécois	Dominique Gélinas	4,519	14.14	+1.33
Québec solidaire	Simon Piotte	3,162	9.90	-2.20
Liberal	Alexandra Malenfant-Veilleux	1,619	5.07	-22.83
Green	Daniel Simon	227	0.71	-1.25
L'Union fait la force	Françoise Boisvert	90	0.28	–
Independent	Alain Bélanger	69	0.22	–
Parti 51	Gilles Brodeur	40	0.13	–
Total valid votes		31,953	98.49	
Total rejected ballots		491	1.51	
Turnout		32,444	70.57	
Electors on the lists		45,975		

2018 Quebec general election: Maskinongé
Party	Candidate	Votes	%	±%
Coalition Avenir Québec	Simon Allaire	13,199	42.42	+14.13
Liberal	Marc Plante	8,682	27.9	-11.34
Parti Québécois	Nicole Morin	3,987	12.81	-12.3
Québec solidaire	Simon Piotte	3,764	12.1	+6.32
Green	Amélie St-Yves	609	1.96	
Conservative	Maxime Rousseau	463	1.49	
Citoyens au pouvoir	Alain Bélanger	206	0.66	
Independent	Jonathan Beaulieu-Richard	204	0.66	
Total valid votes		31,114	98.25	
Total rejected ballots		553	1.75	
Turnout		31,667	71.58	
Eligible voters		44,239		
Coalition Avenir Québec gain from Liberal		Swing		+12.74
Source(s) "Rapport des résultats officiels du scrutin". Élections Québec.
