= Joseph-Napoléon Caron =

Canadian politician

Member of the Legislative Assembly of Quebec for Maskinongé
- In office 1936–1939
- Preceded by: Louis-Joseph Thisdel
- Succeeded by: Louis-Joseph Thisdel

Personal details
- Born: November 7, 1896 Louiseville, Quebec
- Died: October 17, 1970 (aged 73) Trois-Rivières, Quebec
- Party: Union Nationale

Joseph-Napoléon Caron (November 7, 1896 – October 17, 1970) was a politician Quebec, Canada and a one-term Member of the Legislative Assembly of Quebec (MLA).

== Early life ==
He was born on November 7, 1896, in Louiseville, Mauricie and was a hardware store owner.

== City Politics ==
Caron served as a Councilmember in Louiseville in 1925.

== Member of the legislature ==
He ran as a Union Nationale candidate in the district of Maskinongé in the 1936 provincial election and defeated Liberal incumbent Louis-Joseph Thisdel. He did not run for re-election in 1939.

== Death ==
He died on October 17, 1970, in Trois-Rivières.

== See also ==
- Maskinongé Provincial Electoral District
- Louiseville
- Mauricie
