= Louis-Joseph Thisdel =

Canadian politician

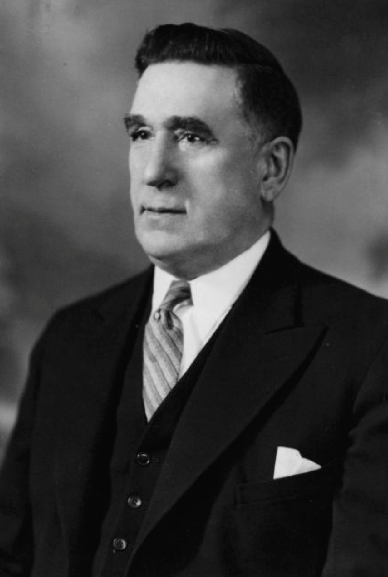

Member of the Legislative Assembly of Quebec for Maskinongé
- In office 1930–1936
- Preceded by: Joseph-William Gagnon
- Succeeded by: Joseph-Napoléon Caron
- In office 1939–1944
- Preceded by: Joseph-Napoléon Caron
- Succeeded by: Germain Caron

Personal details
- Born: May 16, 1886 Louiseville, Quebec
- Died: February 9, 1943 (aged 56) Louiseville, Quebec
- Party: Liberal

Louis-Joseph Thisdel (May 16, 1886 – February 9, 1943) was a politician in the Quebec, Canada. He served as Member of the Legislative Assembly.

== Early life ==
He was born on May 16, 1886, in Louiseville, Mauricie.

== City politics ==
He was on the city council in Louiseville from 1918 to 1922 and mayor of that town from 1923 to 1930.

== Provincial politics ==
Thisdel won a by-election in 1930 and became the Liberal Member of the legislature, representing the provincial district of Maskinongé. He was re-elected in 1931 and 1935.

In 1936 he was defeated by Union Nationale candidate Joseph-Napoléon Caron. In 1939 though, he ran again and won his seat back.

He served as Minister without Portfolio in Premier Adélard Godbout's Cabinet.

== Death ==
He died in office on February 9, 1943, in Louiseville. He was succeeded by Germain Caron who was elected in 1944.
