= Arthur Boyer =

Canadian politician (1851–1922)

The Honourable Arthur Boyer
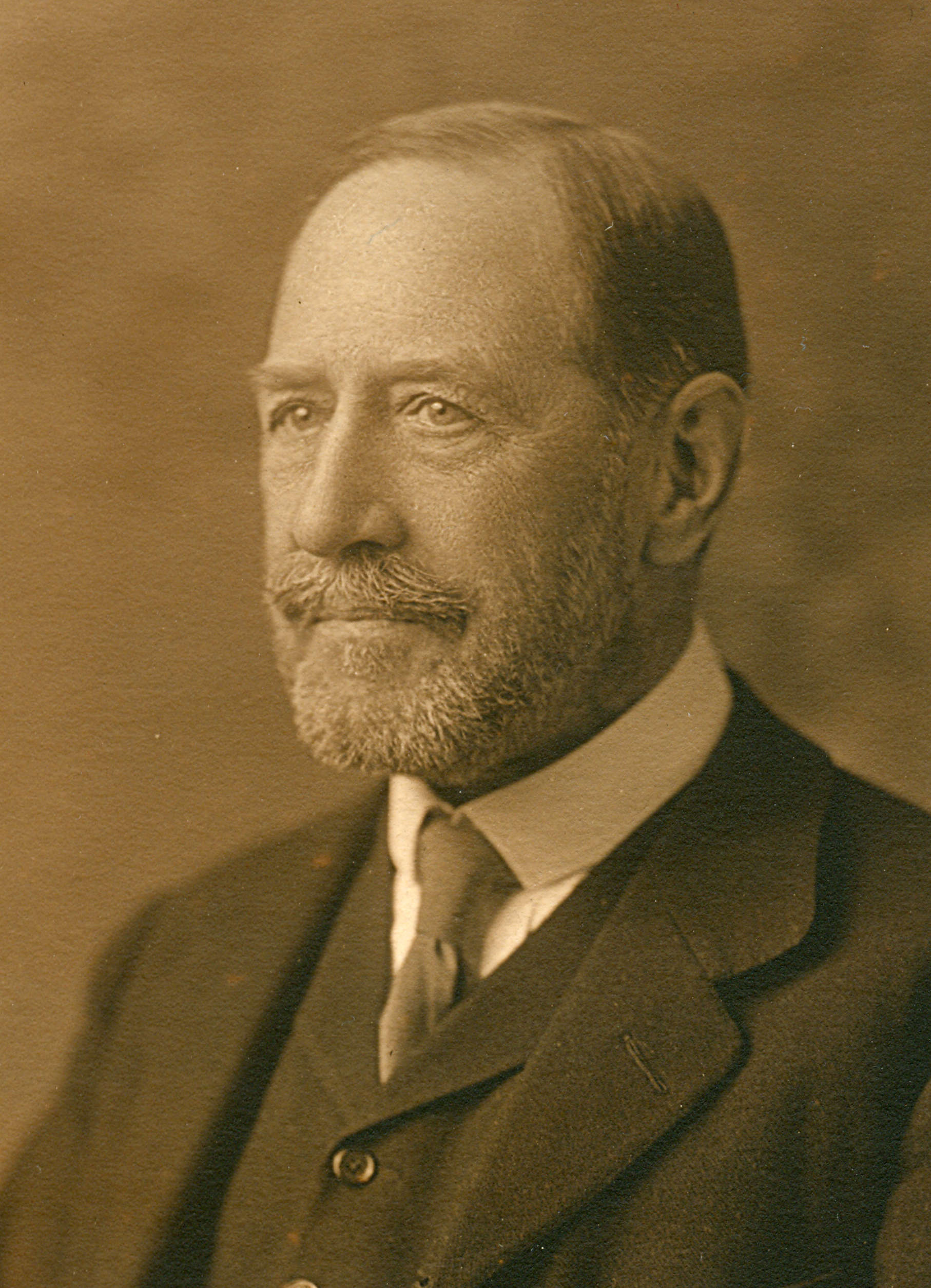

Senator for Rigaud, Quebec
- In office 1909–1922
- Appointed by: Wilfrid Laurier
- Preceded by: Joseph-Rosaire Thibaudeau
- Succeeded by: Gustave Benjamin Boyer

Member of Legislative Assembly of Quebec for Jacques-Cartier
- In office 1884–1892
- Preceded by: Joseph-Alfred Mousseau
- Succeeded by: Joseph Adélard Descarries

Personal details
- Born: 9 February 1851 Montreal, Canada East
- Died: 24 January 1922 (aged 70) Montreal, Quebec
- Party: Liberal
- Other political affiliations: Quebec Liberal Party
- Relations: Louis Boyer, father Louis-Alphonse Boyer, brother Arthur Mignault, son-in-law
- Cabinet: Provincial: Minister Without Portfolio

Arthur Boyer (9 February 1851 – 24 January 1922) was a Canadian politician in the province of Quebec.

Born in Montreal, Canada East, the son of Louis Boyer and Marie-Aurélie Mignault, Boyer studied in Montreal and at the University of London. He was elected to the Legislative Assembly of Quebec for the electoral district of Jacques-Cartier in an 1884 by-election. A Quebec Liberal, he was re-elected in the 1886 election and the 1890 election. In 1890, he was made a Minister Without Portfolio in the cabinet of Honoré Mercier. He was defeated in the 1892 election. He was the defeated Liberal candidate for the House of Commons of Canada in the 1896 election for the electoral district of Jacques Cartier.

He was called to the Senate of Canada on the advice of Prime Minister Wilfrid Laurier in 1909 for the senatorial division of Rigaud. He served until his death in 1922. He was buried in the Notre Dame des Neiges Cemetery. His brother, Louis-Alphonse Boyer, was also a politician.

He had two daughters with Ernestine Galarneau, one of which would marry Canadian Army Medical Corps colonel Arthur Mignault, the founder of the Royal 22^{e} Régiment of the Canadian army.

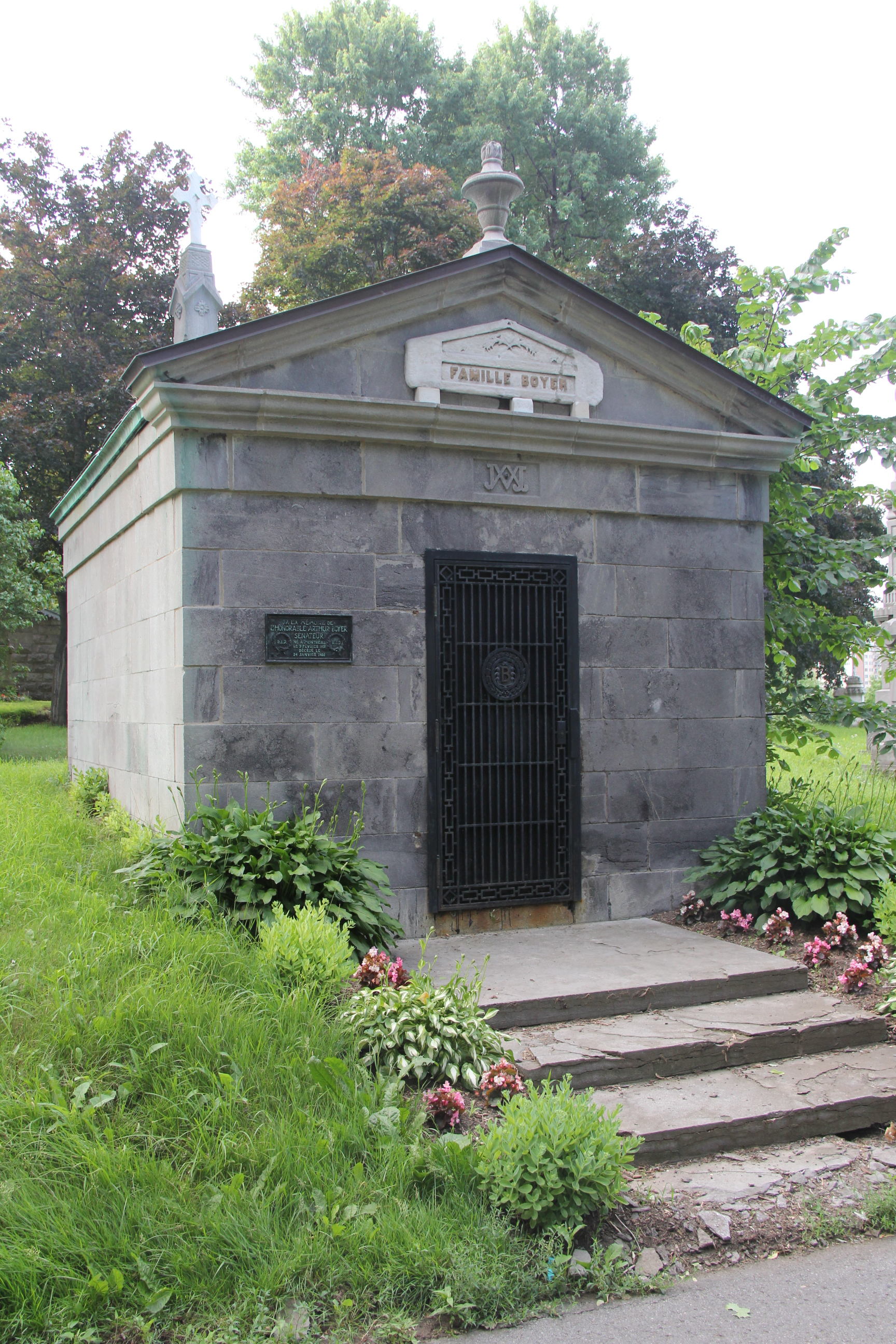
Tomb of Arthur Boyer in Notre Dame des Neiges Cemetery

== See also ==
- Politics of Quebec
