= Joseph Lessard =

Canadian politician

Joseph Lessard (April 8, 1847 – March 27, 1914) was a politician in Quebec, Canada. He served as Member of the Legislative Assembly.

== Early life ==
He was born on April 8, 1847, in Saint-Léon, Mauricie.

== Political career ==
Lessard won a seat to the Legislative Assembly of Quebec as a Conservative candidate in 1890 in the district of Maskinongé with the support of local Catholic Bishop Louis-François Richer Laflèche. He succeeded Joseph-Hormisdas Legris of Honoré Mercier’s Parti National.

In 1892 he lost re-election against Liberal candidate Hector Caron.

== Death ==
He died on March 27, 1914.

== Footnotes ==
National Assembly of Quebec
Preceded by Joseph-Hormisdas Legris, Parti National	MLA, District of Maskinongé; 1890–1892	Succeeded by Hector Caron, Liberal
