= Caïman Fu =

Canadian pop rock band

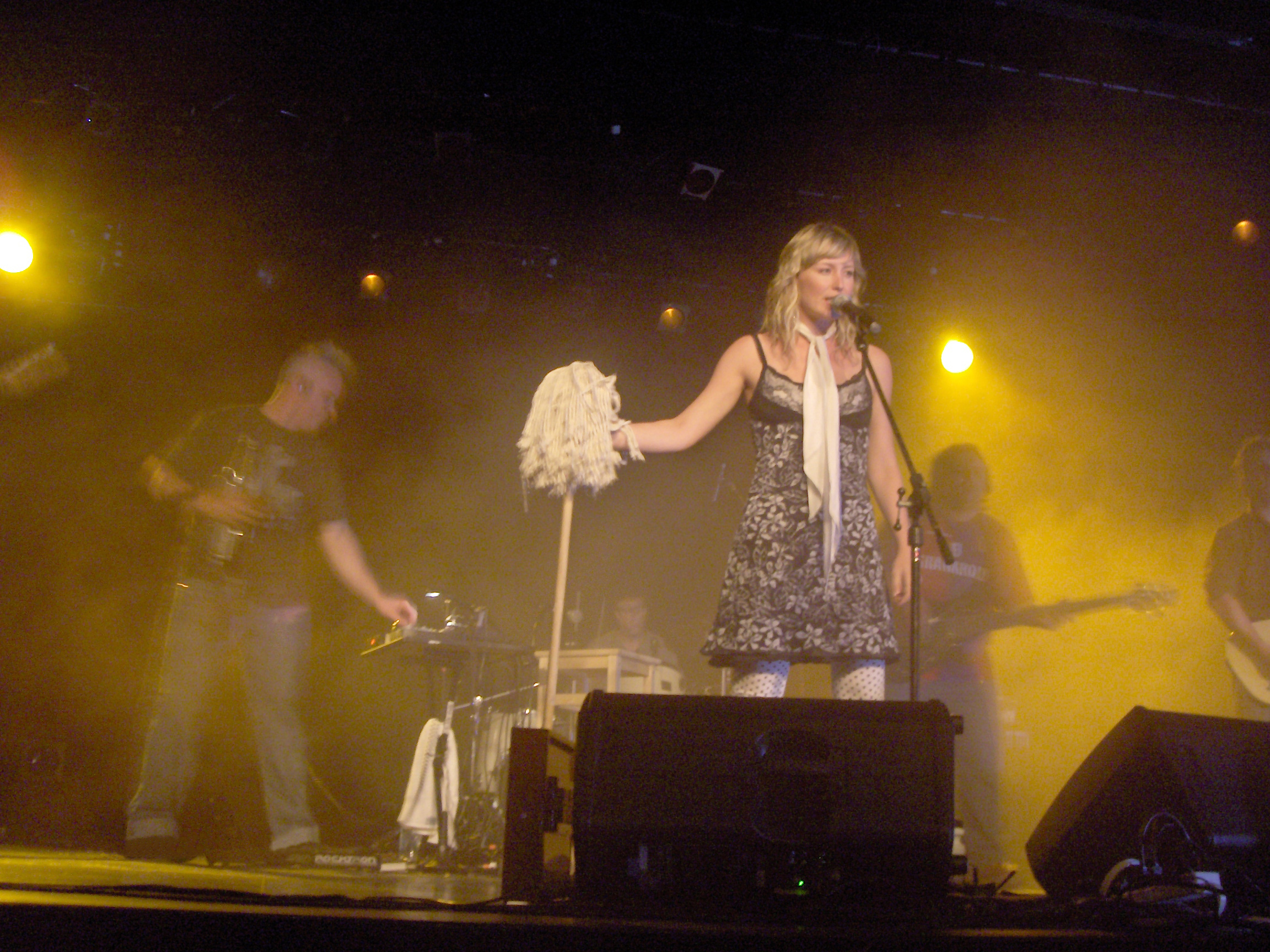
- Trois-Pistoles French Immersion School, July 2006.

Background information
- Origin: Quebec, Canada
- Genres: Jazz, Pop, Rock
- Years active: 2000 – Present
- Labels: Voxtone
- Members: Isabelle Blais (vocalist, songwriter); Nicolas Grimard (guitar); Yves Manseau (guitar); Igor Bartula (bass); Mathieu Massicotte (drums)

Caïman Fu are a Québécois pop rock band founded in 2000 by Nicolas Grimard and Yves Manseau. They released their self-titled debut album in 2003, which was subsequently followed by Les Charmes du Quotidien ("The Charms of the Everyday") in the fall of 2005 and Drôle d'animal in 2008.

In 2005, they were spokespersons for the first Salon of Independent Music of Quebec. They played at Francofolies in 2002 and 2003.

== Discography ==
- 2003 : Caïman Fu
- 2006 : Les charmes du quotidien
- 2008 : Drôle d'animal
- 2012 : À des milles

== Band members ==
=== Line-up ===
2000–2005	Isabelle Blais - vocals; Igor Bartula - bass; Pascal Gingras - drums; Nicholas Grimard - guitar; Yves Manseau - guitar
2006–2007	Isabelle Blais - vocals and percussion; Igor Bartula - bass; Alain Bergé - drums (unofficial member); Nicholas Grimard - guitar and lap steel; Yves Manseau - guitar
2008–present	Isabelle Blais - vocals; Igor Bartula - bass; Mathieu Massicotte - drums; Nicholas Grimard - guitar; Yves Manseau - guitar

== Anecdotes ==
- The name of their group is often stylized with an "ï" that includes two dots placed vertically and not horizontally.
