= Hormidas Mayrand =

Canadian politician

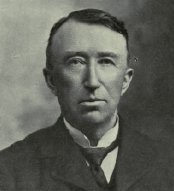

Member of the Canadian Parliament for Maskinongé
- In office 1903–1911
- Preceded by: Joseph-Hormisdas Legris
- Succeeded by: Adélard Bellemare
- In office 1917–1921
- Preceded by: Adélard Bellemare
- Succeeded by: Eugène Desrochers

Personal details
- Born: August 15, 1858 St-Léon, Canada East
- Died: July 4, 1928 (aged 69)
- Party: Liberal

Hormidas Mayrand (August 15, 1858 – July 4, 1928) was a Canadian politician.

Born in St-Léon, Canada East, the son of Jean-Baptiste Mayrand (and grandson of Étienne Mayrand) and Marie Louise Lottinville, Mayrand was educated at the model school of St-Léon. A farmer by occupation, he was first elected to the House of Commons of Canada for the Quebec electoral district of Maskinongé in a 1903 by-election, after the sitting MP, Joseph-Hormisdas Legris, was called to the Senate of Canada. A Liberal, he was re-elected in the 1904 and 1908 elections. He was defeated in 1911 but was re-elected in 1917. He did not run in 1921 election. He was also mayor of St-Léon.
