= Francine Gaudet =

Canadian politician (born 1948)

Member of the National Assembly
- In office 2003–2007
- Preceded by: Rémy Désilets
- Succeeded by: Jean Damphousse
- Constituency: Maskinongé

Personal details
- Born: May 30, 1948 (age 77) Sainte-Gertrude, Quebec, Canada
- Party: Quebec Liberal Party
- Occupation: educator

Francine Gaudet (born May 30, 1948) is a former Canadian politician in the province of Quebec. She was a Quebec Liberal Party Member of the National Assembly of Quebec from 2003 to 2007, and the federal Liberal Party candidate for Berthier—Maskinongé in the 2011 federal election.

== Background ==
Gaudet was born on May 30, 1948, in Sainte-Gertrude, Centre-du-Québec and is an educator.

== Political career ==
Gaudet ran as a Liberal candidate in the provincial district of Maskinongé in the 2003 provincial election and won, defeating PQ incumbent Rémy Désilets.

She served as Parliamentary Assistant from 2003 to 2007. In the 2007 election, she lost re-election against ADQ candidate Jean Damphousse.

In the 2011 federal election, Gaudet ran as the Liberal Party candidate for Berthier—Maskinongé and placed third.

== Election results ==
2011 Canadian federal election: Berthier—Maskinongé
Party	Candidate	Votes	%	±%	Expenditures
New Democratic	Ruth Ellen Brosseau	22,484	39.63	+29.19	$0
Bloc Québécois	Guy André	16,668	29.38	−16.45	$48,739
Liberal	Francine Gaudet	8,109	14.29	−4.15	$32,253
Conservative	Marie-Claude Godue	7,909	13.94	−8.25	$23,495
Green	Léonie Matteau	1,193	2.10	−1.01	$0
Rhinoceros	Martin Jubinville	375	0.66		$0
Total votes/expense limit		56,738	100.0		$94,930
Source: "Berthier—Maskinongé election results". Elections Canada. May 2, 2011.
