= Jean Damphousse =

Canadian politician (born 1952)

MNA for Maskinongé
- In office April 25, 2007 – November 5, 2008
- Preceded by: Francine Gaudet
- Succeeded by: Jean-Paul Diamond

Personal details
- Born: June 24, 1952 (age 73) Saint-Paulin, Quebec, Canada
- Party: Action démocratique du Québec; Coalition Avenir Québec
- Spouse: Sylvie Grenier

Jean Damphousse (born June 24, 1952) is a politician from Quebec, Canada. He was an Action démocratique du Québec Member of the National Assembly for the electoral district of Maskinongé from 2007 to 2008.

Born in Saint-Paulin, Quebec, Damphousse holds a bachelor's degree in business administration from the Université du Québec à Trois-Rivières and a master's degree in project management from the Université de Sherbrooke. He was the owner of several local firms in the Maskinongé and Saint-Ursule areas.

Before his election, he served as mayor of Sainte-Ursule as well as a councillor. He also worked for the Chamber of Commerce of Louiseville, the Maskinongé Municipal Regional Counsel, and the Maskinongé health and social service centre.

Damphousse was first elected in the 2007 election with 40% of the vote. Liberal incumbent Francine Gaudet finished second with 29% of the vote. Damphousse took office on April 12, 2007.

In the 2012 election he ran unsuccessfully for the CAQ in Maskinongé.
