= Moïse Houde =

Canadian politician

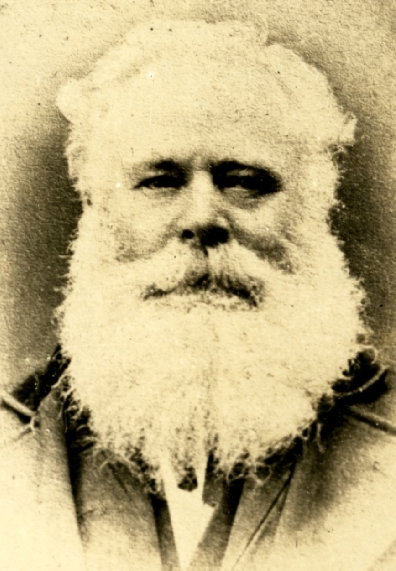

Member of the Legislative Assembly of the Province of Canada for Maskinongé
- In office 1863–1867
- Preceded by: George Caron
- Succeeded by: British North America Act 1867

Member of the Legislative Assembly of Quebec for Maskinongé
- In office 1871–1878
- Preceded by: Alexis Lesieur Desaulniers
- Succeeded by: Édouard Caron

Personal details
- Born: February 11, 1811 Rivière-du-Loup (Louiseville), Lower Canada
- Died: July 23, 1885 (aged 74) Louiseville, Quebec
- Relations: Frédéric Houde, nephew

Moïse Houde (February 11, 1811 – July 23, 1885) was a politician in Quebec, Canada. He served as Member of the Legislative Assembly.

== Early life ==
He was born on February 11, 1811, in Louiseville, Mauricie, the son of Augustin Houde and Geneviève Foucher.

== Before 1867 ==
Houde ran for a seat to the Legislative Assembly of the Province of Canada in the district of Maskinongé in 1861, but was defeated by Parti bleu incumbent George Caron.

He ran again in 1863 and won. He sat with the members of the Parti rouge.

== After 1867 ==
After the British North America Act 1867 was enacted, Houde joined the Liberal Party. He ran for a seat in the district of Maskinongé to both the House of Commons and the Legislative Assembly of Quebec, but was defeated on all accounts.

He ran again in 1871 and was elected to the provincial legislature. He was re-elected as a Conservative in 1875, but was defeated in 1878.

Houde's nephew Frédéric Houde served as a member of the House of Commons from 1878 to 1884.

== Death ==
He died on July 23, 1885.
