= Louis Boyer (merchant) =

Canadian mason & merchant (1795–1870)

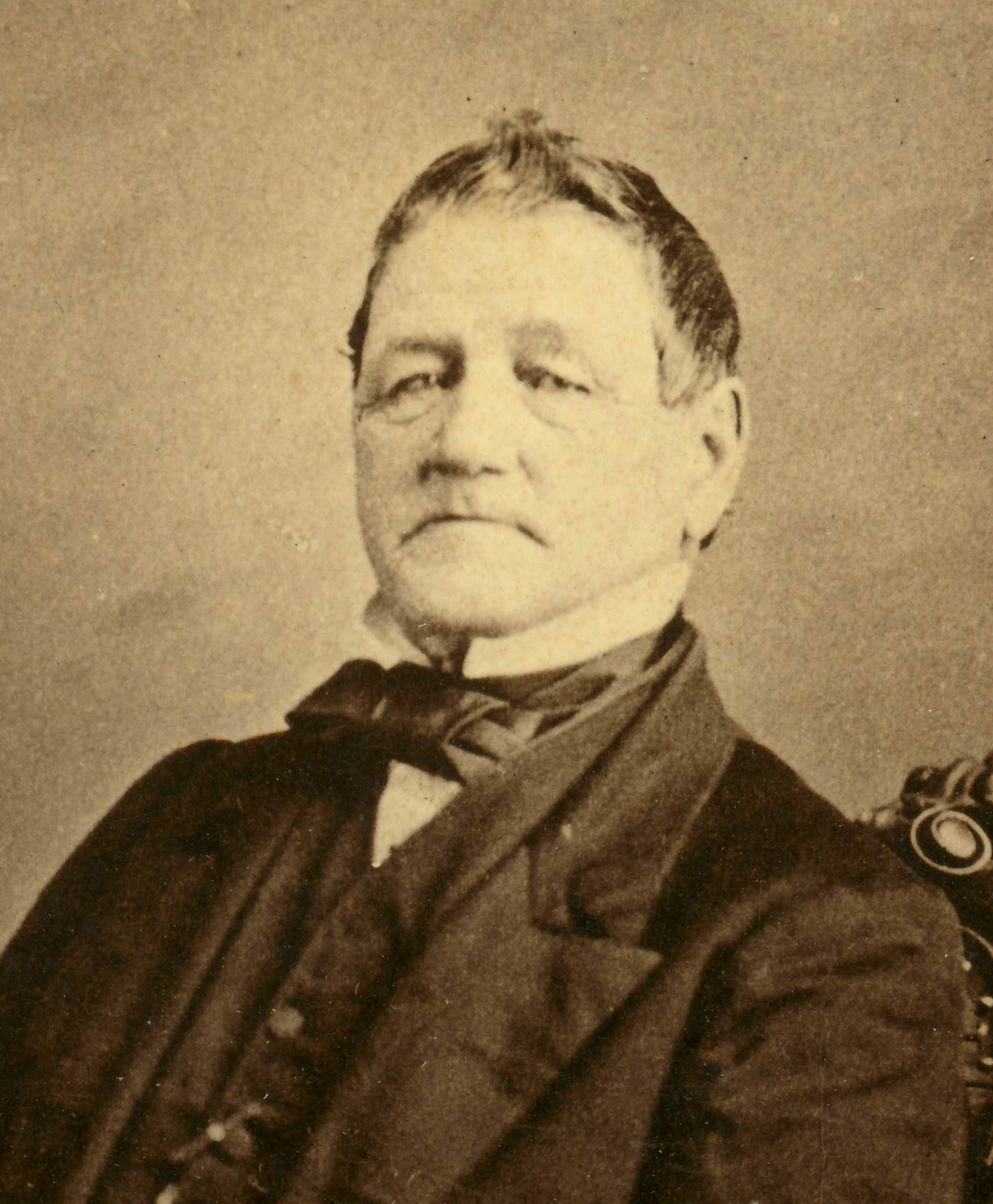

Louis Boyer (November 30, 1795 – December 21, 1870) was a mason, merchant and land owner in Quebec. He also signed his surname as Boyer, dit Quintal. Boyer Street (French: Rue Boyer) in Montreal is named after him.

== Early years ==
He was born in Montreal, the son of François Boyer and Josette Boutonne.

== Career ==
He was employed in the construction of the Rideau Canal and the prison at Kingston. Later, Boyer became a merchant dealing in pork, beef, butter and cheese. In 1832 he formed a partnership dealing in bacon, furs and other goods with Joseph Vallée, Fleury-Théodore Serre dit Saint-Jean and Philippe Turcot Sr. He also dealt in real estate and, by the time of his death, he had become one of the largest property owners in Montreal. He also was a director of the Montreal City and District Savings Bank and the Banque Jacques Cartier, as well as a member of the Montreal Board of Trade.

== Death ==
Boyer died in Montreal at the age of 75.

== Family ==
Boyer was married twice: to Elisabeth Mathieu, dit Laramée in 1820 and to Marie-Aurélie Mignault in 1836. Boyer later partnered in business with his sons and, when he retired from business in 1868, control of the business passed to his two oldest sons. His son Louis-Alphonse served in the House of Commons and his son Arthur served in the Quebec assembly and the Canadian senate.
