= Hector Caron =

Canadian politician (1862–1937)

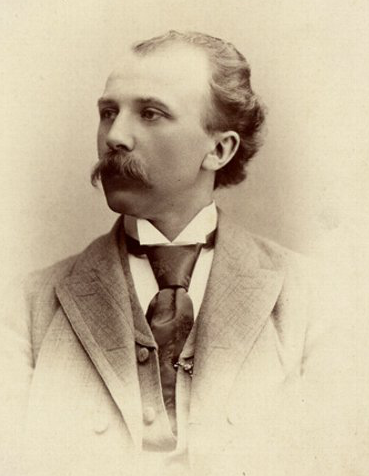

Member of the Legislative Assembly of Quebec for Maskinongé
- In office 1892–1904
- Preceded by: Joseph Lessard
- Succeeded by: Georges Lafontaine

Personal details
- Born: August 31, 1862 Saint-Léon (now Saint-Léon-le-Grand), Canada East
- Died: April 9, 1937 (aged 74) Quebec City, Quebec
- Party: Liberal

Hector Caron (August 31, 1862 – April 9, 1937) was a politician in the Quebec, Canada. He served as Member of the Legislative Assembly.

== Early life ==
He was born on August 31, 1862, in Saint-Léon, Mauricie.

== Provincial Politics ==
Caron ran as a Liberal candidate to the Legislative Assembly of Quebec in 1892 in the district of Maskinongé. He defeated Conservative incumbent Joseph Lessard. He was re-elected in 1897 and 1900.

His last election was declared void though. A by-election was called to settle the matter, which he lost against Conservative candidate Georges Lafontaine.

== Death ==
He died on April 9, 1937.
