= Maskinongé (federal electoral district) =

Former federal electoral district in Quebec, Canada

Quebec electoral district

Defunct federal electoral district
- Legislature: House of Commons
- District created: 1867
- District abolished: 1924
- First contested: 1867
- Last contested: 1921

Maskinongé (French pronunciation: [maskinɔ̃ʒe]) was a federal electoral district in Quebec, Canada, that was represented in the House of Commons of Canada from 1867 to 1925.

It was created by the British North America Act, 1867, and was amalgamated into the Berthier—Maskinongé electoral district in 1924.

== Members of Parliament ==
This riding elected the following members of Parliament:

Parliament	Years	Member	Party
Maskinongé
1st	1867–1872	George Caron	Conservative
2nd	1872–1874	Louis-Alphonse Boyer	Liberal
3rd	1874–1878	Louis-Alphonse Boyer	Liberal
4th	1878–1882	Frédéric Houde	Nationalist Conservative
5th	1882–1884	Frédéric Houde	Nationalist Conservative
5th	1884–1887	Alexis Lesieur Desaulniers	Conservative
6th	1887–1891	Charles Jérémie Coulombe	Conservative
7th	1891–1896	Joseph-Hormisdas Legris	Liberal
8th	1896–1900	Joseph-Hormisdas Legris	Liberal
9th	1900–1903	Joseph-Hormisdas Legris	Liberal
9th	1903–1904	Hormidas Mayrand	Liberal
10th	1904–1908	Hormidas Mayrand	Liberal
11th	1908–1911	Hormidas Mayrand	Liberal
12th	1911–1917	Adélard Bellemare	Independent Conservative
13th	1917–1921	Hormidas Mayrand	Opposition (Laurier Liberals)
14th	1921–1925	Eugène Desrochers	Liberal
Riding dissolved into Berthier—Maskinongé

== Election results ==
1867 Canadian federal election
Party	Candidate	Votes
Conservative	George Caron	702
Unknown	Moïse Houde	564

1872 Canadian federal election
Party	Candidate	Votes
Liberal	Louis-Alphonse Boyer	910
Conservative	George Caron	681

1874 Canadian federal election
Party	Candidate	Votes
Liberal	Louis-Alphonse Boyer	764
Conservative	George Caron	607

1878 Canadian federal election
Party	Candidate	Votes
Nationalist Conservative	Frédéric Houde	838
Conservative	Alexis Lesieur Desaulniers	296
Unknown	Yale	279

1882 Canadian federal election
Party	Candidate	Votes
Nationalist Conservative	Frédéric Houde	1,084
Conservative	George Caron	765

By-election: On Mr. Houde's death, 15 November 1884

Canadian federal by-election, 22 November 1884
Party	Candidate	Votes
Conservative	Alexis Lesieur Desaulniers	607
Unknown	Charles Jérémie Coulombe	570
Unknown	D. L. Laflèche	310

1887 Canadian federal election
Party	Candidate	Votes
Conservative	Charles Jérémie Coulombe	1,003
Nationalist	Alexis Lesieur Desaulniers	997

1891 Canadian federal election
Party	Candidate	Votes
Liberal	Joseph-Hormisdas Legris	1,153
Conservative	Charles Jérémie Coulombe	1,045

1896 Canadian federal election
Party	Candidate	Votes
Liberal	Joseph-Hormisdas Legris	1,384
Conservative	Charles Jérémie Coulombe	1,094

1900 Canadian federal election
Party	Candidate	Votes
Liberal	Joseph-Hormisdas Legris	1,400
Conservative	Adolphe-Philippe Caron	901
Independent	Alexis Lesieur Desaulniers	25

By-election: On Mr. Legris being called to the Senate, 10 February 1903

By-election on 3 March 1903
Party	Candidate	Votes
Liberal	Hormidas Mayrand	acclaimed

1904 Canadian federal election
Party	Candidate	Votes
Liberal	Hormidas Mayrand	1,480
Conservative	J. Alphonse Comeau	1,188
Unknown	T. Thisdel	22

1908 Canadian federal election
Party	Candidate	Votes
Liberal	Hormidas Mayrand	1,500
Unknown	Joseph Foisy	1,167

1911 Canadian federal election
Party	Candidate	Votes
Independent Conservative	Adélard Bellemare	1,507
Liberal	Hormidas Mayrand	1,398

1917 Canadian federal election
Party	Candidate	Votes
Opposition (Laurier Liberals)	Hormidas Mayrand	2,721
Unknown	Adolphe-Joseph Thibodeau	219
Unknown	George Lafontaine	165

1921 Canadian federal election
Party	Candidate	Votes
Liberal	Eugène Desrochers	4,128
Independent Conservative	Adélard Bellemare	1,991

== See also ==
- List of Canadian electoral districts
- Mauricie
- Historical federal electoral districts of Canada
