= Maskinongé (Province of Canada electoral district) =

Electoral district of the Parliament of the Province of Canada

Province of Canada electoral district

Defunct pre-Confederation electoral district
- Legislature: Legislative Assembly of the Province of Canada
- District created: 1853
- District abolished: 1867
- First contested: 1854
- Last contested: 1863

Maskinongé was an electoral district of the Legislative Assembly of the Province of Canada in Canada East. It was located in the current Mauricie area, on the north shore of the River Saint Lawrence, southwest of the electoral district of Saint-Maurice. Maskinongé was created in a redistribution in 1853, and was first used in the general elections of 1854.

Maskinongé was represented by one member in the Legislative Assembly.

The electoral district was abolished in 1867, upon the creation of Canada and the province of Quebec.

== Members of the Legislative Assembly (1854–1867) ==
Maskinongé was a single-member constituency.

The following were the members of the Legislative Assembly for Maskinongé. The party affiliations are based on the biographies of individual members given by the National Assembly of Quebec, as well as votes in the Legislative Assembly. "Party" was a fluid concept, especially during the early years of the Province of Canada.

Parliament	Members	Years in Office	Party
5th Parliament; 1854–1857	Joseph-Édouard Turcotte	1854–1857	Ministerialist
6th Parliament; 1858–1861	Louis-Honoré Gauvreau (Note: Gauvreau died in office, October 30, 1858: Côté, Political Appointments and Elections in the Province of Canada, 1841 to 1860, p. 63, note (218).)	1858	Bleu
6th Parliament; 1858–1861	George Caron (Note: Caron was elected in a by-election, December 14, 1858: Côté, Political Appointments and Elections in the Province of Canada, 1841 to 1860, p. 63, note (219).)	1858–1861 (by-election)	Bleu
7th Parliament; 1861–1863	George Caron	1861–1863	Bleu
8th Parliament; 1863–1867	Moïse Houde	1863–1867	Anti-Confederation; Rouge

== Abolition ==
The district was abolished on July 1, 1867, when the British North America Act, 1867 came into force, creating Canada and splitting the Province of Canada into Quebec and Ontario. It was succeeded by electoral districts of the same name in the House of Commons of Canada and the Legislative Assembly of Quebec.

== See also ==
- List of elections in the Province of Canada
