= Notre Dame des Neiges Cemetery =

Cemetery in Montreal, Canada

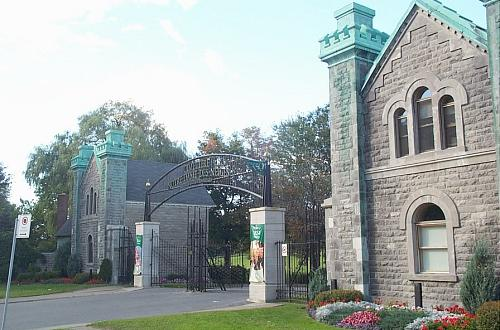
- Front entrance, Notre Dame des Neiges Cemetery
- Interactive map of Notre Dame des Neiges Cemetery

Details
- Established: 1854
- Location: 4601, chemin de la Côte-des-Neiges; Montreal, Quebec, Canada; H3V 1E7
- Coordinates: 45°30′06″N 73°36′22″W
- Type: Originally Roman Catholic, open to all Christian burials
- Style: Rural cemetery
- Size: 139 hectares (340 acres)
- No. of graves: 65,000+
- No. of interments: 1 million
- Website: www.cimetierenotredamedesneiges.ca

National Historic Site of Canada
- Official name: Notre-Dame-des-Neiges Cemetery
- Designated: 1999-05-04
- Reference no.: 1864

Notre Dame des Neiges Cemetery (French: Cimetière Notre-Dame-des-Neiges, pronounced [simtjɛʁ nɔtʁə dam de nɛʒ]) is a 139-hectare (340-acre) rural cemetery located in the borough of Côte-des-Neiges-Notre-Dame-de-Grâce, Montreal, Quebec, Canada, which was founded in 1854. The entrance and the grounds run along a part of Côte-des-Neiges Road and up the slopes of Mount Royal. Notre Dame des Neiges Cemetery is the largest cemetery in Canada by number of burials and the third-largest in North America.

== History and description ==
Created on property purchased from Dr. Pierre Beaubien, the new cemetery was a response to growing demand at a time when the old Saint-Antoine Cemetery (near present-day Dorchester Square) had become too small to serve Montreal's rapidly increasing population. Founded in 1854 as a garden cemetery in the French style, it was designed by landscape architect Henri-Maurice Perreault, who studied rural cemeteries in Boston and New York. On May 29, 1855, thirty-five-year-old Jane Gilroy McCready, wife of Thomas McCready, then a Montreal municipal councillor, was the first person to be buried in the new cemetery.

Notre Dame des Neiges is the largest cemetery in Canada with more than 55 kilometres (34 mi) of lanes and one million people interred. The Notre Dame des Neiges Cemetery site has more than 65,000 monuments and 71 family vaults.

The cemetery originally served Roman Catholics and rural French Canadians. Italian, Portuguese, Japanese, Orthodox Greek, Polish, Ukrainian and Huron are also represented, indicated in many instances by ethnic motifs on gravestones. The cemetery is adjacent to the Mount Royal Cemetery, a predominantly English-speaking and originally Protestant adjacent burial ground, the Shaar Hashomayim Cemetery, an Ashkenazi Jewish burial ground and Temple Emanu-El Cemetery, a Reformed Jewish burial ground. These four abutting cemeteries on the slopes of Mount Royal contain a total of 1.5 million burials.

"La Pietà Mausoleum" contains a life-sized marble reproduction of Michelangelo's Pietà sculpture (original located in St. Peter's Basilica at the Vatican). Notre Dame des Neiges Cemetery was designated a National Historic Site of Canada in 1998 and plaqued in 2004.

No burials or cremations took place between May 16, 2007, and September 11, 2007, because of a labour strike. The interments of more than 300 bodies were affected. In addition, its uncut, unkempt grass became a symbol of the labour dispute.

Due to its vast size, locating a specific grave can be difficult. As a result, the cemetery now offers a computerized mapping service that allows visitors to quickly and accurately locate graves. It can be accessed at the cemetery using a touch screen display or via the Internet.

== War graves ==
The only opening in the fence between the Notre Dame des Neiges and Mount Royal cemeteries is where two adjoining military sections are. Shortly after World War I, to emphasize the comradeship and uniformity of sacrifice of Protestant and Catholic soldiers, the Imperial War Graves Commission insisted on an open passage between the two plots and the Cross of Sacrifice was erected. There are 445 identified Commonwealth service war grave burials commemorated here, 252 from World War I and 215 from World War II. Those whose graves could not be individually marked are named on bronze plaques attached to the Cross of Sacrifice. The Quebec Memorial on the National Field of Honour at Pointe-Claire lists 24 servicemen buried here, whose graves could no longer be marked or maintained, as alternative commemorations.

== New mausoleums ==
Every mausoleum in Notre Dame des Neiges Cemetery contains multiple crypts, clearly identified, as well as columbaria with glass or marble niches for one or more urns. The first mausoleum, Notre Dame, dedicated to the Blessed Virgin Mary, was built in 1978. The others were added gradually in the years that followed: John-Paul II (1980), Saint-Francis (1982), Marguerite-Bourgeoys (1983), The Pietà (1985), Saints Peter and Paul (1989), Sainte Clare of Assisi (1994), the two-storey Saint Marguerite d'Youville (1996) and most recently, Esther-Blondin (2007).

Opened in November 2007, the Esther Blondin Mausoleum, named after the founder of the Sisters of Saint Anne, houses 6,000 burial crypts and niches.

== Notre Dame des Neiges Cemetery ==
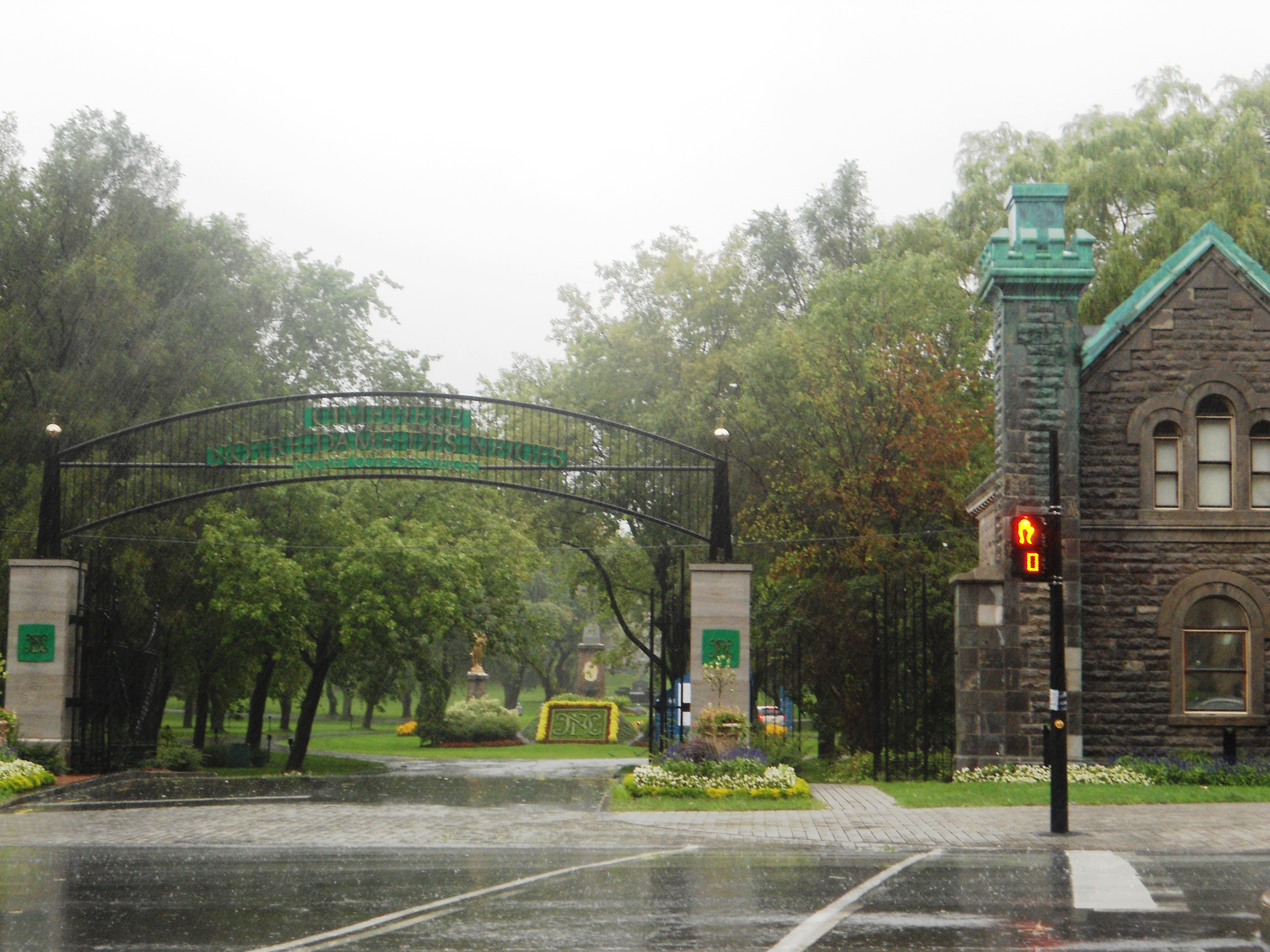

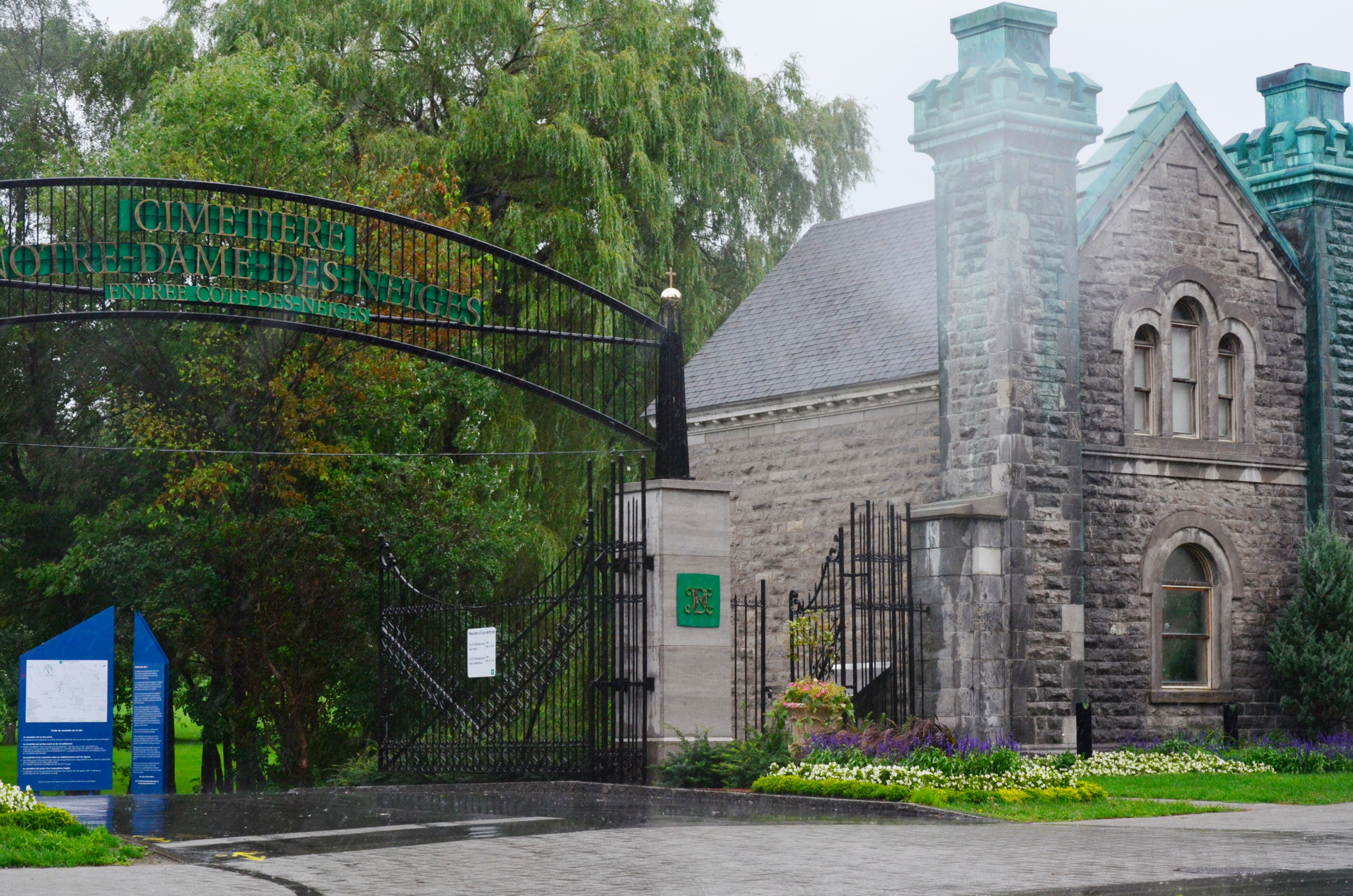

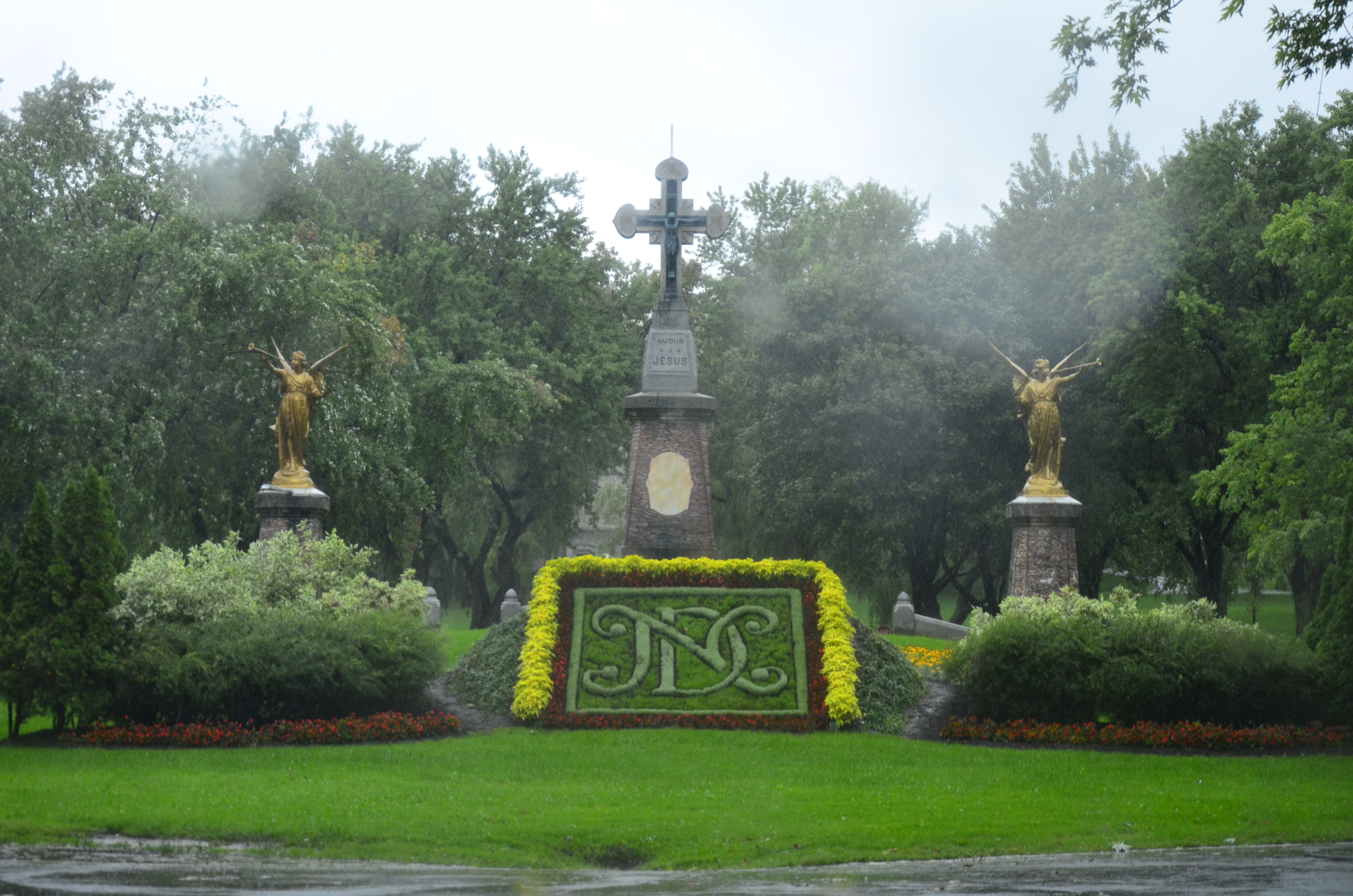

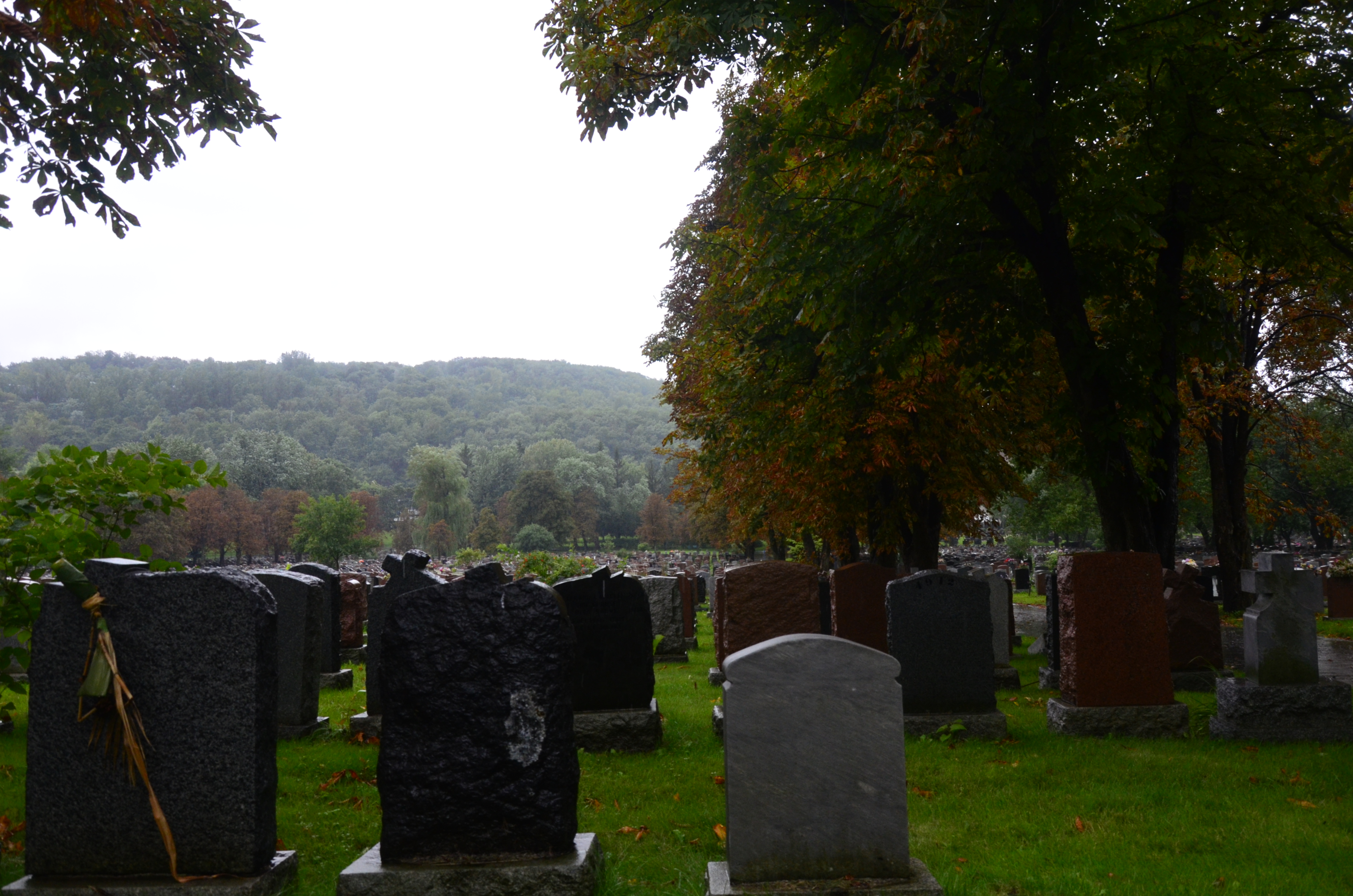

== Notable interments ==
The cemetery is the final resting place for a number of former mayors of the city of Montreal plus other prominent persons including:

- René Angélil (1942–2016), manager, husband of Canadian singer Céline Dion
- William H. Atherton MBE (1867–1950), writer, historian, academic and scholar
- Raoul Barré (1874–1932), cartoonist
- Jean-Louis Beaudry (1809–1886), entrepreneur, politician
- Joseph Béland (1843–1929), politician
- Trefflé Berthiaume (1848–1915), politician
- Bernard Bissonnette (1898–1964), politician
- Richard Blass (1945–1975), criminal
- Charlotte Boisjoli (1923–2001), writer, actress
- Tancrède Boucher de Grosbois (1846–1926), physician and politician
- Henri Bourassa (1868–1952), politician, publisher
- Robert Bourassa (1933–1996), Premier of Quebec
- Pierre Bourgault (1934–2003), politician, intellectual
- Romuald Bourque (1889–1974), businessman and politician
- Arthur Boyer (1851–1922), politician
- François-Philippe Brais (1894–1972), lawyer, politician
- Dino Bravo (1948–1993), WWF wrestler
- Donald Brittain (1928–1989), film director
- Francine Brunel-Reeves (1933–2018), singer, caller and researcher
- Gilles Carle (1928–2009), film director
- Ken Carter (1938–1983), stuntman
- Thérèse Forget Casgrain (1896–1981), feminist, reformer and stateswoman
- Joseph Cattarinich (1881–1938), hockey player and businessman
- Lorne Chabot (1900–1946), NHL ice-hockey goalie
- Joseph-Adolphe Chapleau (1840–1898), lawyer, publisher, politician
- Ernest Cormier (1885–1980), architect
- Vincenzo Cotroni (1911–1984), mobster
- Léo Dandurand (1889–1964), businessman and hockey coach
- Alexandre-Maurice Delisle (1810–1880), businessman, statesman
- Jérémie-Louis Décarie (1870–1927), politician
- Alphonse Desjardins (1854–1920), founder of the Desjardins financial coops
- Bernard Devlin (1824–1880), politician
- General Jacques Dextraze (1919–1993), Chief of Defence Staff Canada 1972–1977
- Jean Drapeau (1916–1999), Mayor of Montreal
- Lewis Thomas Drummond (1813–1882), jurist, politician
- Charles Duquette (1869–1937), mayor of Montreal (1924–1926)
- Ludger Duvernay (1799–1852), founder of Quebec's Société St-Jean-Baptiste
- Edmond Dyonnet (1859–1954), painter
- Pierre Falardeau (1946–2009), film director, screenwriter, writer
- Marcel Faribault (1908–1972), notary and legislative adviser
- Claire Fauteux (1889–1988), painter
- Gérald Fauteux (1900–1980), Chief Justice of Canada
- Amédée-Emmanuel Forget (1847–1923), Lieutenant Governor of the Northwest Territories and Saskatchewan
- Louis-Joseph Forget (1853–1911), financier and president of the Montreal Stock Exchange.
- Sir Rodolphe Forget (1861–1919), financier, statesman, president of the Montreal Stock Exchange.
- Jacob Yale Fortier (1888–1940), wealthy judge for Montreal-East, partner of Senator Jacob Nicol.
- Joseph-Achille Francoeur (1882–1959), politician
- Clarence Gagnon (1881–1942), painter, engraver, illustrator
- Jean Gascon (1921–1988), stage and film actor/director
- Roger Gaudry (1913–2001), chemist, businessman, and rector of the Université de Montréal
- Conrad Gauthier (1886–1964), singer/songwriter
- Joseph Gauthier (1877–1934), politician
- Gratien Gélinas (1904–1999), actor, author, playwright
- Sir Lomer Gouin, (1861–1929), Lieutenant Governor and Premier of Quebec
- Robert Gravel (1945–1996), actor
- Joseph Guibord (1809–1869), patriot, buried through a court order in the Guibord case
- Doug Harvey (1924–1989), ice-hockey Hall of Fame defenceman
- Louis-Philippe Hébert (1850–1917), sculptor
- Camillien Houde (1889–1958), statesman, Mayor of Montreal
- Harry Hyland (1889–1969), Hall of Fame ice-hockey player
- Henri Julien (1852–1908), lithographer, painter, illustrator, caricaturist, reporter
- Charles Laberge (1827–1874), journalist and politician
- Eugène Lafontaine (1857–1935), politician
- Sir Louis-Hippolyte Lafontaine (1807–1864), jurist, politician
- Alfred Laliberté (1878–1953), sculptor
- Pierre Laporte (1921–1970), statesman assassinated by FLQ terrorists
- Calixa Lavallée (1842–1891), composer of "O Canada"
- René Lecavalier (1918–1999), sports commentator
- Marc Lépine (1964–1989), mass murderer
- J. Louis Lévesque (1911–1994) stockbroker, philanthropist, horse racing builder
- Jean-Claude Malépart (1938–1989), politician
- Joséphine Marchand (1861–1925), journalist and women's rights activist
- Nick Auf der Maur (1942–1998), journalist, politician
- André Mathieu (1929–1968), composer
- Charles Mayer (1901–1971), journalist, sportsperson and politician
- John Wait McGauvran (1827–1884), businessman and politician
- Thomas D'Arcy McGee (1825–1868), journalist, statesman, Father of Confederation
- Honoré Mercier (1840–1894), statesman
- Arthur Mignault (1865–1937), pharmaceutical entrepreneur, colonel of the RCAMC, founder of the Royal 22^{e} Régiment
- Pierre-Basile Mignault (1878–1929), Puisne Justice Supreme Court of Canada
- Jos Montferrand (1802–1864), strong man
- Denise Morelle (1926–1984), actress
- Brian Mulroney (1939–2024), 18th prime minister of Canada
- Pierre Nadeau (1936–2019), Canadian journalist, television presenter and producer
- Émile Nelligan (1879–1941), poet
- Robert Nelson (1794–1873), medical practitioner, statesman
- John Ostell (1813–1892), architect
- Gédéon Ouimet (1823–1905), lawyer, politician, Premier of the Province of Quebec
- Philippe Panneton (1895–1960), writer, physician, diplomat
- Denis-Émery Papineau (1819–1899), politician
- Jean Papineau-Couture (1916–2000), composer
- Alice Poznanska-Parizeau (1930–1990), writer
- Damase Parizeau (1841–1915), politician
- Lise Payette (1931–2018), politician
- Pierre Péladeau (1925–1997), businessman, media mogul
- Denise Pelletier (1923–1976), actress
- Narcisse Pérodeau (1851–1932), lawyer, law professor, politician, Lieutenant Governor of the Province of Quebec
- Maurice Perrault (1857–1909), architect and politician
- Maurice Richard (1921–2000), Hall of Fame ice-hockey player
- Jean-Paul Riopelle (1923–2002), painter and sculptor
- Yvon Robert (1914–1971), professional wrestler
- Jean "Johnny" Rougeau (1929–1983), professional wrestler
- Alice Ryan (1830 – 1906), railway heiress, socialite and suffragette
- Jeanne Sauvé (1922–1993), politician and Governor General of Canada
- Idola Saint-Jean (1875–1945), journalist and women's rights advocate
- Lhasa de Sela (1972–2010), singer-songwriter
- Lord Thomas George Shaughnessy (1853–1923), President of CPR
- Henri-Thomas Taschereau Chief justice of Quebec (1907–1909), journalist, politician, and judge; b. 6 October 1841
- Louis-Olivier Taillon (1840–1923), Quebec Premier (1892–1896)
- Mary Travers, "La Bolduc" (1894–1941), singer
- Denis-Benjamin Viger (1774–1861), Joint premier of the Province of Canada
- Paolo Violi (1931–1978), mobster
- Charles Wilson (1808–1877), businessman, mayor of Montreal
- Joseph-Marcellin Wilson (1859–1940), financier, philanthropist, statesman
- Arthur Yale (1860–1917), politician, cofounder of Plateau-Mount Royal

== See also ==
- Mount Royal Park
