= Tourism in Mauricie =

Mauricie tourism represents an important sector of Québec’s economy with 1.2 to 1.5 million visitors each year who spend 200 to 300 million dollars per year in tourist attractions and services. In 2011, 90% of tourists in Mauricie were Quebecers, 3% came from other Canadian provenances, 2% from the United States, and 4% from others.

== Territory of La Mauricie ==
The region covers 40,000 square kilometres (15,000 sq mi) in boreal forest with the main watershed Saint-Maurice River, including lakes and rivers. Within its boundaries, the region has one of the oldest places of occupation in Quebec, Trois-Rivières founded in 1634, the second largest city in New France. The region holds the oldest manors and several cantons. The region has taken place among the most important phases in the history of Quebec (fur trade, metallurgy, forestry, hydropower, industrialization, etc..).

The Mauricie is one of the 22 tourist areas in Quebec. Its territory is the same as Mauricie administrative region of the same name. Between Montreal and Quebec City, it is divided into six sub-areas or sectors which correspond to the divisions of the three cities and three regional county municipalities: Trois-Rivières, Shawinigan, La Tuque, Maskinongé, Les Chenaux Regional County Municipality, Mekinac Regional County Municipality. The tourist region has 42 municipalities and 7 union territories.

Mauricie owes its name to the Saint-Maurice River that crosses the region from St. Lawrence River to the north.

== History of tourism ==
In 1634, Samuel de Champlain sent Sieur de Laviolette to establish a new fort that was also used as a fur trading post. The term "Mauricie" is used for the first time in 1933 by Bishop Albert Tessier to denote the region since Trois-Rivières to the gates of Lac Saint-Jean. Before that date, it was simply called the Valley of Saint-Maurice.

The origin of tourism in Mauricie is as old as the establishment of the region itself. When Idebon Raclos came to renew his three daughters in 1671, he remained for a time to settle in Mauricie then returned to France by the last vessel. It is unknown why he left but speculated that his motivation was to visit family, the story does not say. It was costly and difficult to return to France from Québec during that time.

In the 18th century, the population of the Mauricie was renowned for its welcoming people. People settled along the Chemin du Roy (King's Road), the first tourist route in the Mauricie. In 1749, the Swedish Pehr Kalm wrote: "Few foreign cities in which people in word and deed, welcome someone with much politeness than does the farmer in all areas of the Canadian campaign (St. Lawrence Valley)".

In 1760, just weeks after the Conquest of New France, The British Magazine highlights a corner of the Mauricie publishing a print showing a picturesque view of Trois-Rivières, accompanied a short text which refers to the romantic situation, the wealth of the inhabitants, their well-built houses, their production and their fisheries. This is perhaps the most notable tourist promotion. And in 1825 the first tourist guides began going to the major attraction, the falls of Shawinigan, already famous, at least since 1816, with artists and travelers. Joseph-Édouard Turcotte began construction of a 100 room hotel in 1858 which he intended to attract American tourists, but the building remained unfinished.

Later the American guides present the saline Saint-Léon as a mecca for health tourism. A hotel (1849–1906) that was built there with 154 rooms (as large as the current Delta Trois-Rivières), a pavilion, bathroom, billiards, bowling, tennis, croquet, etc. During the summer season, it was the appointment of the Canadian and American elite. In 1905, its 450 residents overflowed into the houses that had opened in the area.

Known for its forests, Mauricie host many hunters and fishermen. From before 1850 Private clubs received famous visitors such as parents of John F. Kennedy. It is said that going to Saint-Alexis-des-Monts, Americans stopped at the post office of the rank of Bout-du-Monde (1908–1952), at Saint-Paulin, there to be stamped with the seal of their letters Bout-du-Monde! The Winchester Club, founded in 1880 in Saint-Élie-de-Caxton is one of the first clubs in Quebec. These clubs have given way to ZECS (Controlled harvesting zone), Quebec Wildlife Reserves, outfitters and the La Mauricie National Park.

Religiously, the miracle eye of Notre-Dame-du-Cap Basilica in 1888 marks the launch of pilgrimages. The same founder, Father Frederic, another site attracted religious tourists at the end of 19th century: the plight of Saint-Élie-de-Caxton replica of the Via Dolorosa in Jerusalem. Many tourists in the United States or elsewhere in Canada traveled to these two places. In Cap-de-la-Madeleine, a branch of the railway line will be called the Rosary.

This tourist excitement to the origins of tourism in Mauricie was desired and noted: in 1936, Bishop Albert Tessier reported that foreign customers is important, 24,000 Foreign cars are enumerated at bridge Grand-Mère.

Today, Mauricie is one of the busiest tourist areas in Quebec. In 2010 the region had than 1.5 million tourists who spent $298 million to the regional economy. A proportion of 13% of these expenditures are made by tourists from outside Quebec. Even today it continues to be renowned for its natural attractions, cultural attractions, its municipalities and adventure tourism.

=== Tourism subregions ===
The development and enhancement of tourism products and services in the Mauricie are grouped within six tourism sub-regions whose areas correspond to two of the three big cities and three regional county municipalities.

=== Trois-Rivières ===
Since the municipal mergers of 2002, the territory of the city of Trois-Rivières is composed of group of six former municipalities: Sainte-Marthe-du-Cap, Cap-de-la-Madeleine, Trois-Rivières, Trois-Rivières, Pointe-du-Lac and Saint-Louis-de-France.

=== Shawinigan ===
Since the municipal mergers of 2002, the territory of the city of Shawinigan is composed of the group of eight former municipalities: Shawinigan, Shawinigan-Sud, Lac-à-la-Tortue, Saint-Georges, Saint-Gérard-des-Laurentides, Saint-Jean-des-Piles and Grand-Mère, which already included Sainte-Flore.

=== Agglomeration of La Tuque ===
The La Tuque (urban agglomeration) was created in 2006 to consolidate the city of La Tuque, the two municipalities La Bostonnais and Lac-Édouard, and three Indian reserves Coucoucache, Obedjiwan and Wemotaci.

Since the 2002 municipal mergers and divisions in 2006, the territory of the town of La Tuque is composed of the combination of three former municipalities, La Tuque, Parent and La Croche, and eight former unorganized territories, Petit-Lac-Wayagamac, Lac-des-Moires, Lac-Tourlay, Kiskissink, Lac-Berlinguet, Rivière-Windigo, Lac-Pellerin and Obedjiwan.

=== Les Chenaux ===
The territory of the tourist subregion Les Chenaux corresponds to the territory of the regional county municipality of the same name. It is composed of ten municipalities: Batiscan, Champlain, Notre-Dame-du-Mont-Carmel, Sainte-Anne-de-la-Pérade, Sainte-Geneviève-de-Batiscan, Saint-Luc-de-Vincennes, Saint-Maurice, Saint-Narcisse, Saint-Prosper and Saint-Stanislas.

=== Maskinongé ===
The territory of the tourism sub-region "Maskinongé" is the territory of the regional county municipality of the same name. It consists of seventeen municipalities: Charette, Louiseville, Maskinongé, Saint-Alexis-des-Monts, Saint-Barnabé, Saint-Boniface, Sainte-Angèle-de-Prémont, Saint-Édouard-de-Maskinongé, Saint-Élie-de-Caxton, Saint-Étienne-des-Grès, Sainte-Ursule, Saint-Justin, Saint-Léon-le-Grand, Saint-Mathieu-du-Parc, Saint-Paulin, Saint-Séverin and Yamachiche.

=== Mekinac ===
The territory of the tourist subregion "Mekinac" is the territory of the regional county municipality of the same name. It is composed of ten municipalities and four unorganized territories: Grandes-Piles, Hérouxville, Lac-aux-Sables, Lac-Boulé (TNO), Lac-Masketsi (TNO) Lac-Normand (TNO), Notre-Dame-de-Montauban, Rivière-de-la-Savane (TNO), Saint-Adelphe, Sainte-Thècle, Saint-Roch-de-Mékinac, Saint-Severin, Saint-Tite and Trois-Rives.

== Performance ==
- 1111 Associated companies in the tourism sector (2009)
- 7031 camping sites (2009)
- 2514 accommodation establishments (2009)
- 4000 tourism jobs (annual average in 2009)

Words like "Tourist", "Tripper" and "Visitor" are not to be confused with each other. In 2010, 1,484,000 tourists of all backgrounds have traveled in the Mauricie region for a total of 3,624,000 nights and spent $298 000 000. On average, each stay lasted 2.4 nights in which every tourist has spent a total of $201 or $82 per night.

Tourist in Mauricie in 2010	Quebec	Other Canadian provinces	United States	Other countries	total
Volume (000)	1356 (6.4%)	50 (1.4%)	15 (0.7%)	63 (3.4%)	1484 (5.2%)
Nights (000)	3179 (6.2%)	172 (1.5%)	35 (0.5%)	238 (1.8%)	3624000 (4.4%)
Expenditure ($ M)	260 (7.1%)	12 (1.0%)	4 (0.4%)	23 (2.1%)	298 (4.3%)

== Sightseeing ==
Attractions (134)	Accommodation (334)	Event (29)	Tourist Circuit (6)	Other (102)
Cruise (29)	Hotels (81)	Party / Festival / Event (20)	Route des Rivières	Restaurants (59)
Museum / interpretation center / historic site (23)	Chalet, condo and tourist residence (72)	Sporting event (7)	Chemin du Roy	Equipment and / recreational vehicle (8)
Cruise (29)	Bed and breakfast (58)	show and fair (2)	Culture and Entertainment	Auditorium / Theater (6)
Golf (15)	Outfitter (53)	-	Agrotourism	local tourism promotion agency (5)
Track / path (13)	Camping (43)	-	Outdoor	Tourist Information Office (5)
Company visit (12)	Holiday Centre (14)	-	Route cottages Quebec	Tourist information (4)
Agritourism Farm (12)	Rugged (8)	-	-	Airline (4)
Sugar shack (10)	Hostel (3)	-	-	Tourist Welcome Office (4)
Building and religious site (10)	Educational Institution (2)	-	-	Bus Company (3)
Centre relaxation / spa (10)	-	-	-	-

=== Key Benefits ===
Museum and exhibition center

- Borealis, history center of the paper industry
- Musée québécois de culture populaire
  - Old Prison of Trois-Rivières

Parks and Historic Sites

- National Historic Site of Canada Forges du Saint-Maurice
- Melville Island Park
- La Mauricie National Park
- Mastigouche Wildlife Reserve
- Saint-Maurice Wildlife Reserve
- Batiscan River Park

Lodges and cottages

- Outfitter White Lake;
- Hotel Sacacomie, Saint-Alexis-des-Monts
- Auberge Le Baluchon, Saint-Paulin
- Lordship of Triton, La Tuque
- Outfitter Club Odanak, Lac Castor, La Tuque
- Auberge Le Flores, Shawinigan
- Sugar Shack Chez Dany, Trois-Rivières

Tourist buildings

- Notre-Dame-du-Cap Basilica, in Trois-Rivières (sector "Cap-de-la-Madeleine")
- La Cité de l'Énergie (Energy City) in Shawinigan

Entertainment

- Mattawin Adventure Centre, Trois-Rives
- Ice Fishing of Chenaux fishes, Sainte-Anne-de-la-Pérade

=== Entertainment and Events ===
- Festival International de Danse Encore, Trois-Rivières
- Grand Prix Automobile de Trois-Rivières
- Festival Western de Saint-Tite (Western Festival of Saint-Tite)
- Festival International de la Poésie (International Poetry Festival), Trois-Rivières
- Le FestiVoix de Trois-Rivières (The VoiceFest of Trois-Rivières)
- Le Rendez-vous des peintres de Sainte-Flore (Painters rendez-vous of Sainte-Flore), Shawinigan

=== Tourist Circuits ===
Two main tours are highlighted in Mauricie. The first being Chemin du Roi (King's Road), a.k.a. the road 138, connects the cities of Québec and Montreal along the Shore North of the St. Lawrence River on the first paved road in Canada. As for the Route des Rivières, it highlights hydrography, mainly the Saint-Maurice River, the region offers many attractions along the way.

== Agritourism ==
Mauricie, has more than 100 companies offering diversified farm services: farms, maple, food, breweries, gardens, horticultural, tours, etc. These businesses offer a variety of local products and offer observation of several types of animals such as goats, bison, wild boar and deer. Some food companies offer local produce, such as cheeses, drinks, and meats. Examples of these companies:

1. Baker François Guay Inc, Trois-Rivières (sector Pointe-du-Lac)
2. Boutique Gourmande Amalthea, La Tuque
3. Sugar Shack Chez Dany, Trois-Rivières
4. Chèvrerie and Boutique Angélaine, Bécancour

== Accommodation ==
1. Tourist home, cottage, condo, studio (88)
2. Outfitter (73)
3. Hotel (68)
4. Bed and breakfast (63)
5. Camping (47)
6. Holiday Centre (13)
7. Unusual accommodation (9)
8. Other accommodation establishment (9)
9. Youth Hostel (3)
10. Other

== Infrastructure ==
=== Welcome and Information ===
Tourism Mauricie region offers tourists 4 permanent offices and 9 seasonal offices.

Permanent offices

- Culture and Tourism Corporation Grand-Mère
- Tourism Committee of Saint-Alexis-des-Monts
- Tourism Trois-Rivières
- Tourist Information Office (TIO) Les Chenaux

Seasonal offices

- Maskinongé
- Tourism Corporation Batiscan
- ILO CLD Shawinigan
- Tourist Office (TAO) Saint-Élie-de-Caxton
- Tourist information station (RIT) Louiseville, Parc des Ursulines
- RIT Saint-Édouard
- RIT Saint-Mathieu
- RIT Saint-Paulin
- Tourism Haut-Saint-Maurice, La Tuque

=== Access to the Region ===
The area can be accessed by air, non-commercial, per passenger buses, 13 Orléans Express posts, car, highway 40, 55 and roads 138, 153, 155, 157, 159 and by train, Via Rail Canada: La Tuque station and Shawinigan Station.

=== Persons with limited physical abilities ===
Number of establishments	access
7	Total
68	Partial
21	Services for People with a hearing impairment
6	Services for people with a visual impairment

== Tourism awards ==
- "Great Tourism Awards 2013". Archived from the original on 2014-03-05.
- "Great Tourism Awards 2012". Archived from the original on 2013-11-10.
- "Great Tourism Awards 2011".
- "Great Tourism Awards 2010".
- "Great Tourism Awards 2009".
- "Great Tourism Awards 2008".

== See also ==
=== Related article ===
- Mauricie
- Trois-Rivières
- Shawinigan
- La Tuque
- La Mauricie National Park
- Batiscan River Park
- La Mauricie National Park
- La Cité de l'Énergie, Shawinigan thematic park

=== Bibliography ===
- Appartenance Mauricie, Le tourisme en Mauricie : une histoire qui voyage (Tourism in Mauricie: a story that travel), Calendar 2010, Shawinigan, Appartenance Mauricie Société d’histoire régionale (Belonging to Mauricie - Regional Historial Society), 2009. PDF version available on web site of "Appartenance Mauricie"(in French)

=== External links ===
- Bonjour Quebec
- Tourisme Mauricie
- Tourism in Trois-Rivières
- Association de mototourisme de la Mauricie (Mototourism Association of Mauricie)(in French)
- Touristic guide of La Mauricie (in French)
- La Mauricie National Park
