= Centre de services scolaire de l'Énergie =

The Centre de services scolaire de l'Énergie is a francophone school service centre in the Mauricie region of Quebec, headquartered in Shawinigan.

The territory served is divide in 5 districts:

1. District Shawinigan-Grand-Mère
2. District Maskinongé.
3. District Mékinac
4. District Shawinigan-Sud-Mont-Carmel
5. District La Tuque

This includes 22 municipalities, three First Nations reserves, and four non-organized territories.

== Schools ==
=== Primary and secondary ===
- École des Boisés (Saint-Alexis-des-Monts)
- École Notre-Dame-de-l'Assomption (Parent sector of La Tuque)

=== Secondary ===
- École secondaire Champagnat (La Tuque)
- École secondaire des Chutes (Shawinigan)
- École secondaire du Rocher (Shawinigan)
- École secondaire Paul-Le Jeune (Saint-Tite)
- École secondaire Val-Mauricie (Shawinigan)

=== Preschool and Primary ===
- Antoine-Hallé (Shawinigan)
- Centrale (La Tuque)
- de l'Énergie (Shawinigan)
- de la Passerelle (Notre-Dame-de-Montauban)
- de la Petite-Rivière (Shawinigan)
- de la Source (Shawinigan)
- de la Tortue-des-Bois (Saint-Mathieu-du-Parc)
- de Sainte-Flore (Shawinigan)
- des Bâtisseurs (Shawinigan)
- des Explorateurs (Shawinigan)
- des Vallons (Saint-Paulin)
- Dominique-Savio (Shawinigan)
- Félix-Leclerc (Shawinigan)
- Immaculée-Conception (Shawinigan)
- Jacques-Buteux (La Tuque)
- Jacques-Cartier (Shawinigan)
- Jacques-Plante (Shawinigan)
- La Croisière (Saint-Séverin)
- La Providence (Saint-Tite)
- Laflèche (Shawinigan)
- Le Sablon d'Or (Lac-aux-Sables)
- Masson (Sainte-Thècle)
- Notre-Dame (Shawinigan)
- Notre-Dame (Notre-Dame-du-Mont-Carmel)
- Notre-Dame Preschool (Shawinigan)
- Notre-Dame-de-la-Joie (Saint-Barnabé Nord)
- Notre-Dame-des-Neiges (Charette)
- Plein Soleil (Hérouxville)
- Primadel (Saint-Adelphe)
- Saint-Charles-Garnier (Shawinigan)
- Sainte-Marie (Saint-Boniface)
- Saint-Jacques (Shawinigan)
- Saint-Joseph (Shawinigan)
- Saint-Paul (Shawinigan)
- Villa-de-la-Jeunesse (Saint-Élie-de-Caxton)
