= Quebec Route 153 =

Highway in Quebec, Canada

Route 153

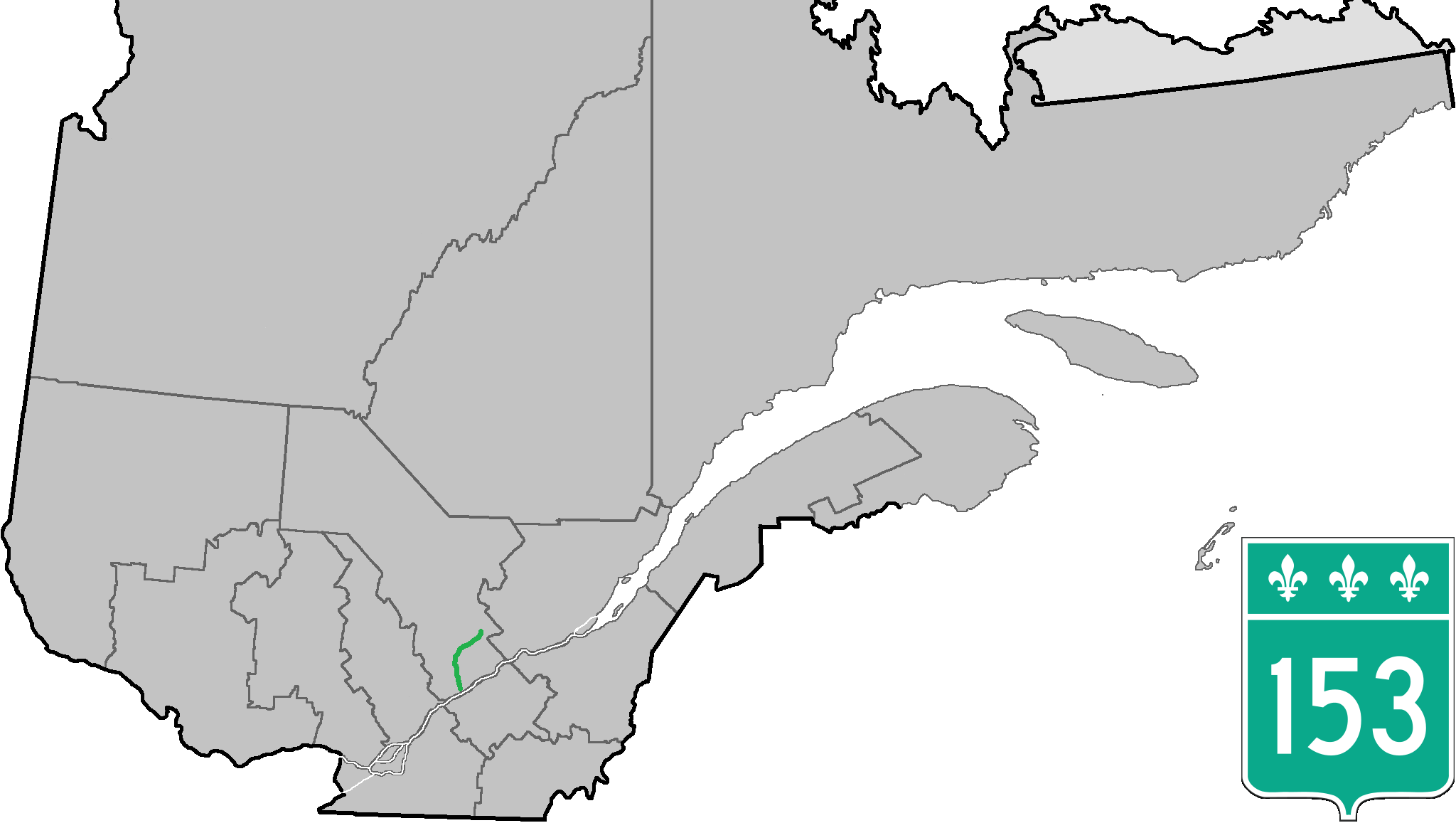

Route information
- Maintained by Transports Québec
- Length: 94.6 km (58.8 mi)

Major junctions
- South end: A-40 in Yamachiche
- R-138 in Yamachiche; R-351 in Saint-Barnabé; A-55 / R-155 / R-350 in Saint-Boniface-de-Shawinigan; A-55 / R-155 / R-157 / R-351 in Shawinigan; A-55 / R-155 in Grand-Mère (Shawinigan); R-359 in Saint-Georges-de-Champlain (Shawinigan); R-159 in Saint-Tite; R-352 in Sainte-Thècle
- North end: R-363 in Lac-aux-Sables

Location
- Country: Canada
- Province: Quebec

Highway system
- Quebec provincial highways; Autoroutes; List; Former
← R-148	→ R-155

Route 153 is a two-lane north–south highway in Quebec, Canada, which starts in Yamachiche at the junction of Autoroute 40 and ends in Lac-aux-Sables at the junction of Route 363.

== Municipalities along Route 153 ==
- Yamachiche
- Saint-Barnabé
- Saint-Boniface-de-Shawinigan
- Shawinigan - (Shawinigan / Grand-Mère / Saint-Georges-de-Champlain)
- Hérouxville
- Saint-Tite
- Sainte-Thècle
- Lac-aux-Sables

== Major intersections ==
RCM or ET	Municipality	Km	Junction	Notes
Southern terminus of Route 153
Maskinongé	Yamachiche	0.0; 0.4	A-40 (Exit 180)	40 WEST: to Louiseville; 40 EAST: to Pointe-du-Lac (Trois-Rivières)
Maskinongé	Yamachiche	2.4	R-138	138 WEST: to Louiseville; 138 EAST: to Pointe-du-Lac (Trois-Rivières)
Maskinongé	Yamachiche	5.7	Route de Saint-Sévère	NORTH: to Saint-Sévère
Maskinongé	Saint-Barnabé	18.5	Chemin de la Grande-Rivière	EAST: to Saint-Étienne-des-Grès
Maskinongé	Saint-Barnabé	19.5	R-351 (South end)	351 NORTH: to Charette
Maskinongé	Saint-Boniface	28.7	R-350 (East end)	350 WEST: to Charette
Maskinongé	Saint-Boniface	37.1	A-55 / R-155	55 SOUTH/155 SOUTH: to Saint-Étienne-des-Grès
Maskinongé	Saint-Boniface	37.6	A-55 / R-155	55 NORTH/155 NORTH: to Shawinigan
Shawinigan	Shawinigan	41.9	R-157 (North end)	157 SOUTH: to Shawinigan-Sud (Shawinigan)
Shawinigan	Shawinigan	43.0	R-351 (North end)	351 SOUTH: to Saint-Gérard-des-Laurentides (Shawinigan)
Shawinigan	Shawinigan	55.5	R-359 (North end)	359 SOUTH: to Lac-a-la-Tortue (Shawinigan)
Shawinigan	Shawinigan	57.8	90e Avenue	WEST: to R-155
Mékinac	Saint-Tite	70.1; 70.9	R-159 (Overlap 0.8 km)	159 NORTH: to Saint-Roch-de-Mékinac; 159 SOUTH: to Saint-Séverin
Mékinac	Sainte-Thècle	82.3	R-352 (East end)	352 WEST: to Saint-Adelphe
Mékinac	Lac-aux-Sables	94.6	R-363	363 SOUTH: to Notre-Dame-de-Montauban
Northern terminus of Route 153

== See also ==
- List of Quebec provincial highways
