= Quebec Route 349 =

Highway in Quebec, Canada

Route 349

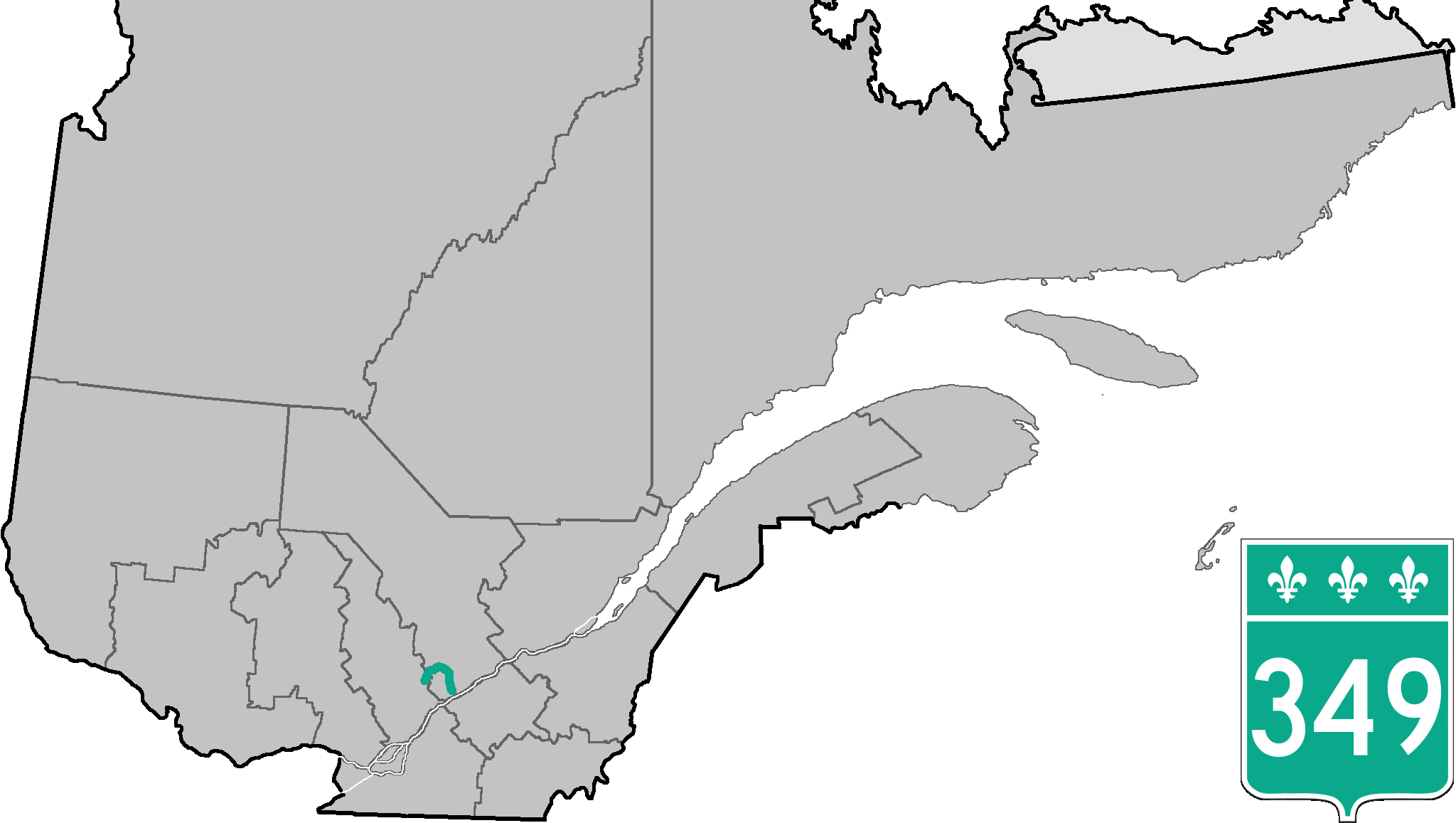

Route information
- Maintained by Ministère des transports du Québec, Municipalité de la paroisse de Saint-Alexis-des-Monts and Municipalité de la paroisse de Saint-Didace
- Length: 59.7 km (37.1 mi)

Major junctions
- North end: R-348 in Saint-Didace
- South end: R-138 in Louiseville

Location
- Country: Canada
- Province: Quebec
- Major cities: Louiseville, Saint-Paulin

Highway system
- Quebec provincial highways; Autoroutes; List; Former
← R-348	→ R-350

Route 349 is a provincial highway located in the Mauricie region of Quebec. It runs from the junction of Route 138 in Louiseville to Saint-Didace at the junction with Route 348. In Saint-Paulin it overlaps Route 350.

== Towns located along Route 349 ==
- Saint-Didace
- Saint-Alexis-des-Monts
- Sainte-Angèle-de-Prémont
- Saint-Paulin
- Saint-Léon-le-Grand
- Louiseville

== Major intersections ==
RCM or ET	Municipality	Km	Road	Notes
Maskinongé	Louiseville	0.0	R-138	
Maskinongé	Saint-Léon-le-Grand	6.7	Rue de la Fabrique	To Saint-Léon-le-Grand
Maskinongé	Saint-Paulin	18.0	R-350	Southern terminus of Route 349 / Route 350 overlap
Maskinongé	Saint-Paulin	21.3	R-350 / Rue Laflèche	Southern terminus of Route 349 / Route 350 overlap Rue Lafleche to Hunterstown
Maskinongé	Saint-Alexis-des-Monts	36.2	Rue Notre-Dame	To Saint-Alexis-des-Monts
D'Autray	Saint-Didace	59.7	R-348	

== See also ==
- List of Quebec provincial highways
