= Quebec Route 351 =

Highway in Quebec, Canada

Route 351

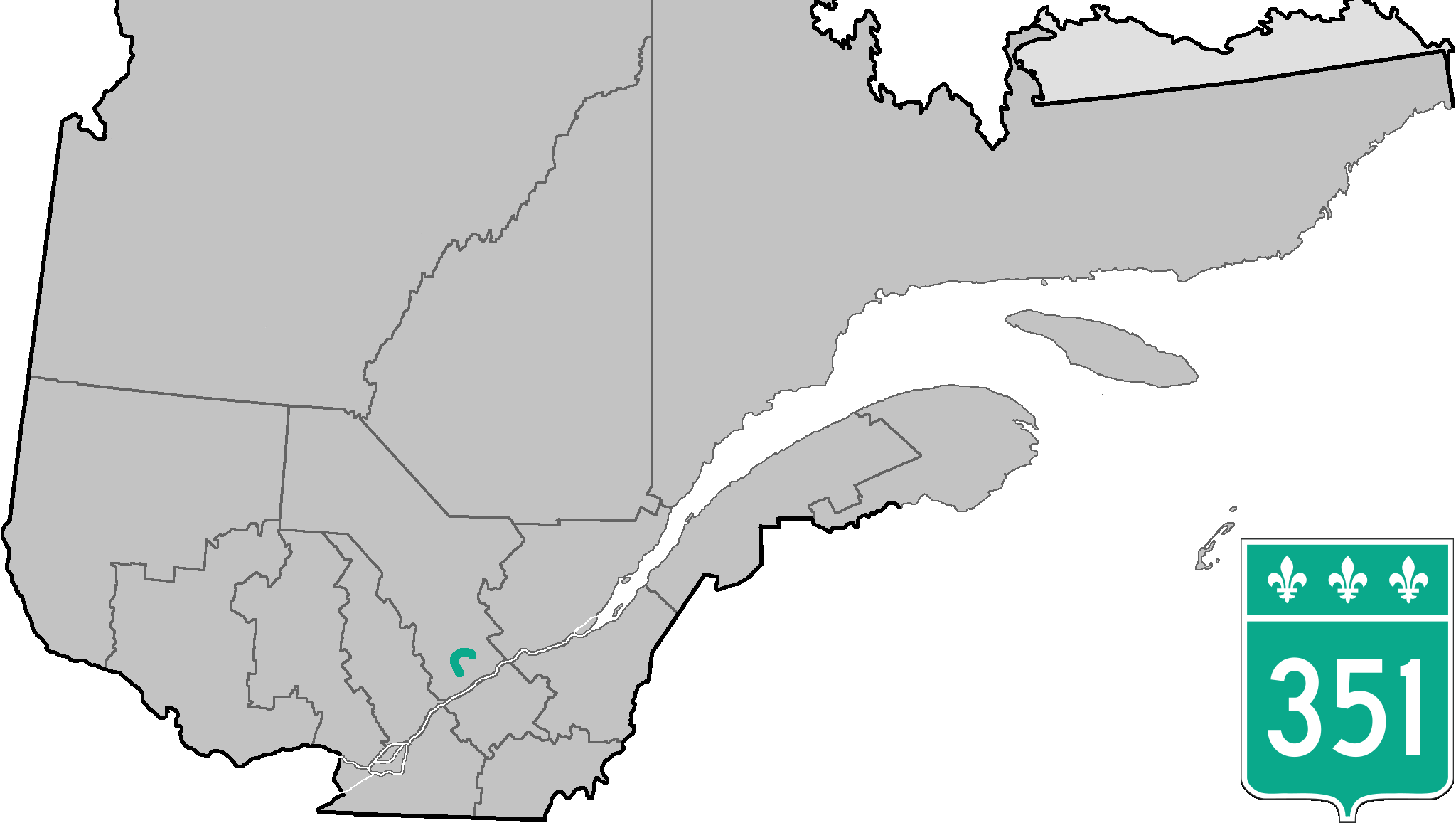

Route information
- Maintained by Ministère des transports, Municipalités de Saint-Élie and Saint-Mathieu-du-Parc
- Length: 43.2 km (26.8 mi)

Major junctions
- North end: R-153 in Shawinigan
- A-55 in Shawinigan
- South end: R-153 in Saint-Barnabé

Location
- Country: Canada
- Province: Quebec
- Major cities: Shawinigan

Highway system
- Quebec provincial highways; Autoroutes; List; Former
← R-350	→ R-352

Route 351 is a Quebec provincial highway located in the Mauricie region. It runs from the junction of Route 153 in Saint-Barnabé and ends in Shawinigan also at a junction with Route 153 just south of the Autoroute 55 and Route 155 interchange. It also has a concurrency in Charette with Route 350.

== Municipalities located along Route 351 ==
- Saint-Barnabé
- Charette
- Saint-Élie
- Saint-Mathieu-du-Parc
- Shawinigan

== Major intersections ==
RCM or ET	Municipality	Km	Junction	Notes
Southern terminus of Route 351
Maskinongé	Saint-Barnabé	0.0	R-153	
Maskinongé	Charette	4.8	R-350	Southern terminus of Route 350 / Route 351 overlap
Maskinongé	Charette	6.4	R-350	Northern terminus of Route 350 / Route 351 overlap
Shawinigan	Shawinigan	43.5	A-55	Exit 217 (A-55)
Shawinigan	Shawinigan	43.2	R-153	
Northern terminus of Route 351

== See also ==
- List of Quebec provincial highways
