= Sainte-Ursule =

- Municipality
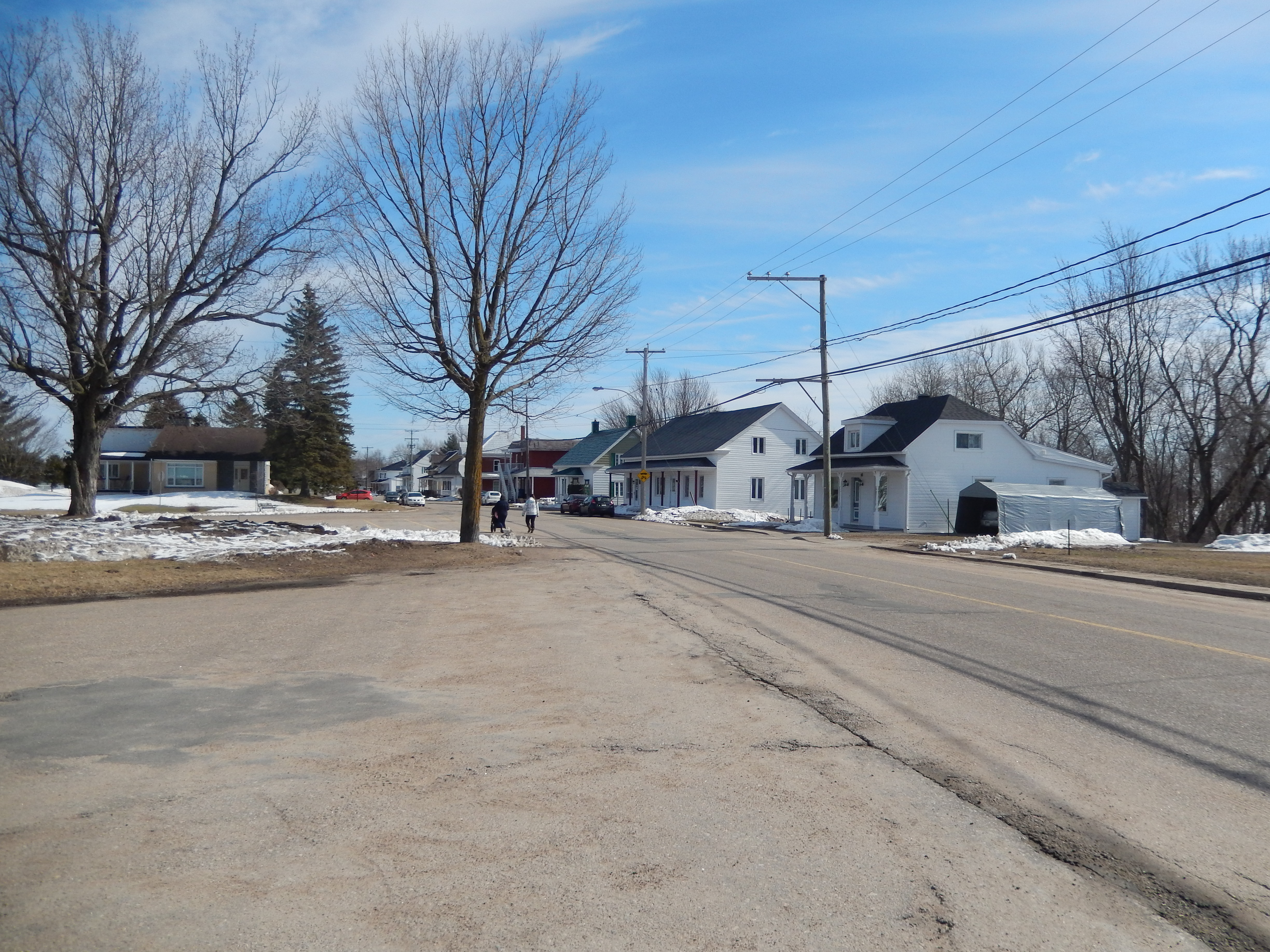

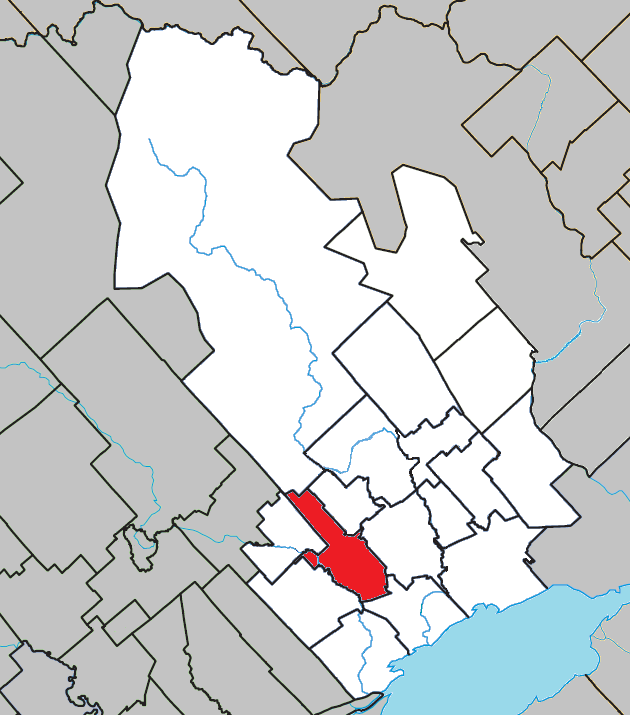
- Location within Maskinongé RCM

- Location in central Quebec
- Coordinates: 46°17′N 73°02′W
- Country: Canada
- Province: Quebec
- Region: Mauricie
- RCM: Maskinongé
- Settled: 1836
- Constituted: July 1, 1855

Government
  - Mayor: Réjean Carle
  - Fed. riding: Berthier—Maskinongé
  - Prov. riding: Maskinongé

Area
  - Total: 68.35 km^{2} (26.39 sq mi)
  - Land: 67.83 km^{2} (26.19 sq mi)

Population (2021)
  - Total: 1,355
  - Density: 20/km^{2} (52/sq mi)
  - Change 2016-21: ▲1.9%
  - Dwellings: 722
- Time zone: UTC−5 (EST)
  - Summer (DST): UTC−4 (EDT)
- Postal code(s): J0K 3M0
- Area code(s): 819
- Highways: R-348 R-350
- Website: www.sainte-ursule.ca

Sainte-Ursule (French pronunciation: [sɛ̃t yʁsyl]) is a municipality in the Mauricie region of the province of Quebec, Canada.

== History ==
In 1836, the Parish of Sainte-Ursule was formed, named after the Ursuline nuns of Trois-Rivières. Circa 1840, settlers arrived along on the east bank of the Petite Rivière du Loup (Little Wolf River) and along the Ruisseau des Bélanger (Bélanger Creek). In 1845, the Parish Municipality of Sainte-Ursule was created, abolished two years later, and reestablished in 1855. In 1851, its post office opened.

In 1917, Sainte-Ursule lost a portion of its territory to the then newly-created Parish Municipality of Sainte-Angèle, and again in 1950, to the then newly-created Municipality of Saint-Édouard.

In 2018, the status of parish municipality was changed to that of (regular) municipality.

== Demographics ==
Historical census populations – Sainte-Ursule

Year	Pop.	±%
1871	2,322	—
1881	2,390	+2.9%
1891	2,490	+4.2%
1901	2,105	−15.5%
1911	2,075	−1.4%
1921	1,487	−28.3%
1931	1,478	−0.6%
1941	1,700	+15.0%

Year	Pop.	±%
1951	1,514	−10.9%
1956	1,574	+4.0%
1961	1,549	−1.6%
1966	1,475	−4.8%
1971	1,416	−4.0%
1976	1,299	−8.3%
1981	1,319	+1.5%
1986	1,328	+0.7%

Year	Pop.	±%
1991	1,408	+6.0%
1996	1,431	+1.6%
2001	1,462	+2.2%
2006	1,419	−2.9%
2011	1,375	−3.1%
2016	1,330	−3.3%
2021	1,355	+1.9%

Population counts are not adjusted for boundary changes.
Source: Statistics Canada
