= Ministry of Tourism (Quebec) =

The Ministry of Tourism (in French: Ministère du Tourisme) is a Ministry of the Government of Quebec responsible for promoting tourism in the province of Quebec.

The current minister is Amélie Dionne.

Its responsibilities include promoting Quebec and its tourism regions, developing and implementing tourism strategies and programs, providing visitor information and reception services, and producing and disseminating strategic knowledge about tourism. The ministry's mandate is intended to support the sustainable development and economic prosperity of Quebec's regions.

The ministry works closely with 21 regional tourism associations (associations touristiques régionales, like ATR Mauricie and ATR Montreal), which it recognizes as its principal regional partners for the development of the tourism industry throughout Quebec. The ATRs are responsible for functions delegated by the ministry, including tourism promotion and marketing, visitor reception and information, signage, and the development and structuring of the regional tourism offering. They also participate in initiatives concerning sustainable and responsible tourism, innovation, digital transformation, workforce development and strategic knowledge.

The ministry also works with sectoral tourism associations and the Alliance de l'industrie touristique du Québec. The sectoral associations provide leadership and coordination within specific tourism sectors and are recognized as privileged partners of the ministry, while the Alliance represents tourism businesses and associations and acts as a government mandate holder, notably for the promotion and marketing of Quebec as a tourist destination.
