= Quebec Route 350 =

Highway in Quebec, Canada

Route 350

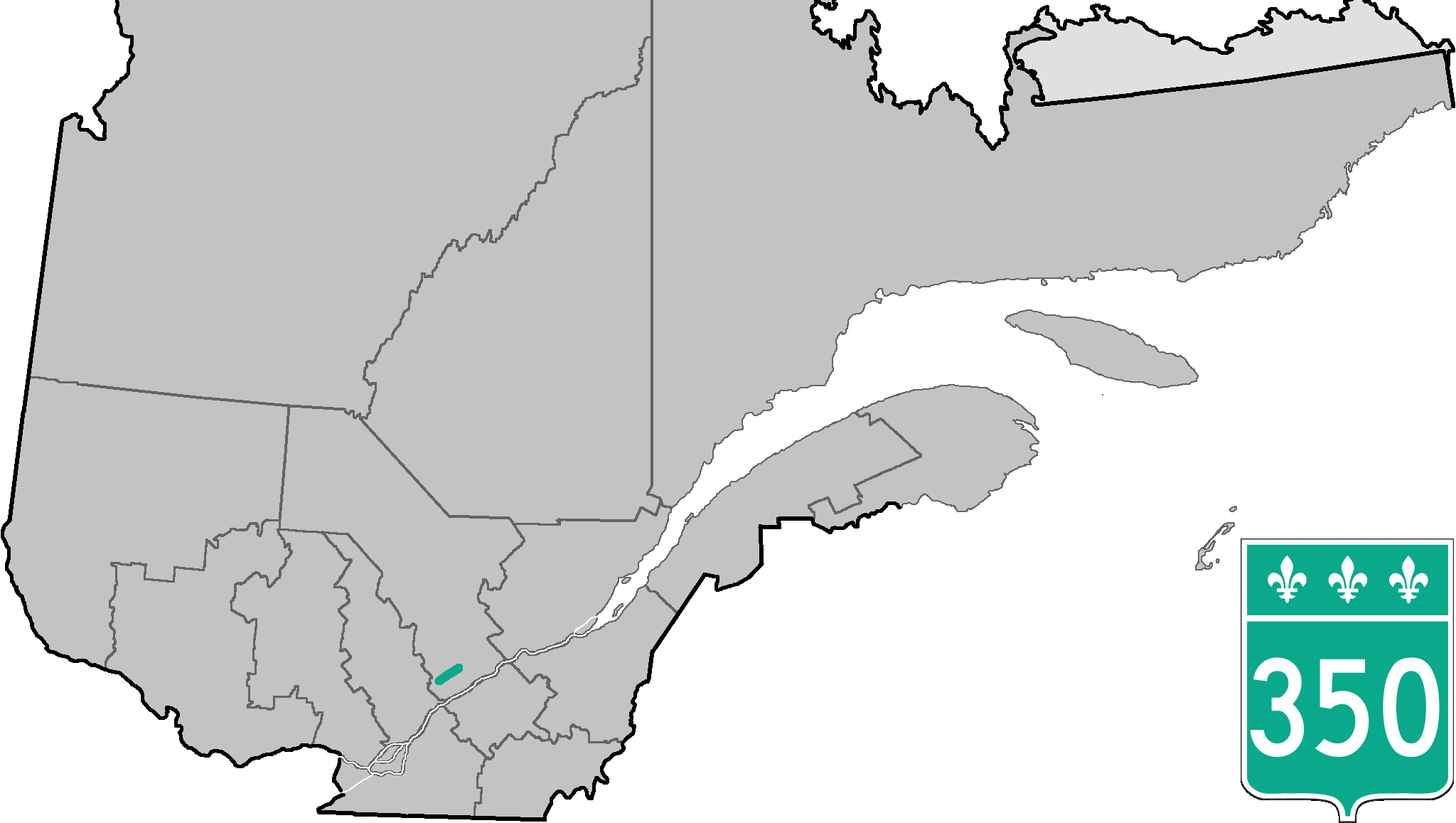

Route information
- Maintained by Ministère des transports du Québec
- Length: 28.3 km (17.6 mi)

Major junctions
- West end: R-348 in Saint-Édouard-de-Maskinongé
- East end: R-153 in Saint-Boniface

Location
- Country: Canada
- Province: Quebec
- Major cities: Saint-Edouard-de-Maskinonge, Saint-Boniface-de-Shawinigan, Saint-Paulin

Highway system
- Quebec provincial highways; Autoroutes; List; Former
← R-349	→ R-351

Route 350 is a provincial highway located in the Mauricie region of Quebec. It runs from the junction of Route 348 in Saint-Édouard-de-Maskinongé to the junction of Route 153 west of Saint-Boniface-de-Shawinigan. It overlaps Route 349 in Saint-Paulin and Route 351 in Charette.

== Towns along Route 350 ==
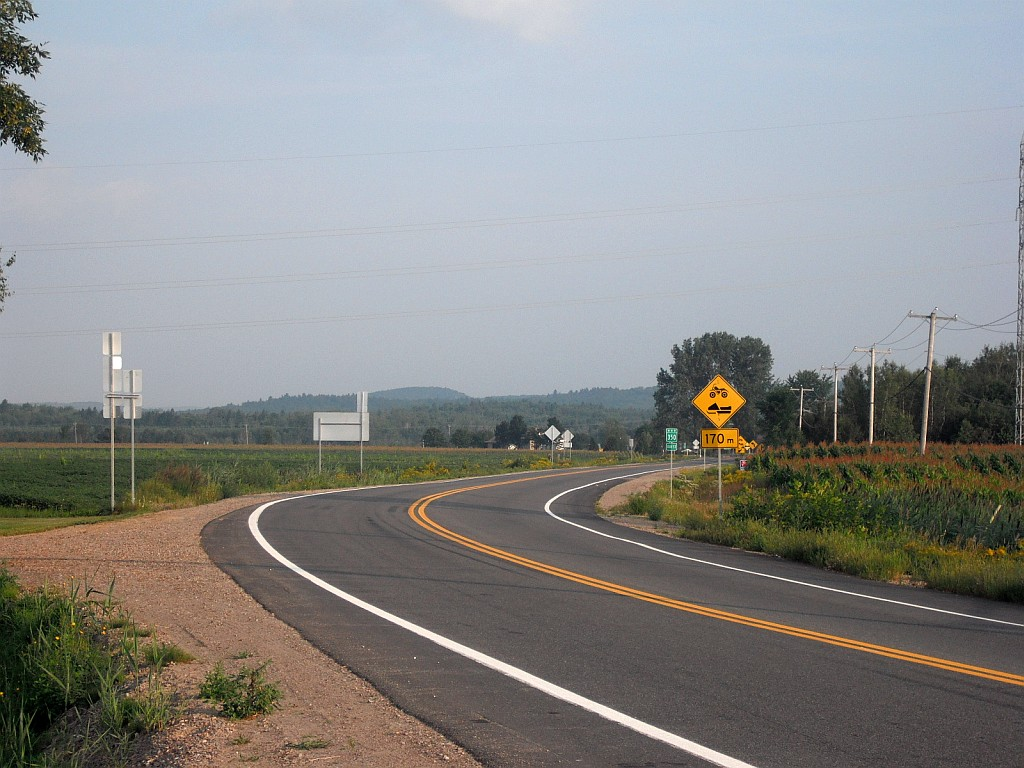
Quebec Route 350 in Saint-Boniface

- Saint-Édouard-de-Maskinongé
- Sainte-Ursule
- Sainte-Angèle-de-Prémont
- Saint-Paulin
- Charette
- Saint-Boniface

== Major intersections ==
RCM or ET	Municipality	Km	Junction	Notes
Western terminus of Route 350
Maskinongé	Saint-Édouard-de-Maskinongé	0.0	R-348	
Maskinongé	Saint-Paulin	10.7	R-349	Western terminus of Route 349 / Route 350 overlap
Maskinongé	Saint-Paulin	14.0	R-349 / Rue Lafèche	Eastern terminus of Route 349 / Route 350 overlap Rue Lafèche to Hunterstown
Maskinongé	Charette	22.2	R-351	Western terminus of Route 350 / Route 351 overlap
Maskinongé	Charette	23.9	R-351	Eastern terminus of Route 350 / Route 351 overlap
Maskinongé	Saint-Boniface	28.9	R-153	
Eastern terminus of Route 350

== See also ==
- List of Quebec provincial highways
