= Saint-Barnabé, Quebec =

Saint-Barnabé
- Parish municipality
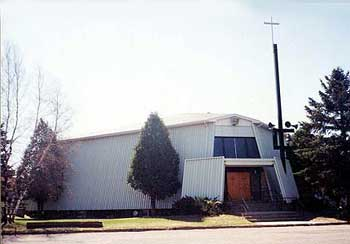

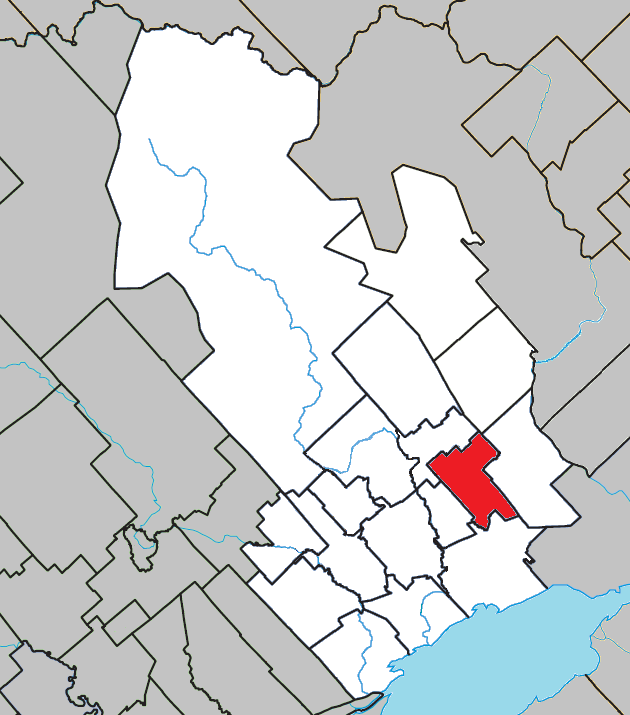
- Location within Maskinongé RCM

- Location in central Quebec
- Coordinates: 46°24′N 72°53′W
- Country: Canada
- Province: Quebec
- Region: Mauricie
- RCM: Maskinongé
- Constituted: July 1, 1855

Government
  - Mayor: Luc Bourassa
  - Fed. riding: Berthier—Maskinongé
  - Prov. riding: Maskinongé

Area
  - Total: 59.28 km^{2} (22.89 sq mi)
  - Land: 58.94 km^{2} (22.76 sq mi)

Population (2021)
  - Total: 1,186
  - Density: 20.1/km^{2} (52/sq mi)
  - Change 2016-21: ▼0.8%
  - Dwellings: 562
- Time zone: UTC−5 (EST)
  - Summer (DST): UTC−4 (EDT)
- Postal code(s): G0X 2K0
- Area code(s): 819
- Highways: R-153 R-351
- Website: www.saint-barnabe.ca

Saint-Barnabé (French pronunciation: [sɛ̃ baʁnabe]), formerly also known as Saint-Barnabé-de-Gastineau and Saint-Barnabé-Nord, is a parish municipality in the Mauricie region of the province of Quebec in Canada.

== Demographics ==
In the 2021 Census of Population conducted by Statistics Canada, Saint-Barnabé had a population of 1,186 living in 535 of its 562 total private dwellings, a change of −0.8% from its 2016 population of 1,196. With a land area of 58.94 km^{2} (22.76 sq mi), it had a population density of 20.1/km^{2} (52.1/sq mi) in 2021.

Historical census populations – Saint-Barnabé, Quebec

Year	Pop.	±%
1871	1,639	—
1881	1,976	+20.6%
1891	2,014	+1.9%
1901	2,291	+13.8%
1911	2,501	+9.2%
1921	1,419	−43.3%
1931	1,384	−2.5%
1941	1,384	+0.0%

Year	Pop.	±%
1951	1,256	−9.2%
1956	1,278	+1.8%
1961	1,319	+3.2%
1966	1,330	+0.8%
1971	1,230	−7.5%
1976	1,251	+1.7%
1981	1,282	+2.5%
1986	1,261	−1.6%

Year	Pop.	±%
1991	1,257	−0.3%
1996	1,284	+2.1%
2001	1,243	−3.2%
2006	1,207	−2.9%
2011	1,179	−2.3%
2016	1,196	+1.4%
2021	1,186	−0.8%

Population counts are not adjusted for boundary changes.
Source: Statistics Canada

== Government ==
The mayor is the municipality's highest elected official. Saint-Barnabé has had more than fifty mayors.

List of former mayors:

1. Antoine Bournival (1855–1858, 1860–1862)
2. Raphaël Bourassa (1858–1860)
3. Alexis Gélinas (1860–1860)
4. Thomas Gélinas (1862–1866)
5. Antoine Gauthier (1866–1872)
6. Jean-Baptiste Lemaître (1872–1874)
7. Dr Félix Dydime Fontaine (1874–1877)
8. Joseph Bellemare (1877–1880, 1881–1982)
9. Onésime Lesieur (1880–1881)
10. Arthur Sévère Bald (1882–1888)
11. Jules Lamy (1888–1890)
12. Octave Gélinas (1890–1892)
13. François Gélinas (1892–1893)
14. Évariste L. Désaulniers (1893–1894)
15. Louis Dollard Héroux (1894–1895)
16. Hormidas Garceau (1895–1897)
17. Maxime Grenier (1897–1898)
18. Élisée Bellemare (1898–1900)
19. Adolphe Lamy (1900–1901, 1902–1903)
20. Narcisse Gélinas (1901–1902)
21. Pierre Gélinas (1903–1905)
22. Jules Lamy (1903–1905)
23. Adélard Giguère (1905–1907)
24. Joseph de Charette (1907–1910)
25. Amédée Boucher (1910–1912)
26. Sinai Bournival (1912–1913)
27. Cléophas Bussière (1913–1915)
28. Adrien Gélinas (1915–1916)
29. Évariste Gélinas (1916–1917, 1921–1923)
30. Charles Marcouiller (1917–1920)
31. Odzaca Gélinas (1920–1921, 1935–1936)
32. Alexandre Désaulniers (1923–1925)
33. Nestor Bourassa (1925–1929)
34. Raoul Bellemare (1929–1931)
35. Wilfrid Boucher (1931–1933)
36. Sévère J. Lamy (1933–1935)
37. Caméric Lemay (1936–1937)
38. Oscar Lemay (1937–1939)
39. Origène Bourassa (1939–1943)
40. Albé Diamond (1943–1945)
41. Gérard Gélinas (1945–1957)
42. Bérard Pellerin (1957–1963)
43. Robert Lemay (1963–1969)
44. Nathan Diamond (1969–1981)
45. René Gélinas (1981–1990)
46. Jean-Guy Gélinas (1990–1994)
47. Nicole D. Gélinas (1994–1995)
48. Julien Plouffe (1995–2002)
49. Germain Lacombe (2002–2005)
50. Michel Lemay (2005–2009, 2013–2021)
51. René Bourassa (2009–2013)
52. Guillaume Laverdière (2021–2025)
53. Luc Bourassa (2025–current)

Officially, municipal elections in Saint-Barnabé are on a non-partisan basis.
