= Saint-Didace =

- Parish municipality
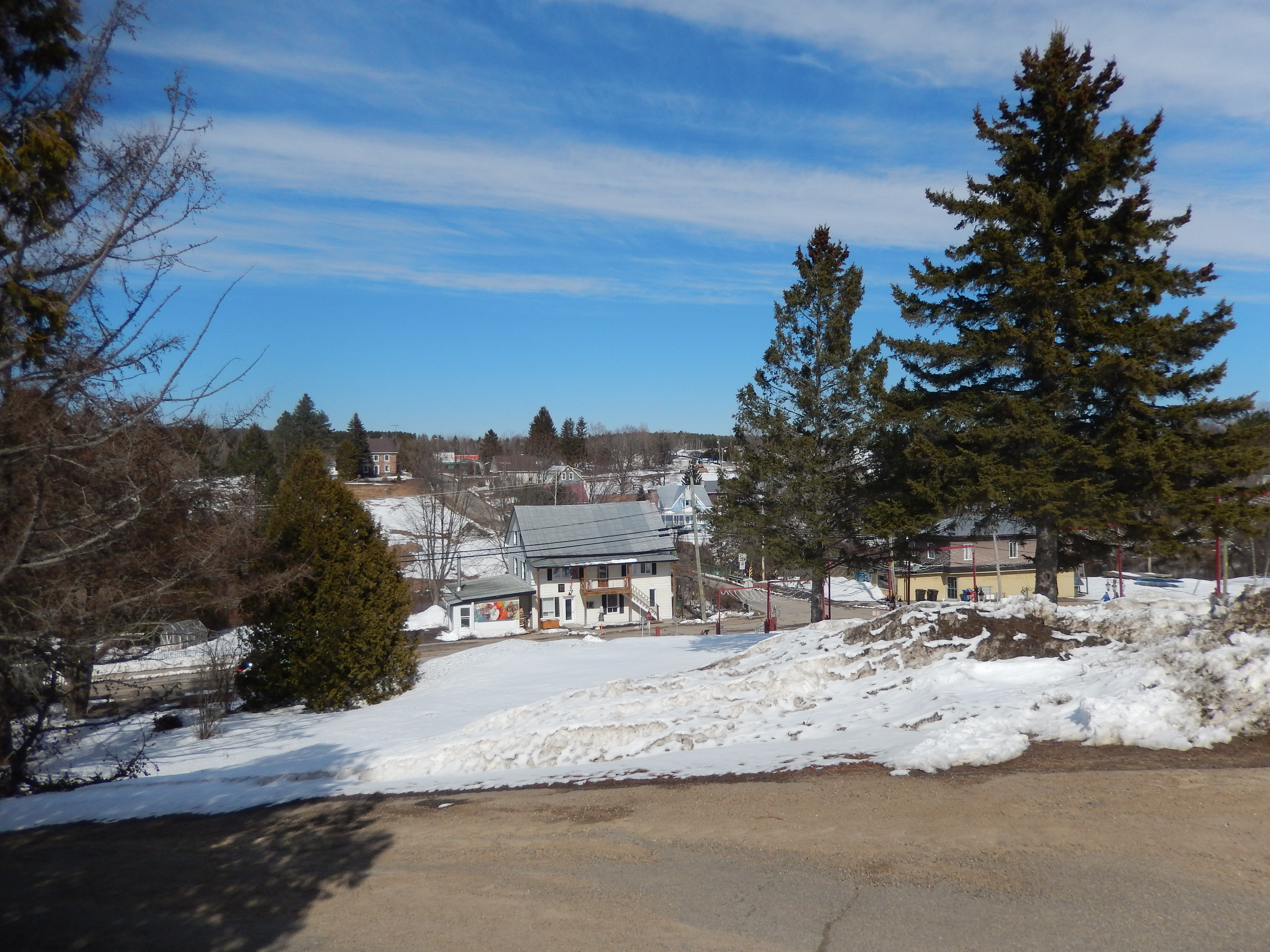

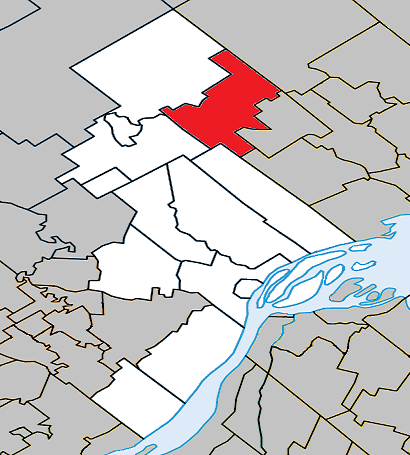
- Location within D'Autray RCM

- Location in central Quebec
- Coordinates: 46°20′N 73°17′W
- Country: Canada
- Province: Quebec
- Region: Lanaudière
- RCM: D'Autray
- Settled: 1820
- Constituted: August 27, 1863

Government
  - Mayor: Yves Germain
  - Fed. riding: Berthier—Maskinongé
  - Prov. riding: Berthier

Area
  - Total: 103.26 km^{2} (39.87 sq mi)
  - Land: 99.60 km^{2} (38.46 sq mi)

Population (2021)
  - Total: 688
  - Density: 6.9/km^{2} (18/sq mi)
  - Change 2016-21: ▲5.5%
  - Dwellings: 523
- Time zone: UTC−5 (EST)
  - Summer (DST): UTC−4 (EDT)
- Postal code(s): J0K 2G0
- Area codes: 450, 579
- Highways: R-348 R-349
- Website: saint-didace.com

Saint-Didace (French pronunciation: [sɛ̃ didas]) is a parish municipality in the D'Autray Regional County Municipality in the Lanaudière region of Quebec, Canada.

== Demographics ==
In the 2021 Census of Population conducted by Statistics Canada, Saint-Didace had a population of 688 living in 357 of its 523 total private dwellings, a change of 5.5% from its 2016 population of 652. With a land area of 99.6 km^{2} (38.5 sq mi), it had a population density of 6.9/km^{2} (17.9/sq mi) in 2021.

Historical census populations – Saint-Didace

Year	Pop.	±%
1871	2,055	—
1881	2,403	+16.9%
1891	1,954	−18.7%
1901	1,499	−23.3%
1911	1,463	−2.4%
1921	1,050	−28.2%
1931	1,046	−0.4%
1941	1,122	+7.3%

Year	Pop.	±%
1951	794	−29.2%
1956	704	−11.3%
1961	595	−15.5%
1966	575	−3.4%
1971	506	−12.0%
1976	479	−5.3%
1981	512	+6.9%
1986	521	+1.8%

Year	Pop.	±%
1991	576	+10.6%
1996	583	+1.2%
2001	589	+1.0%
2006	668	+13.4%
2011	593	−11.2%
2016	652	+9.9%
2021	688	+5.5%

Source: Statistics Canada

Mother tongue (2021):

- English as first language: 0.7%
- French as first language: 97.8%
- English and French as first languages: 0.7%
- Other as first language: 1.5%

== Education ==
Commission scolaire des Samares operates Francophone schools:

- École Germain-Caron

== See also ==
- List of parish municipalities in Quebec
