= Saint-Sévère, Quebec =

Saint-Sévère
- Parish municipality
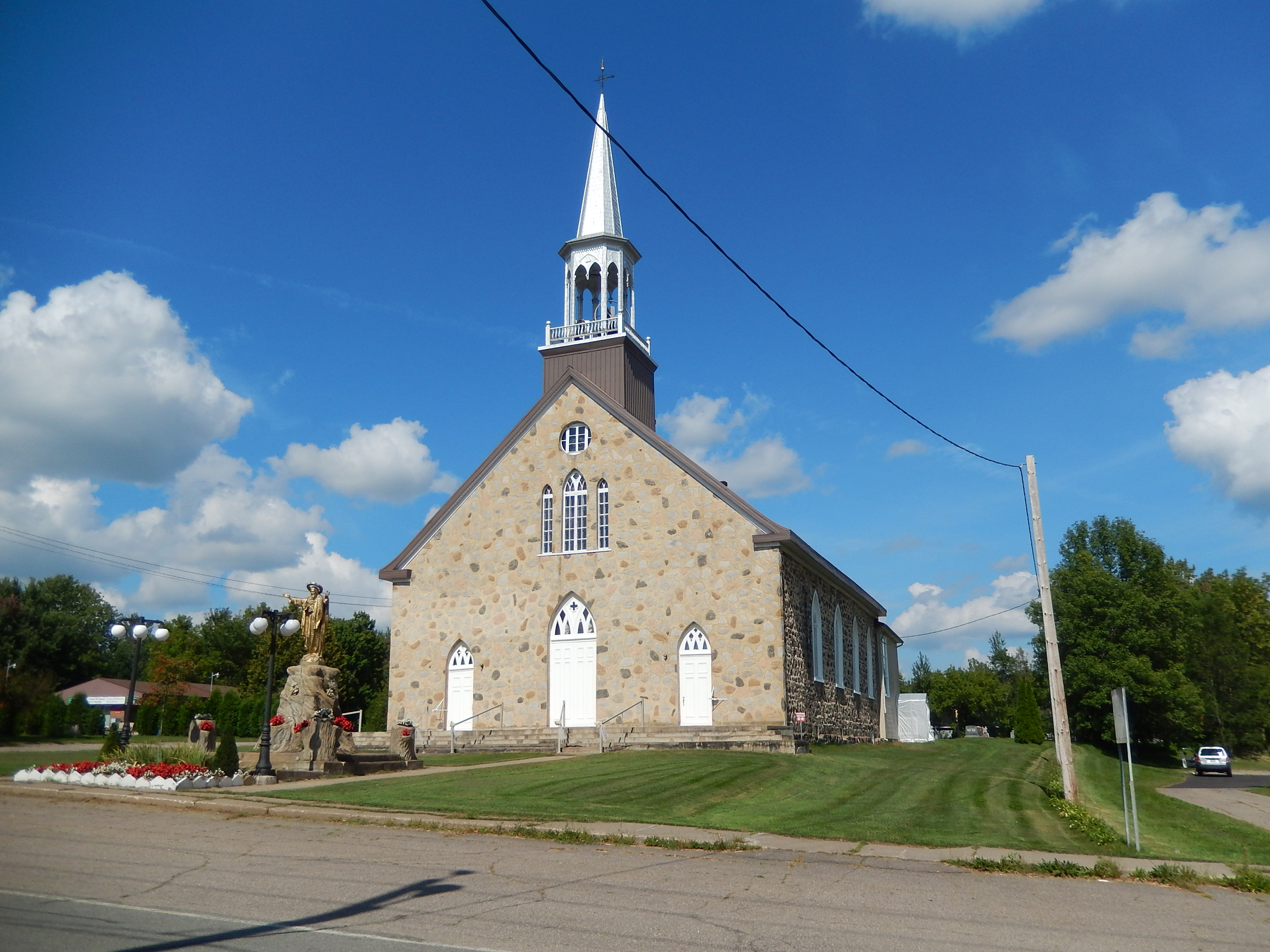

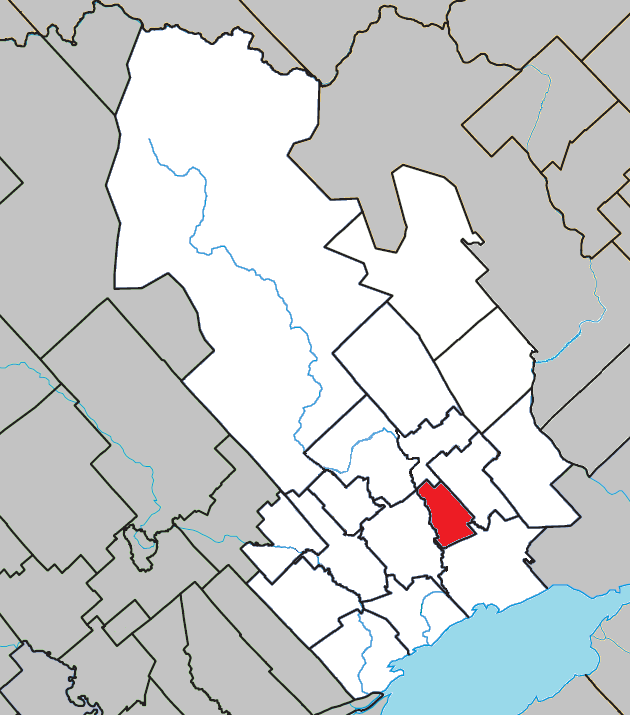
- Location within Maskinongé RCM

- Location in central Quebec
- Coordinates: 46°21′N 72°54′W
- Country: Canada
- Province: Quebec
- Region: Mauricie
- RCM: Maskinongé
- Constituted: July 1, 1855
- Named after: Joseph-Sévère-Nicolas Dumoulin

Government
  - Mayor: Jacinthe Noël
  - Fed. riding: Berthier—Maskinongé
  - Prov. riding: Maskinongé

Area
  - Total: 32.07 km^{2} (12.38 sq mi)
  - Land: 31.85 km^{2} (12.30 sq mi)

Population (2021)
  - Total: 337
  - Density: 10.6/km^{2} (27/sq mi)
  - Change 2016-21: ▲11.6%
  - Dwellings: 155
- Time zone: UTC−5 (EST)
  - Summer (DST): UTC−4 (EDT)
- Postal code(s): G0X 3B0
- Area code(s): 819
- Highways: No major routes
- Website: www.saint-severe.ca

Saint-Sévère (French pronunciation: [sɛ̃ sevɛʁ]) is a parish municipality in the Mauricie region of the province of Quebec, Canada.

== Demographics ==
In the 2021 Census of Population conducted by Statistics Canada, Saint-Sévère had a population of 337 living in 144 of its 155 total private dwellings, a change of 11.6% from its 2016 population of 302. With a land area of 31.85 km^{2} (12.30 sq mi), it had a population density of 10.6/km^{2} (27.4/sq mi) in 2021.

Historical census populations – Saint-Sévère, Quebec

Year	Pop.	±%
1871	822	—
1881	888	+8.0%
1891	972	+9.5%
1901	864	−11.1%
1911	895	+3.6%
1921	890	−0.6%
1931	716	−19.6%
1941	613	−14.4%

Year	Pop.	±%
1951	545	−11.1%
1956	540	−0.9%
1961	537	−0.6%
1966	495	−7.8%
1971	420	−15.2%
1976	406	−3.3%
1981	395	−2.7%
1986	367	−7.1%

Year	Pop.	±%
1991	367	+0.0%
1996	358	−2.5%
2001	337	−5.9%
2006	329	−2.4%
2011	318	−3.3%
2016	302	−5.0%
2021	337	+11.6%

Source: Statistics Canada
