= Saint-Paulin, Quebec =

Saint-Paulin
- Municipality
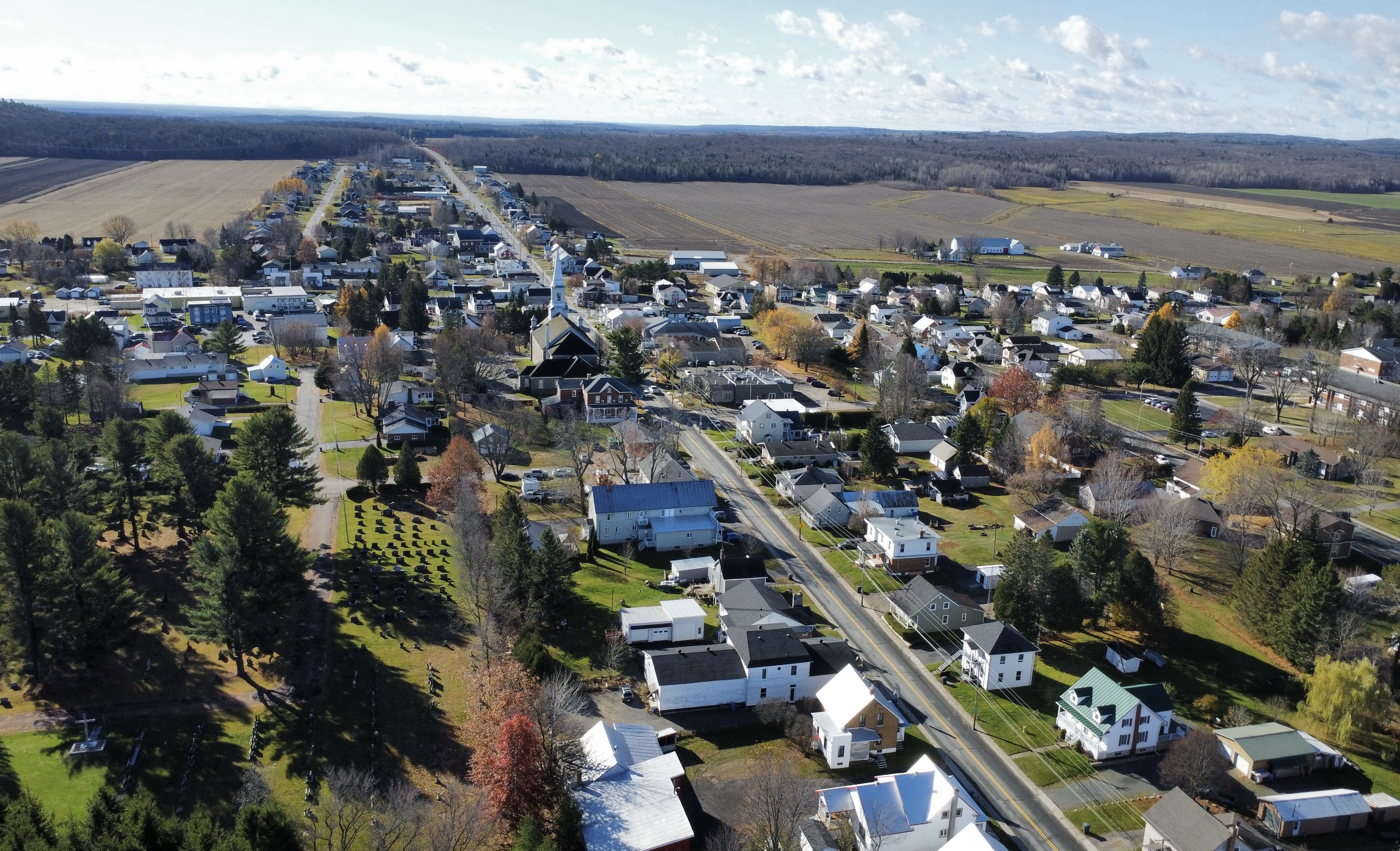
- Motto: Fierté et Amitié ("Pride and Friendship")
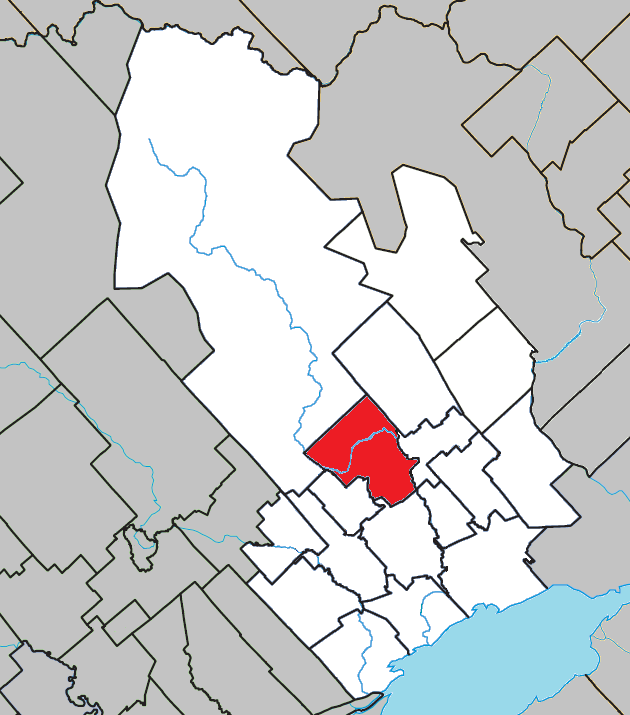
- Location within Maskinongé RCM

- Location in central Quebec
- Coordinates: 46°25′N 73°02′W
- Country: Canada
- Province: Quebec
- Region: Mauricie
- RCM: Maskinongé
- Settled: 1824
- Constituted: February 27, 1988

Government
  - Mayor: Martin Dupuis
  - Fed. riding: Berthier—Maskinongé
  - Prov. riding: Maskinongé

Area
  - Total: 98.25 km^{2} (37.93 sq mi)
  - Land: 95.41 km^{2} (36.84 sq mi)

Population (2021)
  - Total: 1,541
  - Density: 16.2/km^{2} (42/sq mi)
  - Pop (2016-21): ▲2.9%
  - Dwellings: 794
- Time zone: UTC−5 (EST)
  - Summer (DST): UTC−4 (EDT)
- Postal code(s): J0K 3G0
- Area code(s): 819
- Highways: R-349 R-350
- Website: saint-paulin.ca

Saint-Paulin (French pronunciation: [sɛ̃ polɛ̃]) is a municipality in the Mauricie region of the province of Quebec in Canada.

In addition to the namesake main population centre, the municipality also include the village of Hunterstown (46°26′47″N 73°0′58″W, named after Peter Hunter), and the hamlet of Renversy (46°23′50″N 73°0′55″W)

== History ==
Settlement began in 1824 with the construction of a sawmill in Hunterstown Township, that was already drawn up by 1795 on the Gale and Duberger map. In 1847, the parish of Saint-Paulin was formed when it split off from Saint-Léon-le-Grand. In 1855, the Parish Municipality of Saint-Paulin was established. In 1860, its post office opened. The village itself separated from the parish municipality in 1924 to form the Village Municipality of Saint-Paulin.

In 1988, the parish and village municipalities, together with the Township Municipality of Hunterstown (formed in 1861), merged to form the current Municipality of Saint-Paulin.

== Demographics ==
Historical census populations – Saint-Paulin, Quebec

Year	Pop.	±%
1986	1,615	—
1991	1,556	−3.7%
1996	1,599	+2.8%
2001	1,576	−1.4%

Year	Pop.	±%
2006	1,622	+2.9%
2011	1,534	−5.4%
2016	1,497	−2.4%
2021	1,541	+2.9%

Source: Statistics Canada

Private dwellings occupied by usual residents (2021): 717 (total dwellings: 794)

Mother tongue (2021):

- English as first language: 0.7%
- French as first language: 98.7%
- English and French as first language: 0.3%
- Other as first language: 0.3%

== Government ==
List of former mayors:

- Paul Boulanger (1988–1991, 1995–1999)
- Firmin St-Yves (1991)
- Jules Duhaime (1991–1995)
- Jacques Dupuis (1999)
- Marc-André Lessard (1999–2002)
- Brigitte Gagnon (2003–2013)
- Serge Dubé (2013–2020)
- Claude Frappier (2020–2025)
- Martin Dupuis (2025–present)
