= Saint-Léon-le-Grand, Mauricie =

Saint-Léon-le-Grand
- Parish municipality
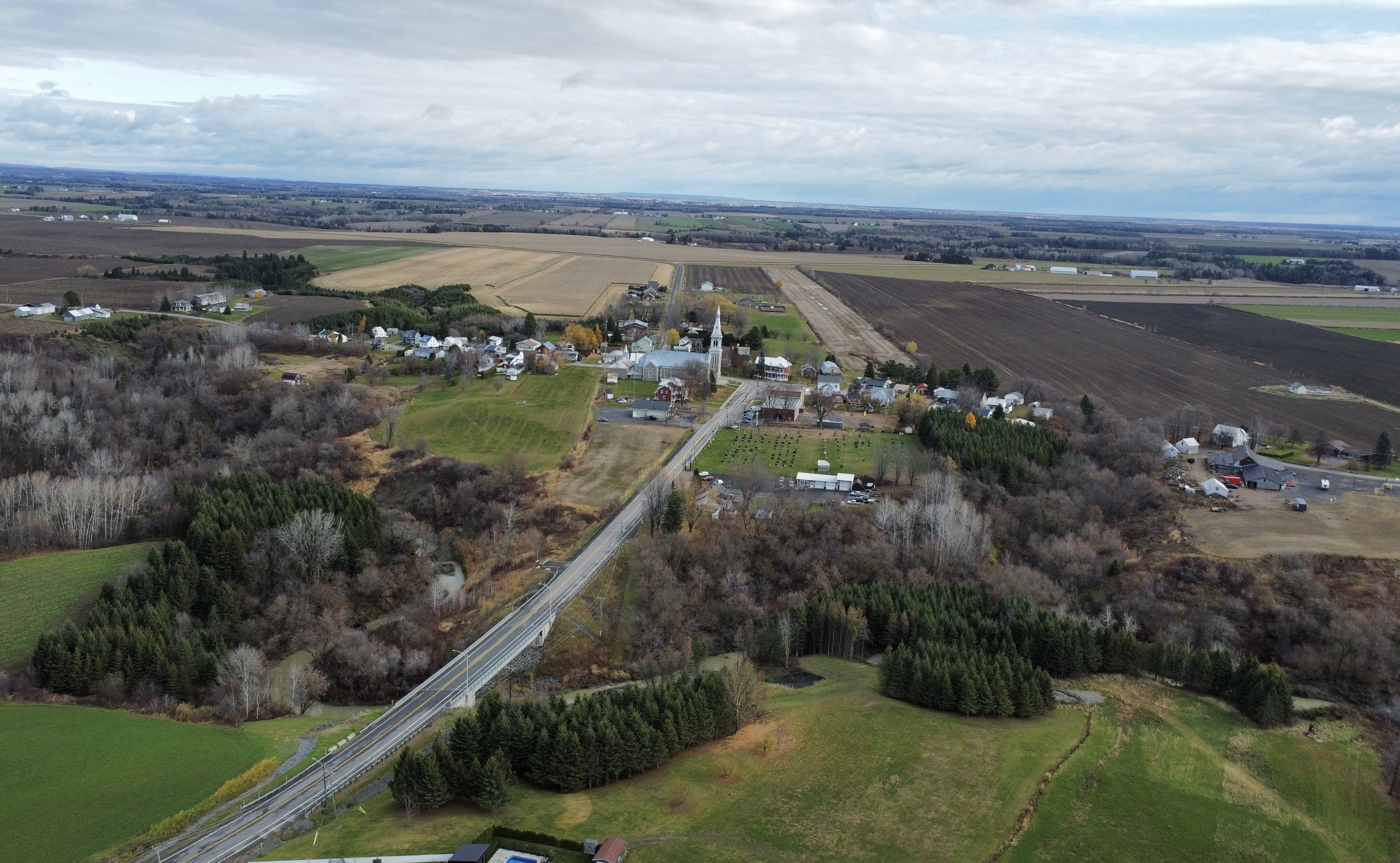

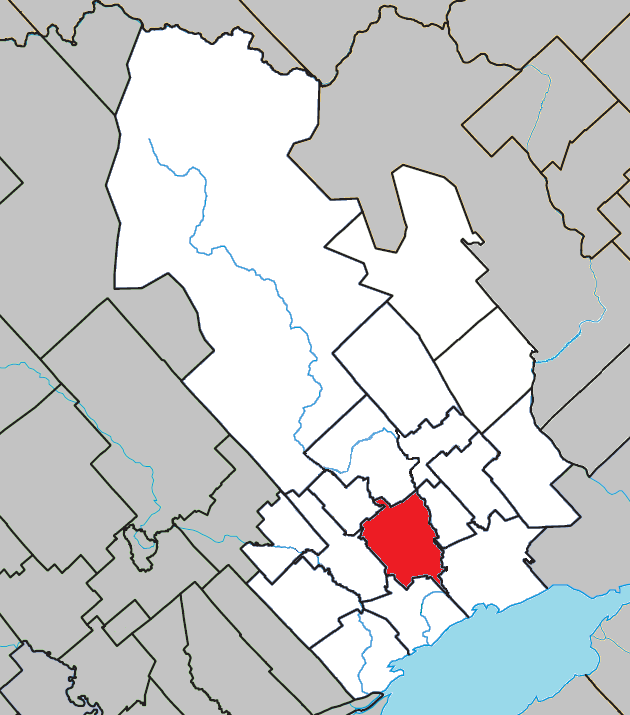
- Location within Maskinongé RCM

- Location in central Quebec
- Coordinates: 46°19′N 72°56′W
- Country: Canada
- Province: Quebec
- Region: Mauricie
- RCM: Maskinongé
- Settled: 1790s
- Constituted: July 1, 1855
- Named after: Pope Leo I

Government
  - Mayor: Christian Charette
  - Fed. riding: Berthier—Maskinongé
  - Prov. riding: Maskinongé

Area
  - Total: 75.7 km^{2} (29.2 sq mi)
  - Land: 75.97 km^{2} (29.33 sq mi)
- There is an apparent discrepancy between 2 authoritative sources.

Population (2021)
  - Total: 863
  - Density: 11.4/km^{2} (30/sq mi)
  - Change 2016-21: ▼7.0%
  - Dwellings: 393
- Time zone: UTC−5 (EST)
  - Summer (DST): UTC−4 (EDT)
- Postal code(s): J0K 2W0
- Area code(s): 819
- Highways: R-349
- Website: www.st-leon.com

Saint-Léon-le-Grand (French pronunciation: [sɛ̃ leɔ̃ lə ɡʁɑ̃]) is a parish municipality in the Maskinongé Regional County Municipality in the Mauricie region of the province of Quebec, Canada.

== History ==
In 1708, the area was granted as a seignory to François Dumontier (1666-1714), secretary of Philippe de Rigaud de Vaudreuil, with settlement beginning in the late 18th century. In 1797, a mission was founded, that became a parish in 1833. The parish was called Saint-Léon-le-Grand in honour of Pope Leo the Great, while the place was initially known as Saint-Léon-de-Dumontier.

In 1847, the Municipality of Dumontier was created, abolished in 1847, and reestablished as the Parish Municipality of Saint-Léon-le-Grand on July 1, 1855.

== Demographics ==
In the 2021 Census of Population conducted by Statistics Canada, Saint-Léon-le-Grand had a population of 863 living in 369 of its 393 total private dwellings, a change of −7% from its 2016 population of 928. With a land area of 75.97 km^{2} (29.33 sq mi), it had a population density of 11.4/km^{2} (29.4/sq mi) in 2021.

Historical census populations – Saint-Léon-le-Grand, Mauricie

Year	Pop.	±%
1871	1,801	—
1881	1,787	−0.8%
1891	1,875	+4.9%
1901	1,653	−11.8%
1911	1,593	−3.6%
1921	1,411	−11.4%
1931	1,271	−9.9%
1941	1,270	−0.1%

Year	Pop.	±%
1951	1,186	−6.6%
1956	1,129	−4.8%
1961	1,147	+1.6%
1966	1,083	−5.6%
1971	1,126	+4.0%
1976	1,095	−2.8%
1981	1,058	−3.4%
1986	932	−11.9%

Year	Pop.	±%
1991	925	−0.8%
1996	955	+3.2%
2001	966	+1.2%
2006	965	−0.1%
2011	992	+2.8%
2016	928	−6.5%
2021	863	−7.0%

Source: Statistics Canada

Mother tongue (2021):

- English as first language: 0.6%
- French as first language: 98.8%
- English and French as first languages: 0%
- Other as first language: 0.6%

== Government ==
List of former mayors:

- Roland Pelletier (...–2005)
- Robert Lalonde (2005–2021)
- Marilyne Gélinas (2021–2025)
- Christian Charette (2025–current)
