= Saint-Alexis-des-Monts =

- Parish municipality
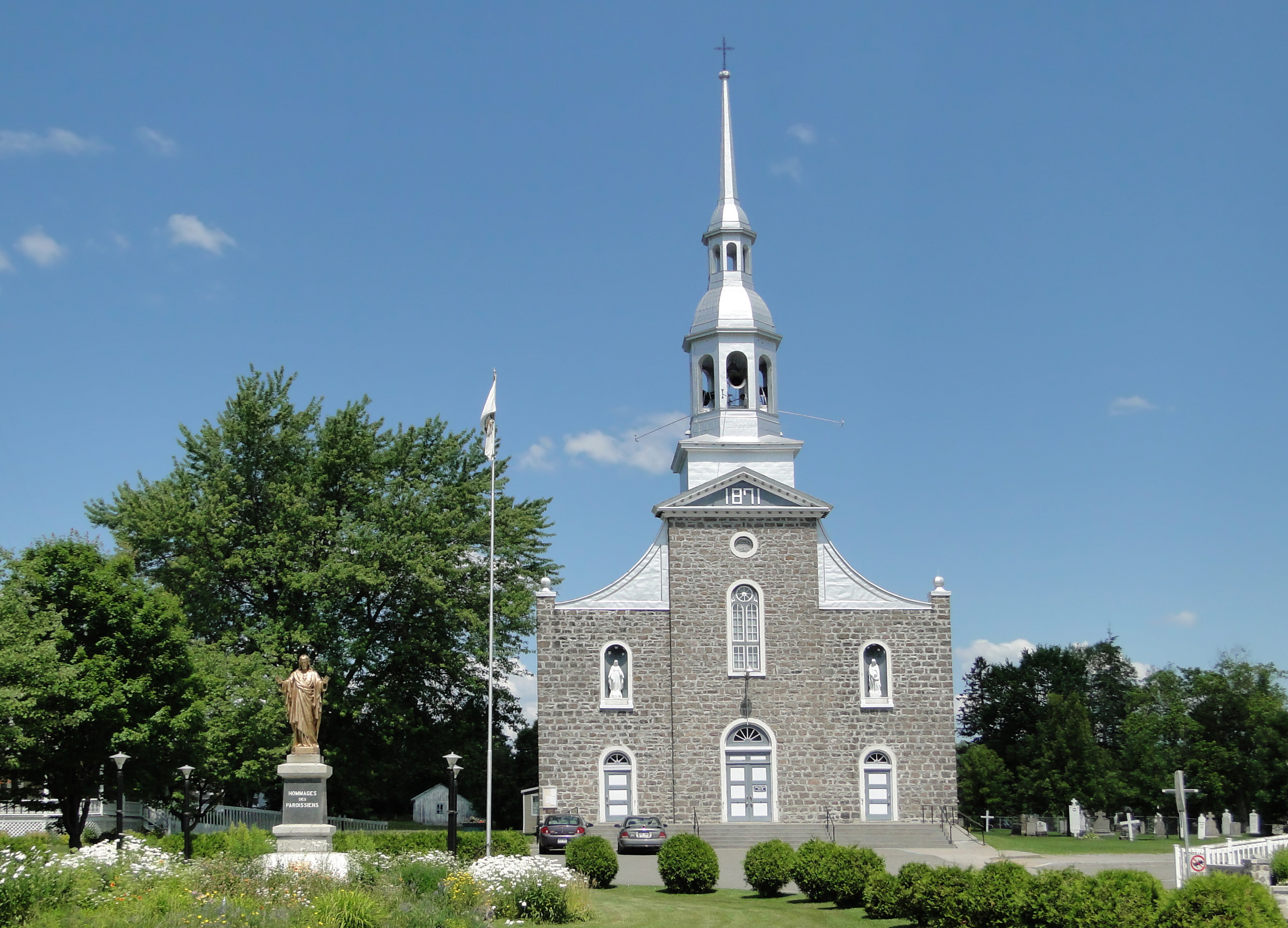
- Saint-Alexis Church
- Motto: Progrès et Harmonie
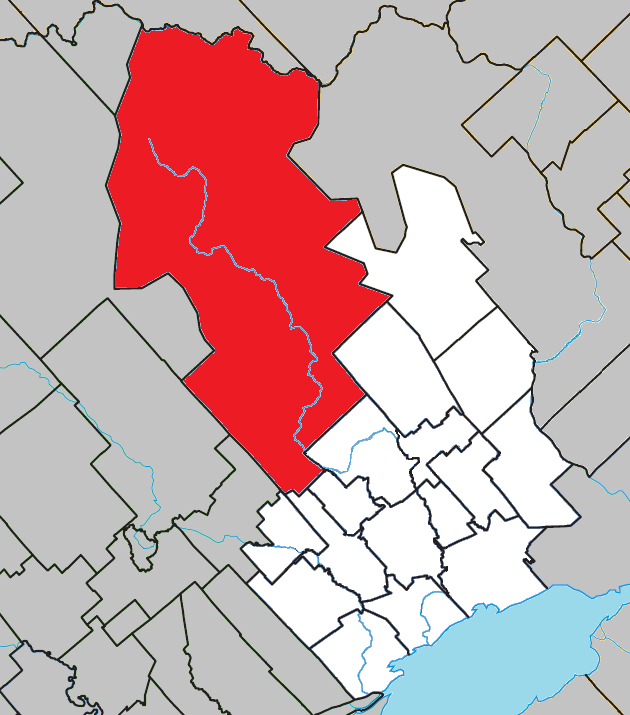
- Location within Maskinongé RCM

- Location in central Quebec
- Coordinates: 46°28′N 73°08′W
- Country: Canada
- Province: Quebec
- Region: Mauricie
- RCM: Maskinongé
- Settled: 1865
- Constituted: April 21, 1984

Government
  - Mayor: Nancy Johnson
  - Fed. riding: Berthier—Maskinongé
  - Prov. riding: Maskinongé

Area
  - Total: 1,138.24 km^{2} (439.48 sq mi)
  - Land: 1,035.74 km^{2} (399.90 sq mi)

Population (2021)
  - Total: 2,999
  - Density: 2.9/km^{2} (7.5/sq mi)
  - Change 2016-21: ▲0.6%
  - Dwellings: 2,136
- Time zone: UTC−5 (EST)
  - Summer (DST): UTC−4 (EDT)
- Postal code(s): J0K 1V0
- Area code: 819
- Highways: R-349
- Website: www.saint-alexis-des-monts.ca

Saint-Alexis-des-Monts (French pronunciation: [sɛ̃t‿alɛksi de mɔ̃]) is a parish municipality in the Mauricie region of the province of Quebec in Canada.

It is located in the Laurentian Mountains, having a topography that is characterized by valleys and rounded hills, with an altitude varying between 150 metres (490 ft) to 560 metres (1,840 ft). There are more than 600 lakes, 400 named and another 200 unnamed minor lakes. The majority (65%) of its territory is part of the Matawin Wildlife Reserve. The town depends on outdoor tourism that increases its seasonal population to between 8000 and 10,000 persons.

== History ==
The first settlers were originally from Saint-Paulin and established the community on the banks of the Du Loup River, north-west of Saint-Paulin, around 1865. On October 30 of that year, Alexis Lefebvre Boulanger (1812–1885), pioneer and farmer, donated the land on which the village's chapel was built in 1867, and the church in 1884. Saint-Alexis was named after him.

The Saint-Alexis post office opened in 1876. On April 21, 1877, the Parish Municipality of Saint-Alexis was formed.

On November 3, 1973, the Municipality of Belleau was created out of previously unorganized territory, located in the geographic township of Belleau and named in honour of Sir Narcisse-Fortunat Belleau (1808–1894), former lieutenant-governor of Quebec. On April 21, 1984, Belleau merged with Saint-Alexis to form the Parish Municipality of Saint-Alexis-des-Monts. It had a surface area of more than 500 square kilometres (190 sq mi). On December 9, 1995, 763 square kilometres (295 sq mi) was added following the annexation of the Lac-Marcotte and Lac-au-Sorcier unorganized territories.

== Demographics ==
In the 2021 Census of Population conducted by Statistics Canada, Saint-Alexis-des-Monts had a population of 2,999 living in 1,593 of its 2,136 total private dwellings, a change of 0.6% from its 2016 population of 2,981. With a land area of 1,035.74 km^{2} (399.90 sq mi), it had a population density of 2.9/km^{2} (7.5/sq mi) in 2021.

Canada census – Saint-Alexis-des-Monts community profile

	2021	2016	2011
Population	2,999 (+0.6% from 2016)	2,981 (-2.1% from 2011)	3,046 (-2.3% from 2006)
Land area	1,035.74 km^{2} (399.90 sq mi)	1,048.39 km^{2} (404.79 sq mi)	1,048.28 km^{2} (404.74 sq mi)
Population density	2.9/km^{2} (7.5/sq mi)	2.8/km^{2} (7.3/sq mi)	2.9/km^{2} (7.5/sq mi)
Median age	59.2 (M: 60.0, F: 58.8)	56.3 (M: 56.6, F: 55.9)	52.5 (M: 52.3, F: 52.9)
Private dwellings	2,136 (total) 1,593 (occupied)	2,149 (total)	2,036 (total)
Median household income	$50,000	$41,216	$36,984

References: 2021 2016 2011

Historical census populations – Saint-Alexis-des-Monts

Year	Pop.	±%
1986	2,604	—
1991	2,745	+5.4%
1996	2,741	−0.1%
2001	2,909	+6.1%

Year	Pop.	±%
2006	3,118	+7.2%
2011	3,046	−2.3%
2016	2,981	−2.1%
2021	2,999	+0.6%

Population counts are not adjusted for boundary changes.
Source: Statistics Canada

Historical census populations – Saint-Alexis

Year	Pop.	±%
1881	1,039	—
1891	1,194	+14.9%
1901	1,496	+25.3%
1911	1,618	+8.2%
1921	1,713	+5.9%
1931	1,724	+0.6%
1941	1,791	+3.9%

Year	Pop.	±%
1951	2,235	+24.8%
1956	2,481	+11.0%
1961	2,645	+6.6%
1966	2,615	−1.1%
1971	2,325	−11.1%
1976	2,378	+2.3%
1981	2,478	+4.2%

Source: Statistics Canada

Mother tongue (2021):

- English as first language: 0.7%
- French as first language: 98.0%
- English and French as first languages: 0.5%
- Other as first language: 0.7%
