= Saint-Édouard-de-Maskinongé =

- Municipality
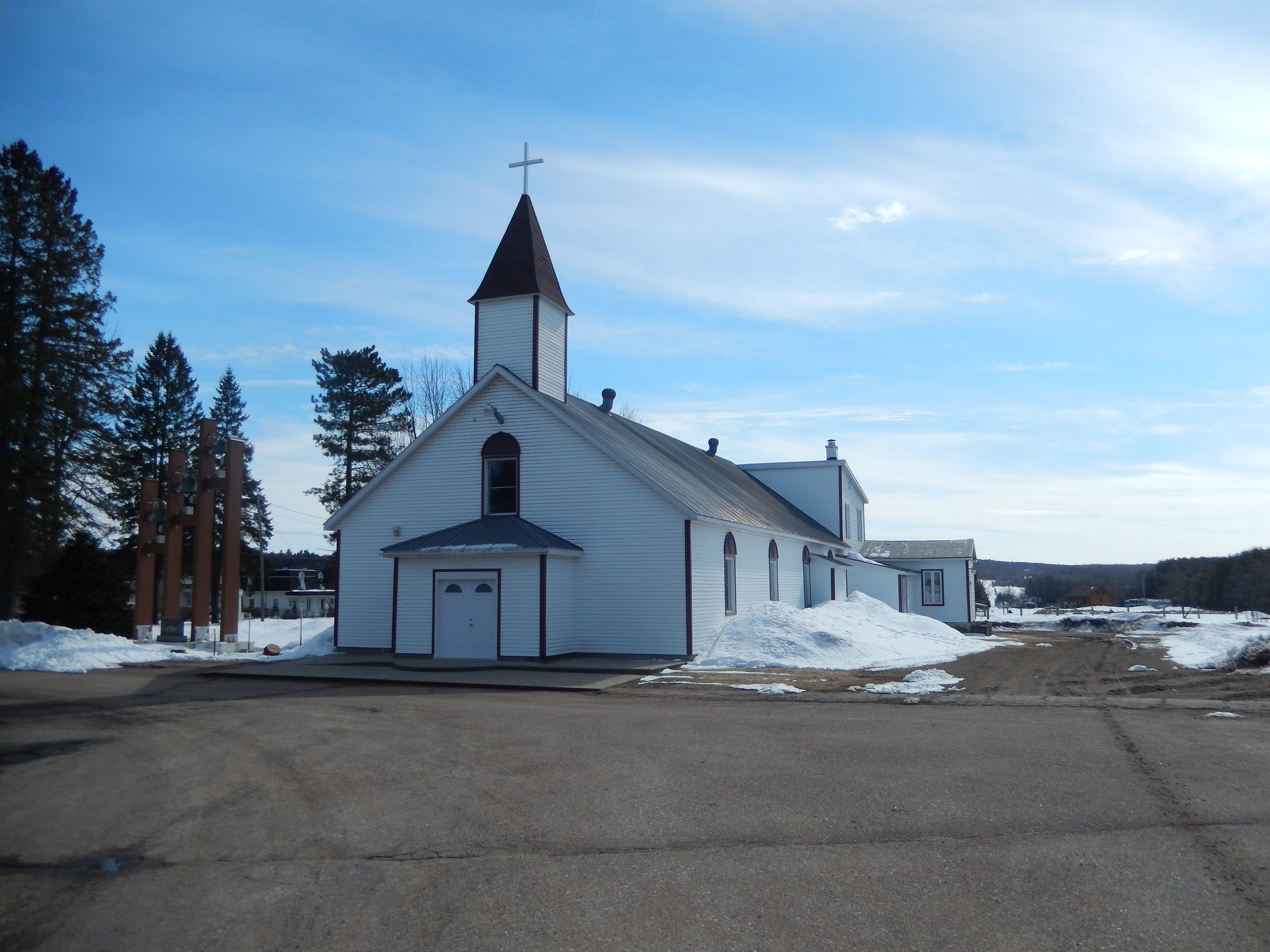
- Saint-Édouard Church

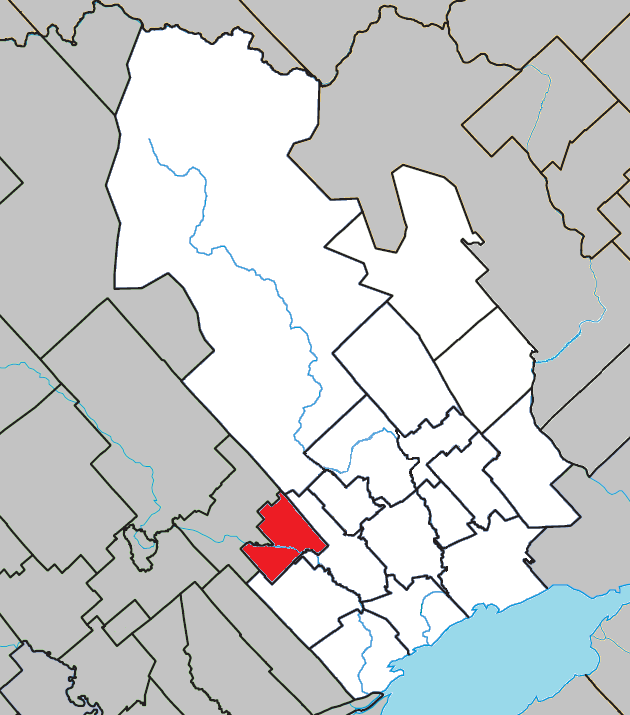
- Location within Maskinongé RCM

- Location in central Quebec
- Coordinates: 46°20′N 73°09′W
- Country: Canada
- Province: Quebec
- Region: Mauricie
- RCM: Maskinongé
- Constituted: January 1, 1950

Government
  - Mayor: Johanne Champagne
  - Fed. riding: Berthier—Maskinongé
  - Prov. riding: Maskinongé

Area
  - Total: 53.88 km^{2} (20.80 sq mi)
  - Land: 52.82 km^{2} (20.39 sq mi)

Population (2021)
  - Total: 798
  - Density: 15.1/km^{2} (39/sq mi)
  - Change 2016-21: ▲12.1%
  - Dwellings: 402
- Time zone: UTC−5 (EST)
  - Summer (DST): UTC−4 (EDT)
- Postal code(s): J0K 2H0
- Area code(s): 819
- Highways: R-348 R-350
- Website: municipalites-du-quebec.org/st-edouard-de-maskinonge/

Saint-Édouard-de-Maskinongé (French pronunciation: [sɛ̃t‿edwaʁ də maskinɔ̃ʒe]) is a municipality in the Mauricie region of the province of Quebec in Canada.

== Demographics ==
Historical census populations – Saint-Édouard-de-Maskinongé

Year	Pop.	±%
1951	685	—
1956	716	+4.5%
1961	800	+11.7%
1966	761	−4.9%
1971	772	+1.4%
1976	739	−4.3%
1981	686	−7.2%
1986	700	+2.0%

Year	Pop.	±%
1991	734	+4.9%
1996	744	+1.4%
2001	730	−1.9%
2006	800	+9.6%
2011	774	−3.2%
2016	712	−8.0%
2021	798	+12.1%

Source: Statistics Canada

Private dwellings occupied by usual residents (2021): 359 (total dwellings: 402)
