= Charette, Quebec =

Charette
- Municipality
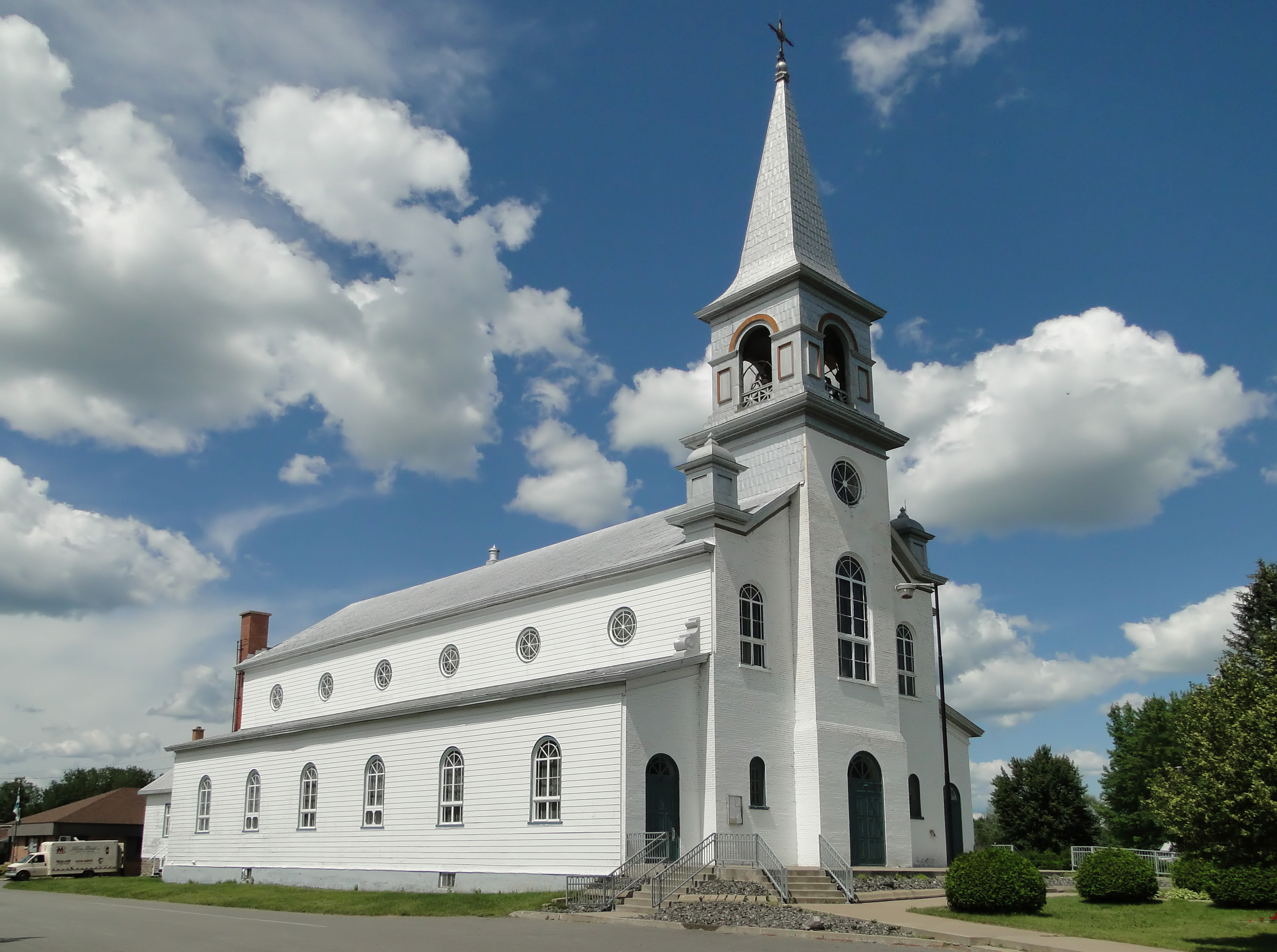
- Church Notre-Dame-des-Neiges

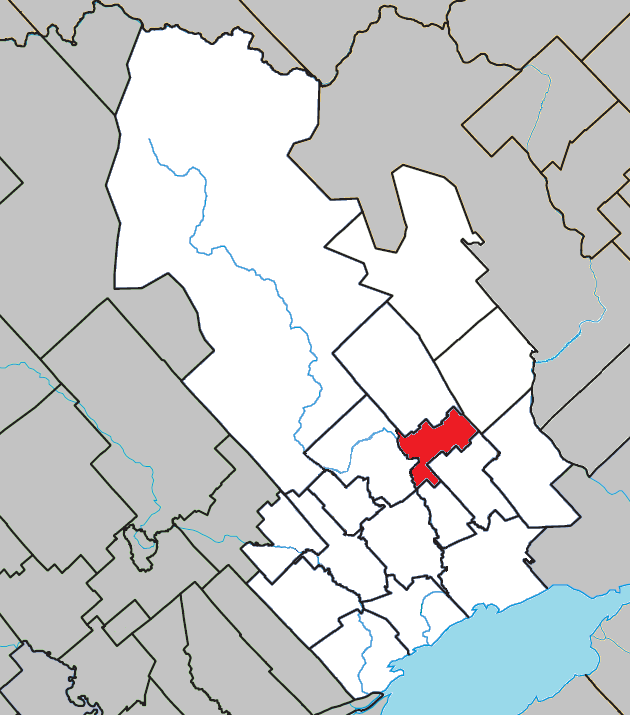
- Location within Maskinongé RCM

- Location in central Quebec
- Coordinates: 46°27′N 72°56′W
- Country: Canada
- Province: Quebec
- Region: Mauricie
- RCM: Maskinongé
- Settled: c. 1875
- Constituted: February 9, 1918

Government
  - Mayor: Claude Boulanger
  - Fed. riding: Berthier—Maskinongé
  - Prov. riding: Maskinongé

Area
  - Total: 42.26 km^{2} (16.32 sq mi)
  - Land: 41.90 km^{2} (16.18 sq mi)

Population (2021)
  - Total: 1,034
  - Density: 24.7/km^{2} (64/sq mi)
  - Change 2016-21: ▲8.5%
  - Dwellings: 519
- Time zone: UTC−5 (EST)
  - Summer (DST): UTC−4 (EDT)
- Postal code(s): G0X 1E0
- Area code(s): 819
- Highways: R-350 R-351
- Website: www.municipalite-charette.ca

Charette (French pronunciation: [ʃaʁɛt]) is a municipality of about 1000 people located in Maskinongé Regional County Municipality, in Quebec, Canada.

== History ==
Charette is named in honour of one of its first settlers, Édouard Charette, originally from Sainte-Ursule, who built a saw mill and flour mill around 1875. In 1910, the post office opened and in 1918, the Municipality of Charette was established when the Parish of Notre-Dame-des-Neiges (formed in 1914) was incorporated. Its railway station identified the place with the English name of Charette's Mills for a period of time.

On December 31, 2001, Charette was added to the Maskinongé RCM when Le Centre-de-la-Mauricie Regional County Municipality was dissolved.

== Demographics ==
Historical census populations – Charette, Quebec

Year	Pop.	±%
1921	922	—
1931	1,186	+28.6%
1941	1,136	−4.2%
1951	1,102	−3.0%
1956	1,108	+0.5%
1961	1,125	+1.5%
1966	1,095	−2.7%
1971	1,009	−7.9%
1976	881	−12.7%

Year	Pop.	±%
1981	951	+7.9%
1986	966	+1.6%
1991	968	+0.2%
1996	962	−0.6%
2001	941	−2.2%
2006	924	−1.8%
2011	993	+7.5%
2016	953	−4.0%
2021	1,034	+8.5%

Source: Statistics Canada

Private dwellings occupied by usual residents (2021): 485 (total dwellings: 519)

Mother tongue (2021):

- English as first language: 0.5%
- French as first language: 97.6%
- English and French as first languages: 1.0%
- Other as first language: 0.5%

== List of mayors ==
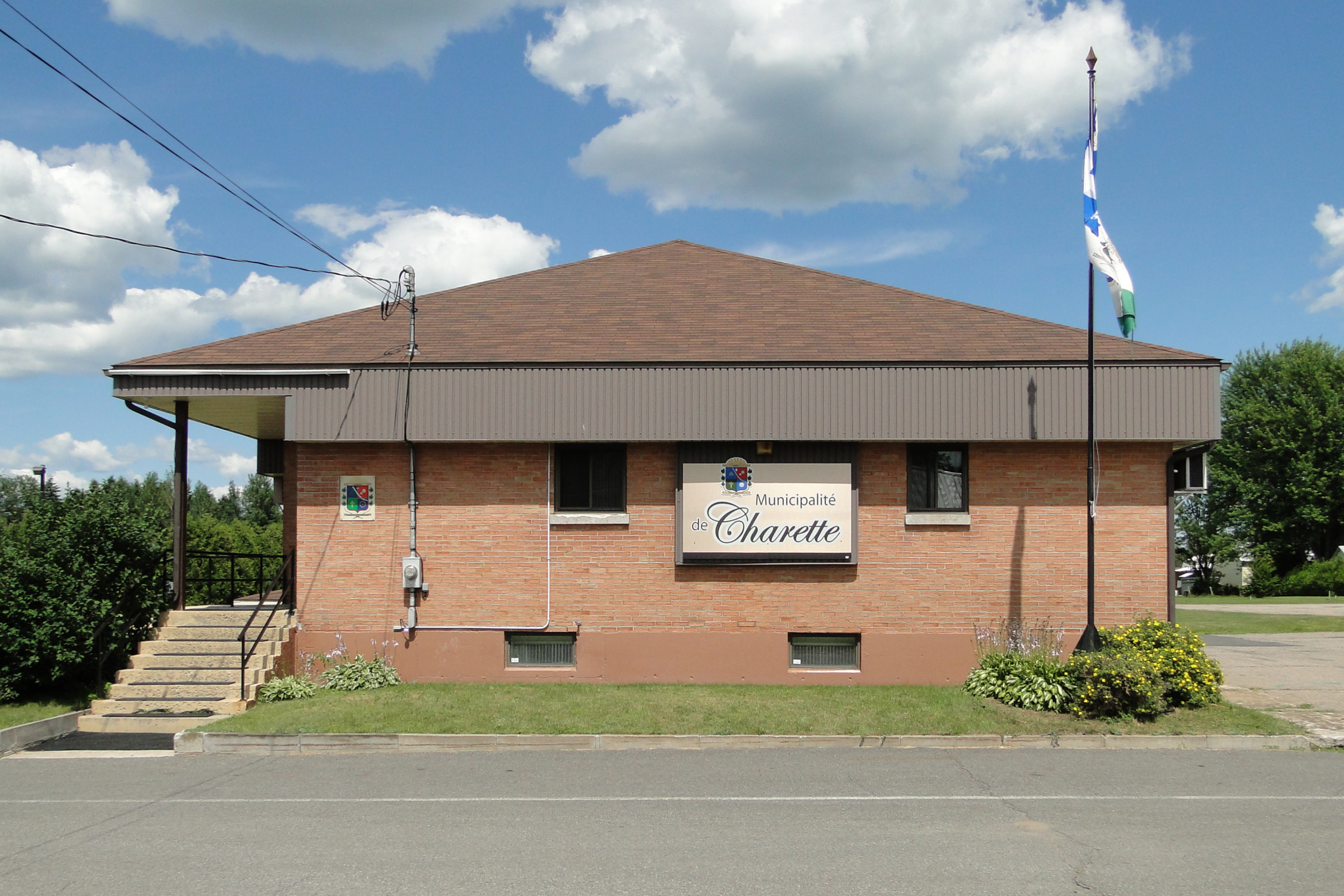
Town hall of Charette

The mayor is the municipality's highest elected official. Charette has had fourteen mayors. Officially, municipal elections in Charette are on a non-partisan basis.

#	Mayor	Taking Office	Leaving
1	Joseph de Charette	1918	1927
2	Alphonse de Charette	1927	1933
3	Hermile Gélinas	1933	1937
4	Wilfrid Bellemare	1937	1939
5	Raymond Gélinas	1939	1941
6	Clément De Charette	1941	1943
7	Viatime Gélinas	1943	1945
8	Louis Lesieur	1945	1947
9	Adélard Matteau	1947	1949
3	Hermile Gélinas	1949	1951
10	Gérard Matteau	1951	1961
11	Marcel Bournival	1961	1967
12	Germain Gélinas	1967	1971
11	Marcel Bournival	1971	1995
13	Pauline St-Yves	1995	1999
14	Claude Boulanger	1999	2009
15	Guy Diamond	2009	2013
14	Claude Boulanger	2013	Current
