= Louiseville =

- City
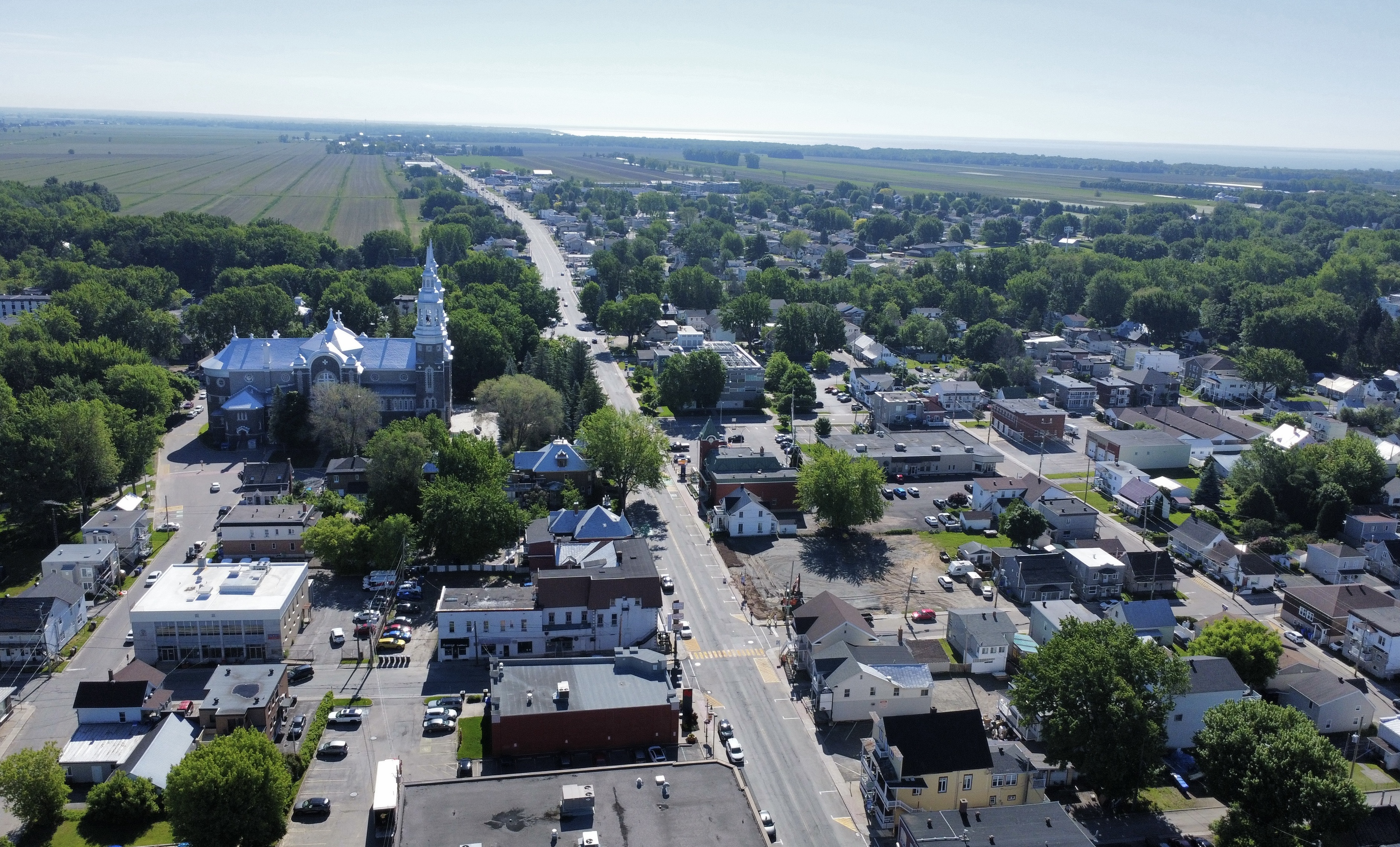
- Aerial view of Louiseville
- Motto(s): Excellence et Harmonie ("Excellence and Harmony")
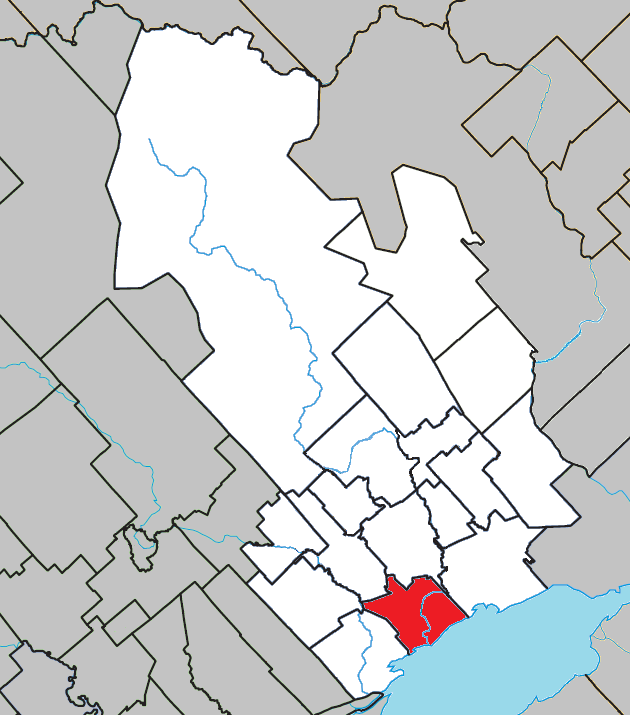
- Location within Maskinongé RCM

- Location in central Quebec
- Coordinates: 46°15′N 72°57′W
- Country: Canada
- Province: Quebec
- Region: Mauricie
- RCM: Maskinongé
- Settled: 1714
- Constituted: December 31, 1988

Government
  - Mayor: Yvon Deshaies
  - Fed. riding: Berthier—Maskinongé
  - Prov. riding: Maskinongé

Area
  - Total: 63.54 km^{2} (24.53 sq mi)
  - Land: 62.59 km^{2} (24.17 sq mi)
  - Urban: 4.00 km^{2} (1.54 sq mi)

Population (2021)
  - Total: 7,340
  - Density: 117.3/km^{2} (304/sq mi)
  - Urban: 5,577
  - Urban density: 1,394.4/km^{2} (3,611/sq mi)
  - Change 2016-21: ▲2.6%
  - Dwellings: 3,857
- Time zone: UTC−5 (EST)
  - Summer (DST): UTC−4 (EDT)
- Postal code(s): J5V
- Area code: 819
- Highways A-40: R-138 R-348 R-349
- Website: ville.louiseville.qc.ca

Louiseville (French pronunciation: [lwizvil]) is a town in the Mauricie region of the province of Quebec, Canada. It is located near the mouth of the Rivière-du-Loup, on the north shore of Lake Saint-Pierre.

Louiseville is twinned with Soissons in France and Cerfontaine in Belgium.

== History ==
The area was originally part of the la Seignorie Rivière-du-Loup. This seignory was formed in 1665 by Intendant Jean Talon and granted in 1672 to Charles Dugey Rozoy-de-Mannereuil, officer in the Carignan Regiment. The seignory was thereafter also known as Rivière-Mannereuil for some time.

In 1714, a mission was formed by the Récollets who dedicated it to the patronage of Anthony of Padua. In 1722, the Ursulines owned the seignory and attempted to change the name to Saint-Antoine-de-la-Rivière-Saint-Jean but the settlement became known as Rivière-du-Loup or Rivière-du-Loup-en-Haut after the seignory or local river.

In 1816, its post office opened. In 1845, the Parish Municipality of Rivière-du-Loup-en-Haut was formed, and abolished two years later in 1847. It was reestablished in 1855 as Saint-Antoine-de-la-Rivière-du-Loup, named after the parish patron and the seignory. In 1878, the main settlement separated from the parish municipality and formed the Village Municipality of Rivière-du-Loup. Just one year later it was renamed to Louiseville in order to avoid confusion with another town called Rivière-du-Loup in the Bas-Saint-Laurent region. The new name was a tribute to Princess Louise, viceregal consort of Canada, the third daughter of Queen Victoria, who had planned to visit the Mauricie that same year.

On January 1, 1989, the parish and village municipalities merged again and became the Town of Louiseville.

== Demographics ==
In the 2021 Census of Population conducted by Statistics Canada, Louiseville had a population of 7,340 living in 3,659 of its 3,857 total private dwellings, a change of 2.6% from its 2016 population of 7,152. With a land area of 62.59 km^{2} (24.17 sq mi), it had a population density of 117.3/km^{2} (303.7/sq mi) in 2021.

Historical census populations – Louiseville
Year	Pop.	±%
1991	8,000	—
1996	7,911	−1.1%
2001	7,622	−3.7%
2006	7,433	−2.5%
2011	7,517	+1.1%
2016	7,152	−4.9%
2021	7,340	+2.6%
Source: Statistics Canada

Mother tongue (2021):

- English as first language: 0.7%
- French as first language: 96.7%
- English and French as first languages: 0.4%
- Other as first language: 1.9%

== Notable residents ==
- Marcelle Ferron, GOQ (January 29, 1924 – November 19, 2001), a painter and stained glass artist
- Pierre "Doc" Mailloux (January 14, 1949 – January 12, 2024), controversial psychiatrist and radio show host
- George Henry Yale, 1st Mayor of Louiseville and military officer

== See also ==
- Royal eponyms in Canada
