= Sainte-Angèle-de-Prémont =

- Municipality
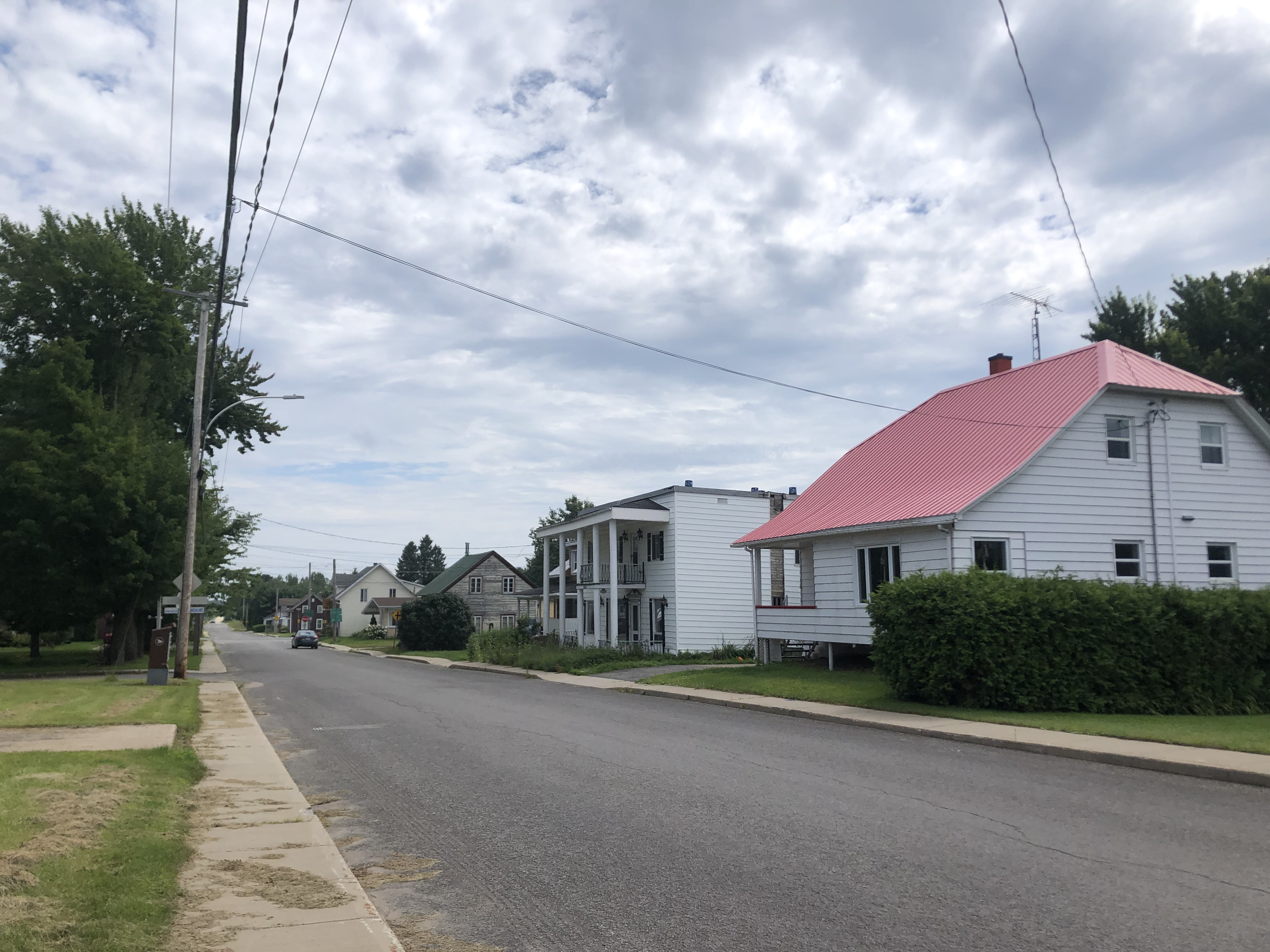

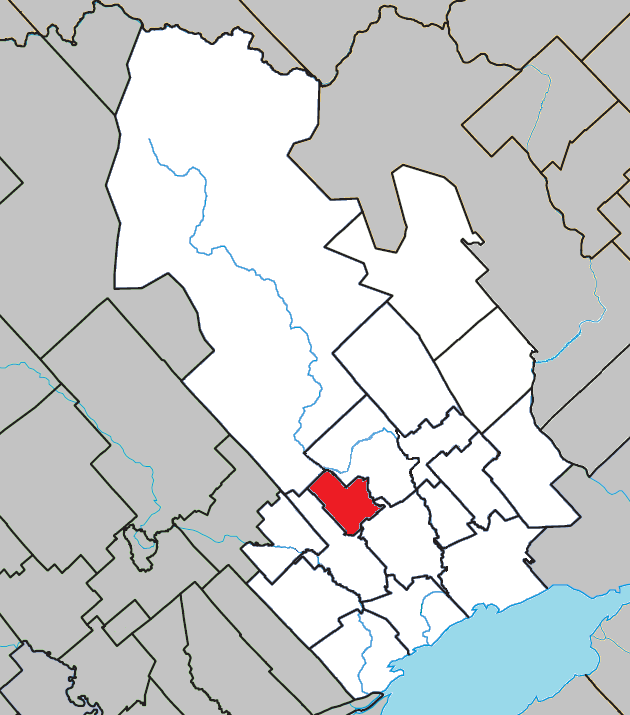
- Location within Maskinongé RCM

- Location in central Quebec
- Coordinates: 46°22′N 73°03′W
- Country: Canada
- Province: Quebec
- Region: Mauricie
- RCM: Maskinongé
- Constituted: August 28, 1917

Government
  - Mayor: Barbara Paillé
  - Fed. riding: Berthier—Maskinongé
  - Prov. riding: Maskinongé

Area
  - Total: 37.71 km^{2} (14.56 sq mi)
  - Land: 37.73 km^{2} (14.57 sq mi)
- There is an apparent discrepancy between 2 authoritative sources.

Population (2021)
  - Total: 631
  - Density: 16.7/km^{2} (43/sq mi)
  - Change 2016-21: ▲5.9%
  - Dwellings: 349
- Time zone: UTC−05:00 (EST)
  - Summer (DST): UTC−04:00 (EDT)
- Postal code(s): J0K 1R0
- Area code(s): 819
- Highways: R-350
- Website: www.sainte-angele-de-premont.ca

Sainte-Angèle-de-Prémont (French pronunciation: [sɛ̃t ɑ̃ʒɛl də pʁemɔ̃]) is a municipality in Maskinongé Regional County Municipality (RCM), in the Mauricie, region of the province of Quebec, Canada.

The economy of this municipality is mainly focused on forestry and agriculture.

== History ==
In 1917, the Parish of Sainte-Angèle was formed, named in honour of Angela Merici. That same year, the Parish Municipality of Sainte-Angèle was created, and its post office opened under the name "Prémont".

On April 30, 1988, it changed its status and name to become the Municipality of Sainte-Angèle-de-Prémont.

== Demographics ==
Historical census populations – Sainte-Angèle-de-Prémont

Year	Pop.	±%
1921	494	—
1931	531	+7.5%
1941	740	+39.4%
1951	763	+3.1%
1956	790	+3.5%
1961	680	−13.9%

Year	Pop.	±%
1966	573	−15.7%
1971	626	+9.2%
1976	583	−6.9%
1981	542	−7.0%
1986	583	+7.6%
1991	605	+3.8%

Year	Pop.	±%
1996	637	+5.3%
2001	631	−0.9%
2006	663	+5.1%
2011	647	−2.4%
2016	596	−7.9%
2021	631	+5.9%

Population counts are not adjusted for boundary changes.
Source: Statistics Canada
