= Saint-Boniface, Quebec =

Saint-Boniface
- Municipality
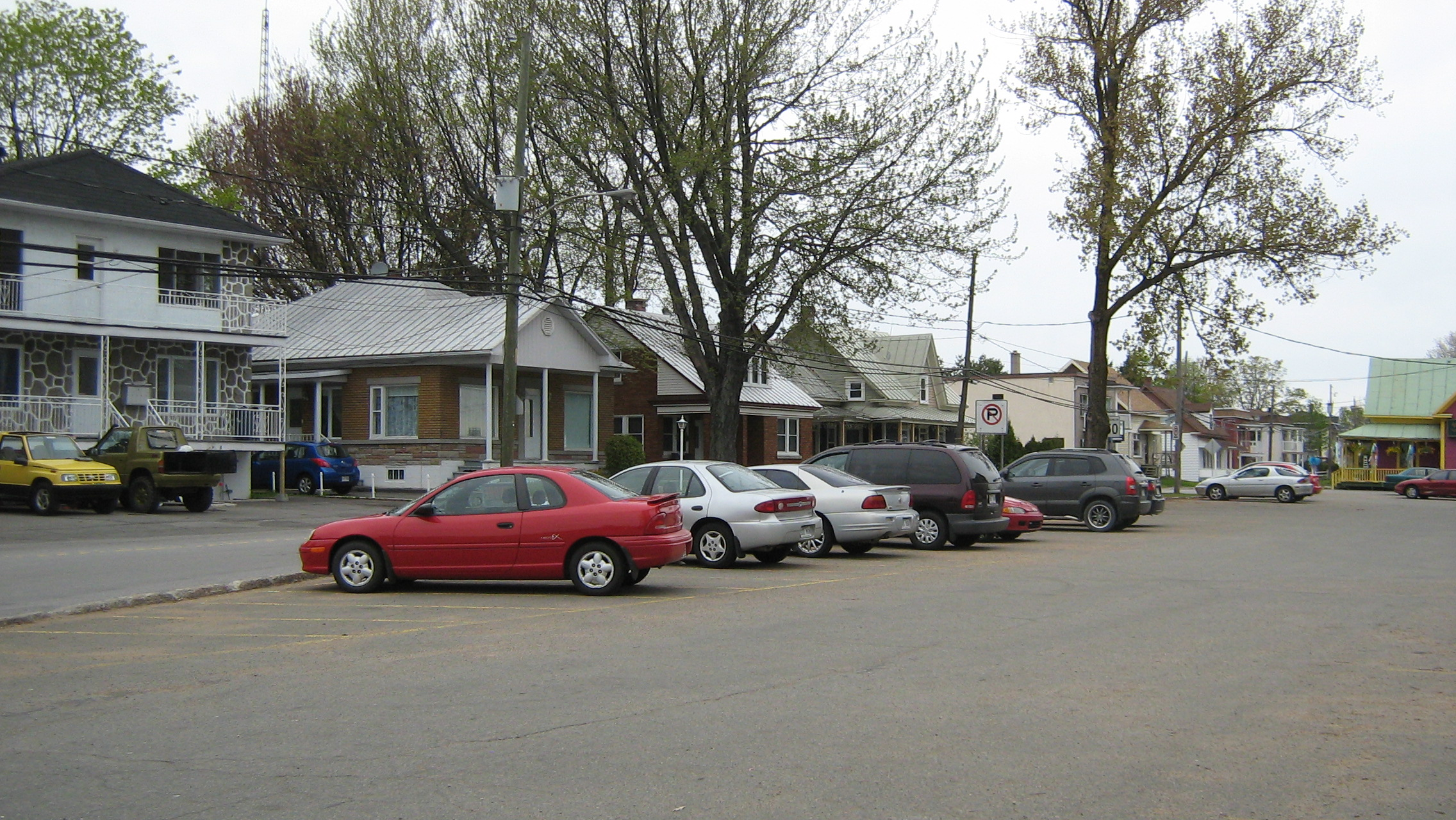

- Coat of arms
- Nickname: Saint-Bo
- Motto: Omnia ad bonum, nihil ad malum ("Everything for Good, Nothing for Evil")
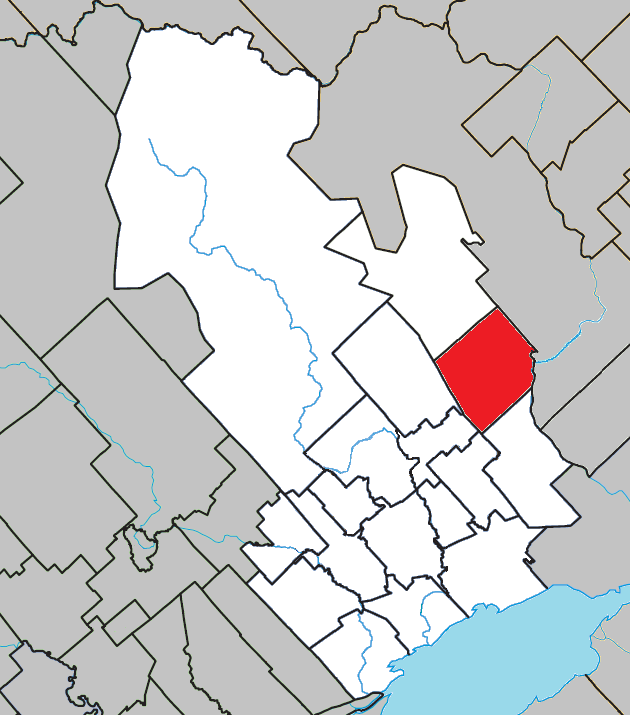
- Location within Maskinongé RCM

- Location in central Quebec
- Coordinates: 46°30′N 72°49′W
- Country: Canada
- Province: Quebec
- Region: Mauricie
- RCM: Maskinongé
- Settled: 1840s
- Constituted: January 1, 1962

Government
  - Mayor: Alain Gélinas
  - Fed. riding: Berthier—Maskinongé
  - Prov. riding: Saint-Maurice

Area
  - Total: 111.85 km^{2} (43.19 sq mi)
  - Land: 107.42 km^{2} (41.48 sq mi)

Population (2021)
  - Total: 5,156
  - Density: 48/km^{2} (120/sq mi)
  - Pop 2016-2021: ▲6.7%
  - Dwellings: 2,205
- Time zone: UTC−5 (EST)
  - Summer (DST): UTC−4 (EDT)
- Postal code(s): G0X 2L0
- Area code(s): 819
- Highways A-55: R-153 R-350
- Website: municipalitesaint-boniface.ca

Saint-Boniface (French pronunciation: [sɛ̃ bɔnifas]) is a municipality in the Mauricie region of the province of Quebec, Canada.

== History ==
In 1962, Saint-Bonlface-de-Shawinigan Village annexed Saint-Boniface-de-Shawinigan Municipality.

On April 5, 2003, the village municipality of Saint-Boniface-de-Shawinigan changed its legal status and its name and became the municipality of Saint-Boniface.

== Demographics ==
Historical census populations – Saint-Boniface, Quebec

Year	Pop.	±%
1966	2,670	—
1971	2,581	−3.3%
1976	2,680	+3.8%
1981	3,164	+18.1%
1986	3,294	+4.1%
1991	3,813	+15.8%

Year	Pop.	±%
1996	3,998	+4.9%
2001	3,998	+0.0%
2006	4,180	+4.6%
2011	4,511	+7.9%
2016	4,832	+7.1%
2021	5,156	+6.7%

Source: Statistics Canada

Private dwellings occupied by usual residents (2021): 2,098 (total dwellings: 2,205)

Mother tongue (2021):

- English as first language: 0.6%
- French as first language: 98.6%
- English and French as first languages: 0.4%
- Other as first language: 0.6%
