= Maskinongé Regional County Municipality =

Maskinongé
- Regional county municipality
- Coordinates: 46°19′N 72°56′W
- Country: Canada
- Province: Quebec
- Region: Mauricie
- Effective: January 1, 1982
- County seat: Louiseville

Government
  - Type: Prefecture
  - Prefect: Charline Plante

Area
  - Total: 2,502.40 km^{2} (966.18 sq mi)
  - Land: 2,367.08 km^{2} (913.93 sq mi)

Population (2021)
  - Total: 37,292
  - Density: 15.8/km^{2} (41/sq mi)
  - Change 2016-2021: ▲2.7%
  - Dwellings: 19,380
- Time zone: UTC−5 (EST)
  - Summer (DST): UTC−4 (EDT)
- Area code: 819
- Website: mrcmaskinonge.ca

Maskinongé (French pronunciation: [maskinɔ̃ʒe]) is a regional county municipality in the Mauricie region of Quebec, Canada. The seat is Louiseville. It is located adjacent on the west of Trois-Rivières on the Saint Lawrence River.

The population according to the 2021 Canadian Census was 37,292, an increase of 2.7% over the 2016 population.

== History ==
The RCM was formed on January 1, 1982, and it consisted of Hunterstown Township (now part of Saint-Paulin); Belleau Municipality (now part of Saint-Alexis-des-Monts); the parish municipalities of Saint-Alexis-des-Monts, Sainte-Angèle (since renamed to Sainte-Angèle-de-Premont), Sainte-Anne-d'Yamachiche (now part of Yamachiche), Saint-Antoine-de-la-Rivière-du-Loup (now part of Louiseville), Saint-Barnabé, Saint-Édouard (since renamed to Saint-Édouard-de-Maskinongé), Saint-Joseph-de-Maskinongé (now part of Maskinongé), Saint-Justin, Saint-Léon-le-Grand, Saint-Paulin, Saint-Sévère, and Sainte-Ursule; and the village municipalities of Louiseville, Maskinongé, Saint-Paulin, and Yamachiche.

On January 1, 2002, the municipalities of Charette, Saint-Boniface-de-Shawinigan (since renamed to Saint-Boniface), Saint-Élie (since renamed to Saint-Élie-de-Caxton), Saint-Étienne-des-Grès, and Saint-Mathieu-du-Parc were transferred to the Maskinongé Regional County Municipality when the Centre-de-la-Mauricie and Francheville Regional Counties were dissolved.

== Subdivisions ==
There are 17 subdivisions within the RCM:

Cities & Towns (1)

- Louiseville

Municipalities (11)

- Charette
- Maskinongé
- Saint-Boniface
- Saint-Édouard-de-Maskinongé
- Saint-Élie-de-Caxton
- Saint-Justin
- Saint-Mathieu-du-Parc
- Saint-Paulin
- Sainte-Angèle-de-Prémont
- Sainte-Ursule
- Yamachiche

Parishes (5)

- Saint-Alexis-des-Monts
- Saint-Barnabé
- Saint-Étienne-des-Grès
- Saint-Léon-le-Grand
- Saint-Sévère

== Transportation ==
=== Access Routes ===
Highways and numbered routes that run through the municipality, including external routes that start or finish at the county border:

- Autoroutes
  - A-40
- Principal Highways
  - R-132
  - R-153
- Secondary Highways
  - R-348
  - R-349
  - R-350
  - R-351
- External Routes
  - None

== See also ==
- List of regional county municipalities and equivalent territories in Quebec
