= Mauricie =

- Administrative region
- Coordinates: 47°00′N 73°00′W
- Country: Canada
- Province: Quebec
- Regional County Municipalities (RCM) and Equivalent Territories (ET): 3 RCM, 3 ET: Les Chenaux; Maskinongé; Mékinac Regional County Municipality; La Tuque (ET); Shawinigan (ET); Trois-Rivières (ET)

Government
  - Table des élus de la Mauricie (Regional conference of elected officers): Gérard Bruneau (President)

Area
  - Land: 35,860.05 km^{2} (13,845.64 sq mi)

Population (2016)
  - Total: 266,112
  - Density: 7.4/km^{2} (19/sq mi)
  - Change 2011-2016: ▲1.0%
- Time zone: UTC-5 (EST)
  - Summer (DST): UTC-4 (EDT)
- Postal code: G
- Area code: 819, 873
- Website: www.mauricie.gouv.qc.ca

Mauricie (French pronunciation: [mɔʁisi]) is a traditional and current administrative region of Quebec. La Mauricie National Park is contained within the region, making tourism in Mauricie popular. The region has a land area of 35,860.05 km^{2} (13,845.64 sq mi) and a population of 266,112 residents as of the 2016 Census. Its largest cities are Trois-Rivières and Shawinigan.

The word Mauricie was coined by local priest and historian Albert Tessier and is based on the Saint-Maurice river which runs through the region on a North-South axis.

Mauricie administrative region was created on August 20, 1997 from the split of Mauricie–Bois-Francs administrative region into Mauricie and Centre-du-Québec. However, the concept of Mauricie as a traditional region long predates this.

== Administrative divisions ==
=== Regional county municipalities ===
- Les Chenaux Regional County Municipality
- Maskinongé Regional County Municipality
- Mékinac Regional County Municipality

=== Equivalent territories ===
- Agglomeration of La Tuque
- Shawinigan
- Trois-Rivières

=== Indian rerserves ===
- Obedjiwan
- Wemotaci

== Major communities ==
- La Tuque
- Louiseville
- Maskinongé
- Notre-Dame-du-Mont-Carmel
- Saint-Alexis-des-Monts
- Saint-Boniface
- Saint-Étienne-des-Grès
- Saint-Maurice
- Saint-Tite
- Sainte-Anne-de-la-Pérade
- Sainte-Thècle
- Shawinigan
- Trois-Rivières
- Yamachiche

== School districts ==
10 Francophones:

- Centre de services scolaire du Chemin-du-Roy:
  - Trois Rivières (3 districts)
  - Maskinongé and
  - Francheville.
- Centre de services scolaire de l'Énergie:
  - Shawinigan (2 districts),
  - La Tuque,
  - Mékinac and
  - Maskinongé.

Part of Anglophone:

- Central Quebec School Board

== Notable people ==
- Moïsette Olier (1885–1972), writer
- Jacques Plante (1929–1986), ice hockey goaltender
- Jean Chrétien (b.1934), 20th prime minister of Canada
- Sylvain Cossette (b.1963), singer
- Christine Fréchette (b.1970), 33rd premier of Québec
