= Caron (name) =

Caron is both a surname and a given name. Notable people with the name include:

Surname:

- Adolphe-Philippe Caron (1843–1908), Canadian lawyer and politician
- Alain Caron (born 1955), Canadian jazz bassist
- Alain Caron (1938–1986), Canadian ice hockey player
- Alcides Sagarra Carón (born 1936), Cuban boxing trainer
- Alexis Caron (1764–1827), Canadian lawyer and politician
- Alexis Pierre Caron (1899–1966), Canadian politician
- Amy Caron (born 1984), American professional skateboarder
- André Caron (1944–1997), Canadian politician
- André H. Caron, Canadian communication scholar
- Annie Caron (soccer) (born 1964), Canadian soccer player
- Annie Caron (born 1941), French Olympic swimmer
- Antoine Caron (1521–1599), Mannerist painter to the court of the House of Valois
- Arthur Caron (1883–1914), French Canadian failed assassin
- Augustin Caron (1778–1862), Canadian farmer and politician
- Augustin Joseph Caron (1774–1822), French lieutenant colonel
- Aymeric Caron (born 1971), French journalist
- Benjamin Caron (born 1976), British film and television director
- Bernard Caron (born 1952), French football player and manager
- Blossom Caron (1905–1999), Canadian photographer
- Cassidy Caron (born 1992), Métis politician
- Charles Caron (1768–1853), Canadian farmer
- Christine "Kiki" Caron (born 1948), French Olympic swimmer
- Daniel J. Caron (born 1957), national librarian, Library and Archives Canada
- David Caron (1952–2018), American attorney
- Delio Caron (1924–2002), Italian rugby league footballer
- Djina Caron (fl. 2000s–2020s), Canadian make-up artist
- Édouard Caron (1830–1900), Canadian politician
- Estelle Caron (1926–2010), Québécois singer and comedian
- Eugène-Charles Caron (1834–1903), French baritone
- Firminus Caron (fl. 1460–1475), French Renaissance composer
- Francine Caron (born 1945), French writer and poet
- François Caron (1600–1673), French Huguenot refugee to the Netherlands, part of Dutch East India Company, director general at Batavia, later director general of French East India Company
- François Caron (politician) (1766–1848), representative of Saint-Maurice in the Legislative Assembly of Lower Canada
- François Michel Marie Ignace Caron (born 1937), French Navy officer and historian
- George Caron (1823–1902), member of the Canadian Parliament
- George Robert "Bob" Caron (1919–1995), Enola Gay tail gunner
- Gérard Caron (1938–2020), French designer
- Gérard Caron (1916–1986), Canadian pianist
- Germain Caron (1910–1966), Canadian politician
- Gilles Caron (1939–1970), French photographer
- Giuseppe Caron (1904–1998), Italian politician
- Glenn Gordon Caron (born 1954), American film and television writer
- Guy Caron (born 1968), Canadian politician
- Hector Caron (1862–1937), Canadian politician
- Henri Caron (1924–2002), French racewalker
- Henri Caron (1906–?), French racing cyclist
- Hipólito Boaventura Caron (1862–1892), Brazilian painter
- Jacques Joseph Caron (born 1940), Canadian ice hockey coach
- Jean-Baptiste Thomas Caron (1869–1944), Canadian lawyer
- Jean-Bernard Caron (born 1974), French Canadian paleontologist
- Jean-Claude Caron (1944–2021), French actor
- Jean-François Caron (born 1957), French politician
- Jean-François Caron (born 1982), Canadian strongman and powerlifter
- Jean-François Caron (born 1987), Canadian writer
- Jean-Luc Caron (born 1948), French physician and musicologist
- Jim Caron, American politician
- Jocelyn "Jo" Caron (fl. 1980s–2000s), Canadian production sound mixer
- Jocelyne Caron (born 1951), Canadian politician
- Jordan Julien Caron (born 1990), Canadian ice hockey forward
- Josee Caron, Canadian classical musician
- Joseph Caron (born 1947), former Canadian high commissioner to India, former ambassador to China and Japan
- Joseph Caron (1868–1954), Canadian politician
- Joseph-Édouard Caron (1866–1930), Canadian politician
- Joseph-Georges Caron (1896–1956), Canadian politician
- Joseph-Napoléon Caron (1896–1970), Canadian politician and hardware store owner
- Joseph Le Caron (1586–1632), Franciscan missionary to Canada
- Kevin Caron (born 1960), American sculptor
- Leslie Caron (born 1931), French actress and dancer
- Linda Caron, Canadian politician
- Louis Caron (born 1942), Canadian journalist
- Louis-Bonaventure Caron (1828–1915), Canadian lawyer and politician
- Lucien Caron (1929–2003), Canadian politician
- Marc Caron (born 1954), Canadian military Chief of Staff
- Marc G. Caron (1946–2022), Canadian-born American neuroscientist and professor
- Marcel Caron (1890–1961), Belgian painter
- Marie-Josèphe Caron (1725–1784), French artist
- Marye Walsh Caron, American politician
- Martin Caron, Canadian classical musician
- Max Caron (born 1989), Canadian football linebacker
- Maxence Caron (born 1976), French philosopher
- Michel Caron (1763–1831), Canadian politician
- Michel Caron (born 1942), Canadian pop singer
- Michel Caron (1929–2001), French opera singer
- Mike Caron, American television director and producer
- Nadine Rena Caron (born 1970), Canadian surgeon
- Nia Caron, Welsh television actress
- Pascal Caron (born 1972), Canadian Olympic bobsledder
- Paul L. Caron, American lawyer
- Pierre Caron (1900–1971), French film director
- Pierre Caron (1875–1952), French historian and archivist
- Pierre Caron (born 1936), Liberal party member of the Canadian House of Commons
- Pierre-Luc Caron (born 1993), Canadian football player
- Raymond Caron (1605–1666), Irish Franciscan
- René-Édouard Caron (1800–1876), Canadian politician
- Robert Caron, Canadian sociologist
- Roger Caron (born 1962), American football coach and player
- Roger Caron (born 1957), Canadian sport shooter
- Roger "Mad Dog" Caron (1938–2012), Canadian bank robber and author
- Ronald "Ron" Caron (1929–2012), Canadian NHL executive
- Rose Caron (1857–1930), French operatic soprano
- Sandra Caron (1936–2025), English actress and writer
- Sébastien Caron (born 1980), French-Canadian NHL goaltender
- Sonia Caron, Quebec politician
- Stéphan Caron (born 1966), French swimmer
- Suzanne Caron, Canadian mayor of Mount Royal
- Tom Caron (born 1963), American sportscaster
- Vincent Caron (fl. 2010s–2020s), Canadian politician
- Wayne Maurice Caron (1946–1968), American hospital corpsman killed in Vietnam
- Yves Caron (1937–2023), Canadian salesperson and politician

Given name:

- Caron Bernstein (born 1970), South African model
- Caron Bowman, Afro-Honduran American artist
- Caron Butler (born 1980), American basketball player
- Caron Keating (1962–2004), Northern Irish TV presenter
- Caron Wheeler (born 1963), British R'n'B/soul singer

== See also ==
- Caron (disambiguation)
- Simon Caron-Huot (born 1984), Canadian theoretical physicist
- Carlon
