= Évariste Carpentier =

Belgian painter (1845–1922)

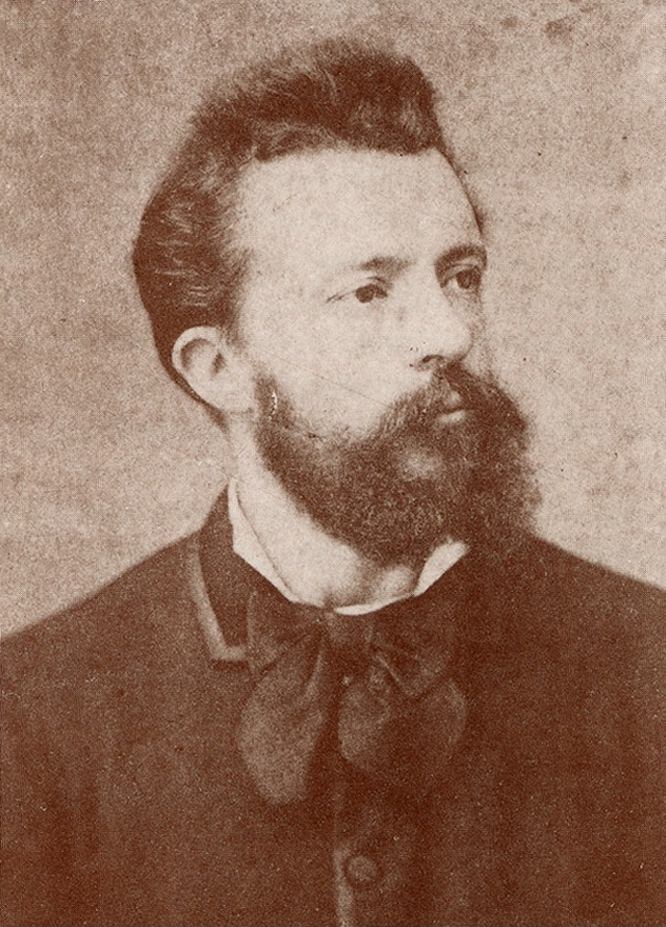
- Évariste Carpentier (Paris, c. 1882)
- Born: 2 December 1845; Kuurne, Belgium
- Died: 22 September 1922 (aged 76); Liège, Belgium
- Known for: Painting
- Notable work: The Strangers; Washing turnips The Small Pond
- Movement: Academicism, naturalism, Impressionism (luminism)

Évariste Carpentier (French pronunciation: [evaʁist kaʁpɑ̃tje]; 1845 – 1922) was a Belgian painter of genre scenes and animated landscapes. Over the years, his painting evolved from academic art to impressionism. Alongside Emile Claus, he is one of the earliest representatives of luminism in Belgium.

== Biography ==
=== Youth ===
Évariste Carpentier was born into a modest family of farmers in Kuurne. He became a pupil at the Academy of Fine Arts of Courtrai in 1861, under the direction of Henri De Pratere. There, he obtained many distinctions.

In 1864, he was admitted to the Royal Academy of Fine Arts Antwerp where he received tuition from Nicaise de Keyser. He proved to be gifted in painting from life, and achieved the prize of excellence in 1865, which allowed him to obtain a private studio in the Academy the following year.

=== Early career ===
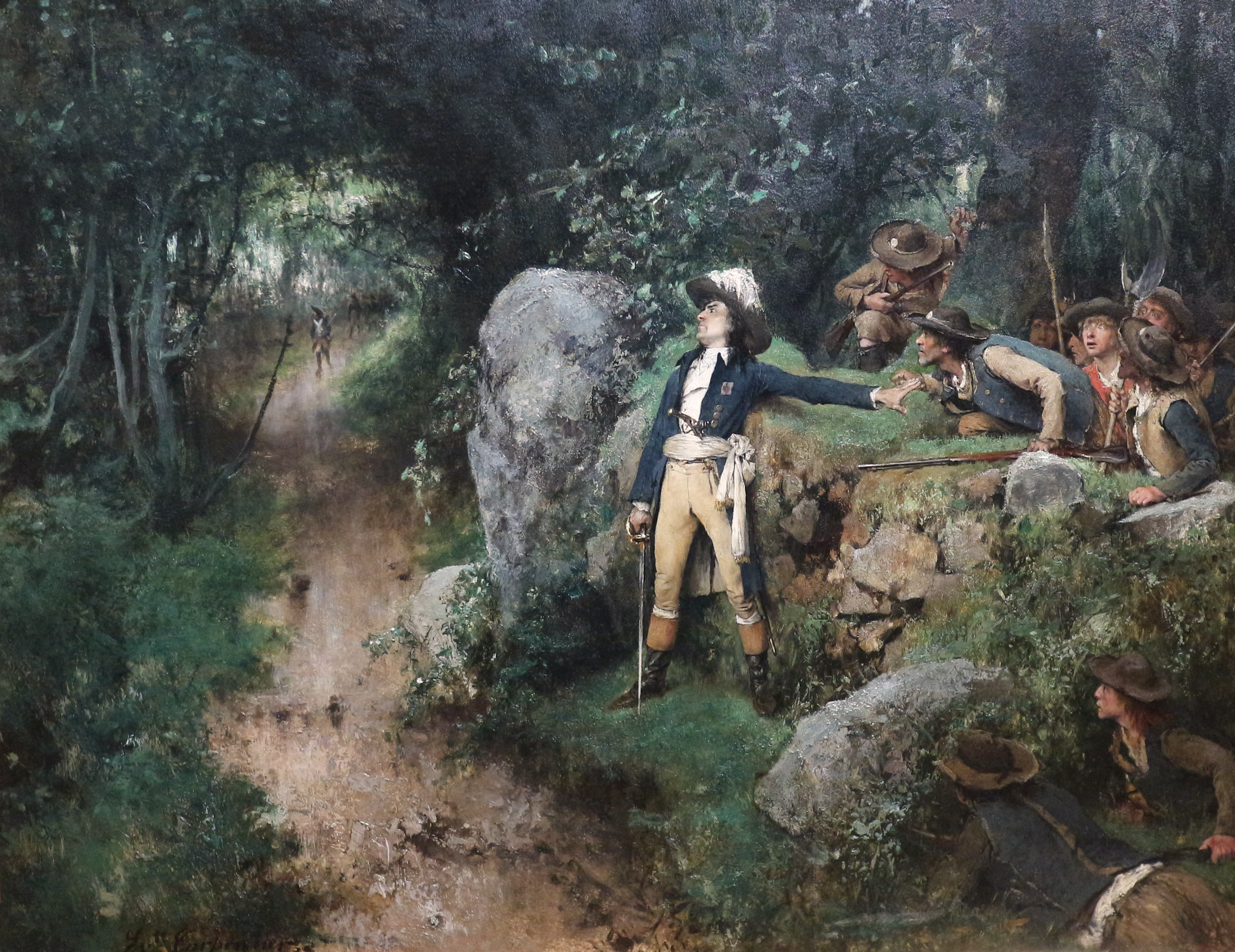
Chouans in Ambush at the Battle of La Gravelle (1793), Musée d'art et d'histoire de Cholet

In 1872, Carpentier established himself in Antwerp and acquired his own studio. It is there that he painted many commissioned works, which did not yet reflect his artistic personality. He began his career addressing religious topics, themes of antiquity and scenes inspired by the Dutch Golden Age painting of the 17th century, but it is in the field of historical painting that he became well known. The painting "Les premières nouvelles du désastre de la Grande Russie", exhibited at the Artistic Circle of Antwerp in 1872, is an example of this success.

In response to the academic tastes of his time, he liked to paint farm animals and, more generally, the charms of rural life.

At around this period, Évariste Carpentier befriended some of his classmates from the Academy, including Emile Claus, Theodoor Verstraete, Frans Hens and Jan Van Beers. They met often at the exhibitions organised by the Artistic Circle of Antwerp. From 1874 to 1877, Émile Claus occupied a corner of Carpenter’s studio.

In 1876, an old knee injury, caused in his youth, developed serious complications and threatened to require amputation. The pain prevented him from working. He left Antwerp to return to his hometown, where his sister provided him with care and treatment for the next three years.

=== France ===
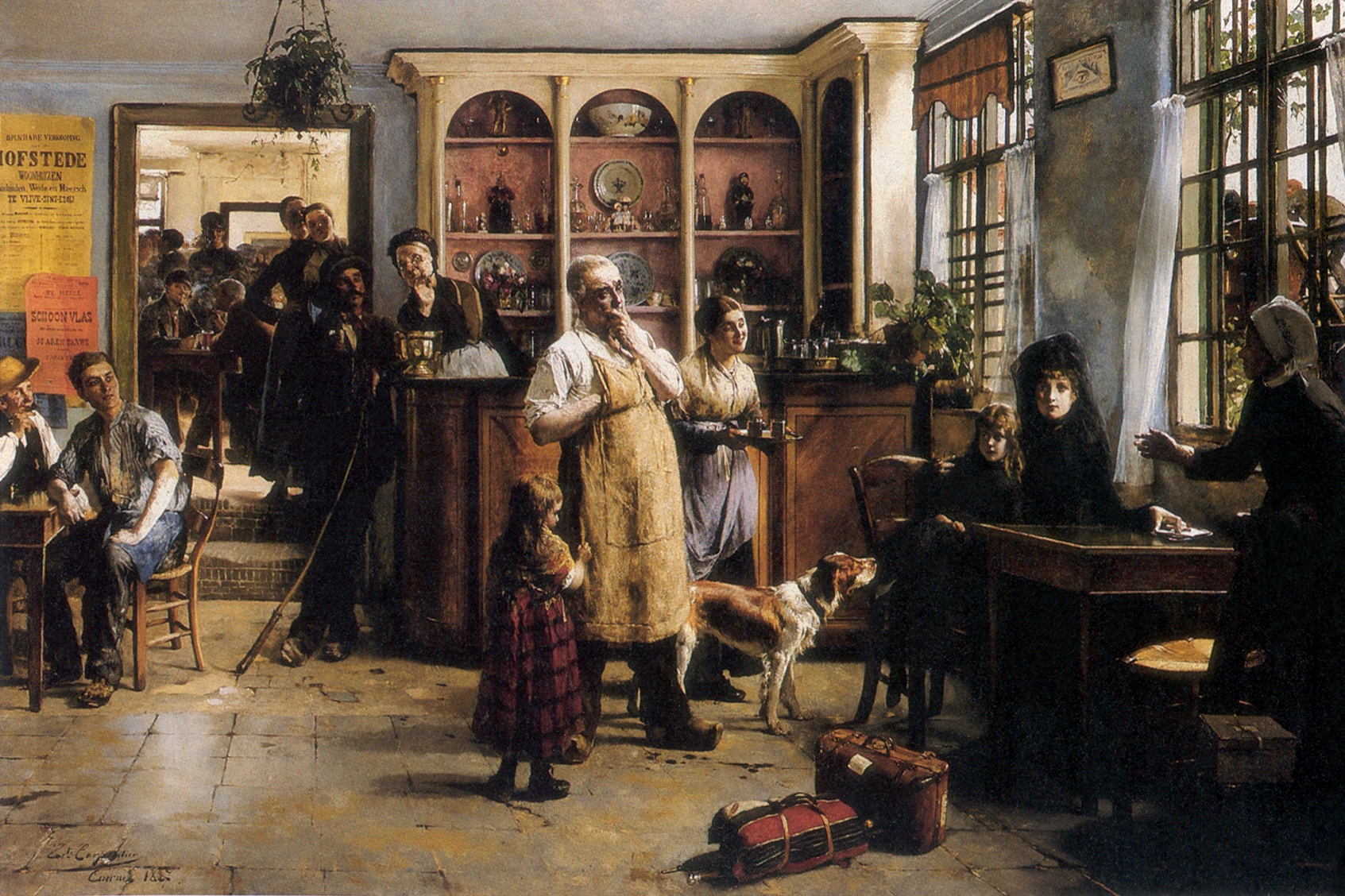
The Lady-strangers (1887) Royal Museums of Fine Arts of Belgium

On the advice of his doctor, Carpentier left Kuurne in 1879 for the south of France, in order to speed up his recovery. The following year, on his return, he stopped in Paris, where he met his friend Jan Van Beers. He was persuaded to move to the French capital, where Van Beers would share his studio with him. Carpentier began to produce realistic paintings of Parisian bourgeoisie.

In 1881, he was finally able to get rid of his crutches permanently and settled in 71 Boulevard de Clichy. He then followed his passion of historical painting. Scenes of the French Revolution, as well as the episodes of the War in the Vendée, became his main sources of inspiration. Having always had a predilection for dramatic episodes, Carpentier refined his composition skills in the search of better ways to depict the pathetic character of minor historical facts, such as those in "Chouans en déroute" (1883) and "Madame Roland à la prison Sainte-Pélagie" (1886). His paintings became highly appreciated by the public.

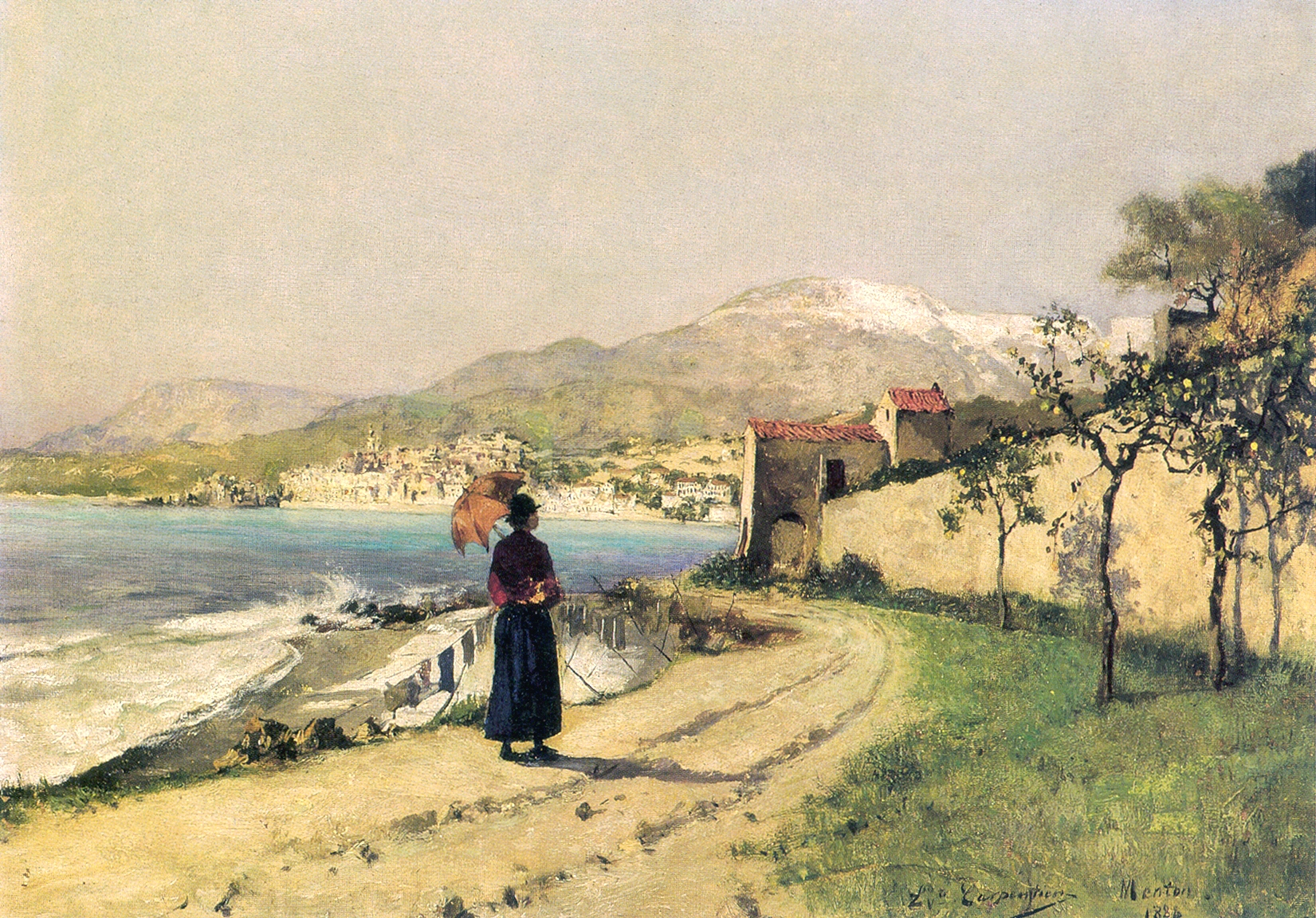
Promenade en bord de mer (Menton, 1888)

This success constituted, however, an obstacle from his discovery of "plein air" painting. In this regard, the year 1884 marked a turning point in his career. Carpentier finally left the conventions of academism and found his true artistic voice. After discovering the works of Jules Bastien-Lepage, he began to dedicate himself to "plein air" painting, turning to nature through the Realism movement. He stayed for two seasons principally at Saint-Pierre-lès-Nemours, near the forest of Fontainebleau, but also at Le Tréport and at Saint-Malo.

=== Return to Belgium ===
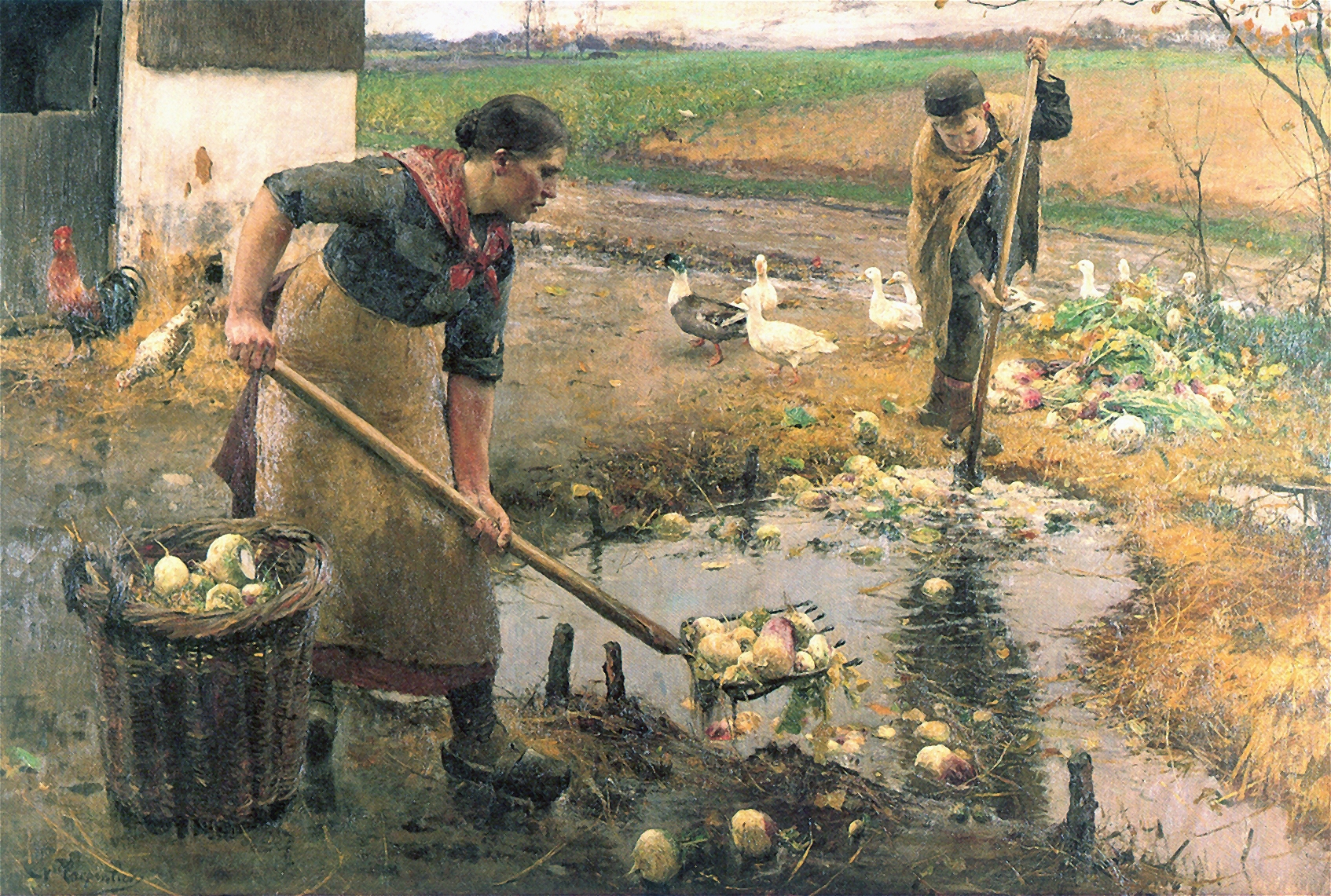
Washing turnips (1890) Musée des beaux-arts de Liège, Liège

Although Carpentier only gave up his studio in Paris in 1892, he returned to Belgium in 1886. There, he witnessed the increasing popularity of impressionism among artists from Brussels, such as Les XX. During his long stay in France, he had already been exposed to impressionists, but he had been influenced to a greater extent by the naturalism of Jules Bastien-Lepage and Jules Breton. His initial outdoor paintings, which had been produced with darker, thicker strokes, gave way to a noticeably brighter palette and progressively lighter brushstrokes.

Once established in Belgium, he continued to travel. From 1886 to 1896, he travelled through the Belgian and French countryside, seeking new landscapes. He frequently visited the Campine in Genk with his friends, the landscape artists Franz Courtens and Joseph Coosemans. He also visited Brittany, a region that had a particularly strong influence on him.

In 1888, Carpentier married Jeanne Smaelen in Verviers. Five children were produced from this marriage.

In 1890, the young couple moved to Belgian Brabant, at Overijse, where Carpentier painted "Washing Turnips", an important work that earned the artist a medal in Paris, and which was acquired by the MAMAC in Liège.

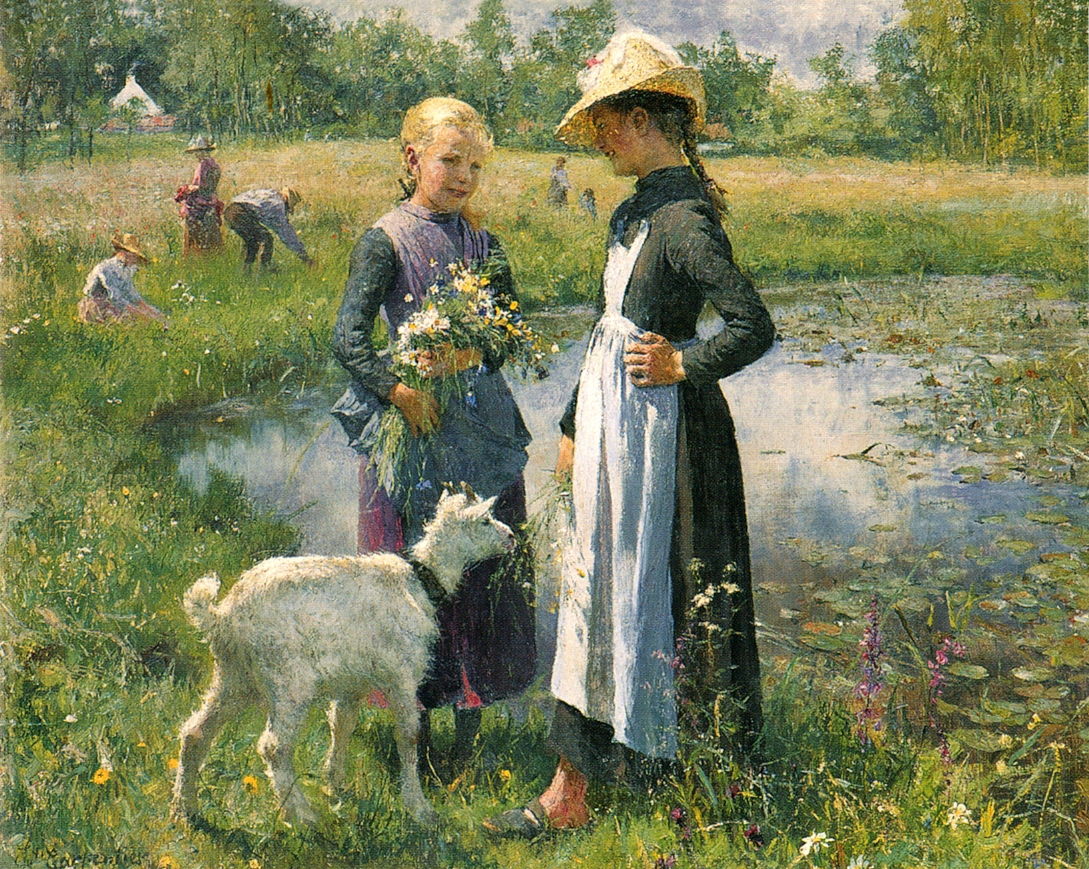
The Small Pond. Museum of Fine Arts, Verviers

In 1892, Carpentier moved again, this time to La Hulpe. During this period, the artist flourished and sought to find the truth of nature, according to his impressionist vision, parallel to that of his friend Emile Claus. He turned to delicate tones and atmospheric touches. Carpentier became one of the most active propagators of luminism.

=== Professor and director ===
In January 1897, Carpentier applied for the position of professor of painting at the Royal Academy of Fine Arts of Liège, which had been vacant since the death of Émile Delperée.

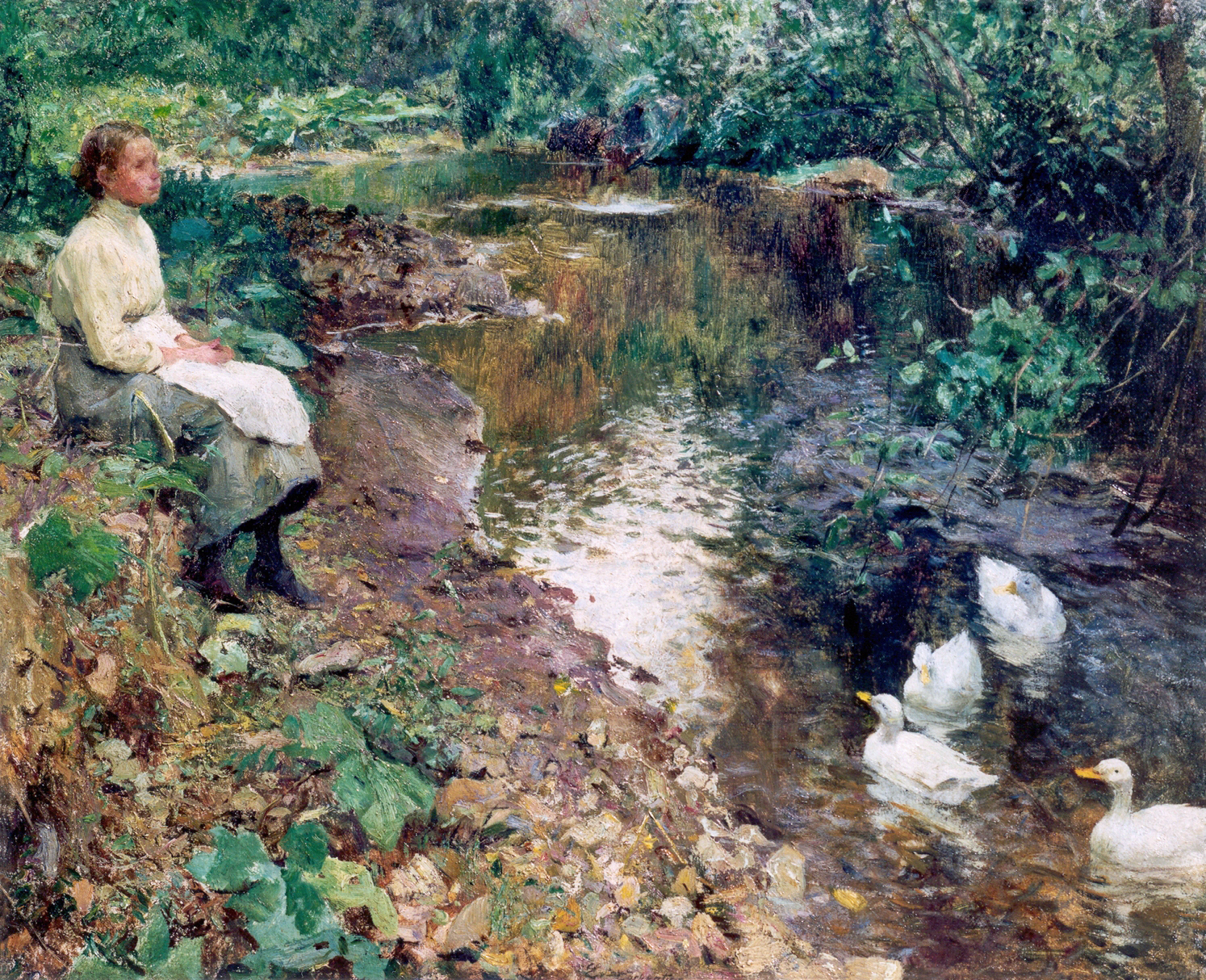
Musing

While serious in his candidature, Carpentier had a disadvantage: he was not from Liège. This was a source of contention. Nevertheless, and despite the backlash from Walloons, he was eventually given the position and moved to Rue Mont Saint-Martin in Liège. He was 51 years old.

In 1904, Carpentier succeeded Prosper Drion as the director of the Academy, a position which he held until 1910. In spite of the disputes caused by his promotion, which hurt him deeply, he carried out his task with the same dedication. From 1905, he lived in Rue Hors-château, still in Liège.

By becoming a professor, Évariste Carpentier helped reshape the evolution of Liège painting. He freed local painting from academic conventions, popularising the impressionist aesthetic.

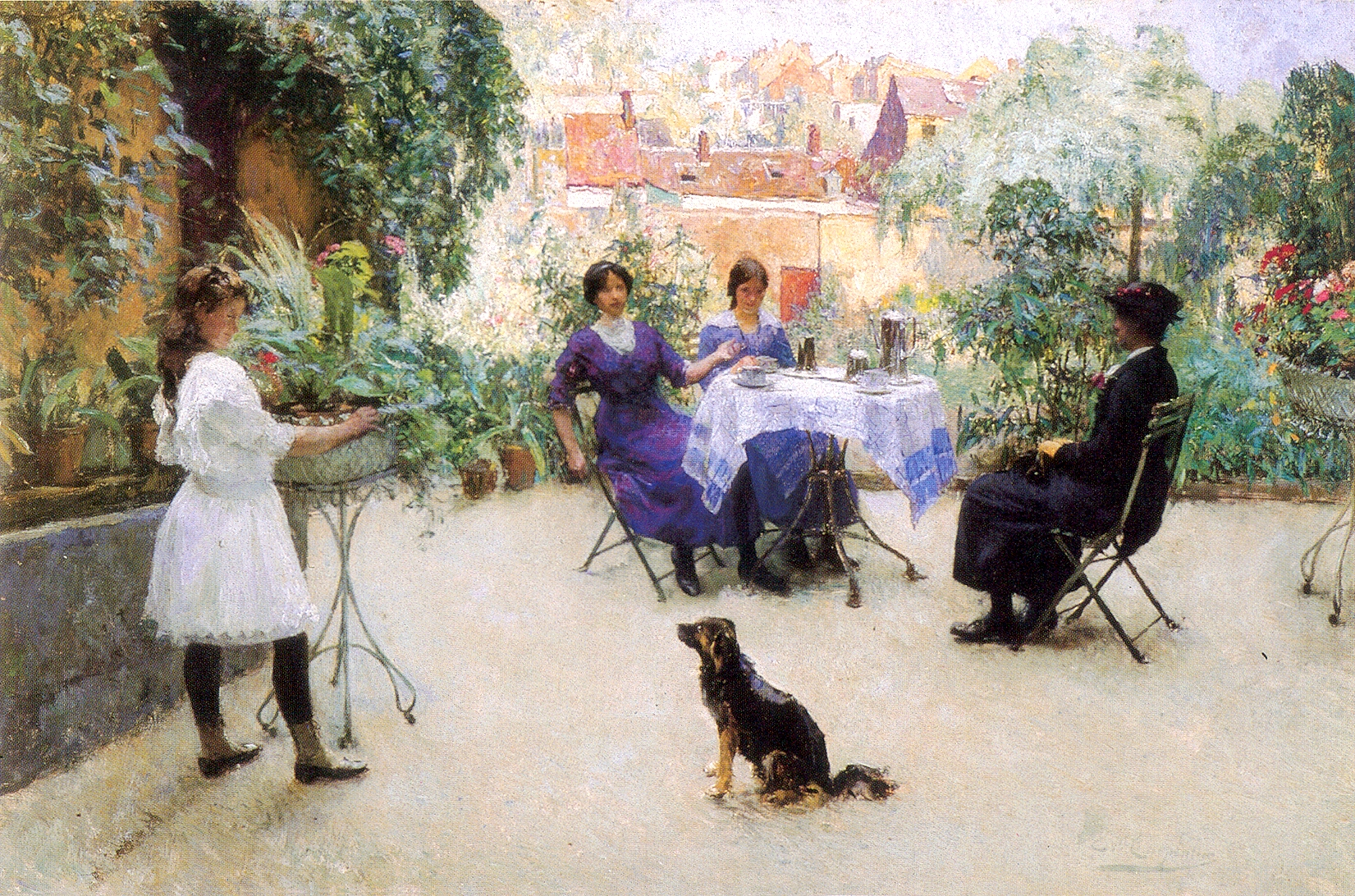
Le goûter des dames

He taught many artists, some of whom did not try to imitate his style. Among the best known of his students who were significantly influenced by his approach were Armand Jamar, Albert Lemaître and José Wolff. Other Liège artists that passed through his class were Fernand Steven, Robert Crommelynck, Adrien Dupagne, Marcel Caron, Jean Donnay and Auguste Mambour. In addition, he provided guidance and advice to painters who did not attend his class, such as Xavier Wurth. The painter of the Ardennes, Richard Heintz, also benefitted from Carpentier’s encouragement.

From 1906, Carpentier spent his summer holidays in Vieuxville, at a house called L'Abbaye de Stavelot.

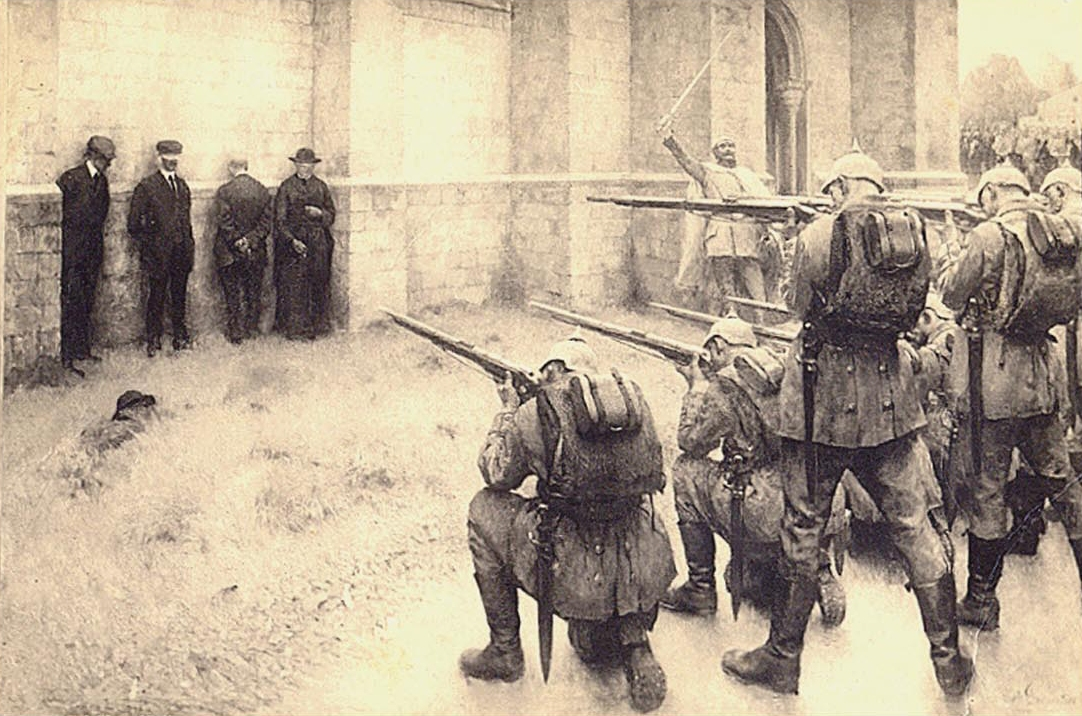
L'exécution des notables de Blégny, 1914

During World War I, Carpentier witnessed the German Rape of Belgium and depicted the execution of Belgian civilians in his work L'exécution des notables de Blégny, 1914.

Carpentier retired in 1919, and died in Liège on 12 September 1922, following a long illness.

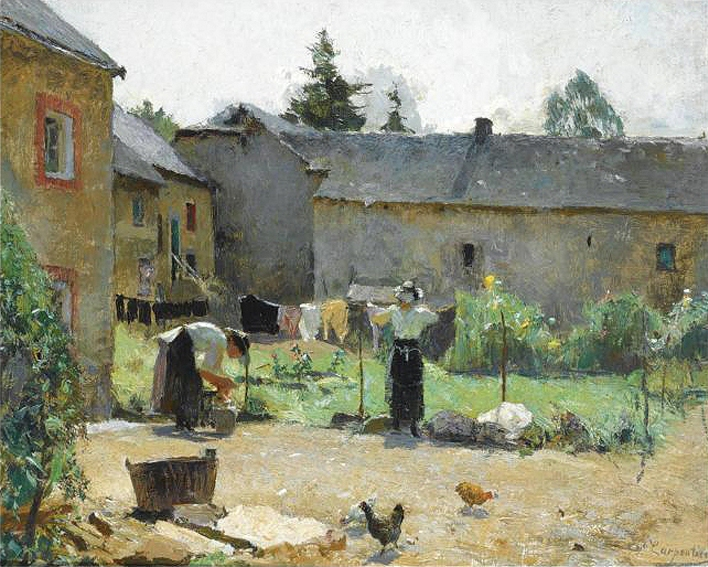
Femmes séchant le linge

== Artwork and legacy ==
During his life, Carpentier achieved a great success. Throughout his career, he won many prizes and awards at international exhibitions, both in Europe and in the United States, receiving the golden medals at Antwerp, Munich and Berlin for "Summer sun" (1896), Paris, Amsterdam, Barcelona and Nice. His work was practically forgotten shortly after his death. However, it was rediscovered towards the end of the 20th century. The importance of his work is now recognised for his contribution as a teacher in the Academy of Liège, where he taught a new way of painting, as well as for the whole of his work as an essential link in the development of modern Belgian painting.

== List of some works in public collections ==
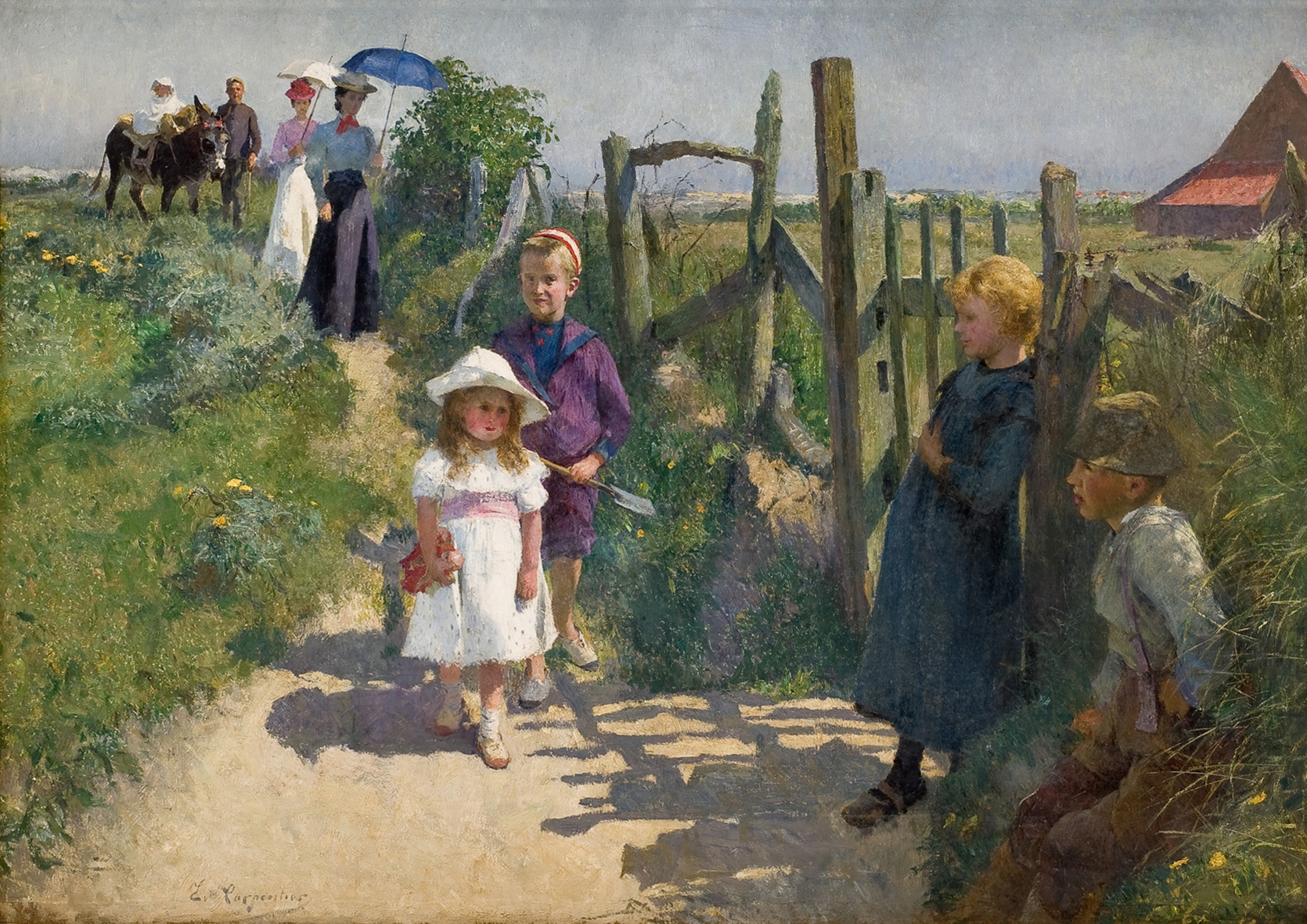
Summer Holiday Musée Fabre, Montpellier

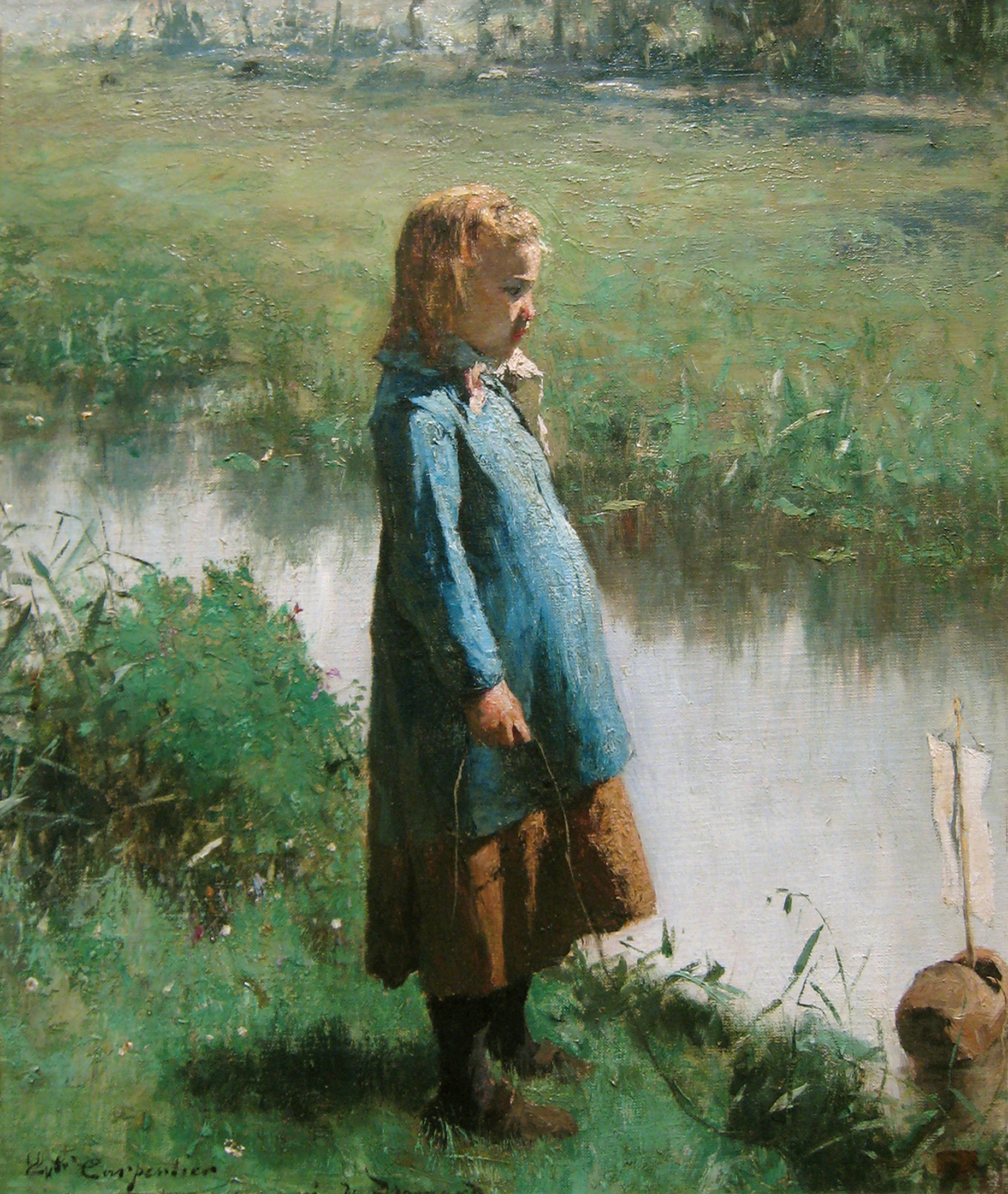
Playing child M - Museum Leuven

- Royal Museum of Fine Arts - Antwerp
  - Episode of the Vendée Revolt 1793
  - Cowherd girl in the Ardennes
- Alte Nationalgalerie - Berlin
  - Summer Sun (1896)
- Town hall of Blegny
  - Execution in Blegny, August 1914
- Royal Museums of Fine Arts of Belgium - Brussels
  - The Lady-strangers (1887) · (Town hall of Kuurne)
- Flemish Community
  - Breakfast on the farm - (Gaasbeek Castle)
  - The visit
- French Community of Belgium
  - After School - (Solvay Castle)
- Art and History Museum - Cholet
  - Chouans in ambush (c. 1883)
  - Chouans routed (1883)
- Broel Museum - Courtray
  - False Alarm (1884)
  - Marsh in the Campine
  - The Reprimand
  - The Young Angler
  - An Intimate Conversation (c. 1893)
- The Municipal Museum of Huy
  - Afternoon Nap (c. 1897)
- Town hall of Kuurne
  - Revolt in the Vendée 1793 (1880)
  - The Bride
  - Visit to the convalescent (c. 1887)
  - The Apple Thief (c. 1892)
- Museum of Fine Arts - Liège
  - De verboden zwempartij (1877)
  - Washing Turnips (1890)
  - The Little Goatherd
  - North Sea (1897)
  - The Ducks
- Prince-Bishops' Palace of Liège
  - Prince-Bishops' Palace (c. 1900)
  - Grand Curtius Palace, Quai de Maastricht (c. 1900)
  - Church of St. Jacques (c. 1900)
  - Church of St. Bartholemew (c. 1900)
  - Pont des Arches en Church of St. Pholien (c. 1900)
  - Basse Sauvenière (c. 1900)
- Museum M - Leuven
  - Playing Child
- Musée Fabre - Montpellier
  - Summer Holiday
- International Art Museum of America - San Francisco
  - The Turnip Pickers
- The Revoltella Museum - Trieste
  - Madame Roland in Sainte-Pelagie (1886)
- Museum of Verviers
  - The Small Pond (c. 1894)
- Private collection (Salon Brussels 1903)
  - Premiers Beaux Jours
