= Karron =

Karron may refer to:

- Karron, Queensland, suburb in Australia
- Karron Graves, American actress and teacher
- Liina Karron (born 1974), Estonian chef
- Richard Karron (1934–2017), American actor and voice actor
- Ruth Karron, American pediatric infectious diseases physician

== See also ==
- Carron (disambiguation)
- Karren
