= Charon (disambiguation) =

Charon, in Greek mythology, is the ferryman who carried the souls of the dead to the underworld.

Charon may also refer to:

== Arts, entertainment, and media ==
- Caronte (album) (Charon), a 1971 album by Italian band The Trip
- Charon (band), a Finnish gothic metal band
- Charon (CrossGen), a comic book character from CrossGen Entertainment's Sigilverse
- Charon (Dungeons & Dragons), a lord of the Yugoloths whose primary function is to provide passage across the River Styx for a steep price
- Charon (Marvel Comics), a villainous wizard
- Charon (The Three Worlds), a fictional human species from Ian Irvine's arc of novels, The Three Worlds Cycle
- Charon, an Eve Online freighter
- Charon, a summon from a password-enhanced Golden Sun: The Lost Age and Golden Sun: Dark Dawn
- Charon V, a fictional submarine in Michael Crichton's novel Sphere
- Commander Charon, one of the Galactic Commanders from Pokémon Platinum

== People with the name ==
- Charon, a Theban military commander (fl. mid-4th century BC); see Androcydes
- Charon of Naucratis, a historian
- Charon of Carthage, a historian
- Charon of Lampsacus, a historian
- Alexios Charon, early 11th-century Byzantine official
- Charon Asetoyer (born 1951), Comanche activist and women's health advocate
- Carl Charon (born 1940), former American football player
- Jacques Charon (1920–1975), French actor and film director
- Jean-Émile Charon (1920–1998), French nuclear physicist, philosopher and writer.
- Joel M. Charon (1939–2018), professor emeritus of sociology at Minnesota State University at Moorhead
- Rita Charon (born 1949), physician and literary scholar
- Viala Charon (1794–1880), French soldier, Governor General of Algeria, Senator of France

== Places ==
- Charon (moon), a moon of the dwarf planet Pluto
- Charon, Louisiana, United States, an unincorporated community in Vermilion Parish

== Science and technology ==
- Charon (gun), an open source 3D-printable gun
- Charon (arachnid), a genus of whipspider
- Charon (software), a legacy hardware emulator for VAX, Alpha, HP 3000, PDP-11, and SPARC systems
- Blue Origin Charon, the first flight test vehicle of Blue Origin

== Other uses ==
- Charon (horse), a racehorse
- HMS Charon, several ships of the British Royal Navy

== See also ==
- Caron (disambiguation)
- Eugenie Margeurite Honoree Charen (1786–1855), French painter
- Mona Charen (born 1957), American columnist, political analyst and writer
- Charron (disambiguation)
- Charun (disambiguation)
- Chaeron (disambiguation)
