= Victor Magnien =

French musician and composer

François Victor Antoine Magnien (21 November 1802 – 8 June 1885) was a French violinist, guitarist, conductor, teacher and composer.

== Life ==
Magnien was born in Épinal, in the French department of Vosges. According to Bone (1914/54), Magnien's father was an administrator of the province of Haute-Marne who was dismissed when allied armies invaded France in 1815 in the course of the Bourbon Restoration. From 1817, he studied for two years in Paris: violin with Rodolphe Kreutzer and guitar with Ferdinando Carulli. In 1820, his family moved to Colmar where "he commenced a career as clerk in the municipal offices", but his father's association with Colonel Augustin Joseph Caron who was executed for conspiracy in 1822 again led to him losing his job and throwing the family into financial difficulties. This caused the young musician to teach violin and guitar in order to support his family, soon gaining the benevolence of influential families in Colmar.

After a few years he continued teaching in Mulhouse. From there, he spent three months a year in Paris to continue his own studies in Paris: violin now with Pierre Baillot and Charles Philippe Lafont, the guitar again with Carulli, and composition with François-Joseph Fétis. His first compositions were duos for violin and guitar, published from 1827 in Paris with Richault who remained his publisher throughout his career.

During the July Revolution of 1830, Magnien concertized in Germany. In 1833, he was appointed conductor of the Société Philharmonique de Beauvais (today the Orchestre Philharmonique de l'Oise), an orchestra he conducted for 13 years. In 1846, he became the director of the Conservatoire de Lille where he, besides administrative duties, still taught violin and guitar. The date of his retirement is not known. But when he became Chevalier of the Légion d'honneur on 14 August 1869, confirmed in a second document of 29 January 1872, he was still director of the conservatory.

Magnien died in Lille, aged 82.

== Music ==
The majority of compositions by Victor Magnien is written for the two instruments he initially studied, the violin and the guitar, including several duets for both instruments (opus 1, 5 and 6). He published at least 11 works for guitar solo, including several multi-movement works or albums of several pieces, as well as at least two guitar duos (opus 10 and 35). His violin music includes several duos for violin and piano, a Fantaisie, Op. 14 for two violins, and one work for violin solo (Op. 41).

His music is eminently suited for his chosen instruments. It includes technically ambitious and melodically attractive works in the contemporary Romantic style. After long neglect, some guitar works have been revived and recorded in recent years.

== Selected works ==
Unfortunately, in the case of Richault, the publisher's plate numbers do not give an indication of the dates of publication, nor does the online catalogue of the Bibliothèque nationale de France give many dates. Bone indicates 1827 to 1831, but this period must in fact have been much longer.

=== Guitar music ===
- Variations sur l'air russe "Schöne Minka" et sur un thème de Préciosa, Op. 7
- Six Andante à plusieurs parties, Op. 8
- Nocturne concertant, Op. 10, for two guitars
- Deux Quadrilles de contredanses, Op. 13
- Variations, précédées d'une introduction sur un thème suisse favori, Op. 15
- Six Menuets, Op. 16
- Six Andante, Op. 17
- Bataille, fantaisie imitative, Op. 18
- Premier mélange sur des airs favoris de l'opéra "Il Crociato" de Meyerbeer, Op. 20
- Grandes variations sur un thème de l'opéra de "Sémiramis" de Rossini, Op. 22
- Douze Galopes, Op. 23
- Thème original varié, Op. 28
- Deux Duos, Op. 35, for two guitars

=== Violin music ===
- Duos concertantes, Op. 1, for violin and guitar
- Thème de "Preciosa" (de Weber), varié, for violin and string quartet or piano, Op. 2
- Duo concertant, Op. 5, for violin and guitar
- Duo concertant, Op. 6, for violin and guitar
- Fantaisie et variations concertantes sur un thème suisse favori, Op. 14, for two violins
- Étude pour le violon, Op. 41 (1842)
- 4 Mélodies dans les 3 premières positions, Op. 48, for violin and piano (1859)
- Fantaisie-Caprice, Op. 49, for violin and piano (1853)
- 2ème Divertissement: Boléro, Op. 52, for violin and piano (1858)

=== Piano solo ===
- Le Soir au bord d'un lac suisse, Op. 51 (1854)
- Deux Morceaux élégants (London, 1854); 1. Jeanne Hachette, 2. Souvenir de Beauvais
- Morceau de salon, Op. 53 (1861)
- Frère et soeur. Deux Romances sans paroles, Op. 54 (1863); online at Gallica.

=== Writings ===
- Théorie musicale [etc.] (Paris: Richault, 1837)
- Notice biographique sur Charles-Marie, baron de Weber (Beauvais: Moisand, 1847)

== Recordings ==
- Duos concertants, Opp. 5 and 6, performed by Gilles Colliard (violin) and Agustin Maruri (guitar) (EMEC Records E 041, 2012).
- Guitar works Opp. 8, 16, 17, 28, performed by Pascal Valois (Centaur CRC 3469, CD 2016).
- Andante, Op. 17 No. 1, performed by David Jacques (ATMA Classique ACD2 2806, CD 2020).
