= Marye =

Marye is a surname and personal name, most often seen as an alternate spelling of "Mary". Notable people with the name include:

== Surname ==
- Madison Marye, politician
- Simon B. Marye, politician
- John Lawrence Marye, Jr., politician
- P. Thornton Marye, architect
- George T. Marye, banker and diplomat

== Personal name ==
- Marye Walsh Caron, American politician
- Marye Dahnke, home economist
- Marye Anne Fox, chemist and administrator
- Marye of Yejju, warlord
