= Michel Caron =

Michel Caron may refer to:

- Michel Caron (politician) (1763–1831), Canadian politician
- Michel Caron (Canadian singer) (born 1942), Canadian pop singer
- Michel Caron (tenor) (1929–2001), French opera singer

== See also ==
- Mike Carona (born 1955), a convicted felon and former Sheriff-Coroner of Orange County, California, U.S.
