= Ring-A-Ling =

Ring-A-Ling or Ring A Ling may refer to:

- "Ring A Ling" (Sneakbo song), 2013
- "Ring A Ling" (Tiggy song), 1996
- "Ring A Ling", a song by Carlo, 1964
- "Ring-A-Ling", a song by the Black Eyed Peas from The E.N.D., 2009
- "Ring A Ling", a song by Michel Caron, 1964
- "Ring-a-Ling", a song by Todrick Hall from Forbidden, 2018
- "Ring-a-Ling", a single by Tkay Maidza, 2023

== See also ==
- "Ring-a-ling-a-lario", a song by Jimmie Rodgers
- "Ring-a-Ling-a-Ling (Let the Wedding Bells Ring)", a song by the Isley Brothers from Shout!, 1959
