= Charron =

Charron may refer to:

== Places ==
=== Canada ===
- Charron Lake (Normandin River), Quebec

=== France ===
- Charron, Charente-Maritime, a commune of the Charente-Maritime département
- Charron, Creuse, a commune of the Creuse département

=== New Caledonia ===
- Ile Charron, an islet of New Caledonia in Mont-Dore

== Other ==
- Charron (automobile), a French car maker operating from 1907 to 1930
- Charron (surname)
- Charron (rapper) (born 1991), Canadian rapper

== See also ==
- Charon (disambiguation)
