= Chaeron =

Chaeron (Ancient Greek: Χαίρων)—also rendered Charon—was an ancient Greek male name. It may refer to:

- Chaeron, in Greek mythology, the son of Apollo and Thero
- Chaeron of Megalopolis, sent by Philip II of Macedon to consult the Delphic oracle about a snake from a peculiar dream
- Chaeron of Pellene, wrestler and tyrant
- Chaeron of Sparta, demagogue who served as tyrant of Sparta in 180 BC
