= Acacia nigripilosa =

Scientific classification
- Kingdom: Plantae
- Clade: Tracheophytes
- Clade: Angiosperms
- Clade: Eudicots
- Clade: Rosids
- Order: Fabales
- Family: Fabaceae
- Subfamily: Caesalpinioideae
- Clade: Mimosoid clade
- Genus: Acacia
- Species: A. nigripilosa

Binomial name
- Acacia nigripilosa Maiden
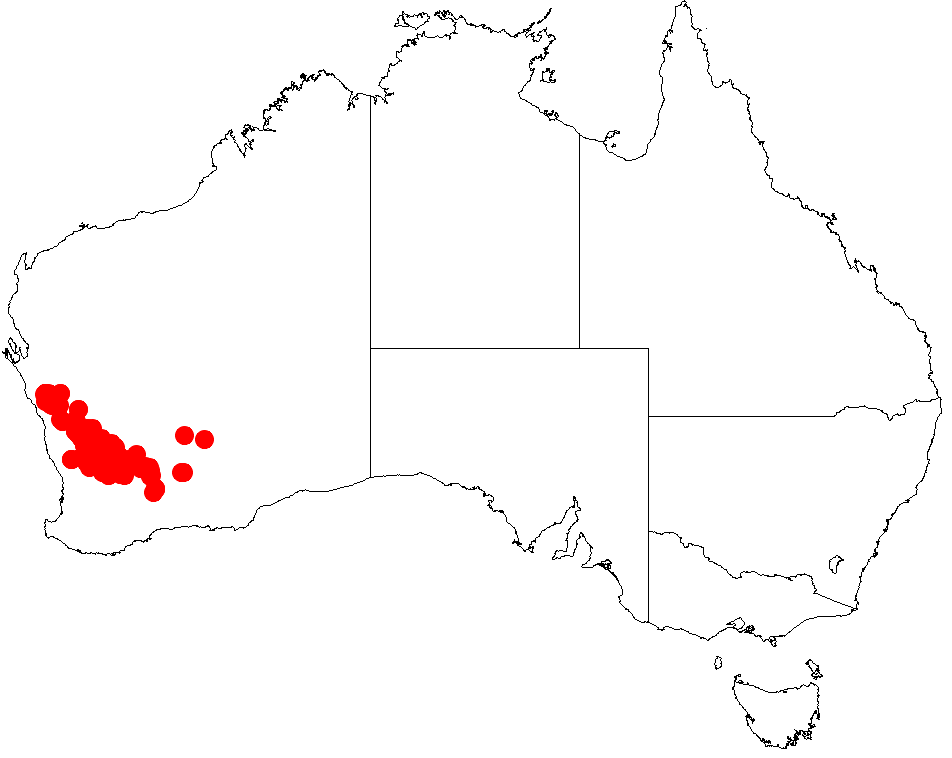
- Occurrence data from AVH

Synonyms
- Acacia nigripilosa Maiden orth. var.; Acacia nigripilosus Maiden orth. var.; Racosperma nigripilosum (Maiden) Pedley; Acacia inaequiloba auct. non W.Fitzg.: Maiden, J.H. (1917)

Species of legume

Acacia nigripilosa is a species of flowering plant in the family Fabaceae, and is endemic to the south-west of Western Australia. It is a shrub with glabrous branchlets, ascending to erect, linear to narrowly oblong or lance-shaped, flat to terete phyllodes, slightly oblong heads of golden yellow flowers and thinly leathery to crusty pods, more or less resembling a string of beads.

== Description ==
Acacia nigripilosa is a shrub that typically grows to a height of 0.5–2 m (1 ft 8 in – 6 ft 7 in) and has glabrous, ash-grey branchlets. Its phyllodes are usually ascending to erect dull, linear to narrowly oblong or lance-shaped with the narrower end towards the base, flat to terete, 20–70 mm (0.79–2.76 in) long, 1–8 mm (0.039–0.315 in) wide, more or less sharply pointed with four veins. There is a gland up to 4 mm (0.16 in) above the pulvinus. The flowers are borne in one or two slightly oblong heads in axils on glabrous peduncles usually 4–10 mm (0.16–0.39 in) long, each head with 18 to 34 golden yellow flowers. Flowering occurs from July to September, and the pods more or less resemble a string of beads, sometimes straight sided, 40–90 mm (1.6–3.5 in) long, 4–7 mm (0.16–0.28 in) wide and thinly leathery to crusty. The seeds are oblong to egg-shaped, about 4 mm (0.16 in) long and shiny dark brown with a thick aril.

== Taxonomy ==
Acacia nigripilosa was first formally described in 1920 by Joseph Maiden in the Journal and Proceedings of the Royal Society of New South Wales from specimens collected by Max Koch near Cowcowing. (The entry in the journal describes A. nigripilosus, but was corrected in the errata in the same journal to A. nigripilosa.) The specific epithet (nigripilosa) means 'black shaggy hairs', referring to the petals. In 1999, Bruce Maslin described two subspecies of A. nigripilosa, and the names are accepted by the Australian Plant Census:

- Acacia nigripilosa subsp. latifolia Maslin has phyllodes 20–35 mm (0.79–1.38 in) long, 5–8 mm (0.20–0.31 in) wide and normally dull and glaucous, abruptly narrowed at the tip to a straight, more or less sharply pointed tip.
- Acacia nigripilosa Maiden subsp. nigripilosa has phyllodes 25–70 mm (0.98–2.76 in) long, 1–5 mm (0.039–0.197 in) wide and somewhat shiny and green, gradually narrowed at the tip to a straight or delicately curved tip.

== Distribution and habitat ==
This species of wattle occurs from Yuna, south to near Goomalling and east to Mount Holland and near Queen Victoria Rock, where it is found in scrubland or open woodland, in the Avon Wheatbelt, Coolgardie, Geraldton Sandplains, Jarrah Forest, Mallee, Murchison and Yalgoo bioregions of south-western Western Australia.

- Subspecies latifolia is found between Caron, Maya and north east of Geraldton where it grows in yellow sand.
- Subspecies nigripilosa is found from Yuna, south to near Goomalling and east to Mount Holland and near Queen Victoria Rock, where it grows in sand or lateritic soils.

== Conservation status ==
Subspecies nigripilosa is listed as 'Not threatened', but subsp. latifolia is listed as 'Priority One' by the Government of Western Australia Department of Biodiversity, Conservation and Attractions, meaning that it is known from only one or a few locations where it is potentially at risk.

== See also ==
- List of Acacia species
