= Caron (disambiguation) =

Caron or háček, is a diacritic ( ˇ ).

Caron may also refer to:

== Places ==
- Caron, Saskatchewan, a hamlet in Saskatchewan, Canada
- Rural Municipality of Caron No. 162, a rural municipality in Saskatchewan, Canada
- Caron, Western Australia, a town in Australia

== Other uses ==
- Caron (name)
- Parfums Caron, a French perfume house established in 1904

== See also ==
- Carron (disambiguation)
- Charon (disambiguation)
- Karon (disambiguation)
