= Karon language (disambiguation) =

The Karon language is a language of Senegal and Gambia.

Karon language may also refer to:

- Karon Pantai language, or Abun, a language spoken on the north coast of West Papua
- Karon Dori language, spoken further inland from Karon Pantai and generally considered a dialect of Maybrat

== See also ==
- Karon (disambiguation)
