= List of State Register of Heritage Places in the Shire of Perenjori =

List of heritage sites in Western Australia

The State Register of Heritage Places is maintained by the Heritage Council of Western Australia. As of 2026, 47 places are heritage-listed in the Shire of Perenjori, of which three are on the State Register of Heritage Places.

== List ==
The Western Australian State Register of Heritage Places, as of 2026, lists the following three state registered places within the Shire of Perenjori:

Place name	Place #	Street number	Street name	Suburb or town	Co-ordinates	Notes & former names	Photo
St Joseph's Church, Perenjori	1936	Corner	Carnamah-Perenjori & Old Wells Roads	Perenjori	29.444208°S 116.287667°E	St Joseph's Catholic Church	
Bank of New South Wales (NSW) (former), Perenjori	1938	18	Fowler Street	Perenjori	29.442085°S 116.287576°E	Tourist Information Centre, Perenjori & Districts Pioneer Museum	
Caron Coal Stage	4562		Off Wubin-Mullewa Highway	Caron	29.579653°S 116.317766°E	Mechanical Coal Handling Plant	
