= Charun (disambiguation) =

Charun was a god in Etruscan mythology.

Charun may also refer to

Places

- Charun, Chitral, a village in Pakistan
- Charun, Iran

People

- Baljit Singh Charun (born 1986), hockey-player from Malaysia
- César Charún (born 1970), Peruvian footballer

Fictional Characters

- Charun Krojib, a character in Hiveswap

== See also ==
- Charon (disambiguation)
