= Charron (surname) =

Charron is a French occupational surname literally meaning "wheelwright". Notable people with the surname include:

- Corey Charron, winner of the 2013 106 & Park "Freestyle Friday" competition.
- Al Charron (born 1966), Canadian rugby union rugby player
- Claude Charron (born 1946), Canadian politician
- Craig Charron (1967–2010), American ice hockey player
- Éric Charron (born 1970), Canadian ice hockey player
- Fernand Charron (1866–1928), French racing driver
- Gene Charron (born 1942), American politician
- Guy Charron (born 1949), Canadian ice hockey player
- Joseph Charron (born 1939), American Catholic bishop
- Louise Charron (born 1951), Canadian jurist
- Pierre Charron (1541–1603), French philosopher
- Sanford E. Charron (1917–2008), American politician

== See also ==
- Charon (disambiguation)
