= Karon (name) =

Karon is both a given name and surname. Notable people with the name include:

- Karon O. Bowdre (born 1955), American judge
- Karon Prunty (born 2001), American football player
- Karon Riley (born 1978), American football player
- Jan Karon (born 1937), American writer
- Tony Karon, South African journalist

== See also ==
- Karon (disambiguation)
- Karol (name)
- KaRon Coleman (born 1976), American football player
