= Carron =

Carron may refer to:

== Rivers ==
- River Carron, Forth, a river in Central Scotland
- River Carron, Wester Ross
- River Carron, Sutherland
- Carron River (Queensland), a river in Australia
- Carron Water, Aberdeenshire, a river that flows into the North Sea in Stonehaven
- Carron Water, Dumfriesshire, a river that flows into the River Nith near Thornhill
- Loch Carron, a sea loch on the west coast of Ross and Cromarty in the Scottish Highlands

== Settlements ==
- Carron, Strathspey, a small village on the banks of the River Spey near Aberlour
- Carron, Falkirk, an area of Falkirk
- Carronbridge,
- Carron, County Clare, a small village in the heart of The Burren, County Clare, Ireland

== People ==
- Arthur Carron (1900-1967), British opera singer
- Julián Carrón (born 1950), Spanish Catholic priest
- Owen Carron (born 1953), Irish republican activist and politician
- Pernelle Carron (born 1986), French ice dancer
- Pierre Carron (1932–2022), French sculptor and painter
- Schuyler Carron (1921–1964), American bobsledder
- William Carron (1902–1969), British trade unionist and activist

== Other uses ==
- Carron Company, an ironworks dating from 1759 of significant historical importance.
- HMS Carron, several ships of the British Royal Navy
- Carron Primary School, a primary school situated in Carron

== See also ==
- Carlon
- Caron (disambiguation)
- Karron (disambiguation)
