= Karon =

Karon may refer to:

- Karon (name) (includes a list of people with the name)
- Karon language, a language of Senegal and Gambia
- Karon Pantai language, or Abun, a language spoken on the north coast of West Papua
- Karon Dori language, a language of West Papua, spoken further inland from Karon Pantai and generally considered a dialect of Maybrat
- Karon Beach, a beach and town in Phuket, Thailand
- Karon, Deoghar, a community development block in Jharkhand, India
- Karon, Deoghar (village), a village in Jharkhand, India

== See also ==
- Caron (disambiguation)
