= Francine Caron =

French writer and poet

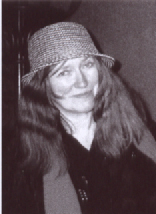

Francine Caron (born 18 September 1945 in Batz-sur-Mer) is a French writer and poet.

== Life ==
Caron studied at the Lycée Joachim du Bellay, Angers, Liceo Frances (French High School), Madrid, and Faculty of Letters at the University of Poitiers – Diplome d'études superieures, 1966, Agrégation in Spanish language and literature, 1967

=== Academic career ===
- Teacher at the Lycée du Bellay, Angers, 1967–68
- At the University of Haute-Bretagne-Rennes II: Assistante, 1969; Maitre-Assistante, 1974; Maitre de conferences, 1985
- Lecturer in French poetry at the Centre de Recherches en literature et linguistique de l'Anjou (CRLLAB) beginning in 1978; research associate, 1991
- Since 1999, F.C. is supervising the collection of her works in the archives of contemporary poetry at the University of Angers.

=== Poetic career ===
- She began writing since 1965
- Known as published poet since 1975 (articles in "Le Journal des Poètes" -Brussels- and in "Insula" -Madrid-)
- Founder and editor of the quarterly poetry review Nard that published 375 poets between 1974 and 1981 and more poets between 2003 and 2005
- Founding member of the journal Phreatique, 1977; of the Angevin Society of Poets, 1982; and of Transparleurs, 2004
- Contributor to more than 100 poetry journals since 1974
- She has published poems in many Anthologies. Some are best known in Paris: Ellipses, Hermann, La Table Ronde, Nil or Seghers editions, etc.
- Member of prize juries for:
  - La Rose d'or of Doué-la-Fontaine, 1975–95
  - Centre Froissart de Valenciennes
  - The Grand Prix de la Ville d'Angers, 1982–2000
  - The Ville de la Baule, since 2000

== Publications ==
Her publications, some under the pseudonym Francile Caron, include more than sixty books, including collector's editions translated into seven European languages (English by the American poet Basia Miller) and Arabic and Hebrew:

- Orphée sauvage, 1973
- En vers et pour tous and Amour ephemeride, Chambelland, Paris, 1974
- Les Corps sourciers, Millas-Martin, Paris, 1975
- Le Paradis terrestre, Froissart, 1976, Centre Froissart prize, 1976
- Femme majeure, Millas-Martin, Paris, François Villon prize, 1977
- Espagne veuve and Cathedres, 1977
- L'Année d'amour, 1979
- Quinze Ans de poésie and Picardie-Poesie, 1981
- D’Islande, 1982
- Musée du Louvre, 1984
- Bretagne au cœur, Osiris, Paris 1985; liminar poem by Eugene Guillevic
- Terres celtes, 1986
- L'Amour le feu, Eklitra, 1991
- Lecture-poem 1992: D'Europe, Presses de l'universite d'Angers, 1993
- Maldives, 1997
- Étreinte-Éternité, Alain Benoit (ou AB éditions), 1998, illustrations de Monique Tonet (2d ed. 2000)
- Sur sept tableaux de Caillaud d'Angers, Voyage autour du monde en poésie and Norway, chemins du Nord, 1999
- Ars Amandi, MéluZine, Égyptiennes, Femme à l'oiseau and Petit guide du square des Batignolles, 2000
- Tanka du cloître angevin, 2001
- Macrocosme du corps humain sous le regard d'1 microscope électronique, 2002
- Planète foot/ War Planet, 2004
- Erotica tumescens and Mortes saisons, haïku(s), 2005
- Ciel-Symphonie and Parcs et Lunaparks de Paris, with a postface by Jean-Pierre Desthuilliers, 2006
- Nuit Cap Nord, Venise avec le temps, Jardin de simples and Shoah, 2007
- Sphinx / Sphinge and Arbres (z) Amants, 2008
- Atlantiques, Cantate pour le Grand Canyon and Goya, Goya!, 2009
- Haïkus des doudous, Orphee naguere, Grand Louvre, Bleu Ciel d'Europe, Entre deux Rembrandt(s), and Antre de Rembrandt, 2010
- Taj Mahal and Géométrie(s) du Chat, haïku, 2011
- Riches heures du sexe amoureux, 2012
- Stances à Felix and Âmes animales, 2013
- Ämes animales, Edition Voix Tissées, préface de Silvaine Arabo et postface de Guy Chaty + illustrations d'Anne Gary, collection Coup du coeur du n°20, 2013
- Mère à jamais, ABéditions (soit Alain Benoit éditeur), 2014, illustrations d'André Liberati.
- Autres me/moi\res, ABéditions, 2015, illustrations d'André Liberati.
- Paris par ici, cartes de "haîkus-bulles" en portfolio, éd. Donner à voir 2016, ill. d'Anja Hagemann.
- Vissi d'arte Vissi d'amor, éd. D'Ici et D'AilleurS, collection "Poètes intuitistes", 2017
- Femmage(s). Au nom de celles qui..., ABéditions, 2018, illustrations de Pierre Cayol.
- Bibliophilie jubilatoire bilingue (dit Biblio Jubil), éditions Voix Tissées - synthèse de 50 ans en poésie: 12 poèmes traduits par B. Miller et illustrés par 8 artistes de Baumel à Mihuléac, 2018.
- Les deux livres suivants sont des éditions courantes de deux ouvrages de bibliophilie parus aux Éditions Transignum, Paris (cf. Livres de bibliophilie).
- Islande – Éclats de nuit Hekla, fin 2014. Reproduction de 5 gravures sur bois par Chantal Denis + traduction anglaise par Basia Miller. 50 ex, format 15 x 15.
- Ma(t)in – Jardin d'Eden, 2015. Un poème inspiré par les neuf dessins reproduits de Martine Chittofrati. Traductions anglaise de B. Miller et italienne de Davide Napoli (+ F. Caron). 100 exemplaires clos par un lacet, numérotés et signés sur papier vélin.
- La Mandorle, ABéditions à Rochefort-du-Gard, avril 2019, illustrations de Cayol.
- Pleines Marées, nov. 2019. Sur 10 poèmes fc: 10 images de Sarah Wiame à ses éd. Céphéides (Paris). Chacun des 20 exemplaires est rehaussé d'un collage original (cf. Livres de bibliophilie).
- Nues de la mer, éditions Eva Largo à Vincennes, 2020. Images d'Olga Verme-Mignot.
- Shoah, épuisé, reparaît en 2021 en 2e édition revue et complétée par la traduction de Basia Miller (cf. Livres de bibliophilie).
- Éternel(s) retour(s), édition définitive de cette synthèse 1965 - 2019 chez AB, Rochefort du Gard (Fusains d'Alain Benoit), 2022

== Special issues of journal ==
- L'Oreillette, no. 35: F. Caron I, Parler la vie (1965–1985), 2001
- L'Oreillette, no. 37: F. Caron II (1985–1997), 2002
- Nard, no. 29: F. Caron III, Chroniques de renaissance (1997–2003), 2003
- Poésie/premiere no. 48: F.C. de l'Amour a l'Humour, 2010, a study by Guy Chaty

== Translations ==
- Translations of contemporary Spanish drama, including La Camisa by Lauro Olmo performed at "la Comédie de Saint-Etienne-Jean Dasté"
- Translations of her friend, the American poet Basia Miller (her last book is ″WALKING in the DAYLIGHT″)

== Honours ==
- Prix de la Rose d'or de Doué-la-Fontaine, 1974
- Prix du Centre Froissart de Valenciennes, 1975
- Prix François Villon, 1977
- Grand Prix of the Ville de La Baule, 1997
- BATZ s/Mer, 2019-25-V. The mediatheque of her birth city chose her name

== Memberships ==
- P.E.N. Club
- Sociétaire of the Societé des gens de lettres and of Ecrivains Bretons
- Member of: Arts et Jalons, Cercle Alienor J. Krafft, Poésie-sur-Seine, Donner à voir, Femmes poésie et liberté, Transignum and Rencontres européennes
