= Chaeron of Pellene =

4th-century BC wrestler and tyrant of Pellene

Chaeron (Ancient Greek: Χαίρων) was a wrestler and tyrant from Pellene, ancient Achaea.

Chaeron won at the Isthmian Games, possibly twice, and four times at the Ancient Olympic Games, between 356 BC and 344 BC. Alexander the Great made him tyrant of Pellene. It is said that the people of Pellene refused to even mention Chaeron by his name. He may be the same person as Chaeron of Megalopolis.

He was believed to have exiled the aristocrats of Pellene and given their wives and property to their slaves, perhaps because of his study of Plato and Xenocrates.

Athenaeus states

And such now are some of the Academics, who live in a scandalous and infamous manner. For they, having by impious and unnatural means acquired vast wealth by trickery, are at present highly thought of; as Chaeron of Pellene, who was not only a pupil of Plato, but of Xenocrates also. And he too, having usurped the supreme power in his country, and having exercised it with great severity, not only banished the most virtuous men in the city, but also gave the property of the masters to their slaves, and gave their wives also to them, compelling them to receive them as their husbands; having got all these admirable ideas from that excellent Republic and those illegal Laws of Plato.
