= Kevin Caron =

American sculptor

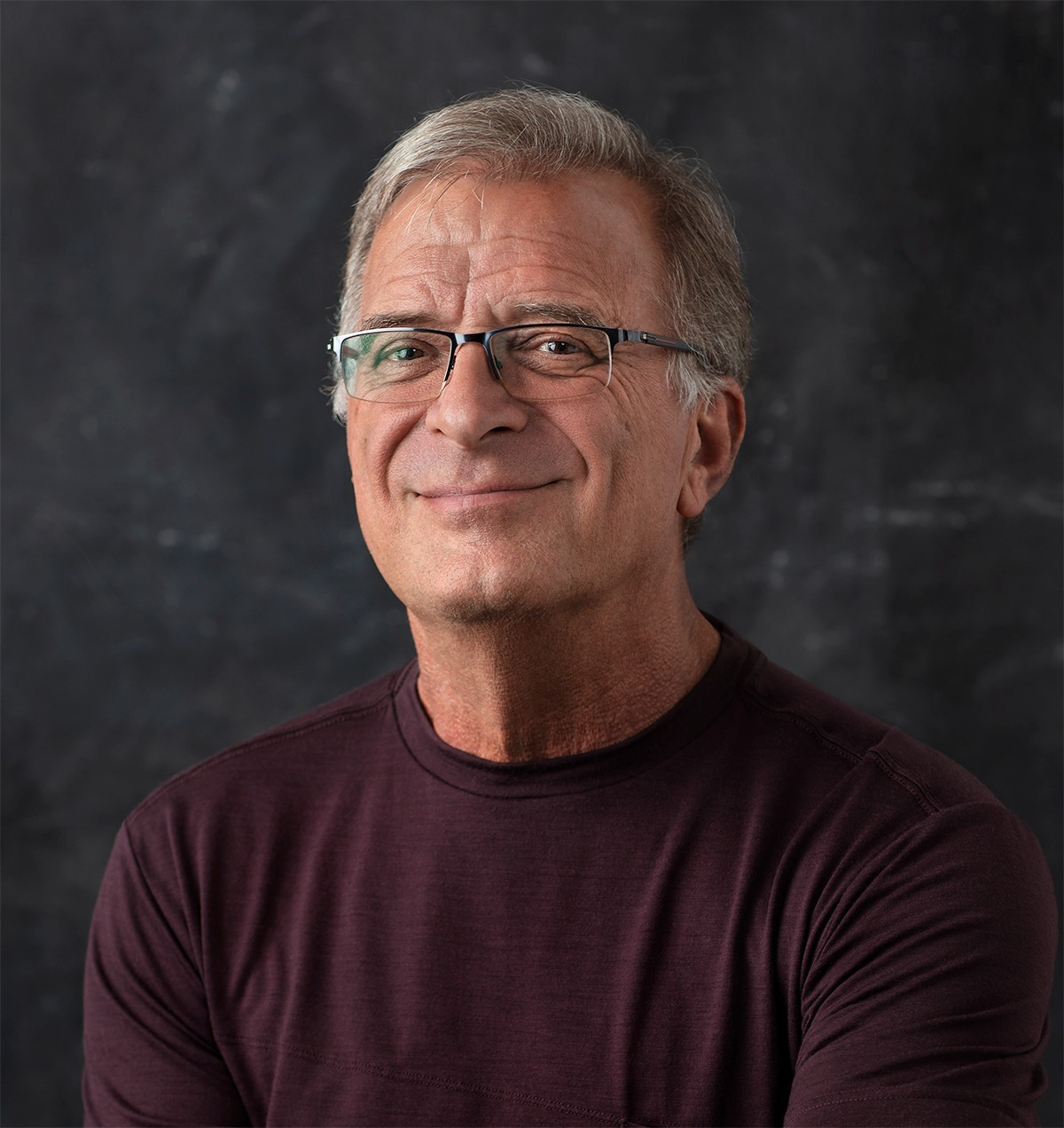
- Born: Kevin Caron; 1960 (age 65–66); Stratford, Connecticut
- Known for: Sculpture
- Awards: Visual Artist of the Year, 2018 Phoenix Mayor's Arts Awards, Best of the West Arts & Culture Award; Sculptor of the Year, ArtTrends magazine, 2012-2014
- Patrons: Heritage Guild of Vicksburg and Warren, Vicksburg, Mississippi; City of Chandler, Arizona; City of Avondale, Arizona; City of Tucson, Arizona; City of Chandler, Arizona; City of Surprise, Arizona; City of Temple, Texas; Harbourside Place, Jupiter, Florida; Whitaker Center for Science and the Arts, Harrisburg, Pennsylvania

Kevin Caron (born February 2, 1960, in Stratford, Connecticut) is a sculptor from Phoenix, Arizona. He has created more than 60 private and public commissioned works which are on display across the United States and the world. Among his works are pieces on display in Vicksburg, Mississippi, Tucson, Arizona, Temple, Texas, Avondale, Arizona, Chandler, Arizona, Surprise, Arizona, Jupiter, Florida and Harrisburg, Pennsylvania as well as in Taiwan, Luxembourg and the Bahamas. He was chosen as Visual Artist of the Year in the 2018 Phoenix Mayor's Arts Awards, and his public art sculpture Hands On won 17th Annual Best of the West Arts & Culture Award for 2009. Caron is perhaps best known for his public art sculpture Top Knot (below, right), a commission for the city of Surprise, Arizona.

Although he began his work as an artist working in fabricated steel, Caron is also a pioneer in using 3D printing to create large scale 3D printed sculpture, using an 8-foot-tall Cerberus 3D Gigante 3D printer that he had built for him. His largest 3D-printed sculpture to date is Debutante, a more than 6-foot-tall outdoor sculpture. A 5-1/2-foot-tall sculpture, Epic Swoon, was commissioned by PricewaterhouseCoopers in Columbus, Ohio.

== Life and career ==
Caron was born on February 2, 1960. He moved to Arizona with his family in 1973. He served six years in the United States Navy, where he worked in machine shops, and aircraft maintenance yards. He was stationed in various ports of call including Diego Garcia and Misawa, Japan. He was honorably discharged in 1983.

He managed a car repair shop, and in between jobs, built his own vehicle. His career as a sculptor was inspired by his work on a privacy screen. When he had completed the screen, he visualized a fountain made from the same material. Caron became a full-time artist in 2006.

As he launched his art career, he also began a YouTube channel. By July 2024, the channel had more than 800 videos, 103,000 subscribers and 29 million views.

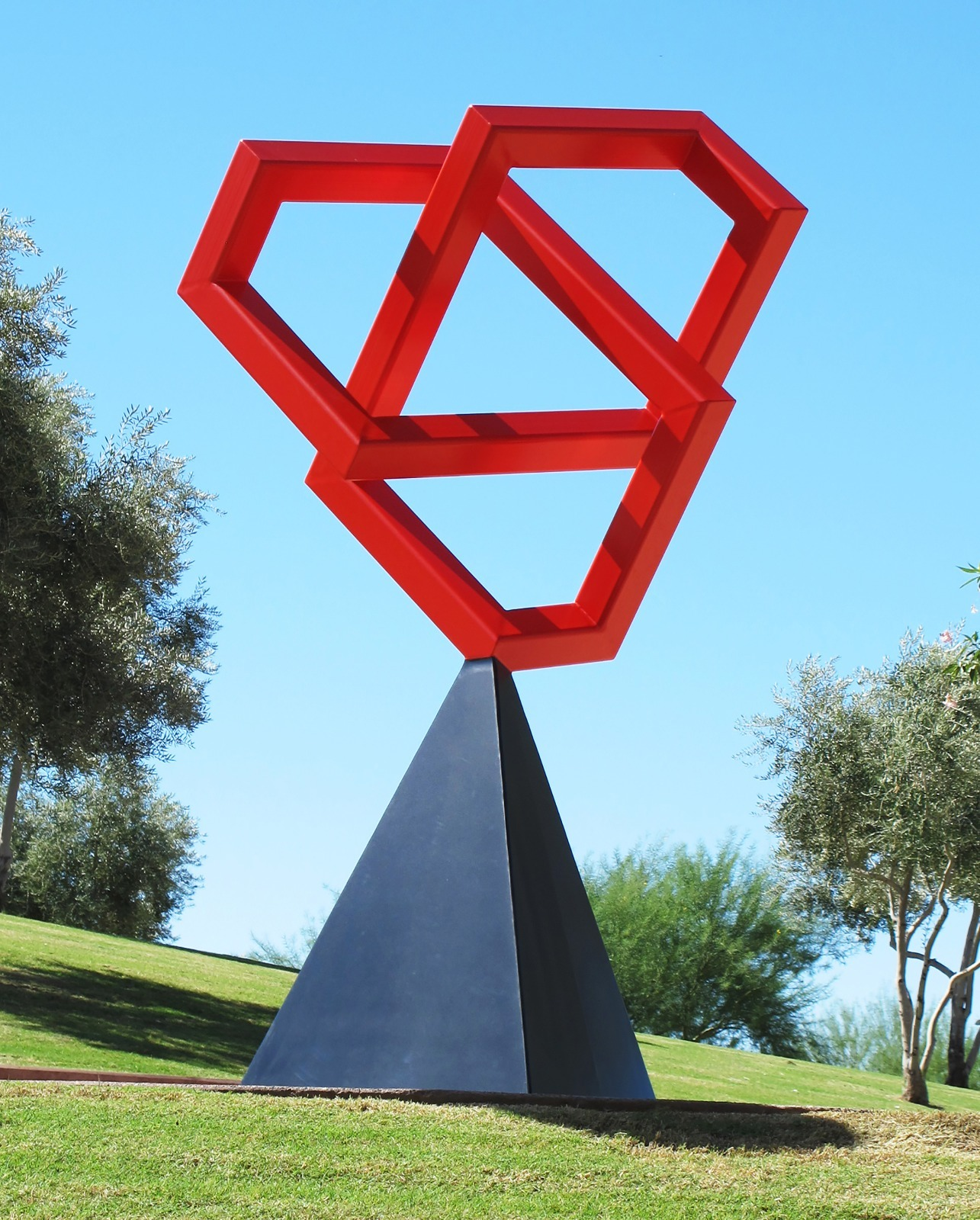

He lists M.C. Escher and Antoine Pevsner among his design inspirations.

In 2012, in addition to creating metal artworks, he began working with 3D printing and now creates sculptures as tall as 6 feet using his 8-foot-tall Cerberus 3D Gigante printer.

== Awards ==
- 2024 Aedra Fine Arts North Side Catalogue, best in show grand prizes
- 2018 Visual Artist of the Year, Phoenix Mayor's Arts Awards
- 2014 Sculptor of the Year, ArtTrends magazine
- 2013 Sculptor of the Year, ArtTrends magazine
- 2012 Sculptor of the Year, ArtTrends magazine
- 2009 17th Annual Best of the West Arts & Culture Award, Westmarc, West Valley, Arizona
- 2008 Juried member, Arizona Artists Guild, Phoenix, Arizona

== Public and major commissions and installations ==
- 2026 Vicksburg, Mississippi; City of Vicksburg, Mississippi: In the Key of Freedom. Powder-coated aluminum and steel, 111″ x 50″ x 10″
- 2020 Chandler, Arizona, Banner Ocotillo Medical Center: Ovation. Oxidized and powder-coated steel, 94" x 27" x 22"
- 2020 Piggot, Arkansas, Mathilda & Karl Pfeiffer Museum and Study Center, Stepping Out. Oxidized steel, 78" x 5" x 18"
- 2018 Tempe, Arizona, Sterling 920 Terrace Apartment Complex: Cosmography. Powder-coated steel, 109" x 70" x 70"
- 2016 Surprise, Arizona, City of Surprise City Hall Complex: Top Knot. Powder-coated steel, 108" x 56" x 56"
- 2015 Harrisburg, Pennsylvania, Whitaker Center for Science and the Arts: Wherever You Go, There You Are. Steel, 108" x 120" x 26"
- 2014 Jupiter, Florida, Harbourside Place: Giant Street Urchin. Powder-coated steel, 60" x 75" x 75"
- 2012 Chandler, Arizona, City of Chandler: The Seed. Powder-coated steel, 168" x 76" x 83"
- 2012 Tucson, Arizona, Pima Community College East Campus: Wherever You Go, There You Are. Steel, 96" x 96" x 24"
- 2009 Avondale, Arizona, City of Avondale: Hands On. Steel, powder-coated steel, 168" x 145" x 146"
- 2007 Avondale, Arizona, Rancho Santa Fe Elementary School: Bronco Brand Birch. Steel, 84" x 42" x 42"
- 2007 Litchfield Park, Arizona, Litchfield Park Elementary School: Mighty Owl Oak. Steel, copper, 109" x 94" x 169"
- 2007 Temple, Texas, City of Temple: Temple Falls. powder-coated steel, 48" x 27" x 32"
- 2006 Tucson, Arizona, City of Tucson: Xhilaration. Steel, 92" x 41" x 68"

== Reviews and commentary ==
- Rhoades, Rebecca. "Journey of Imagination," Phoenix Home & Garden (January 2019), p. 102-109.
- ABC News. "The Real Rookies," ABC 20/20 (September 15, 2018), national network special.
- Spanos, Litsa. "The Secrets of the Art World" (book), Blink Art Resource Press (2017) p. 224 – 227.
- Dishner, Jackie. "Art Break: 3D Printing with Kevin Caron," Phoenix magazine (March 2017) p. 41.
- Richman, Gabby. "Kevin Caron: The Accidental Artist." So Scottsdale (magazine) (February 2014)
- D'Andrea, Niki. "Kevin Caron: Large Scale Sculptor," Phoenix magazine (January 2014)
