= Liina Karron =

Estonian chef (born 1974)

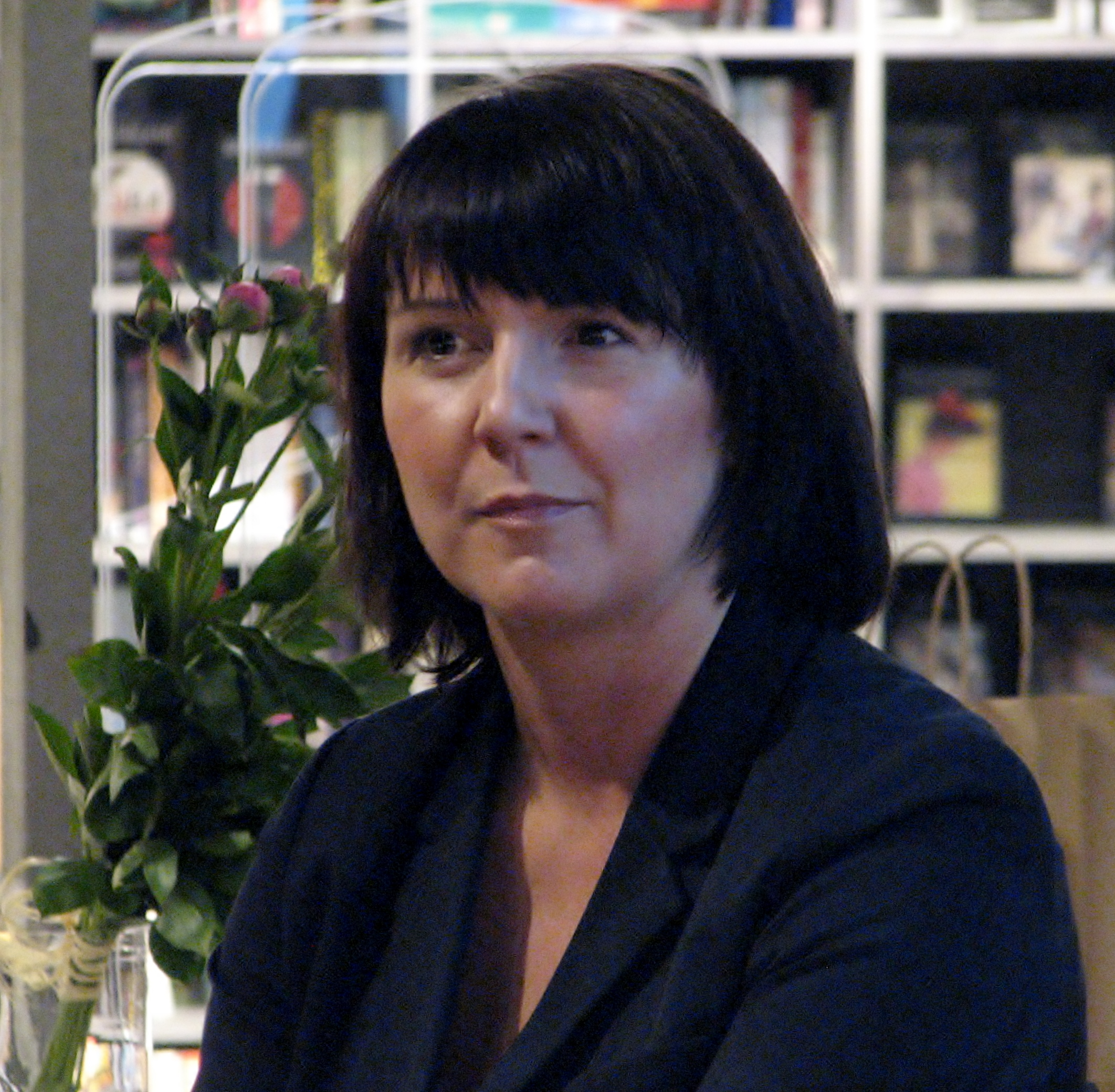
- Liina Karron presenting her book "Let's Eat Fish!" at the Apollo of the Solaris Center
- Born: 8 August 1974 (age 51)

Liina Karron (born 8 August 1974) is an Estonian food writer, chef, manager and marketer.

== Biography ==
Karron is a cook by profession. As a television chef she has prepared dishes on such programmes as "Terevisiooni". She has worked as CEO of Sadama Turu, Sales Director of SEB, and Development Manager of Prisma Konto. In her books she has written on recipes of plant-based dishes.

== Bibliography ==
- Let's Eat Grass: Food from the Forest and the Sea
- Let's Eat Fish
- Let's Eat Meat
