= Ruth Karron =

- Education: New York University
- Scientific career
- Fields: Pediatric infectious diseases, international health
- Workplaces: Johns Hopkins University

Ruth Aviva Karron is an American pediatric infectious diseases physician working as a professor of international health and director of the Johns Hopkins Vaccine Initiative the Johns Hopkins Bloomberg School of Public Health.

== Life ==
Karron earned a M.D. at the New York University Grossman School of Medicine in 1982. She completed a residency in pediatrics at Children's National Hospital in 1985 followed by a pediatric infectious disease fellowship at the Johns Hopkins School of Medicine in 1989. In 1988 she board certified in pediatrics through the American Board of Pediatrics.

Karron is a professor of international health in the global disease epidemiology and control division and director of the Johns Hopkins Vaccine Initiative at the Johns Hopkins Bloomberg School of Public Health. Her research interests include disease control at the Johns Hopkins Center for Immunization Research, vaccine development, respiratory viruses, influenza, respiratory syncytial virus, parainfluenza, immunity, and vaccine ethics. In 2026, Karron was elected a member of the National Academy of Medicine.
