= Marie-Josèphe Caron =

French-born Spanish artist (1725–1824)

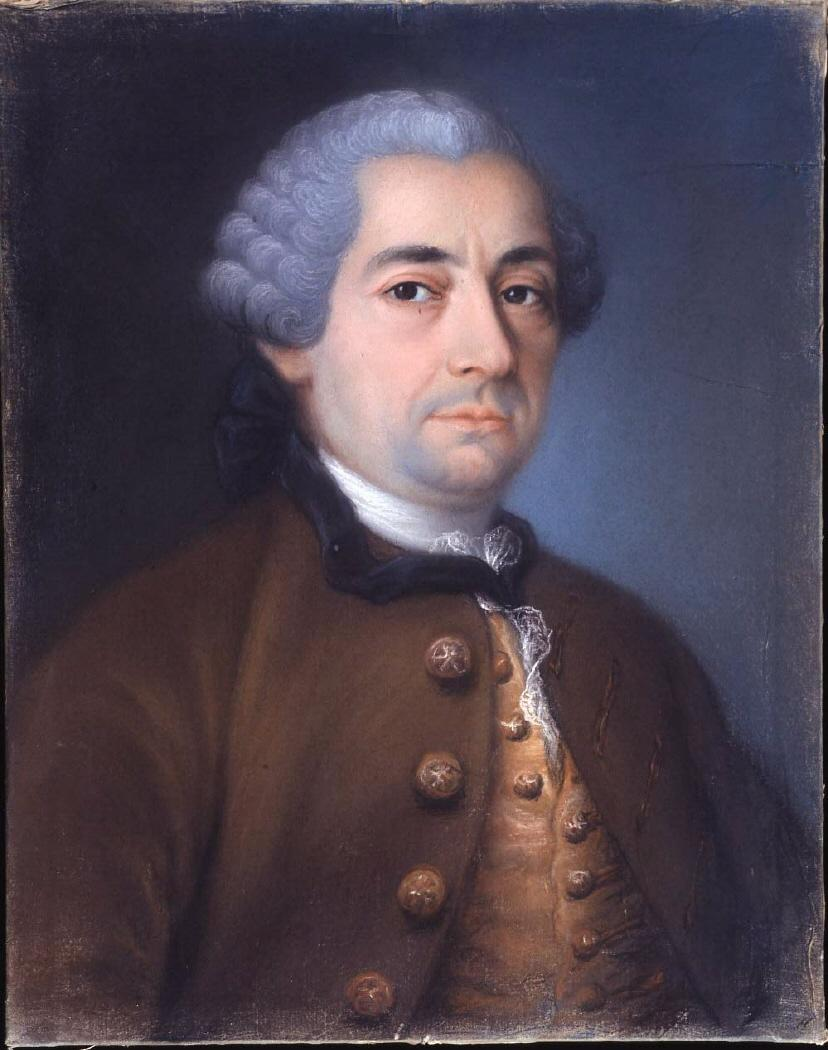
Portrait of Diego de Villanueva, 1761

Marie-Josèphe Caron, called in Spanish Doña María Josefa Carrón (baptized 13 January 1725; died 21 December 1784) was a French artist active in Spain.

== Biography ==
Born in Paris, Caron was one of the five sisters of Pierre Beaumarchais, born to watchmaker André-Charles Caron; their cousin was the artist Suzanne Caron. At her baptism at the Église des Saints-Innocents her godmother was listed as Jeanne-Josèphe de La Borde. On 27 November 1748, at Saint-Jacques-de-la-Boucherie, she married one Louis Guillebert, possibly Guilbert (1717–1772) a maître maçon who was soon appointed architect to the king of Spain, whereupon the couple settled in Madrid. Accompanying them was her younger sister, Marie-Louise, called Lisette, whose involvement with a Spanish official, José Clavijo y Fajardo, led the playwright to make a 1764 trip to rescue her honor, a story which later inspired the play Clavigo by Goethe.

In Madrid, Marie-Josèphe established a fashion shop; her husband, meanwhile, lost his reason and died. In 1770 she sent a letter of application to the Académie de peinture et de sculpture in Marseille; later that same year she repeated her request. Early in 1771 she received a favorable response, pending submission of an artwork as part of the application. In May 1771 she was at Toulon, from where she wrote to thank the Académie; soon thereafter she apologized for the delay in sending the required artwork, attributing it to the death of her husband and to a serious illness on her part. She was recovered enough by that December to submit her work, a portrait of a Marseillais lieutenant-colonel, which she sent from Madrid. In 1772 she returned to Paris where, without funds, she relied upon her brother's financial support until her death. Spanish sources claim she died in Madrid in 1823, but this is incorrect. A 1761 portrait in pastel of the architect Diego de Villanueva is in the collection of the Real Academia de Bellas Artes de San Fernando.
