= Marc G. Caron =

American neuroscientist (1946–2022)

- Born: July 26, 1946; L'Islet, Quebec, Canada
- Died: April 25, 2022 (aged 75); Hillsborough, North Carolina, U.S.
- Scientific career
- Institutions: Duke University

Marc G. Caron (July 26, 1946 – April 25, 2022) was a Canadian-born American researcher and James B. Duke Professor of Cell Biology at Duke University. He was one of the top highly cited researchers (h>100) according to webometrics.

Caron died on April 25, 2022, aged 75.
