= Jean-Luc Caron =

French physician and musicologist

Jean-Luc Caron (born 4 December 1948 in Paris) is a French physician and musicologist.

== Biography ==
Caron is a doctor of medicine, founding president of the French Association Carl Nielsen, editor of the association's newsletter, author of essays, news, aphorisms and novels. He has specialized in the study and dissemination of North-European music which he regularly tries to present in articles, chronicles, monographs, lectures, radio programs and to place in its Nordic and international historical and aesthetic context. He is the author of a book on Carl Nielsen, as well as a book on Jean Sibelius, both published by L'Age d'Homme editions.

Caron contributed to the establishment of the "ResMusica" website, specializing in classical music and dance.

== Selected bibliography ==
- 1989: Allan Pettersson, destin, douleur et musique, la vie et l'œuvre, 2009 (2nd edition)
- 1990: Carl Nielsen, Editions l'Age d'Homme, Lausanne, 500 pages.
- 1991: Grands symphonistes nordiques méconnus, Bulletin de l'Association française Carl Nielsen
- 1992: Kajanus and Wegelius, Bulletin de l'Association française Carl Nielsen
- 1992: Catalogue des principales œuvres instrumentales de Sibelius, Bulletin de l'Association française Carl Nielsen
- 1994: Edvard Grieg et Paris, Association française Carl Nielsen
- 1995: Petite histoire de la musique nordique à Paris, 1910–1953, Bulletin de l'Association française Carl Nielsen
- 1997: Jean Sibelius, Editions l'Age d'Homme, Paris, ISBN 2-8251-0798-0
- 2003: Edvard Grieg, le Chopin du Nord, la vie et l'œuvre, Lausanne, l'Age d'Homme, ISBN 2-8251-1741-2
- 2013: Jean-Luc Caron, Gérard Denizeau, Camille Saint-Saëns, Paris, Bleu Nuit, ISBN 978-2-35884-027-9
- 2015: Carl Nielsen, Paris, Bleu Nuit, 178 pages.
