= Estelle Caron =

Canadian singer and comic

- Born: December 30, 1926; Hull, Quebec, Canada
- Died: April 20, 2010 (aged 83) Montreal, Quebec, Canada
- Occupations: Singer; comedian
- Formerly of: Les Joyeux Troubadours

Estelle Caron (December 30, 1926 – April 20, 2010) was a Canadian singer and comedian.

Caron was born in Hull, Quebec, on December 30, 1926. She was a member of Montreal-based Les Joyeux Troubadours, a half-hour comedic song and skit program on Radio-Canada, which aired at noon five days a week. Caron performed on the show from 1951 to the show's end in 1977. Despite her radio popularity, she failed to find success as a recording artist or television personality. Caron retired after the end of the radio show and died in Montreal on April 20, 2010. She was preceded by her husband, pianist Jean Larose, with whom she had two children.

== Select recordings ==
- "Je veux savoir (Teach Me Tonight)" (in French). Meteor. 1956.
- "Si je vous donnais mon coeur (If I Give My Heart To You)" (in French). Meteor. 1956.
- Estelle Caron Chante Noel (in French). Musirack Inc. 1962.
