= Gérard Caron =

French designer (1938–2020)

- Born: 30 August 1938; Pont-l'Évêque, France
- Died: 31 October 2020 (aged 82); Neuilly-sur-Seine, France
- Occupation: Designer

Gérard Caron (30 August 1938 – 31 October 2020) was a French designer. He was the co-founder of Carré Noir, the very first French design marketing agency, making him one of the inventors of the concept of brand design in France. He also contributed to the development of French design marketing overseas, in Japan as well as in other countries around the world. Gérard Caron, who was the author of several books on design as a professional activity, and the creator of a website dedicated to design, regularly gave lectures on this topic.

== Early life and education ==
Gérard Caron was born in Pont l'Evêque, Normandy, France, into a family of seven children, just before the outbreak of the Second World War. Nothing in his family background (his father was a telephone inspector and his mother a seamstress) seemed to destine him for a career in design. In the long periods of shortages brought about by the war, Gérard Caron invented games, made products using flour, potatoes, sugar, water, or cider as his basic ingredients, created makeshift packaging and dreamt up advertising slogans and sold them to his brothers and sisters. Without realizing it, he had started creating his first packaging materials and logos. Gérard Caron was twenty when war was declared in Algeria. For twenty-eight months, he did his military service in the Engineers where he happened to read an article about jobs in advertising. It came as a revelation. With his heart set on working in this industry, he decided to take correspondence courses. When he was demobilized, he continued studying at the Ecole Supérieure de la Communication in Paris from which he graduated top of his class. To pay for his studies, he worked simultaneously in a bank. Later on, he would also study distribution, graphology, and psychology.

== Career ==
Caron began his long life in advertising with Publicis in 1962, where he acquired his first professional experience. He developed his career working successively for SNIP (which subsequently became BDDP), Young & Rubicam, and Ted Bates. He spent considerable time in companies such as Brandt and Cotelle Lesieur, where he worked on the celebrated plastic Lacroix bleach bottle in 1964 with Raymond Loewy. This was his first professional contact with design and was to have an immense influence on his subsequent career. Later on, Gérard Caron studied and developed theories about design based on handwriting, heraldry, symbolism, and relaxation therapy with his partner Michel Disle.

In 1973, he founded Carré Noir, la première agence de design-marketing en France, the first design marketing agency to be set up in France, with three professionals from the Ted Bates agency: the architect Michel Alizard, the artistic director Michel Disle, and the designer Jean Perret. The square of the logo symbolizes the friendship of the four partners and the black color represents the pencil stroke of the creative designer on the sheet of white paper. They decided to call their new business a "design agency". At that time, the word ‘design’ conjured up images of Scandinavian furniture and had not yet become part of the advertising lexicon. Gérard Caron and his associates are considered to be the inventors of communication design in France. Gérard Caron went on to set up subsidiaries of Carré Noir around the world, in the United States, Japan, Italy, Belgium and England. He also prepared the launch of the agency in Germany, Poland and Hong Kong before leaving the business in 1998.

In all, Gérard Caron created nearly 13,000 packaging designs with his teams (for brands such as Carrefour, Biotherm, Lancôme, etc.), 1,200 visual identities (including logos for Lotus, Le Bon Marché or the RPR political party and the emblem used by former French president François Mitterrand) and 90 new chain store concepts (for Yves Rocher, Loisirs & Création or Auchan).

The career pursued by Caron and his extensive research on symbolic systems, colours, and the memorization of signs led him to work with artists, scientists, psychiatrists, business leaders, and politicians and to write a large number of books in which he developed his thoughts about design. In 2003, he founded and became editor of Admirable Design, a weekly online magazine devoted to news about design and related markets. Gérard Caron shared his knowledge and expertise in France and around the world as a consultant for design agencies and business organizations, and gave many lectures in Japan and throughout Europe.

=== Key dates ===
1973: Creation of the first design marketing agency in France: Carré Noir. He served as the agency's chairman until 1998.

1990: Gérard Caron founded the Enseigne d’Or with Alain Boutigny, an annual award presented to architects and advertisers/distributors for their achievements and innovations. Every year, the prize-giving ceremony is attended by between 1,000 and 1,500 professionals at the Marigny theatre in Paris.

1992: Release of Un Carré Noir Dans Le Design ("A Black Square In Design", a book published by Dunod), the first popular French publication devoted to the design profession that reveals the secrets of how products, objects and images come into being. It has been translated into Japanese.

1993: He created the Paneuropean Design Association with a number of European designers. This association, composed of European design agencies, was the first inter-professional association of design agencies. It blazed the trail for many other professional associations that helped to build the European Economic Union. He was appointed chairman of the association.

1997: Gérard Caron was chosen by the Frankfurt-based European Monetary Institute to represent France in order to choose the model of the euro banknotes.

1998: Gérard Caron launched the Mouvement Française du Monde with French Senator Hubert Durand Chastel. The goal pursued by this democratic association of French expatriates is to bring together French citizens wanting to remain in touch with cultural, political, economic and social developments in France while simultaneously deepening their relationship with their host country.

1999-2003: With Carole Réfabert, Gérard Caron founded Scopes, a company specializing in forward-looking analyses of consumer trends and contemporary expectations. Scopes uses images to study worldwide consumption trends through a network based in eight major cities worldwide: Tokyo, New York, Los Angeles, Berlin, London, Milan, Paris, and Sydney. The company is composed chiefly of photographers, designers and journalists.

2002: Gérard Caron became a columnist contributing to the Eco matin programme, broadcast on France 5.

2003: He founded Admirable Design, an online magazine dedicated to design in all its forms. Aimed at both professionals and students, it is currently the professional design website attracting the largest number of visitors.

2004: Gérard Caron created Design Communication Corporation, a consultancy specializing in design and brand strategy. He also launched Caron Design Network, a professional network set up between the Japanese market and French design agencies.

2007: Gérard Caron was appointed chairman of the Pentawards jury, the international prize for packaging design founded by Brigitte and Jean-Jacques Evrard. He served as the chairman of the jury every year, until his death.

Caron died on 31 October 2020, aged 82.
