= Maxence Caron =

French writer and philosopher (born 1976)

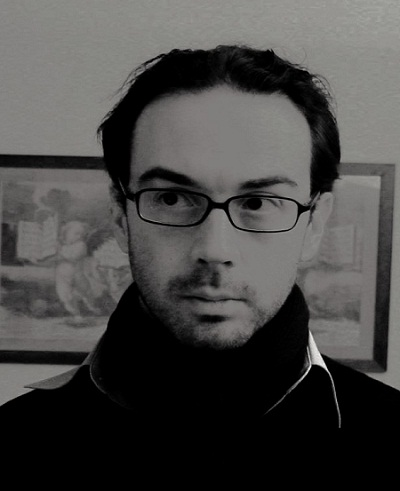
- Maxence Caron
- Born: 1976 (age 49–50); Marseille, France
- Occupations: Writer, poet, philosopher, musicologist
- Writing career
- Subjects: Literature, Philosophy, poetry, Theology Classical Music, History of Philosophy
- Notable awards: Prix Biguet
- Website: maxencecaron.fr

Maxence Caron (born 1976) is a French writer, poet, philosopher and musicologist.

== Biography ==
He is agrégé in Philosophy (in 1999), Docteur ès lettres (at Sorbonne in 2003 with Rémi Brague as a thesis director. Director at the Publishing firm les Éditions du Cerf, he manages the collection Les Cahiers d'Histoire de la Philosophie ("The History Notebooks of Philosophy") that he has founded, and to which Jean-Luc Marion, Rémi Brague, Joseph Ratzinger, among others, have contributed.

Maxence Caron is the author of literary texts and poems and of several works about German thinking (Martin Heidegger, Immanuel Kant, Georg Wilhelm Friedrich Hegel) and about saint Augustine. Pianist, musicologist, Maxence Caron graduated with honours from the Conservatoire National de Paris in 1990.

He has been awarded the Prix Biguet of the Académie française.

== Works ==
- Lire Hegel, Paris, Ellipses, 2000.
- Saint Augustin : La Trinité, Paris, Ellipses, 2004.
- Heidegger – Pensée de l'être et origine de la subjectivité, préface de Jean-François Marquet, Paris, Éditions du Cerf, « La Nuit surveillée », 2005.
- Introduction à Heidegger, Paris, Ellipses, 2005.
- (director), Heidegger, avec les contributions de Jocelyn Benoist, Jean-Luc Marion, Rémi Brague (et al.), Paris, Éditions du Cerf, « Les Cahiers d'Histoire de la Philosophie », 2006.
- Être et identité – Méditation sur la Logique de Hegel et sur son essence, préface de Bernard Mabille, Paris, Éditions du Cerf, « Passages », 2006.
- (director), Hegel avec les contributions de Bernard Bourgeois, Marcel Conche (et al.), Paris, Éditions du Cerf, « Les Cahiers d'Histoire de la Philosophie », 2007.
- Microcéphalopolis – Roman, Paris, Via Romana, 2009.
- (director), Saint Augustin, avec les contributions de Benoît XVI / Joseph Ratzinger, Jean-Louis Chrétien (et al.), Paris, Éditions du Cerf, « Les Cahiers d'Histoires de la Philosophie », 2009.
- La Vérité captive – De la philosophie, Paris, Editions du Cerf / Ad Solem, 2009.
- Pages – Le Sens, la musique et les mots, Paris, Séguier, 2009.
- La pensée catholique de Jean-Sébastien Bach – La Messe en si mineur, Paris, Via Romana, 2010.
- Le Chant du Veilleur – Poëme Symphonique, Préface de Renaud Escande, Paris, Via Romana, 2010.
- Philippe Muray, la femme et Dieu, Artège, 2011.
- (codirector), Philippe Muray, avec les contributions de Jean Clair, Benoit Duteurtre, Fabrice Luchini, (et al.), Paris, Editions du Cerf, "Les Cahiers d'histoire de la philosophie", 2011.
- L'Insolent, NiL / Robert Laffont, 2012.
- Journal inexorable, Via Romana, 2012.
- Improvisation sur Heidegger, Le Cerf, 2012.
- Bréviaire de l'Agnostique, préface d'Alfred Eibel, Editions Pierre-Guillaume de Roux, 2013.
- Verbe et vie de saint Augustin, in Saint Augustin, Sermons sur l'Ecriture, collection "Bouquins", Robert Laffont, 2014.
- Le Contrepoint de Hegel : Prélude et Fugue, Vrin, 2014.
- La Satire Foutre, Les Belles Lettres, 2014

== See also ==
- Martin Heidegger
- Editions du Cerf
