= Henri Caron (cyclist) =

French cyclist

Personal information
- Born: 17 July 1906

Cycling career
- Sport: Cycling
- Discipline: Road
- Role: Rider

Henri Caron (born 17 July 1906, date of death unknown) was a French racing cyclist. He rode in the 1927 Tour de France.
