= Chaeron of Megalopolis =

Chaeron of Megalopolis was the man who, shortly before the birth of Alexander, 356 BC, was sent by Philip to consult the Delphic oracle about the snake which he had seen with Olympias in her chamber and the peculiar dream he had had in which supposedly "a thunderbolt fell into her womb [and]..much fire sprung up". (Plutarch. Alex. 2,3.)

He may be the same person as the Chaeron who, in the speech attributed by some to Demosthenes, is mentioned as having been made tyrant of Pellene by Alexander (comp. Fabric. Bibl. Grace, b. ii. ch. 26), whom Athenaeus (xi. p. 509) describes as having been a pupil both of Plato and Xenocrates. He is said to have conducted himself very tyrannically at Pellene, banishing the chief men of the state, and giving their property and wives to their slaves. Athenaeus speaks of his cruelty and oppression as the natural effect of Plato's principles in the "Republic" and the Laws.
