= Marcel Caron =

Belgian painter

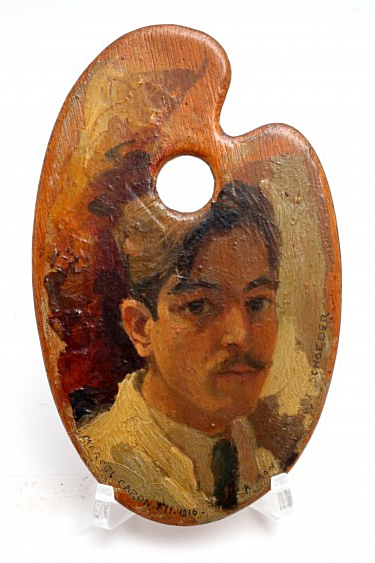
- Born: 13 May 1890; Enghien
- Died: 1961 (aged 70–71); Liège

Marcel Caron (1890–1961) was a Belgian painter born in Enghien.

== Biography ==
His father, Alphonse Caron, also a painter, worked at the Gobelins Manufactory, in 1901, as his family returns to Liège and through the connections of his father, meets Auguste Donnay and Richard Heintz. After close ties with the Barbizon school, he discovers Flemish Expressionism and is influenced by Gustave De Smet, Constant Permeke, Frits van den Berghe whose works are exposed at the art gallery Sélection he visits with Auguste Mambour. In 1926 he founds the group called l'Escalier with Mambour and Edgar Scauflaire. In 1930, at the end of his expressionist period, he sculpts on wood and stone and draws. In 1953 he exhibits abstract gouaches in the Gallery Le Carré in Liège, he continues his abstract research until his death in Liège in 1961 at the age of 71.

== His works ==
Marcel Caron paints scenes of everyday life, Maternité, Son Enfant, Les Fiancés, in the Wallonian Art Museum, L'escarpolette, Le Jeune Garçon but also professions in Le Batelier, Les Bûcherons, La Bouture, L'Homme à la Faux, Les Plaisirs des Jours.

== Exhibits ==
- 1970-1971, Marcel Caron retrospective at the Museum of the Fine Arts of Liège.
- 1990, Abstract Marcel Caron, Cyan Gallery, Liège.
- 1992, Marcel Caron fusains et sanguines, Cyan Gallery, Liège.
