= Joel M. Charon =

American professor and sociologist (1939–2018)

Joel M. Charon (November 24, 1939 – September 7, 2018) was a professor emeritus of sociology at Minnesota State University at Moorhead. He was the author of a number of academic articles and books.

He received his Ph.D. from University of Minnesota.

== Works ==
- Ten Questions: A Sociological Perspective (1994 4th ed.-2013 8th ed.)
- The Meaning of Sociology: A Reader (1987 2nd ed.-2008 9th ed.)
- (with John J. Macionis) Sociology & Meaning (1993)
- Sociology: A Conceptual Approach (1986)
- (with Lee Garth Vigilant) Social Problems: Readings with Four Questions (2011)
- Symbolic Interactionism: An Introduction, An Interpretation, An Integration (2009)
- (with Lee Garth Vigilant) The Meaning of Sociology: A Reader (2008)
