= Auguste Mambour =

Belgian painter

Auguste Mambour (1896–1968) was a Belgian painter.
