= Marye Walsh Caron =

American politician and New Hampshire state senator

Marye Walsh Caron (March 2, 1900 – June 23, 1991) was an American politician who was a member of the New Hampshire Senate and the New Hampshire Liquor Commission. She was the first woman Democrat elected to the New Hampshire Senate and the first woman to serve on the New Hampshire Liquor Commission.

Caron was a member of the New Hampshire House of Representatives from 1939 to 1944. She was elected to the New Hampshire Senate in 1944, but lost her bid for reelection by 60 votes. She won another term in 1948 and served in seven more sessions (1949–1961). She also served as the 1956 Democratic Presidential Elector for New Hampshire. In 1961, she was elected Senate minority leader.

In 1961, Caron was appointed to the New Hampshire Liquor Commission by Republican Governor Wesley Powell. Her nomination was opposed by the chairman of the state Democratic party. She was confirmed by the Executive Council of New Hampshire after several months of deadlock. She was not reappointed by Powell's Democratic successor, John W. King, in 1967.
