= Augustin Joseph Caron =

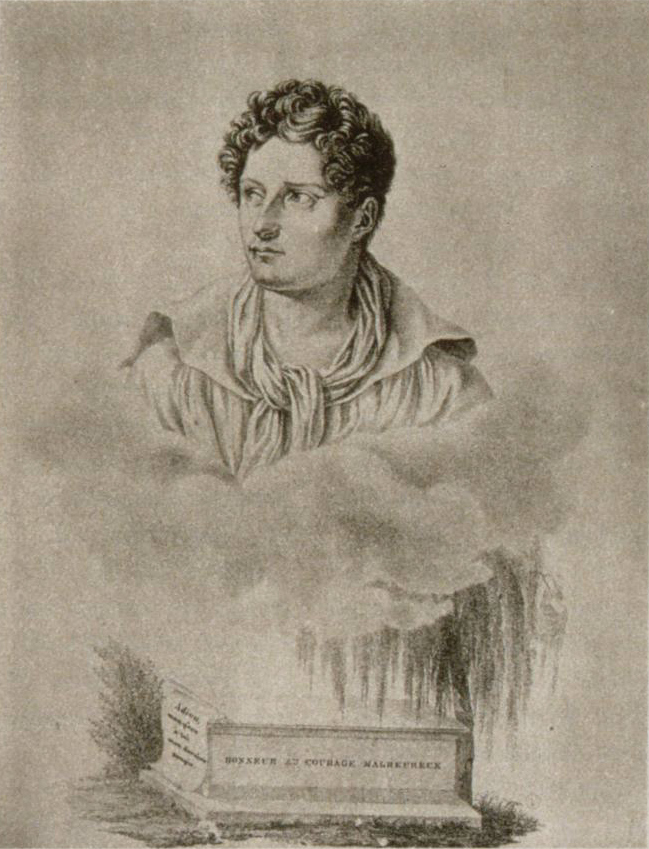
- Born: 28 October 1774 Creuse, France
- Died: 1 October 1822 (aged 47) Strasbourg, France
- Allegiance: France
- Branch: French Army
- Rank: Lieutenant Colonel

Augustin Joseph Caron (1774–1822) was a lieutenant colonel in the French army during the Bourbon Restoration.

He was accused and acquitted of conspiracy in 1820. In 1821 he was again implicated in a conspiracy, this time for attempting to free soldiers involved in the Belfort Conspiracy. To circumvent claims of entrapment, the government brought Caron before a military tribunal. Despite public skepticism, Caron was convicted and executed in 1822.
