= Caron, Western Australia =

Caron
- Town
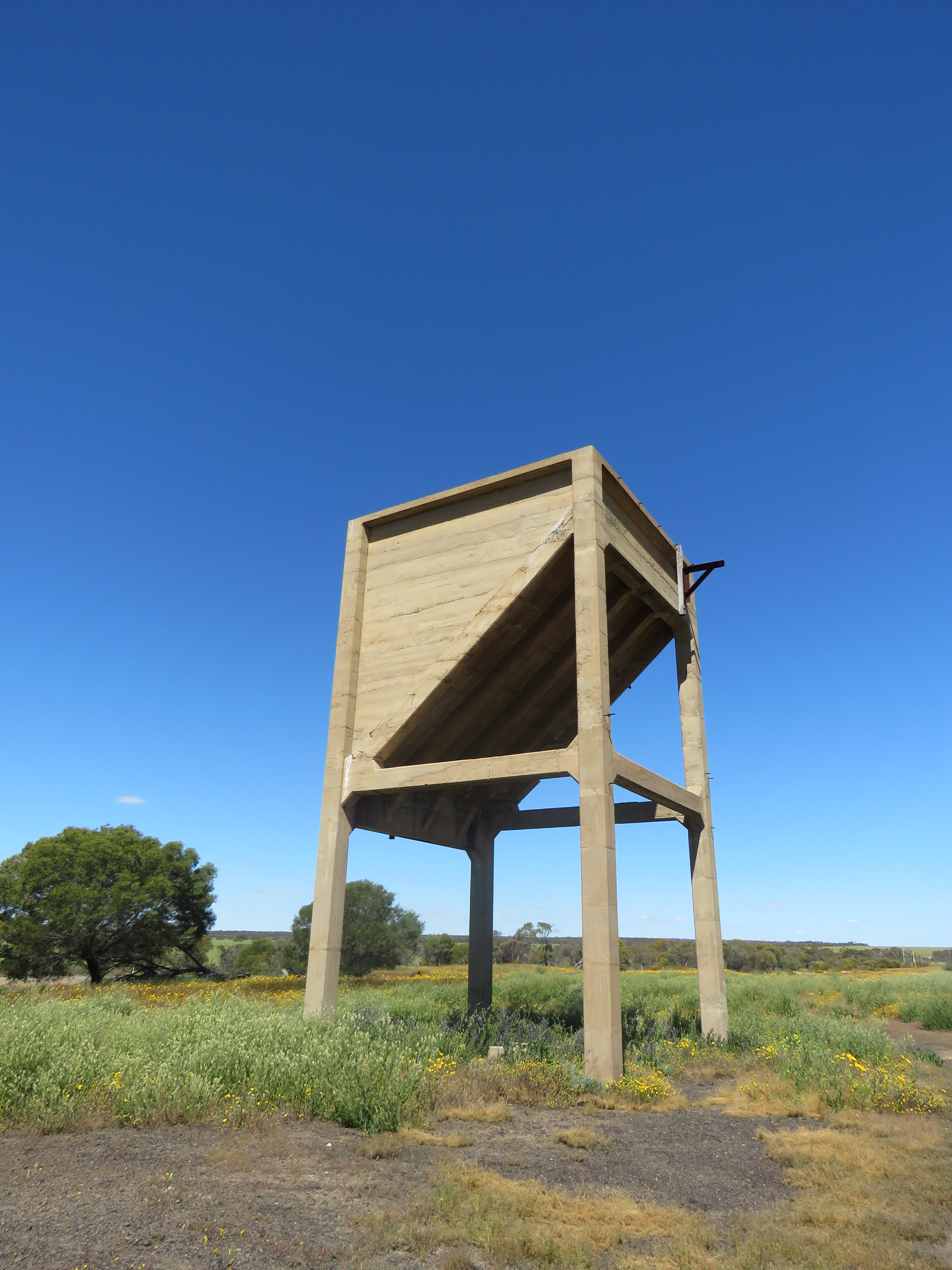
- The state heritage listed Caron Coal Stage, September 2021

- Interactive map of Caron
- Coordinates: 29.633°S 116.317°E
- Country: Australia
- State: Western Australia
- LGA: Shire of Perenjori
- Location: 336 km (209 mi) N of Perth; 12 km (7.5 mi) S of Perenjori
- Established: 1921

Government
  - State electorate: Moore
  - Federal division: Durack
- Elevation: 324 m (1,063 ft)
- Postcode: 6616

Caron is a small town located on the Mullewa-Wubin Road in the Mid West region of Western Australia. It is situated between the towns of Perenjori and Dalwallinu.

The town is named after the nearby Caron Spring which is located about 26 kilometres (16 mi) to the west. Originating as a railway station along the Wongan to Mullewa railway line, the townsite was gazetted in 1921.

The name is Aboriginal in origin, being a word for hail or hailstone.

The heritage-listed Caron Coal Stage, built in the golden age of steam locomotives, and the associated railway dam are located close to the town. The stage is a simple example of an elevated concrete coal bin, constructed in 1930 or 1931 to provide fuel to the trains of the era, and is the only remaining trace of the Caron siding.

The state's steam rail system often had to counteract drought and, in 1948, special trains had to haul in 910,000 litres (200,000 imperial gallons) of water to Caron, Perenjori and Buntine.
