= Michel Caron (Canadian singer) =

Robert Laforest (born September 5, 1942), known professionally as Michel Caron, is a French Canadian musician-keyboardist-singer. In his teenage years, he had singing classes with Lucille Dumont and later voice pitch classes with Eliane Catella.

He record his first disk, with the help of Pierre Nolès, under the label Carol containing the songs “Dis-moi” and “Je t'ai dit” in 1960. Unfortunately, Fleur de Lys company, the owner of Carol, went bankrupt.

At 17 years old, Michel meets Georges Tremblay and together they record a second disk with the record label company London. The disk contains “Tu ris de mes peines” and “Dany”. The third disk, also with London, contains “Auprès de toi” and “Une larme sur ta joue”.

In 1963, he makes the acquaintance of Michèle Richard and she introduced him to Russell Marois, the owner of Météor, a record label company based in Sherbrooke. He is put under contract with Météor to record 5 disks. Many of the recordings ( “Si j’avais un marteau”, “Une larme”, “Un jour”, “Après ton départ” and “Ma Vénus”) make it on the Quebecker songs chart.

In 1966, after the end of his contract with Météor, he signs another contract with Beaumont, a record label company. His first instrumental disk under Beaumont contains the hits “Hava nagila à go go” and “Minuit”. On this disk, Michel plays the organ. Later with his older sister, Claudette Henry, who is a singer-songwriter, he records a second disk containing “Ne t'en va pas” and “La chance me sourit”.

Michel takes part in many television shows at CHLT, a Sherbrooke TV station and also at Jeunesse d’aujourd’hui, a popular live music tv show with the hits of the week. He also performs in many performance halls and piano bars in the province of Quebec.

== Discography ==
- "Dis-moi" B: "Je t'ai dit" - Carol 1960
- "Dany" B: "Tu Ris de Mes Peines" - London 1961
- "Une Larme" B: "Auprès De Toi" - London 1962
- "Après Ton Départ" B: "Ma Vénus" - Météor 1963
- "Je T'aime" B: "Si J'avais Un Marteau" - Météor 1964
- "Ring A Ling" B: "Un Jour" - Météor 1964
- "Y'a Que Moi" - Météor 1965
- "Hava Nagila A Go Go" B: "Minuit" - Beaumont 1966
