= Laurendeau =

Laurendeau is a surname. Notable people with the surname include:

- Adélard Laurendeau, politician Quebec, Canada and a Member of the Legislative Assembly of Quebec
- Aldéric Laurendeau (1890–1961), Quebec politician and physician
- André Laurendeau (1912–1968), journalist, politician, playwright co-chair of the Royal Commission on Bilingualism and Biculturalism in Quebec, Canada
- Louis-Philippe Laurendeau (1861–1916), Canadian composer and bandmaster
- Marcel Laurendeau, politician in Manitoba, Canada
- Martin Laurendeau (born 1964), former touring professional tennis player and present coach

== See also ==
- 78 Laurendeau, bus route in Montreal, Quebec, Canada
- Cégep André-Laurendeau, CEGEP pre-university and technical college in Montreal (LaSalle), Quebec, Canada
- Édifice André-Laurendeau, eleven story office tower in Quebec City, Canada
- Laurendeau-Dunton commission or Royal Commission on Bilingualism and Biculturalism
- Laranda (disambiguation)
- Larinda
- Larunda
