= Théodore Gervais =

Canadian politician

Joseph-Charles-Théodore Gervais (July 25, 1868 – February 18, 1940) was a medical doctor and politician in Quebec.

He was born in Berthier-en-haut, Quebec. He was first elected to the House of Commons of Canada in the 1917 federal election in the riding of Berthier as a Laurier Liberal and was re-elected in 1921. He was subsequently re-elected in the 1925 and 1926 elections from the riding of Berthier—Maskinongé before being elected in the 1930 federal election by Conservative Joseph Arthur Barrette.

Berthier was also mayor of the municipality of Berthierville for four years.

== Electoral record ==
1917 Canadian federal election: Berthier
Party	Candidate	Votes
Opposition (Laurier Liberals)	Théodore Gervais	2,422
Independent Liberal	Arthur Ecrément	1,440

1921 Canadian federal election: Berthier
Party	Candidate	Votes
Liberal	Théodore Gervais	4,910
Conservative	Joseph-Arthur Barrette	2,615
