= Antonio Yanakis =

Canadian politician

Official 1980 portrait

Antonio Yanakis (6 July 1922 – 21 November 1997) was a Liberal party member of the House of Commons of Canada. He was born in Montreal, Quebec and became an industrialist by career after receiving a Bachelor of Commerce at McGill University in Montreal.

He represented the Quebec riding of Berthier—Maskinongé—delanaudière, later Berthier then Berthier—Maskinongé, since winning a seat in the 1965 federal election. Yanakis was re-elected in 1968, 1972, 1974, 1979 and 1980.

Yanakis was defeated in the 1984 federal election by Robert de Cotret of the Progressive Conservative party. He made another unsuccessful bid to unseat de Cotret in the 1988 election as an independent candidate.

Parliament of Canada
Preceded by Rémi Paul	Member of Parliament for Berthier—Maskinongé—delanaudière; 1965–1968	Succeeded by The electoral district was abolished in 1966.
Preceded by The electoral district was created in 1966.	Member of Parliament for Berthier; 1968–1979	Succeeded by The electoral district changed name to Berthier—Maskinongé in 1975.
Preceded by The electoral district changed name from Berthier in 1975.	Member of Parliament for Berthier—Maskinongé; 1979–1984	Succeeded by The electoral district changed name to Berthier—Maskinongé—Lanaudière in 1980.
