= Berthier—Maskinongé—Delanaudière =

Former federal electoral district in Quebec, Canada

Quebec electoral district

Defunct federal electoral district
- Legislature: House of Commons
- District created: 1952
- District abolished: 1966
- First contested: 1953
- Last contested: 1965

Berthier—Maskinongé—Delanaudière (French pronunciation: [bɛʁtje maskinɔ̃ʒe dəlanodjɛʁ]) was a federal electoral district in Quebec, Canada, that was represented in the House of Commons of Canada from 1953 to 1968.

This riding was created in 1952 from Berthier—Maskinongé. It consisted of the county of Berthier and the town of Berthierville, the county of Maskinongé and the town of Louiseville and Gouin township in the county of Joliette.

It was abolished in 1966 when it was redistributed into Berthier and Joliette.

== Members of Parliament ==
This riding elected the following members of Parliament:

Parliament	Years	Member	Party
Berthier—Maskinongé—Delanaudière; Riding created from Berthier—Maskinongé
22nd	1953–1957	Joseph Langlois	Liberal
23rd	1957–1958	Joseph Langlois	Liberal
24th	1958–1962	Rémi Paul	Progressive Conservative
25th	1962–1963	Rémi Paul	Progressive Conservative
26th	1963–1965	Rémi Paul	Progressive Conservative
27th	1965–1968	Antonio Yanakis	Liberal
Riding dissolved into Berthier and Joliette

== Election results ==
1953 Canadian federal election
Party	Candidate	Votes
Liberal	Joseph Langlois	10,709
Independent Nationalist	Adrien Arcand	7,496
Progressive Conservative	Joseph-Elie Langlois	441
Independent	Joseph Langlais	214

1957 Canadian federal election
Party	Candidate	Votes
Liberal	Joseph Langlois	10,418
Progressive Conservative	Rémi Paul	9,049

1958 Canadian federal election
Party	Candidate	Votes
Progressive Conservative	Rémi Paul	12,702
Liberal	Roland Doucet	8,738

1962 Canadian federal election
Party	Candidate	Votes
Progressive Conservative	Rémi Paul	9,211
Liberal	Maurice Savard	7,607
Social Credit	Raoul Vermette	3,452

1963 Canadian federal election
Party	Candidate	Votes
Progressive Conservative	Rémi Paul	8,471
Liberal	Maurice Savard	8,178
Social Credit	René-Paul Gaboury	3,339
New Democratic	Mendoza Bellemare	392

1965 Canadian federal election
Party	Candidate	Votes
Liberal	Antonio Yanakis	7,868
Progressive Conservative	Normand Champagne	5,512
New Democratic	Yvon Saucier	2,672
Ralliement créditiste	Edmond Baril	1,525
Independent Liberal	Lucien Lebrun	315

== See also ==
- List of Canadian electoral districts
- Historical federal electoral districts of Canada
