= Azellus Lavallée =

Canadian politician (1894–1976)

Member of the Legislative Assembly of Quebec for Berthier
- In office 1948–1962
- Preceded by: Armand Sylvestre
- Succeeded by: Lucien McGuire

Personal details
- Born: January 29, 1894 Berthierville, Quebec
- Died: August 30, 1976 (aged 82)
- Spouse: Éva Denis
- Occupation: farmer

Azellus Lavallée (January 29, 1894 – August 30, 1976) was a Canadian politician from Quebec. He represented Berthier in the Legislative Assembly of Quebec from 1948 to 1962 as a member of the Union Nationale.

A farmer, he served as mayor of Sainte-Geneviève-de-Berthier from 1933 to 1937, and ran as an independent candidate in Berthier—Maskinongé in the 1945 Canadian federal election, after having been passed over as a Liberal Party of Canada candidate in favour of Aldéric Laurendeau. A Bloc populaire challenger withdrew from the race to endorse and support Lavallée, although he ultimately lost to Laurendeau.

He won election to the provincial legislature in the 1948 Quebec general election, representing the district until the 1962 Quebec general election, when he was defeated in a re-election bid by Lucien McGuire of the Quebec Liberal Party.

His wife, Éva Denis, was the sister of federal members of parliament Arthur Denis and Azellus Denis.
