= Rémi Paul =

Canadian politician (1921-1982)

Member of the Canadian Parliament for Berthier—Maskinongé—Delanaudière
- In office 1958–1965
- Preceded by: Joseph Langlois
- Succeeded by: Antonio Yanakis

Member of the National Assembly of Quebec for Maskinongé
- In office 1966–1973
- Preceded by: Germain Caron
- Succeeded by: Yvon Picotte

President of the National Assembly of Quebec
- In office 1 December 1966 – 21 October 1968
- Preceded by: Guy Lechasseur
- Succeeded by: Gérard Lebel

Personal details
- Born: 10 June 1921 Louiseville, Quebec
- Died: 20 December 1982 (aged 61) Quebec City, Quebec
- Party: Progressive Conservative

Rémi Paul (French pronunciation: [ʁemi pɔl]; 10 June 1921 – 20 December 1982) was a lawyer and politician from Quebec, Canada.

== Member of the House of Commons ==
Born in Louiseville, Mauricie, Paul ran as a Progressive Conservative candidate in the district of Berthier-Maskinongé-Delanaudière in 1957 and lost, but was elected to the House of Commons of Canada in 1958, 1962 and 1963. He sat as an Independent by 18 February 1965 and did not run for re-election in that same year. Paul was a friend of Quebec fascist leader Adrien Arcand who campaigned for him in the 1957 election.

== Provincial politics ==
Paul ran as a Union Nationale in the district of Maskinongé in 1966 and won a seat at the provincial legislature. He was Speaker of the Legislative Assembly from 1966 to 1968.

He was appointed to the Cabinet and served as Minister of Justice under Premier Jean-Jacques Bertrand.

In 1970, his party lost the election to Robert Bourassa's Liberals. Paul was re-elected and became House Leader of the Official Opposition. However he was defeated against Liberal Yvon Picotte in 1973.
