= Arthur Ecrément =

Canadian politician

Member of the Canadian Parliament for Berthier
- In office 1908–1911
- Preceded by: Joseph Éloi Archambault
- Succeeded by: Joseph Arthur Barrette

Personal details
- Born: June 29, 1879 Saint-Gabriel-de-Brandon, Quebec
- Died: June 23, 1958 (aged 78)
- Party: Liberal

Arthur Ecrément (June 29, 1879 – June 23, 1958) was a Canadian lawyer and politician. Ecrément was a Member of Parliament.

Born in Saint-Gabriel-de-Brandon, Quebec, he was a notary before being elected as a Liberal for the Quebec riding of Berthier in 1908. He was defeated in 1911 and 1917.

== Electoral record ==
1908 Canadian federal election: Berthier
Party	Candidate	Votes
Liberal	Arthur Ecrément	1,887
Conservative	Victor Allard	1,622

1911 Canadian federal election: Berthier
Party	Candidate	Votes
Conservative	Joseph-Arthur Barrette	1,638
Liberal	Arthur Ecrément	1,612
Independent	Jean Joseph Denis	383

1917 Canadian federal election: Berthier
Party	Candidate	Votes
Opposition (Laurier Liberals)	Théodore Gervais	2,422
Independent Liberal	Arthur Ecrément	1,440
