= Guy André =

Canadian politician

Member of Parliament for Berthier—Maskinongé
- In office June 28, 2004 – May 1, 2011
- Preceded by: Riding established
- Succeeded by: Ruth Ellen Brosseau

Personal details
- Born: November 17, 1959 (age 66) Montreal, Quebec, Canada
- Party: Bloc Québécois
- Profession: Coordinator, mediator, political assistant, social worker, teacher

Guy André (born November 17, 1959) is a Canadian politician who was elected to the House of Commons from the riding of Berthier—Maskinongé from 2004 to 2011. He is a member of the Bloc Québécois.

A social worker who lives in Pointe-du-Lac, a former city which is now a borough of Trois-Rivières, André was first elected to Parliament in the 2004 federal election. He was reelected without serious difficulty until he was defeated by NDP challenger Ruth Ellen Brosseau in the unexpected "orange wave" that swept through Quebec in the 2011 federal election. André had never received less than 45 percent of the vote but was held to only 29.4 percent in 2011.

He was considered a member of the "pur et dur" (hardline) faction of the Quebec sovereignty movement.

== Election results ==
2011 Canadian federal election: Berthier—Maskinongé
Party	Candidate	Votes	%	±%	Expenditures
New Democratic	Ruth Ellen Brosseau	22,484	39.63	+29.19	$0
Bloc Québécois	Guy André	16,668	29.38	−16.45	$48,739
Liberal	Francine Gaudet	8,109	14.29	−4.15	$32,253
Conservative	Marie-Claude Godue	7,909	13.94	−8.25	$23,495
Green	Léonie Matteau	1,193	2.10	−1.01	$0
Rhinoceros	Martin Jubinville	375	0.66		$0
Total votes/expense limit		56,738	100.0		$94,930
Source: "Berthier—Maskinongé election results". Elections Canada. May 2, 2011.
