= Cléophas Beausoleil =

Canadian politician (1845–1904)

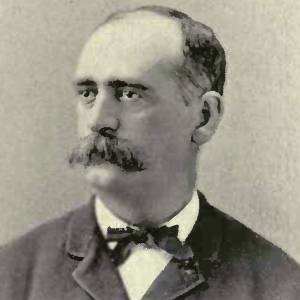

Member of the Canadian Parliament for Berthier
- In office 1887–1899
- Preceded by: Edward Octavian Cuthbert
- Succeeded by: Joseph Éloi Archambault

Personal details
- Born: June 19, 1845 Saint-Félix-de-Valois, Canada East
- Died: October 4, 1904 (aged 59) Saint-Gabriel-de-Brandon, Quebec, Canada
- Party: Liberal
- Spouse: Henriette Lapointe

Cléophas Beausoleil (June 19, 1845 – October 4, 1904) was a Canadian journalist, publisher, office holder, lawyer, and politician.

Born in Saint-Félix-de-Valois, Canada East, he was a journalist and lawyer before entering politics as an alderman with the Montreal City Council in 1882. He was acclaimed in 1885 and resigned in 1888. He was acclaimed again in 1892 and served until he was appointed postmaster in 1899. He was elected to the House of Commons of Canada in the 1887 federal election in the riding of Berthier. A Liberal, he was re-elected in 1891 and acclaimed in 1896. He resigned in 1899, when Canadian prime minister Wilfrid Laurier appointed him postmaster in Montreal.

In 1868, he married Henriette Lapointe. Beausoleil died in Saint-Gabriel-de-Brandon at the age of 59 after an extended illness.

== Electoral record ==
1887 Canadian federal election: Berthier
Party	Candidate	Votes
Liberal	Cléophas Beausoleil	1,535
Conservative	J. B. Robillard	1,304

1891 Canadian federal election: Berthier
Party	Candidate	Votes
Liberal	Cléophas Beausoleil	1,522
Conservative	Victor Allard	1,365

1896 Canadian federal election: Berthier
Party	Candidate	Votes
Liberal	Cléophas Beausoleil	acclaimed
