= Yves Perron =

Canadian politician

Yves Perron MP
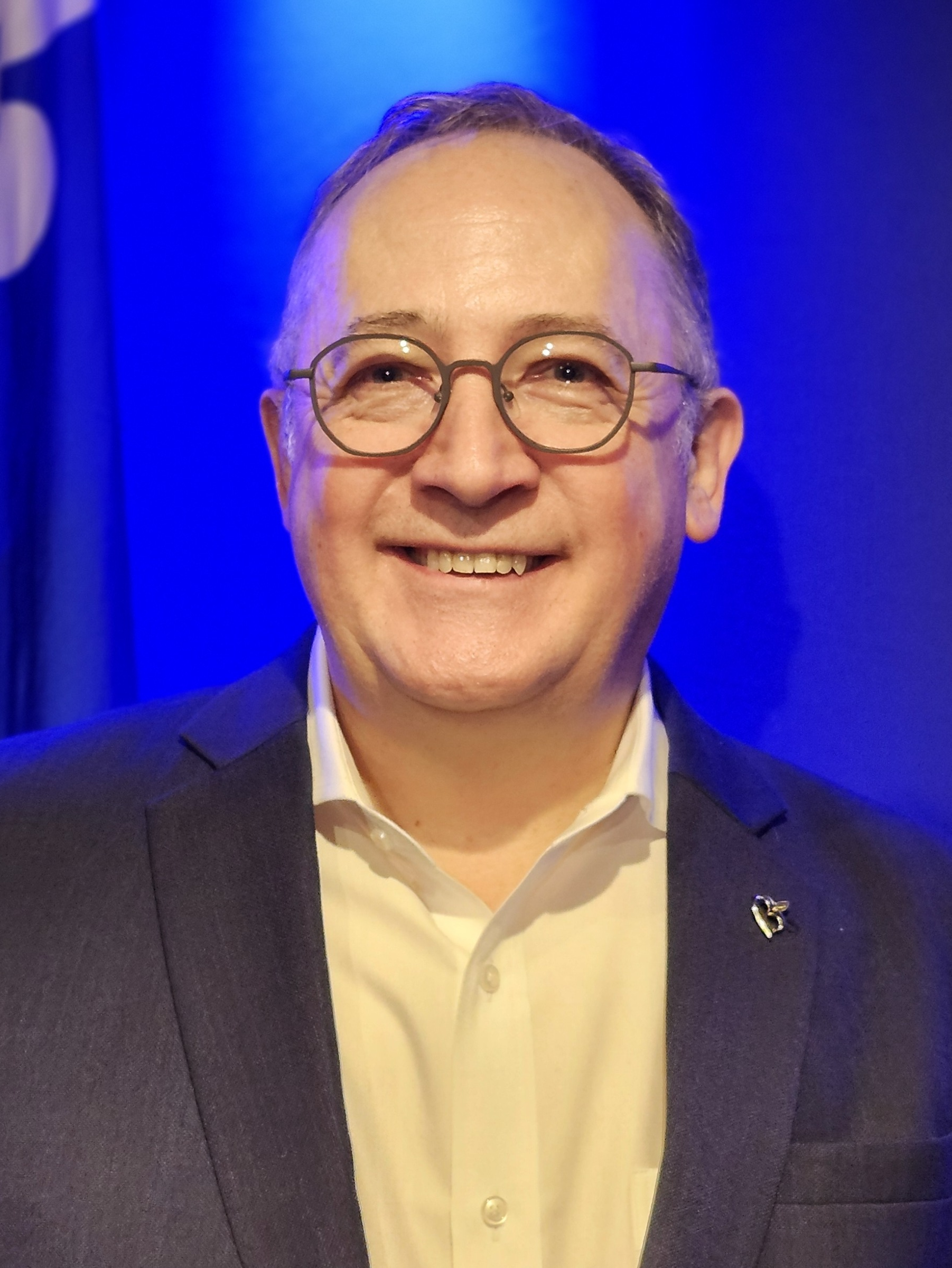
- Perron in 2025

President of the Bloc Québécois
- Incumbent
- Assumed office August 22, 2018
- Leader: Mario Beaulieu (interim); Yves-François Blanchet
- Preceded by: Mario Beaulieu

Member of Parliament for Berthier—Maskinongé
- Incumbent
- Assumed office October 21, 2019
- Preceded by: Ruth Ellen Brosseau

Personal details
- Party: Bloc Québécois

Yves Perron MP (French pronunciation: [iv pɛʁɔ̃]) is a Canadian politician who was elected to the House of Commons in the 2019 federal election, where he represents the riding of Berthier—Maskinongé as a member of the Bloc Québécois (BQ). Perron also serves as president of the party.

== Political career ==
In his first attempt to become Member of Parliament for Berthier—Maskinongé, in 2015, Perron came second to New Democratic Party incumbent Ruth Ellen Brosseau with 25.8% of the vote.

Between 2015 and 2019, he was actively involved in the Quebec independence movement, as regional president of the Parti Québécois for Lanaudière between 2016 and 2018, as well as serving as riding president of the Bloc Québécois in Berthier—Maskinongé.

Following the leadership crisis of Martine Ouellet as head of the Bloc Québécois, he became national president of the Bloc Québécois.

Since 2021 he has served as the critic of agriculture, agri-food and supply management in the Bloc Québécois Shadow Cabinet. He was elected as vice chair of the Canadian House of Commons Standing Committee on Agriculture and Agri-Food in the 45th Canadian Parliament.

At the time of the 2025 Canadian federal election, he lived in Saint-Félix-de-Valois.

== Electoral record ==
2025 Canadian federal election: Berthier—Maskinongé
Party	Candidate	Votes	%	±%
Bloc Québécois	Yves Perron	21,676	34.99	-0.95
Liberal	Stéphane Bilodeau	15,056	24.30	+8.90
New Democratic	Ruth Ellen Brosseau	13,457	21.72	-10.97
Conservative	Peter Saliba	10,641	17.18	+6.26
People's	Elia Gomez-Gnali	575	0.93	-1.71
Green	Daniel Simon	551	0.89	-0.08
Total valid votes/expense limit		61,956	98.44	
Total rejected ballots		981	1.56	-0.26
Turnout		62,937	68.09	+3.22
Eligible voters		92,436		
Bloc Québécois notional hold		Swing		-4.92
Source: Elections Canada
Note: number of eligible voters does not include voting day registrations.

2021 Canadian federal election: Berthier—Maskinongé
Party	Candidate	Votes	%	±%	Expenditures
Bloc Québécois	Yves Perron	19,133	35.22	-2.40	$21,700.43
New Democratic	Ruth Ellen Brosseau	18,200	33.50	-1.45	$106,147.42
Liberal	Alexandre Bellemare	8,264	15.21	+1.38	$5,445.75
Conservative	Léo Soulières	5,963	10.98	+0.67	$5,344.17
People's	Geneviève Sénécal	1,489	2.74	+1.98	$315.35
Green	Laurence Requilé	546	1.01	-0.78	$0.00
Free	Denis Brown	529	0.97		$1,306.74
Marijuana	Steven Lamirande	199	0.37	+0.18	$0.00
Total valid votes/expense limit		54,323	–	–	$115,385.75
Total rejected ballots					
Turnout		54,323	63.08		
Registered voters		86,119			
Source: Elections Canada

2019 Canadian federal election: Berthier—Maskinongé
Party	Candidate	Votes	%	±%	Expenditures
Bloc Québécois	Yves Perron	21,200	37.62	+11.82	none listed
New Democratic	Ruth Ellen Brosseau	19,698	34.95	-7.22	$35,745.36
Liberal	Christine Poirier	7,796	13.83	-6.45	$33,806.20
Conservative	Josée Bélanger	5,812	10.31	+0.11	$13,544.45
Green	Éric Laferrière	1,008	1.79	+0.23	none listed
People's	Luc Massé	428	0.76	–	$3,303.24
Independent	Alain Bélanger	154	0.27	–	none listed
Rhinoceros	Martin Acetaria Caesar Jubinville	151	0.27	–	none listed
Marijuana	Danny Légaré	107	0.19	–	none listed
Total valid votes/expense limit		56,354	100.0		
Total rejected ballots		977	1.16	+0.14	
Turnout		57,331	68.01	+1.87	
Eligible voters		84,301			
Bloc Québécois gain from New Democratic		Swing		+9.52	
Source: Elections Canada

2015 Canadian federal election
Party	Candidate	Votes	%	±%	Expenditures
New Democratic	Ruth Ellen Brosseau	22,942	42.24%	+2.61	$41,378.43
Bloc Québécois	Yves Perron	13,969	25.72%	−3.66	$54,785.38
Liberal	Pierre Destrempes	11,028	20.31%	+6.02	$16,329.10
Conservative	Marianne Foucrault	5,527	10.18%	−3.76	$7,559.45
Green	Victoria Cate May Burton	844	1.55%	−0.55	$0
Total valid votes/Expense limit		–	100.0		$218,838.34
Total rejected ballots		–	–	–	
Turnout		54,310	66.14%	–	
Eligible voters		82,109			
Source: Elections Canada
