= Berthier—Maskinongé =

Federal electoral district in Quebec, Canada

Quebec electoral district
- Interactive map of riding boundaries from the 2025 federal election
- Coordinates: 46.33°N 73.10°W

Federal electoral district
- Legislature: House of Commons
MP
Yves Perron
Bloc Québécois
- District created: 1924
- First contested: 1925
- Last contested: 2021
- District webpage: profile, map

Demographics
- Population (2016): 100,371
- Electors (2019): 84,301
- Area (km²): 4,150.60
- Pop. density (per km²): 24.2
- Census division(s): D'Autray, Maskinongé, Trois-Rivières
- Census subdivision(s): Trois-Rivières (part), Lavaltrie, Louiseville, Saint-Félix-de-Valois, Saint-Boniface, Lanoraie, Saint-Jean-de-Matha, Saint-Étienne-des-Grès, Berthierville, Saint-Sulpice

Berthier—Maskinongé (French pronunciation: [bɛʁtje maskinɔ̃ʒe]; formerly known as Berthier and Berthier—Maskinongé—Lanaudière) is a federal electoral district in Quebec, Canada, that has been represented in the House of Commons of Canada from 1925 to 1953, from 1968 to 1988, and since 2004. Its population in 2001 was 103,516.

== Geography ==
The riding extends along the north bank of the Saint Lawrence River between the north suburbs of Montreal and Trois-Rivières, straddling the Quebec regions of Lanaudière and Mauricie.

The district includes the Regional County Municipalities of D'Autray and Maskinongé, and the former cities of Pointe-du-Lac and Trois-Rivières-Ouest in the City of Trois-Rivières.

The neighbouring ridings are Joliette, Repentigny, Verchères—Les Patriotes, Bas-Richelieu—Nicolet—Bécancour, Trois-Rivières, and Saint-Maurice—Champlain.

== Demographics ==
According to the 2021 Canadian census, 2023 representation order

Race: 96.3% White, 1.8% Indigenous
Languages: 97.6% French, 1.7% English
Religions: 74.9% Christian (68.9% Catholic, 5.9% Other), 24.5% None
Median income: $37,600 (2020)
Average income: $44,520 (2020)

== History ==
The riding was created in 1924 from Berthier and Maskinongé. It consisted of Berthier County and Maskinongé County.

In 1947, it was redefined to consist of the county of Berthier and the town of Berthierville, the county of Maskinongé and the town of Louiseville, and Gouin township in the county of Joliette.

In 1952, it was abolished when it was merged into Berthier—Maskinongé—delanaudière riding.

The riding was recreated in 1966 as "Berthier" from the districts of Berthier—Maskinongé—Delanaudière, Chapleau, Joliette—L'Assomption—Montcalm, St-Maurice—Laflèche, and Three Rivers.

In 1975, the name of the riding was changed to "Berthier-Maskinongé". After the 1980 election, the name of the district was changed to Berthier—Maskinongé—Lanaudière.

In the 1984 election, the seat was won by Progressive Conservative Robert de Cotret, who held it until the 1988 election. The riding was abolished in 1987. It was divided between Berthier—Montcalm, Champlain, and Saint-Maurice.

Berthier—Maskinongé was re-created in 2003. 44.8% of the riding came from Trois-Rivières, 36.0% from Berthier—Montcalm, and 19.2% from Saint-Maurice.

In the 2004 election and the 2006 election, Bloc Québécois MP Guy André was elected in the riding.

This riding lost territory to Trois-Rivières and gained territory from Joliette during the 2012 electoral redistribution.

Following 2022 Canadian federal electoral redistribution, it gained Saint-Sulpice from Repentigny.

=== Members of Parliament ===
This riding has elected the following members of Parliament:

Parliament	Years	Member	Party
Berthier—Maskinongé; Riding created from Berthier and Maskinongé
15th	1925–1926	Joseph-Charles-Théodore Gervais	Liberal
16th	1926–1930	Joseph-Charles-Théodore Gervais	Liberal
17th	1930–1935	Joseph Arthur Barrette	Conservative
18th	1935–1940	J.-Émile Ferron	Liberal
19th	1940–1945	J.-Émile Ferron	Liberal
20th	1945–1949	Aldéric Laurendeau	Liberal
21st	1949–1953	Joseph Langlois	Liberal
Riding dissolved into Berthier—Maskinongé—Delanaudière
Berthier; Riding re-created from Berthier—Maskinongé—Delanaudière, Chapleau, Joliette—L'Assomption—Montcalm, St-Maurice—Laflèche and Three Rivers
28th	1968–1972	Antonio Yanakis	Liberal
29th	1972–1974	Antonio Yanakis	Liberal
30th	1974–1979	Antonio Yanakis	Liberal
Berthier—Maskinongé
31st	1979–1980	Antonio Yanakis	Liberal
32nd	1980–1984	Antonio Yanakis	Liberal
Berthier—Maskinongé—Lanaudière
33rd	1984–1988	Robert de Cotret	Progressive Conservative
Riding dissolved into Berthier—Montcalm, Champlain and Saint-Maurice
Berthier—Maskinongé; Riding re-created from Trois-Rivières, Berthier—Montcalm and Saint-Maurice
38th	2004–2006	Guy André	Bloc Québécois
39th	2006–2008	Guy André	Bloc Québécois
40th	2008–2011	Guy André	Bloc Québécois
41st	2011–2015	Ruth Ellen Brosseau	New Democratic
42nd	2015–2019	Ruth Ellen Brosseau	New Democratic
43rd	2019–2021	Yves Perron	Bloc Québécois
44th	2021–2025	Yves Perron	Bloc Québécois
45th	2025–present	Yves Perron	Bloc Québécois

== Election results ==
=== Berthier—Maskinongé, 2004–present ===
Graph of election results in Berthier—Maskinongé (since 2004, minor parties that never got 2% of the vote or didn't run consistently are omitted) View source data.

2025 Canadian federal election
Party	Candidate	Votes	%	±%
Bloc Québécois	Yves Perron	21,676	34.99	-0.95
Liberal	Stéphane Bilodeau	15,056	24.30	+8.90
New Democratic	Ruth Ellen Brosseau	13,457	21.72	-10.97
Conservative	Peter Saliba	10,641	17.18	+6.26
People's	Elia Gomez-Gnali	575	0.93	-1.71
Green	Daniel Simon	551	0.89	-0.08
Total valid votes/expense limit		61,956	98.44	
Total rejected ballots		981	1.56	-0.26
Turnout		62,937	68.09	+3.22
Eligible voters		92,436		
Bloc Québécois notional hold		Swing		-4.92
Source: Elections Canada
Note: number of eligible voters does not include voting day registrations.

2021 federal election redistributed results
Party	Vote	%
Bloc Québécois	20,392	35.93
New Democratic	18,550	32.69
Liberal	8,740	15.40
Conservative	6,195	10.92
People's	1,496	2.64
Free	608	1.07
Green	548	0.97
Marijuana	199	0.35
Indépendance du Québec	19	0.03
Total valid votes	56,747	98.18
Rejected ballots	1,052	1.82
Registered voters/ estimated turnout	89,098	64.87

2021 Canadian federal election
Party	Candidate	Votes	%	±%	Expenditures
Bloc Québécois	Yves Perron	19,133	35.22	-2.40	$21,700.43
New Democratic	Ruth Ellen Brosseau	18,200	33.50	-1.45	$106,147.42
Liberal	Alexandre Bellemare	8,264	15.21	+1.38	$5,445.75
Conservative	Léo Soulières	5,963	10.98	+0.67	$5,344.17
People's	Geneviève Sénécal	1,489	2.74	+1.98	$315.35
Green	Laurence Requilé	546	1.01	-0.78	$0.00
Free	Denis Brown	529	0.97		$1,306.74
Marijuana	Steven Lamirande	199	0.37	+0.18	$0.00
Total valid votes/expense limit		54,323	–	–	$115,385.75
Total rejected ballots					
Turnout		54,323	63.08		
Registered voters		86,119			
Source: Elections Canada

2019 Canadian federal election
Party	Candidate	Votes	%	±%	Expenditures
Bloc Québécois	Yves Perron	21,200	37.62	+11.82	none listed
New Democratic	Ruth Ellen Brosseau	19,698	34.95	-7.22	$35,745.36
Liberal	Christine Poirier	7,796	13.83	-6.45	$33,806.20
Conservative	Josée Bélanger	5,812	10.31	+0.11	$13,544.45
Green	Éric Laferrière	1,008	1.79	+0.23	none listed
People's	Luc Massé	428	0.76	–	$3,303.24
Independent	Alain Bélanger	154	0.27	–	none listed
Rhinoceros	Martin Acetaria Caesar Jubinville	151	0.27	–	none listed
Marijuana	Danny Légaré	107	0.19	–	none listed
Total valid votes/expense limit		56,354	100.0		
Total rejected ballots		977	1.16	+0.14	
Turnout		57,331	68.01	+1.87	
Eligible voters		84,301			
Bloc Québécois gain from New Democratic		Swing		+9.52	
Source: Elections Canada

2015 Canadian federal election
Party	Candidate	Votes	%	±%	Expenditures
New Democratic	Ruth Ellen Brosseau	22,942	42.17	+0.93	$37,968.71
Bloc Québécois	Yves Perron	14,037	25.80	-5.21	$30,493.57
Liberal	Pierre Destrempes	11,032	20.28	+8.21	$6,302.22
Conservative	Marianne Foucrault	5,548	10.20	-2.52	$6,268.53
Green	Victoria Cate May Burton	847	1.56	-0.78	–
Total valid votes/Expense limit		54,406	100.0		$219,786.82
Total rejected ballots		844	1.02	–	
Turnout		55,250	66.14%	–	
Eligible voters		82,803			
Source: Elections Canada

2011 federal election redistributed results
Party	Vote	%
New Democratic	20,193	41.24
Bloc Québécois	15,183	31.01
Conservative	6,228	12.72
Liberal	5,912	12.07
Green	1,145	2.34
Rhinoceros	304	0.62

2011 Canadian federal election
Party	Candidate	Votes	%	±%	Expenditures
New Democratic	Ruth Ellen Brosseau	22,484	39.63	+29.19	$0
Bloc Québécois	Guy André	16,668	29.38	−16.45	$48,739
Liberal	Francine Gaudet	8,109	14.29	−4.15	$32,253
Conservative	Marie-Claude Godue	7,909	13.94	−8.25	$23,495
Green	Léonie Matteau	1,193	2.10	−1.01	$0
Rhinoceros	Martin Jubinville	375	0.66		$0
Total votes/expense limit		56,738	100.0		$94,930
Source: "Berthier—Maskinongé election results". Elections Canada. May 2, 2011.

2008 Canadian federal election
Party	Candidate	Votes	%	±%	Expenditures
Bloc Québécois	Guy André	24,945	45.83	-3.7	$51,026
Conservative	Marie-Claude Godue	12,078	22.19	-8.9	$84,917
Liberal	Jean-Luc Matteau	10,035	18.44	+8.0	$27,551
New Democratic	André Chauvette	5,684	10.44	+4.1	$1,358
Green	Denis Lefebvre	1,691	3.11	-0.5	$109
Total valid votes/Expense limit		54,433	100.00	$90,701	
Total rejected ballots		994	1.8		
Turnout		55,427	–		

2006 Canadian federal election
Party	Candidate	Votes	%	±%	Expenditures
Bloc Québécois	Guy André	25,032	48.5	-11.4	$36,769
Conservative	Marie-Claude Godue	16,039	31.1	+19.8	$22,363
Liberal	Serge Lafrénière	5,386	10.4	-12.3	$24,384
New Democratic	Anne-Marie Aubert	3,274	6.3	+3.0	$5
Green	Nathalie Gratton	1,839	3.6	+0.9	
Total valid votes/Expense limit		51,570	100.0	$83,453	

2004 Canadian federal election
Party	Candidate	Votes	%	±%	Expenditures
Bloc Québécois	Guy André	29,432	59.9	–	$47,895
Liberal	Laurier Thibault	11,198	22.8	–	$35,533
Conservative	Ann Julie Fortier	5,535	11.3	–	$13,200
New Democratic	Denis McKinnon	1,653	3.4	–	$2,990
Green	Eric Labrecque	1,314	2.7	–	$0
Total valid votes/Expense limit		49,132	100.0	$81,153	

=== Berthier—Maskinongé, 1975-1988 ===
1984 Canadian federal election
Party	Candidate	Votes	%	±%
Progressive Conservative	Robert De Cotret	31,189	69.6	+26.2
Liberal	Antonio Yanakis	11,736	26.2	-26.5
New Democratic	Jean Philip Penner	1,200	2.7	
Parti nationaliste	Marcel Rocheleau	608	1.4	
Commonwealth of Canada	Germain Rouzioux	68	0.2	
Total valid votes		44,801	100.0	

1980 Canadian federal election
Party	Candidate	Votes	%	±%
Liberal	Antonio Yanakis	21,232	52.7	-4.7
Progressive Conservative	Robert De Cotret	17,483	43.4	+11.7
Rhinoceros	Ti-Pit Claude Des Gagne	728	1.8	
Social Credit	Camille Schmidt	546	1.4	-6.2
Marxist–Leninist	Ginette Cardinal	146	0.4	-0.3
Union populaire	France Guimond	132	0.3	-0.1
Total valid votes		40,267	100.0	

1979 Canadian federal election
Party	Candidate	Votes	%
Liberal	Antonio Yanakis	21,725	57.4
Progressive Conservative	Fernand Giroux	11,995	31.7
Social Credit	Camille Schmidt	2,851	7.5
New Democratic	Richard Leclercq	841	2.2
Marxist–Leninist	Ginette Cardinal	235	0.6
Union populaire	Réjean Maille	179	0.5
Total valid votes		37,826	100.0

=== Berthier—Maskinongé, 1925–1953 ===
1949 Canadian federal election
Party	Candidate	Votes	%	±%
Liberal	Joseph Langlois	11,770	58.8	-0.7
Progressive Conservative	René Beland	8,242	41.2	+38.0
Total valid votes		20,012	100.0	

1945 Canadian federal election
Party	Candidate	Votes	%	±%
Liberal	Aldéric Laurendeau	10,604	59.6	-15.7
Independent	Azellus Lavallée	6,639	37.3	
Progressive Conservative	Joseph-Edouard Hamelin	562	3.2	-21.6
Total valid votes		17,805	100.0	

Note: Progressive Conservative vote is compared to "National Government" vote in 1940 election.

1940 Canadian federal election
Party	Candidate	Votes	%	±%
Liberal	J-Emile Ferron	10,119	75.3	+20.6
National Government	Joseph Arthur Barrette	3,323	24.7	-7.8
Total valid votes		13,442	100.0	

Note: "National Government" vote is compared to Conservative vote in 1935 election.

1935 Canadian federal election
Party	Candidate	Votes	%	±%
Liberal	J-Emile Ferron	8,459	54.7	+6.0
Conservative	Joseph Arthur Barrette	5,022	32.5	-18.8
Reconstruction	Joseph Desjarlais	1,978	12.8	
Total valid votes		15,459	100.0	

1930 Canadian federal election
Party	Candidate	Votes	%	±%
Conservative	Joseph Arthur Barrette	7,206	51.3	+10.1
Liberal	Jean-Charles Théodore Gervais	6,850	48.7	-10.1
Total valid votes		14,056	100.0	

1926 Canadian federal election
Party	Candidate	Votes	%	±%
Liberal	Joseph-Charles-Théodore Gervais	6,606	58.8	-2.2
Conservative	Joseph Arthur Barrette	4,626	41.2	+2.2
Total valid votes		11,232	100.0	

1925 Canadian federal election
Party	Candidate	Votes	%
Liberal	Joseph-Charles-Théodore Gervais	6,664	61.0
Conservative	Joseph Arthur Barrette	4,264	39.0
Total valid votes		10,928	100.0

== See also ==
- List of Canadian electoral districts
- Historical federal electoral districts of Canada
