= Armand Sylvestre (MLA) =

Canadian judge and politician (1910–1980)

Member of the Legislative Assembly of Quebec for Berthier
- In office 1944–1948
- Preceded by: Cléophas Bastien
- Succeeded by: Azellus Lavallée

Personal details
- Born: October 16, 1910 Saint-Cuthbert, Quebec
- Died: November 4, 1980 (aged 70) Saint-Thomas, Quebec
- Party: Liberal

Armand Sylvestre (October 16, 1910 – November 4, 1980) was a lawyer, judge and political figure in Quebec. He represented Berthier in the Legislative Assembly of Quebec from 1944 to 1948 as a Liberal.

Born in Saint-Cuthbert, Quebec, the son of Camille Sylvestre and Marie-Louise Paquette, Sylvestre was educated in Saint-Cuthbert, at the Séminaire de Joliette, the Collège de Berthierville and the Université de Montréal. He was called to the Quebec bar in 1937 and set up practice in Berthierville. Sylvestre was solicitor for the Liquor Commission in Joliette district from 1939 to 1944 and managing director of the Courrier de Berthier from 1945 to 1948. In 1941, he married Mariette Daviault. He was elected in the 1944 Quebec general election, but was defeated when he ran for reelection in 1948, and again in 1952. Sylvestre was judge in the Court of Sessions of the Peace at Montreal from 1962 to 1972. He died at Saint-Thomas at the age of 70.
