= Joseph-Éloi Archambault =

Canadian politician

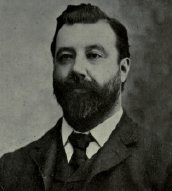

Member of the Canadian Parliament for Berthier
- In office 1900–1908
- Preceded by: Cléophas Beausoleil
- Succeeded by: Arthur Ecrément

Personal details
- Born: December 3, 1861 St-Jacques-L'Achigan, Canada East
- Died: December 23, 1916 (aged 55)
- Party: Liberal

Joseph-Éloi Archambault (French pronunciation: [ʒozɛf elwa aʁʃɑ̃bo]; December 3, 1861 – December 23, 1916) was a Canadian politician.

Born in St-Jacques-L'Achigan, Montcalm County, Canada East, the son of Francois Archambault and Ogine Magnan, Archambault was educated at L'Assomption College and Laval University. A notary, was Mayor of Saint-Gabriel-de-Brandon, Quebec from 1895 to 1907 and Warden of the County of Berthier from 1895 to 1900. He became a member of the House of Commons of Canada for the electoral district of Berthier at a January 18, 1900 by-election by acclamation. A Liberal, he was re-elected at the general elections of 1900 and 1904.

== Electoral record ==
By-election on 18 January 1900 Berthier (federal electoral district)
Party	Candidate	Votes
Liberal	Joseph-Éloi Archambault	acclaimed

1900 Canadian federal election: Berthier
Party	Candidate	Votes
Liberal	Joseph-Éloi Archambault	1,529
Conservative	F. O. Lamarche	1,235

1904 Canadian federal election: Berthier
Party	Candidate	Votes
Liberal	Joseph-Éloi Archambault	1,707
Conservative	T. Michaud	1,498
