= Ruth Ellen Brosseau =

Canadian politician (born 1984)

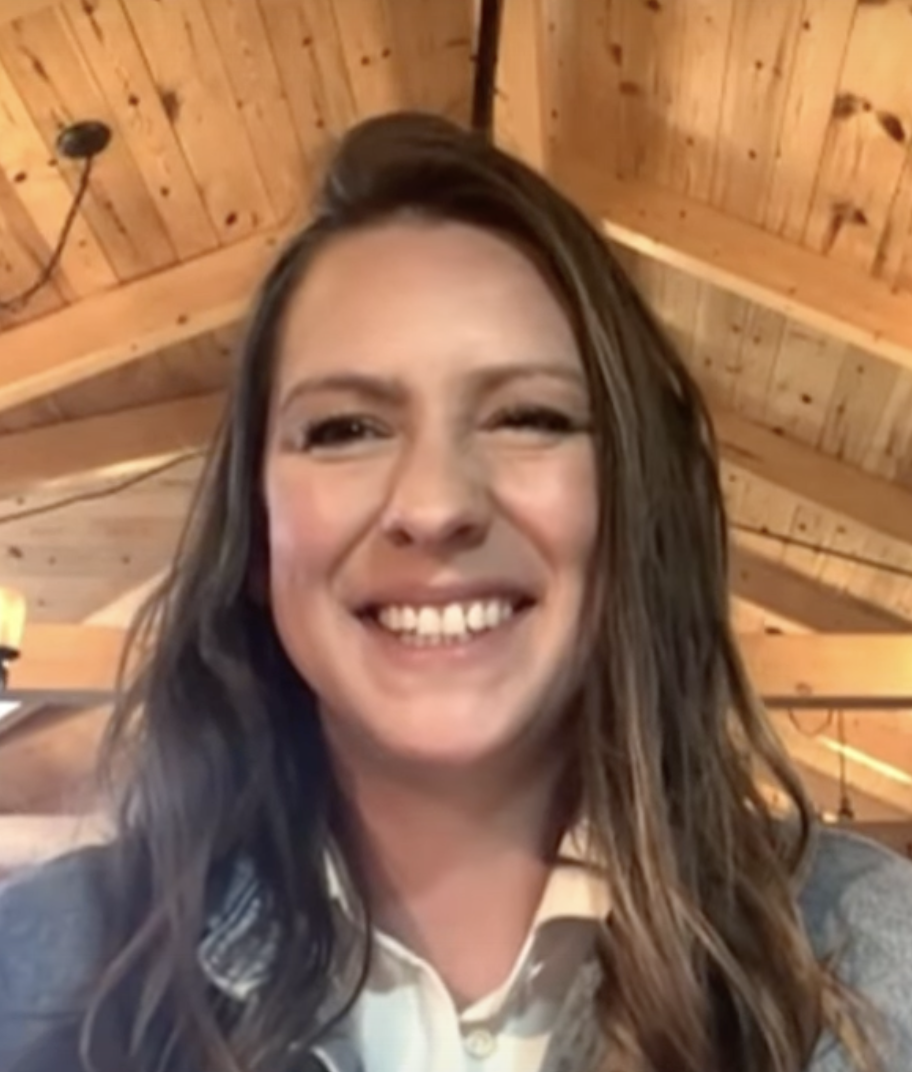
- Brosseau in 2025

House Leader of the New Democratic Party
- In office January 31, 2018 – March 14, 2019
- Leader: Jagmeet Singh
- Preceded by: Peter Julian
- Succeeded by: Peter Julian

Whip of the New Democratic Party
- In office March 14, 2019 – October 20, 2019
- Leader: Jagmeet Singh
- Preceded by: Marjolaine Boutin-Sweet
- Succeeded by: Rachel Blaney

Member of Parliament for Berthier—Maskinongé
- In office May 2, 2011 – October 21, 2019
- Preceded by: Guy André
- Succeeded by: Yves Perron

Personal details
- Born: April 26, 1984 (age 42) Ottawa, Ontario, Canada
- Party: New Democratic
- Profession: Farmer, pub manager

Ruth Ellen Brosseau (born April 26, 1984) is a Canadian politician who represented the riding of Berthier—Maskinongé in the House of Commons from the 2011 federal election until her defeat in 2019. She is a member of the New Democratic Party (NDP).

In Brosseau's first election campaign, she gained national attention for her surprising rise from a "paper candidate" to a viable contestant; she also gained the nickname "Vegas Girl" for a mid-election campaign vacation to Las Vegas. She won reelection in the 2015 federal election with a larger vote share despite her party falling from second to third place nationally. Her parliamentary roles included House Leader of the NDP, critic for Agriculture and Agri-Food and deputy NDP caucus chair.

== Early and personal life ==
Brosseau was born in Ottawa, and lived in Hudson, Quebec, before her family moved to Kingston, Ontario. Brosseau's father, Marc, is a francophone, who is also fluent in English. Brosseau was educated in French both in Quebec and in Ontario. She attended St. Lawrence College in Kingston, but left prior to completing her diploma.

Before her election to Parliament, Brosseau was an assistant manager for Oliver's Pub, a bar on the campus of Carleton University in Ottawa. She also worked as a bartender at Pier 21 in the ByWard Market near Parliament and the University of Ottawa. She is also an animal welfare activist who has worked to find homes for stray animals and help injured animals recover.

Brosseau was a single mother. She gave birth when she was 17 and finished high school partly through the use of correspondence courses. Her son does not have any contact with his biological father. As a young mother Brosseau cleaned hotel rooms and was fired after she tried to organize the employees.

During her tenure as MP, Brosseau divided her time between her riding and Hull, Quebec, in the National Capital Region. By 2019, Brosseau was in a relationship with a local pork farmer in Yamachiche, Quebec. After her defeat in the 2019 Canadian federal election, Brosseau stated that she planned to remain in the area. She married her partner and began working on the farm and the attached charcuterie shop starting in January 2020.

== Political career ==
=== 2011 election ===
Brosseau first ran for a seat in the House of Commons of Canada in the 2011 federal election, as the New Democratic Party candidate in the electoral district of Berthier—Maskinongé in central Quebec. She was the second nomination choice of the party as the original candidate, Julie Demers, chose to run in Bourassa. Brosseau was a paper candidate who had been selected by the party due to the lack of a viable local nominee. She agreed to run after being asked by politically active friends who frequented the bar where she worked.

The vegetarian Brosseau knew nothing about politics or the riding, with many pork and beef farmers, and a travel time of three-and-one-half hours away from her Ottawa home by car. She did not expect to win, did not campaign, and never went to the riding, which straddles Lanaudière and Mauricie. During the election, Brosseau went on vacation to Las Vegas for her birthday. Her trip had been arranged prior to the election being called; by the time the writ was dropped, it was too late to reschedule or get a refund. The media mocked her as a "Vegas girl", but NDP leader Jack Layton defended Brosseau's decision to vacation, pinning the blame on Stephen Harper not keeping his promise on fixed election dates. An op-ed in the National Post criticized Brosseau's inexperience, writing that she is "an extreme example of what happens when people sign up to run for a party with little or no expectation of actually winning".

On election night, Brosseau defeated incumbent Bloc Québécois Member of Parliament Guy André, former provincial Liberal MNA Francine Gaudet and three other candidates, winning a plurality with 22,484 votes, representing just under 40% of all the votes cast. This represented a lead of 5,816 votes over André, who finished a distant second with only 29.4 percent of the vote. Her victory was part of a wave of NDP support in Quebec that increased its standing in the province from one seat to 59.

There was some concern about Brosseau's proficiency in French given her riding's demographics. At the time, 98% of Berthier-Maskinongé's residents were francophone, and 77 percent of them did not speak English. She was unable to conduct an interview in French when elected. At a press conference held the day after Brosseau's election, Tom Mulcair, then the NDP co-deputy leader and Quebec lieutenant, addressed her language issues. While conceding that Brosseau's command of French was "not at a level we would expect for a riding like Berthier—Maskinongé", he personally promised to "help organize her office" and "give her all the help that's needed."

Two days after the election, allegations were made by both the defeated Liberal and Conservative candidates about irregularities on Brosseau's nomination papers, which the other parties had chosen not to vet because of low expectations of her winning. The local Liberal and Conservative associations called for a by-election, but Elections Canada found Brosseau's nomination papers to be in order and subsequently ruled that only a court can order new elections. Both parties subsequently declined to file a formal court challenge. In response to the allegations, the NDP released a statement, stating that "All signatures were collected legitimately, the documents were tabled with Elections Canada and they were approved by the Returning Officer."

=== 41st Parliament ===
Immediately following her election, Brosseau began working with Kathleen Monk, the NDP's director of communication in 2011, to tackle some of the challenges she faced as a new MP. She avoided the media and met with mayors and local business owners in her riding to get a grasp of her new constituents. When discussing her political career, Monk said, "There were many people in the media and political backrooms who didn’t think or frankly wanted her to succeed."

When Brosseau officially opened her constituency office in Louiseville in July 2011 her French was described as "still hesitant". Le Nouvelliste described her as speaking "increasingly fluid French" in December. Brosseau stated that her constituency offices functioned "100% in French" and that she continued to take lessons three times a week. By April 2012 the Canadian Press stated that "original claims about her lack of proficiency in the language now appear exaggerated". It reported that the rumours about Brosseau's lack of proficiency in French benefited her, as many constituents believed that she was a monolingual anglophone when elected and were amazed by her apparently rapidly improving French. Brosseau said that she grew up speaking French as a child, and understood the language, but did not feel comfortable speaking it during the campaign because she had been out of practice. By 2015 Chatelaine described Brosseau as being fluently bilingual, and TVA Nouvelles said that she spoke "a French almost without an accent".

On April 19, 2012, the new NDP leader, Tom Mulcair, named Brosseau to be deputy agriculture critic in the NDP's shadow cabinet. On April 3, 2014, she was elected as vice-chair of the NDP National Caucus.

Brosseau earned praise from her caucus colleagues and the national media, with Malcolm Allen remarking that "lots of MPs work hard, but she has a great work ethic". As a single mother, she often raised issues faced by those in a similar position during parliamentary debates. Chatelaine said in 2015 that, despite early criticism, "the 31-year-old has quietly evolved into an effective and highly regarded politician". In 2013, Brosseau became the NDP's lead on the student loan data breach, in part because she was personally impacted by the incident.

Brosseau championed local causes important to her riding such as high repair costs to fix defective home foundations built with pyrrhotite mixed in with concrete, an issue that she brought up 70 times in the 41st Parliament. Although she never managed to get the Harper government to join the provincial government in providing compensation, she and fellow NDP MP Robert Aubin were credited with influencing Justin Trudeau's promise that a Liberal government would do so.

=== 2015 election and 42nd Parliament ===
In 2014, Brosseau announced that she would be a candidate in the 2015 federal election. Speaking with Mark Kennedy of the Ottawa Citizen, Brosseau spoke about the difficulties she faced during her first years as an MP, but noted, "It took a while to kind of get my feet planted, set up an office, learn what the job was. The negativity only encouraged me to work harder". While the NDP's Quebec caucus was reduced to 16 seats during the election, Brosseau was one of the few NDP MPs elected in 2011 who not only kept their seats, but also increased their vote share, winning re-election with 42% of the vote (almost 3% more than her first election) and almost 10,000 votes over her nearest opponent. The New York Times attributed Brosseau's reelection to her focus on the pyrrhotite issue.

Brosseau was appointed the NDP critic for Agriculture and Agri-food in the 42nd Canadian Parliament.

In May 2016, an incident in the House of Commons arose where Prime Minister Justin Trudeau accidentally hit Brosseau in the chest. The situation arose after Trudeau was attempting to lead Conservative Whip Gord Brown to his seat so a scheduled vote could take place. Leading up to the incident dubbed "Elbowgate", the Opposition parties had accused the government trying to ram Bill C-14 through the House and Senate, using various strategies like assigning a time limit to debate and giving enormous powers to ministers. Brosseau rose in the House on a point of personal privilege and placed a description of the incident into the Hansard by describing the incident on the record, and Trudeau apologized more than once, indicating his lack of intention to hurt anyone. The following day, Brosseau said she had become a target of personal attacks, saying that her office received a number of phone calls from members of the public criticising her over the incident. Senior figures and colleagues from both the Liberal and Conservative parties subsequently came to her defence. It was referred to in the House of Commons as "the matter of the physical molestation of the Member from Berthier—Maskinongé".

In January 2018, newly elected NDP leader Jagmeet Singh named her as the NDP House leader. She was succeeded in March 2019 by Peter Julian, her predecessor in the prior year.

=== 2019 election ===
In the October 21, 2019 general election, the NDP lost all their remaining seats in Quebec except Rosemont—La Petite-Patrie, represented by party regional lieutenant Alexandre Boulerice. Brosseau lost to Bloc Québécois candidate Yves Perron, who had previously challenged her in 2015. In 2019, he won 21,007 votes (37.4%) to her 19,500 (34.7%).

=== 2021 election ===
On August 27, 2021, Brosseau announced that she was running for the 2021 federal election. She came in a close second in a rematch with Perron, losing by just under 1,000 votes.

=== 2025 election ===
On April 6, 2025, Brosseau announced that she was running for the 2025 Canadian federal election. She was once again defeated by Perron.

== Depictions in popular culture ==
La Candidate, a television series inspired in part by Brosseau's experience, was announced as going into production in 2022 with Catherine Chabot in the lead role.

== Electoral record ==
2025 Canadian federal election: Berthier—Maskinongé
Party	Candidate	Votes	%	±%	Expenditures
Bloc Québécois	Yves Perron	21,676	34.99	–0.95	$42,844.58
Liberal	Stéphane Bilodeau	15,056	24.30	+8.90	$14,713.28
New Democratic	Ruth Ellen Brosseau	13,457	21.72	–10.97	$66,825.60
Conservative	Peter Saliba	10,641	17.18	+6.26	$3,579.49
People's	Elia Gomez-Gnali	575	0.93	–1.71	$595.29
Green	Daniel Simon	551	0.89	–0.08	$0.00
Total valid votes/expense limit		61,956	98.44	–	$138,298.18
Total rejected ballots		981	1.56	–0.26	
Turnout		62,937	68.09	+3.22	
Eligible voters		92,436			
Bloc Québécois notional hold		Swing		–4.92	
Source: Elections Canada
Note: number of eligible voters does not include voting day registrations.

2021 Canadian federal election: Berthier—Maskinongé
Party	Candidate	Votes	%	±%	Expenditures
Bloc Québécois	Yves Perron	19,133	35.22	-2.40	$21,700.43
New Democratic	Ruth Ellen Brosseau	18,200	33.50	-1.45	$106,147.42
Liberal	Alexandre Bellemare	8,264	15.21	+1.38	$5,445.75
Conservative	Léo Soulières	5,963	10.98	+0.67	$5,344.17
People's	Geneviève Sénécal	1,489	2.74	+1.98	$315.35
Green	Laurence Requilé	546	1.01	-0.78	$0.00
Free	Denis Brown	529	0.97		$1,306.74
Marijuana	Steven Lamirande	199	0.37	+0.18	$0.00
Total valid votes/expense limit		54,323	–	–	$115,385.75
Total rejected ballots					
Turnout		54,323	63.08		
Registered voters		86,119			
Source: Elections Canada

2019 Canadian federal election: Berthier—Maskinongé
Party	Candidate	Votes	%	±%	Expenditures
Bloc Québécois	Yves Perron	21,200	37.62	+11.82	none listed
New Democratic	Ruth Ellen Brosseau	19,698	34.95	-7.22	$35,745.36
Liberal	Christine Poirier	7,796	13.83	-6.45	$33,806.20
Conservative	Josée Bélanger	5,812	10.31	+0.11	$13,544.45
Green	Éric Laferrière	1,008	1.79	+0.23	none listed
People's	Luc Massé	428	0.76	–	$3,303.24
Independent	Alain Bélanger	154	0.27	–	none listed
Rhinoceros	Martin Acetaria Caesar Jubinville	151	0.27	–	none listed
Marijuana	Danny Légaré	107	0.19	–	none listed
Total valid votes/expense limit		56,354	100.0		
Total rejected ballots		977	1.16	+0.14	
Turnout		57,331	68.01	+1.87	
Eligible voters		84,301			
Bloc Québécois gain from New Democratic		Swing		+9.52	
Source: Elections Canada

2015 Canadian federal election
Party	Candidate	Votes	%	±%	Expenditures
New Democratic	Ruth Ellen Brosseau	22,942	42.24%	+2.61	$41,378.43
Bloc Québécois	Yves Perron	13,969	25.72%	−3.66	$54,785.38
Liberal	Pierre Destrempes	11,028	20.31%	+6.02	$16,329.10
Conservative	Marianne Foucrault	5,527	10.18%	−3.76	$7,559.45
Green	Victoria Cate May Burton	844	1.55%	−0.55	$0
Total valid votes/Expense limit		–	100.0		$218,838.34
Total rejected ballots		–	–	–	
Turnout		54,310	66.14%	–	
Eligible voters		82,109			
Source: Elections Canada

2011 Canadian federal election: Berthier—Maskinongé
Party	Candidate	Votes	%	±%	Expenditures
New Democratic	Ruth Ellen Brosseau	22,484	39.63	+29.19	$0
Bloc Québécois	Guy André	16,668	29.38	−16.45	$48,739
Liberal	Francine Gaudet	8,109	14.29	−4.15	$32,253
Conservative	Marie-Claude Godue	7,909	13.94	−8.25	$23,495
Green	Léonie Matteau	1,193	2.10	−1.01	$0
Rhinoceros	Martin Jubinville	375	0.66		$0
Total votes/expense limit		56,738	100.0		$94,930
Source: "Berthier—Maskinongé election results". Elections Canada. May 2, 2011.
