= Elbowgate =

2016 Canadian political scandal

Justin Trudeau as he grabs the arm of Conservative whip Gord Brown

Elbowgate was an incident in which Canadian prime minister Justin Trudeau came into physical contact with two opposition members of Parliament in the House of Commons on May 18, 2016 during the parliamentary session. During the incident Trudeau grabbed Conservative MP Gord Brown by the arm and then inadvertently elbowed New Democratic MP Ruth Ellen Brosseau in the chest. Trudeau subsequently apologized and was not subject to parliamentary sanctions for the incident.

== Background ==
The event took place as opposition MPs sought to delay a closure motion on the final reading of Bill C-14, a bill to amend the Criminal Code to allow physician-assisted death.

Numerous MPs, including Green Party leader Elizabeth May, have suggested that Trudeau's actions may be explained by the time-sensitive nature of this bill, which had to be passed before the Supreme Court, invalidated certain sections of the Criminal Code that could have put voluntary euthanasia and physician-assisted death in a legislative grey area. Opposition parties "accused the government of trying to ram it through the House and Senate using various strategies such as assigning a time limit to debate". NDP MP Charlie Angus stated that there was a toxic atmosphere in the House as "[The Liberals] were introducing motions that would give enormous power to the ministers. That was basically putting a nuclear weapon on the table. They could call a debate at two in the morning with a vote at three. It became a very torturous, toxic place. That's not how the Westminster system works. As opposition, you have very few tools. Sometimes you have a slow vote—it's a tactic. The Speaker hadn't made any move that there was a problem. The vote had been delayed all of 30 seconds or a minute."

== Incident ==
As the Conservative's chief opposition whip Gord Brown was moving down the opposition side of the aisle toward his seat, NDP leader Tom Mulcair and two NDP MPs (Ruth Ellen Brosseau and David Christopherson) attempted to block Brown in an effort to delay the vote. Canadian parliamentary custom has it that before a vote begins the Government and Official Opposition whips walk into the House together after the bell has rung, walk up the aisle on their own sides, then sit down after bowing toward the Speaker and each other.

The chief government whip, Liberal MP Andrew Leslie, and government house leader, Liberal MP Dominic LeBlanc, had walked down their side of the aisle. However, Brown was unable to move past the three NDP MPs. In an interview with CBC News, Green Party leader Elizabeth May affirmed that the NDP members were deliberately seeking to disrupt proceedings in their unwillingness to clear the aisle. Watching the situation, prime minister Justin Trudeau crossed the floor of the House, took hold of Brown's arm to steer him through the group, and allegedly shouted to the other MPs "Get the fuck out of my way". In the confusion, Trudeau elbowed Brosseau in the chest.

Immediately following the incident, Brosseau told the House she felt overwhelmed and went to sit in the lobby. Brosseau missed the vote as a result. The incident prompted a shouting match between Trudeau and Mulcair, in which Mulcair yelled to Trudeau "What kind of man elbows a woman? You're pathetic." Brown said in a statement to media that he told Trudeau, "let go of me – now", and recommended that Trudeau should not have gotten out of his seat to confront the other Opposition MPs.

== Responses ==
The Elbowgate incident provoked multiple responses from various members of Parliament:

- Interim Conservative Party leader, Rona Ambrose, tweeted that Trudeau's actions "are worthy of the strongest condemnation of this House".
- Conservative MP Peter Van Loan suggested following the proceedings of a "Physical Molestation" matter.
- NDP MP Pierre Nantel was quoted as seeing the incident with "such determination that it was clear he was furious and determined to make it physical".
- NDP MP Niki Ashton believed that the matter should be considered assault. She said, "[I]f we apply a gendered lens, it is very important that young women in this space feel safe to come here and work here ... He made us feel unsafe and we're deeply troubled by the conduct of the prime minister of this country."
- Conservative MP Lisa Raitt made an indirect reference to Jian Ghomeshi, who was on trial for sexual harassment.
- Conservative MP Peter Kent suggested that Trudeau's actions were in contempt of Parliament.
- NDP MP Peter Julian compared the incident to the violent outbreaks in other countries.
- Conservative MP Michael Cooper said that he considered the actions criminal assault.
- Conservative MP Jason Kenney called it "physical bullying of MPs. Bizarre, unforgivable, unprecedented", and "If Stephen Harper [Trudeau's predecessor as prime minister] had ever physically bullied MPs like Justin Trudeau, there would be immediate & widespread demands for his resignation."

Political commentators and satirists also commented on the incident:

- Comedian John Oliver, in a Last Week Tonight segment, commented that Trudeau should not have done what he did, but also compared the contact to that one might expect shopping at a Trader Joe's in New York City. Acknowledging Trudeau's multiple apologies immediately following the incident, he joked that Trudeau would be expected to "spend the remainder of his term ... apologizing for the existence of his arm".
- Progressive political commentator Cenk Uygur said that Trudeau had "bumped into" Brosseau. He was also critical of Brosseau for claiming she was so overwhelmed she needed to leave the chamber and miss the vote.
- Montreal Gazette copy editor Steve Faguy joked "Trudeau clearing people away was the only solution to this problem", highlighting the large empty space Brown could have used to return to his seat and marked it "Dragons?"
- Retired NHL hockey referee Kerry Fraser broke down the incident into hockey penalties: interference; elbowing; diving; unsportsmanlike conduct, a game misconduct, and a ten-game suspension; unsportsmanlike conduct and a five-game suspension, as well as typical hockey phrases like chirping, bench clearing, and going to the dressing room for repairs.

== Aftermath ==
The following day, MPs spent five hours discussing the altercation, which was officially referred to in the House of Commons as "Physical molestation of the Member from Berthier—Maskinongé." Trudeau apologized to the House several times for his actions. Brosseau said the public later accused her, in telephone calls to her office, of "crying wolf". The all-party Committee on Procedure and House Affairs decided on May 31, 2016, that Trudeau would face no scrutiny or parliamentary sanctions for the incident, a decision that paralleled public opinion on the matter; according to polls taken the week after the incident, the majority of Canadians indicated that they saw the incident as "no big deal" or a "momentary lapse of judgement".

Trudeau made apologies for the incident three times over the following two days. Brosseau formally accepted Trudeau's apology and stated she hoped MPs would "work to ensure that we never see this conduct repeated". An all-party committee also accepted Trudeau's apology and determined there would be no parliamentary sanctions nor further calls for apologies.

Liberal house leader Dominic Leblanc subsequently withdrew Motion 6, which would have given the Liberal government "new powers to control the business of the House for the next five weeks", and which had been condemned by the opposition parties before and after the "Elbowgate" incident.

== See also ==
- List of scandals with "-gate" suffix
