= J.-Émile Ferron =

Canadian politician

J.-Émile Ferron (25 September 1896 – 2 March 1970) was a lawyer and federal Quebec politician.

He was born in Saint-Léon in the region of Maskinongé, Quebec where he practiced law until being elected from the riding of Berthier-Maskinongé to the House of Commons of Canada as a Liberal in the 1935 federal election. He was re-elected in 1940 but defeated in 1945.
