= Edward Octavian Cuthbert =

Canadian politician

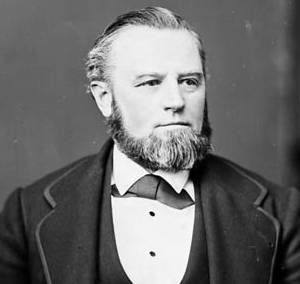

Member of the Canadian Parliament for Berthier
- In office 1875–1887
- Preceded by: Anselme-Homère Pâquet
- Succeeded by: Cléophas Beausoleil

Personal details
- Born: December 3, 1826 Berthier, Lower Canada
- Died: July 28, 1890 (aged 63)
- Party: Conservative

Edward Octavian Cuthbert (December 3, 1826 – July 28, 1890) was a Quebec politician of independent means. He represented Berthier in the House of Commons of Canada as a Conservative member from 1875 to 1887.

He was born in Berthier, Lower Canada in 1826, the son of James Cuthbert and Mary-Louise Amable Cairns, and was educated at Chambly College. He served as mayor of Berthier from 1868 to 1873 and from 1877 to 1878. Cuthbert was also president of the County Agricultural Society. He ran unsuccessfully for a seat in the Quebec assembly in 1867. He was elected to the House of Commons in an 1875 by-election held after the sitting member was named to the Senate.

In 1853, Cuthbert married Mary Bostwick. In 1849, he had inherited the seigneury of Berthier of which he was the last seigneur.

== Electoral record ==
By-election on 27 February 1875
Party	Candidate	Votes
Conservative	Edward Octavian Cuthbert	1,056
Unknown	Isaie Stanislas Norbert Drainville	784

1878 Canadian federal election: Berthier
Party	Candidate	Votes
Conservative	Edward Cuthbert	1,134
Unknown	P. Beliveau	915
Source: Canadian Elections Database

1882 Canadian federal election: Berthier
Party	Candidate	Votes
Conservative	Edward Octavian Cuthbert	1,138
Unknown	Louis Sylvestre	1,120
