= Anselme-Homère Pâquet =

Canadian politician (1830–1891)

The Hon. Anselme-Homère Pâquet
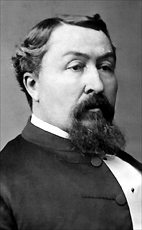

Member of the Legislative Assembly of the Province of Canada for Berthier
- In office 1863–1866
- Preceded by: Pierre-Eustache Dostaler
- Succeeded by: Institution abolished

Member of the Canadian Parliament for Berthier
- In office 1867–1875
- Succeeded by: Edward Octavian Cuthbert

Senator for De la Vallière, Quebec
- In office 1875–1891
- Appointed by: Alexander Mackenzie
- Preceded by: Charles-Christophe Malhiot
- Succeeded by: Auguste-Réal Angers

Personal details
- Born: 29 September 1830 Saint-Cuthbert, Lower Canada
- Died: 22 December 1891 (aged 61) Saint-Cuthbert, Quebec
- Party: Liberal

Anselme-Homère Pâquet (29 September 1830 – 22 December 1891) was a Canadian physician, professor and parliamentarian. He served three terms as a Liberal Member of Parliament in the House of Commons of Canada representing the Quebec riding of Berthier.

He was born Michel-Anselme Pâquet in Saint-Cuthbert, Lower Canada in 1830. He studied at the Montreal School of Medicine and Surgery, qualified as a physician in 1853 and opened a practice in Saint-Cuthbert. By 1854, he had adopted the name Anselme-Homère. He was elected to the Legislative Assembly of the Province of Canada in 1863 for Berthier and served until Confederation. He opposed confederation. He was elected in the Canadian federal election of 1867, and was re-elected in 1872 and 1874. He resigned his seat in the House of Commons to accept an appointment to the Senate of Canada on 9 February 1875 on the recommendation of Alexander Mackenzie. He served in this capacity, representing the senatorial division of De la Vallière, Quebec, until his death in 1891. Pâquet also taught clinical medicine at the Hôtel-Dieu de Montréal and hygiene and public health at the Montreal School of Medicine.

1867 Canadian federal election: Berthier
Party	Candidate	Votes
Liberal	Anselme-Homère Pâquet	1,131
Unknown	L. Trachemontagne	1,095
Eligible voters		3,040
Source: Canadian Parliamentary Guide, 1871

1872 Canadian federal election: Berthier
Party	Candidate	Votes
Liberal	Anselme-Homère Pâquet	757
Conservative	Edward Octavian Cuthbert	15
Unknown	Barthe	0
Source: Canadian Elections Database

1874 Canadian federal election: Berthier
Party	Candidate	Votes
Liberal	Anselme-Homère Pâquet	acclaimed
Source: Canadian Elections Database
