= Laranda =

Laranda may refer to:

- Laranda (Lycaonia), also spelled Larende, an ancient city and former bishopric of Lycaonia, today Karaman in south-central Turkey and a Latin Catholic titular see
- Laranda (Cilicia), a town of ancient Cilicia
- Laranda, a town of ancient Cataonia, possibly the same as Leandis
- An alternate spelling of Larunda (also known as Larunde or Lara), a nymph in Ancient Roman myth
- Laranda (insect), a genus of Phalangopsidae cricket
