= Joseph-Arthur Barrette =

Canadian politician (1875–1952)

Member of the Canadian Parliament for Berthier
- In office 1911–1921
- Preceded by: Arthur Ecrément
- Succeeded by: Théodore Gervais

Member of the Canadian Parliament for Berthier—Maskinongé
- In office 1930–1935
- Preceded by: Joseph Arthur Barrette
- Succeeded by: Joseph Arthur Barrette

Personal details
- Born: April 28, 1875 Saint-Barthélemy, Quebec, Canada
- Died: April 27, 1952 (aged 76)
- Party: Conservative
- Occupation: businessman, farmer, notary

Joseph-Arthur Barrette (April 28, 1875 – April 27, 1952) was a Canadian politician, businessman, farmer and notary.

Born in Saint-Barthélemy, Quebec, Canada, Barrette was elected to the House of Commons of Canada as a Member of the historical Conservative Party in 1911 to represent the riding of Berthier. He ran for election again in 1930 for the riding of Berthier—Maskinongé and won. He previously lost in 1921, 1925 and 1926. He also lost the elections of 1935 and 1940.

1911 Canadian federal election: Berthier
Party	Candidate	Votes
Conservative	Joseph-Arthur Barrette	1,638
Liberal	Arthur Ecrément	1,612
Independent	Jean Joseph Denis	383
