= Joseph Langlois =

Canadian politician (1909–1964)

Member of Parliament for Berthier—Maskinongé
- In office June 1949 – August 1953

Member of Parliament for Berthier—Maskinongé—delanaudière
- In office August 1953 – February 1958

Personal details
- Born: 15 April 1909 Varennes, Quebec, Canada
- Died: 19 November 1964 (aged 55) Saint-Didace, Quebec, Canada
- Party: Liberal
- Profession: notary

Joseph Langlois (French pronunciation: [ʒozɛf lɑ̃ɡlwa]; 15 April 1909 – 19 November 1964) was a Liberal party member of the House of Commons of Canada. Born in Varennes, Quebec, he was a notary by career.

He was first elected at the Berthier—Maskinongé riding in the 1949 general election then re-elected for successive terms at Berthier—Maskinongé—delanaudière in 1953 and 1957. After completing his final federal term, the 23rd Canadian Parliament, Langlois did not seek re-election in the 1958 election.
