= Leandis =

Town in ancient Cataonia, Cappadocia

Leandis (Ancient Greek: Λεανδίς) was a town in the eastern part of ancient Cataonia 18 miles to the south of Cocusus, in a pass of Mount Taurus, on the road to Anazarbus. This town is perhaps the same as the Laranda of the Antonine Itinerary and of the Synecdemus, which must not be confounded with the Laranda of Lycaonia.

Its site is unlocated.
