= Berthier (federal electoral district) =

Former federal electoral district in Quebec, Canada

Quebec electoral district

Defunct federal electoral district
- Legislature: House of Commons
- District created: 1867
- District abolished: 1924
- First contested: 1867
- Last contested: 1921

Berthier (French pronunciation: [bɛʁtje]) was a federal electoral district in the Canadian province of Quebec that was represented in the House of Commons of Canada from 1867 to 1925.

It was created by the British North America Act, 1867, and was abolished in 1924 when it was merged into Berthier—Maskinongé riding.

A second "Berthier" riding was created in 1966. This riding was renamed Berthier—Maskinongé in 1975. Please see the article on that riding for the history of Berthier during this period.

== Members of Parliament ==
This riding elected the following members of Parliament:

| Parliament | Years | Member | Party |
|---|---|---|---|
Berthier
| 1st | 1867–1872 | Anselme-Homère Pâquet | Liberal |
| 2nd | 1872–1874 | Anselme-Homère Pâquet | Liberal |
| 3rd | 1874–1875 | Anselme-Homère Pâquet | Liberal |
| 3rd | 1875–1878 | Edward Octavian Cuthbert | Conservative |
| 4th | 1878–1882 | Edward Octavian Cuthbert | Conservative |
| 5th | 1882–1887 | Edward Octavian Cuthbert | Conservative |
| 6th | 1887–1891 | Cléophas Beausoleil | Liberal |
| 7th | 1891–1896 | Cléophas Beausoleil | Liberal |
| 8th | 1896–1899 | Cléophas Beausoleil | Liberal |
| 8th | 1900–1900 | Joseph-Éloi Archambault | Liberal |
| 9th | 1900–1904 | Joseph-Éloi Archambault | Liberal |
| 10th | 1904–1908 | Joseph-Éloi Archambault | Liberal |
| 11th | 1908–1911 | Arthur Ecrément | Liberal |
| 12th | 1911–1917 | Joseph-Arthur Barrette | Conservative |
| 13th | 1917–1921 | Théodore Gervais | Opposition (Laurier Liberals) |
| 14th | 1921–1925 | Théodore Gervais | Liberal |
Riding dissolved into Berthier—Maskinongé

== Election results ==
1867 Canadian federal election
| Party | Candidate | Votes |
|---|---|---|
| Liberal | Anselme-Homère Pâquet | 1,131 |
| Unknown | L. Trachemontagne | 1,095 |
| Eligible voters | | 3,040 |
Source: Canadian Parliamentary Guide, 1871

1872 Canadian federal election
| Party | Candidate | Votes |
|---|---|---|
| Liberal | Anselme-Homère Pâquet | 757 |
| Conservative | Cuthbert | 15 |
| Unknown | Barthe | 0 |
Source: Canadian Elections Database

1874 Canadian federal election
| Party | Candidate | Votes |
|---|---|---|
| Liberal | Anselme-Homère Pâquet | acclaimed |
Source: Canadian Elections Database

By-election: On Mr. Paquet being called to the Senate

By-election on 27 February 1875
| Party | Candidate | Votes |
| Conservative | Edward Octavian Cuthbert | 1,056 |
| Unknown | Isaie Stanislas Norbert Drainville | 784 |

1878 Canadian federal election
| Party | Candidate | Votes |
|---|---|---|
| Conservative | Edward Cuthbert | 1,134 |
| Unknown | P. Beliveau | 915 |
Source: Canadian Elections Database

1882 Canadian federal election
| Party | Candidate | Votes |
|---|---|---|
| Conservative | Edward Octavian Cuthbert | 1,138 |
| Unknown | Louis Sylvestre | 1,120 |

1887 Canadian federal election
| Party | Candidate | Votes |
|---|---|---|
| Liberal | Cléophas Beausoleil | 1,535 |
| Conservative | J. B. Robillard | 1,304 |

1891 Canadian federal election
| Party | Candidate | Votes |
|---|---|---|
| Liberal | Cléophas Beausoleil | 1,522 |
| Conservative | Victor Allard | 1,365 |

1896 Canadian federal election
| Party | Candidate | Votes |
|---|---|---|
| Liberal | Cléophas Beausoleil | acclaimed |

By-election: Mr. C. Beausoleil appointed Postmaster of Montreal 1 December 1899.

By-election on 18 January 1900 Berthier (federal electoral district)
| Party | Candidate | Votes |
| Liberal | Joseph-Éloi Archambault | acclaimed |

1900 Canadian federal election
| Party | Candidate | Votes |
|---|---|---|
| Liberal | Joseph-Éloi Archambault | 1,529 |
| Conservative | F. O. Lamarche | 1,235 |

1904 Canadian federal election
| Party | Candidate | Votes |
|---|---|---|
| Liberal | Joseph-Éloi Archambault | 1,707 |
| Conservative | T. Michaud | 1,498 |

1908 Canadian federal election
| Party | Candidate | Votes |
|---|---|---|
| Liberal | Arthur Ecrément | 1,887 |
| Conservative | Victor Allard | 1,622 |

1911 Canadian federal election
| Party | Candidate | Votes |
|---|---|---|
| Conservative | Joseph-Arthur Barrette | 1,638 |
| Liberal | Arthur Ecrément | 1,612 |
| Independent | Jean Joseph Denis | 383 |

1917 Canadian federal election
| Party | Candidate | Votes |
|---|---|---|
| Opposition (Laurier Liberals) | Théodore Gervais | 2,422 |
| Independent Liberal | Arthur Ecrément | 1,440 |

1921 Canadian federal election
| Party | Candidate | Votes |
|---|---|---|
| Liberal | Théodore Gervais | 4,910 |
| Conservative | Joseph-Arthur Barrette | 2,615 |

== See also ==
- List of Canadian electoral districts
- Historical federal electoral districts of Canada
