= Aldéric Laurendeau =

Canadian politician

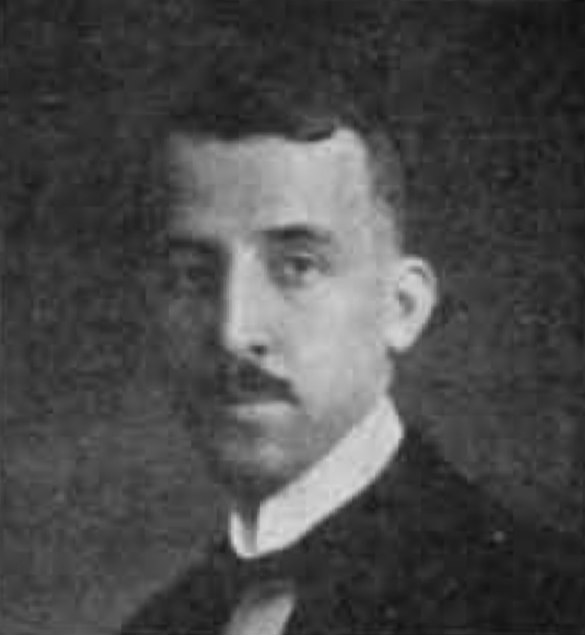
Laurendeau c. 1923

Aldéric Laurendeau (September 25, 1890 – January 11, 1961) was a Quebec politician and physician.

He was born in Saint-Gabriel-de-Brandon in the Lanaudière region of Quebec and worked as a doctor. He was a Liberal candidate in the 1945 federal election and was elected in the riding of Berthier-Maskinongé but did not run in the 1949 federal election.

Laurendeau was mayor of Saint-Gabriel-de-Brandon for eight years.

His cousin was novelist and Bloc populaire canadien politician André Laurendeau.
